= HMS Royal Sovereign (1891) =

Royal Sovereign-class battleship

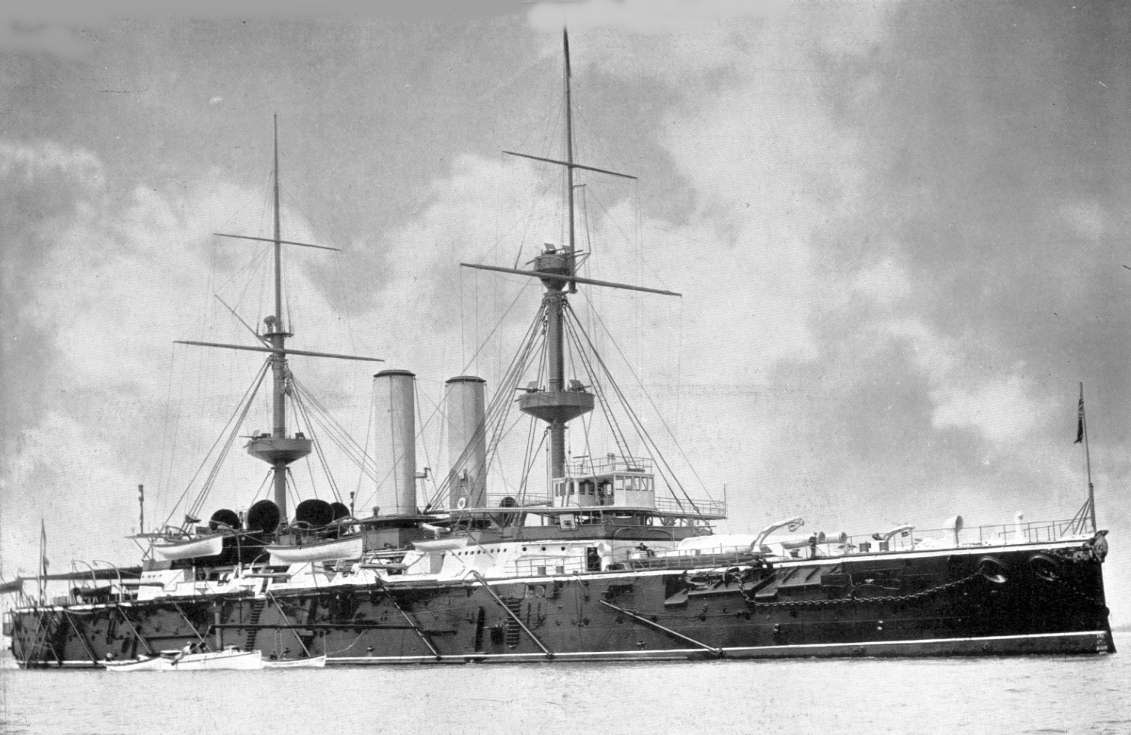
- HMS Royal Sovereign at anchor, about 1897

History

United Kingdom
- Name: Royal Sovereign
- Ordered: Naval Defence Act 1889
- Builder: Portsmouth Dockyard
- Laid down: 30 September 1889
- Launched: 26 February 1891
- Sponsored by: Queen Victoria
- Completed: May 1892
- Commissioned: 31 May 1892
- Decommissioned: 9 September 1909
- Fate: Sold for scrap, 7 October 1913

General characteristics (as built)
- Class & type: Royal Sovereign-class predreadnought battleship
- Displacement: 14,150 long tons (14,380 t) (normal)
- Length: 380 ft (115.8 m) (pp) 410.5 ft (125.1 m) (oa)
- Beam: 75 ft (22.9 m)
- Draught: 27 ft 6 in (8.4 m)
- Installed power: 11,000 ihp (8,200 kW); 8 cylindrical boilers
- Propulsion: 2 shafts; 2 Triple-expansion steam engines
- Speed: 17.5 knots (32.4 km/h; 20.1 mph)
- Range: 4,720 nmi (8,740 km; 5,430 mi) @ 10 knots (19 km/h; 12 mph)
- Complement: 670
- Armament: 2 × twin 13.5-inch (343 mm) guns; 10 × single 6-inch (152 mm) guns; 10 × single 6-pdr (57 mm (2.2 in)) guns; 12 × single 3-pdr (47 mm (1.9 in)) guns; 7 × 18 in (450 mm) torpedo tubes
- Armour: Main belt: 14–18 in (356–457 mm); bulkheads: 14–16 in (356–406 mm); Barbettes: 11–17 in (279–432 mm); Casemates: 6 in (152 mm); Conning tower: 14 in (356 mm); Deck: 2.5–3 in (64–76 mm)

HMS Royal Sovereign was the lead ship of the seven ships in her class of pre-dreadnought battleships built for the Royal Navy in the 1890s. The ship was commissioned in 1892 and served as the flagship of the Channel Fleet for the next five years. She was transferred to the Mediterranean Fleet in 1897 and returned home in 1902, and was briefly assigned as a coast guard ship before she began a lengthy refit in 1903–1904. Royal Sovereign was reduced to reserve in 1905 and was taken out of service in 1909. The ship was sold for scrap four years later and subsequently broken up in Italy.

== Design and description ==
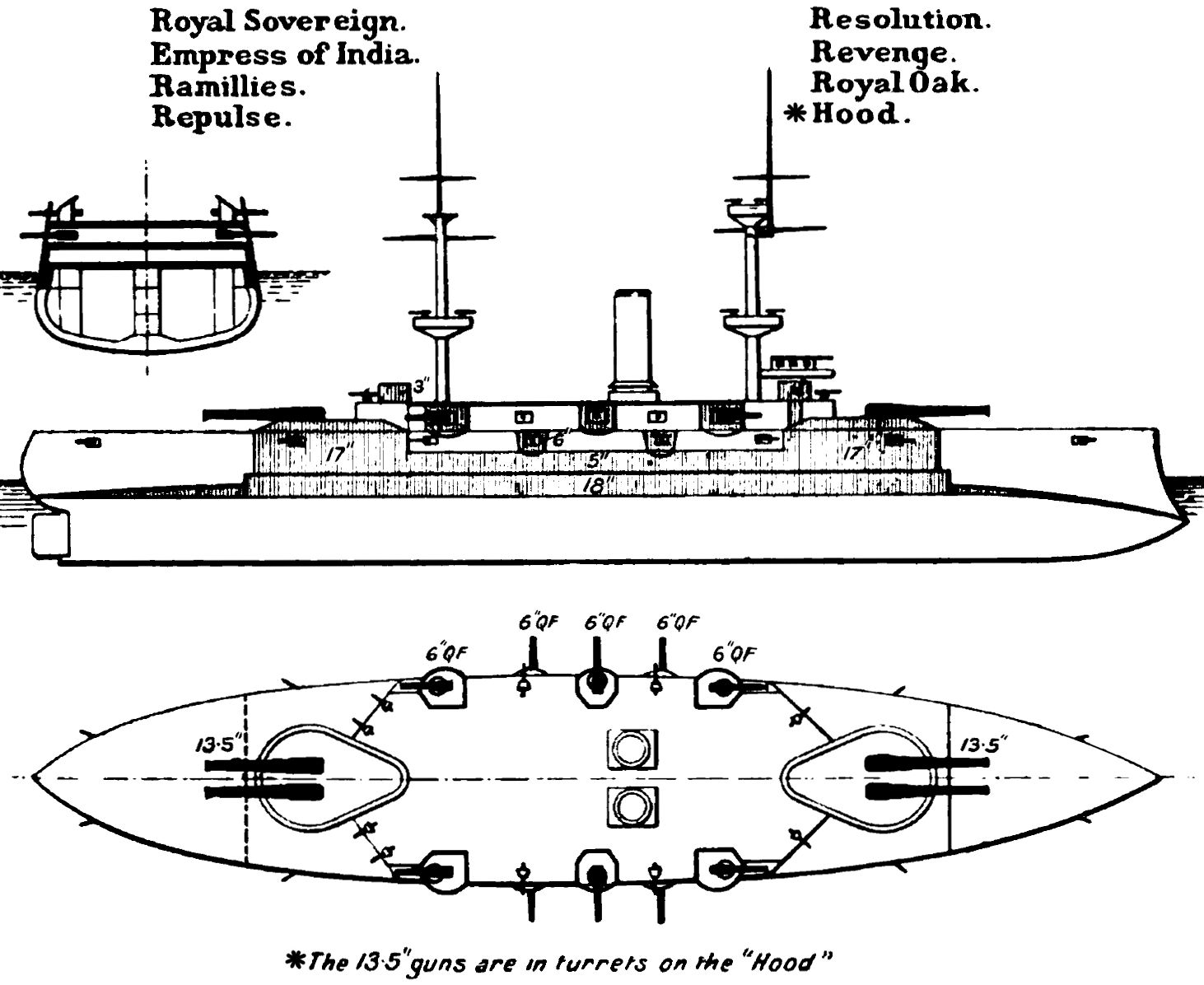
Right plan and elevation of the Royal Sovereign class from Brassey's Naval Annual 1906

The design of the Royal Sovereign-class ships was derived from that of the Admiral-class ironclad battleships, greatly enlarged to improve seakeeping and to provide space for a secondary armament as in the preceding Trafalgar-class ironclad battleships. The ships displaced 14,150 long tons (14,380 t) at normal load and 15,580 long tons (15,830 t) at deep load. They had a length between perpendiculars of 380 feet (115.8 m) and an overall length of 410 feet 6 inches (125.1 m), a beam of 75 feet (22.9 m), and a draught of 27 feet 6 inches (8.4 m). Their crew consisted of 670 officers and ratings.

The Royal Sovereigns were powered by a pair of three-cylinder, vertical triple-expansion steam engines, each driving one shaft. Her Humphrys & Tennant engines were designed to produce a total of 11,000 indicated horsepower (8,200 kW) and a maximum speed of 17.5 knots (32.4 km/h; 20.1 mph) using steam provided by eight cylindrical boilers with forced draught. Royal Sovereign was the first ship of the class to be completed, and was put through a lengthy set of steam trials of which only a few sets of figures have survived. She made 16.41 knots (30.39 km/h; 18.88 mph) over eight hours from 9,661 ihp (7,204 kW) using normal draught and 18 knots (33 km/h; 21 mph) over three hours from 13,360 ihp (9,960 kW) using forced draught. Some of her boiler tubes were observed to crack and leak under the pressures involved; as a result, the Navy decided not to push the boilers of the Royal Sovereign class past 11,000 ihp to prevent similar damage. The ships carried a maximum of 1,420 long tons (1,443 t) of coal, which gave them a range of 4,720 nautical miles (8,740 km; 5,430 mi) at a speed of 10 knots (19 km/h; 12 mph).

Their main armament consisted of four breech-loading (BL) 13.5-inch (343 mm) guns mounted in two twin-gun barbettes, one each fore and aft of the superstructure. Each gun was provided with 80 rounds. Their secondary armament consisted of ten quick-firing (QF) 6-inch (152 mm) guns. 200 rounds per gun were carried by the ships. Sixteen QF 6-pounder (2.2 in (57 mm)) guns of an unknown type and a dozen QF 3-pounder (1.9 in (47 mm)) Hotchkiss guns were fitted for defence against torpedo boats. The two 3-pounders in the upper fighting top were removed in 1903–1904 and all of the remaining light guns from the lower fighting tops and main deck followed in 1905–1909. The Royal Sovereign-class ships mounted seven 14-inch (356 mm) torpedo tubes, although Royal Sovereign had four of hers removed in 1903–04.

The Royal Sovereigns' armour scheme was similar to that of the Trafalgars, as the waterline belt of compound armour only protected the area between the barbettes. The 14–18-inch (356–457 mm) belt and transverse bulkheads 14–16 inches (356–406 mm) thick closed off the ends of the belt. Above the belt was a strake of 4-inch (102 mm) Harvey armour closed off by 3-inch (76 mm) oblique bulkheads. The barbettes were protected by compound armour, ranging in thickness from 11 to 17 inches (279 to 432 mm) and the casemates for the 6-inch guns were protected by an equal thickness of armour. The thicknesses of the armour deck ranged from 2.5 to 3 inches (64 to 76 mm). The walls of the forward conning tower were 12–14 inches (305–356 mm) thick and the aft conning tower was protected by 3-inch plates.

== Construction and career ==
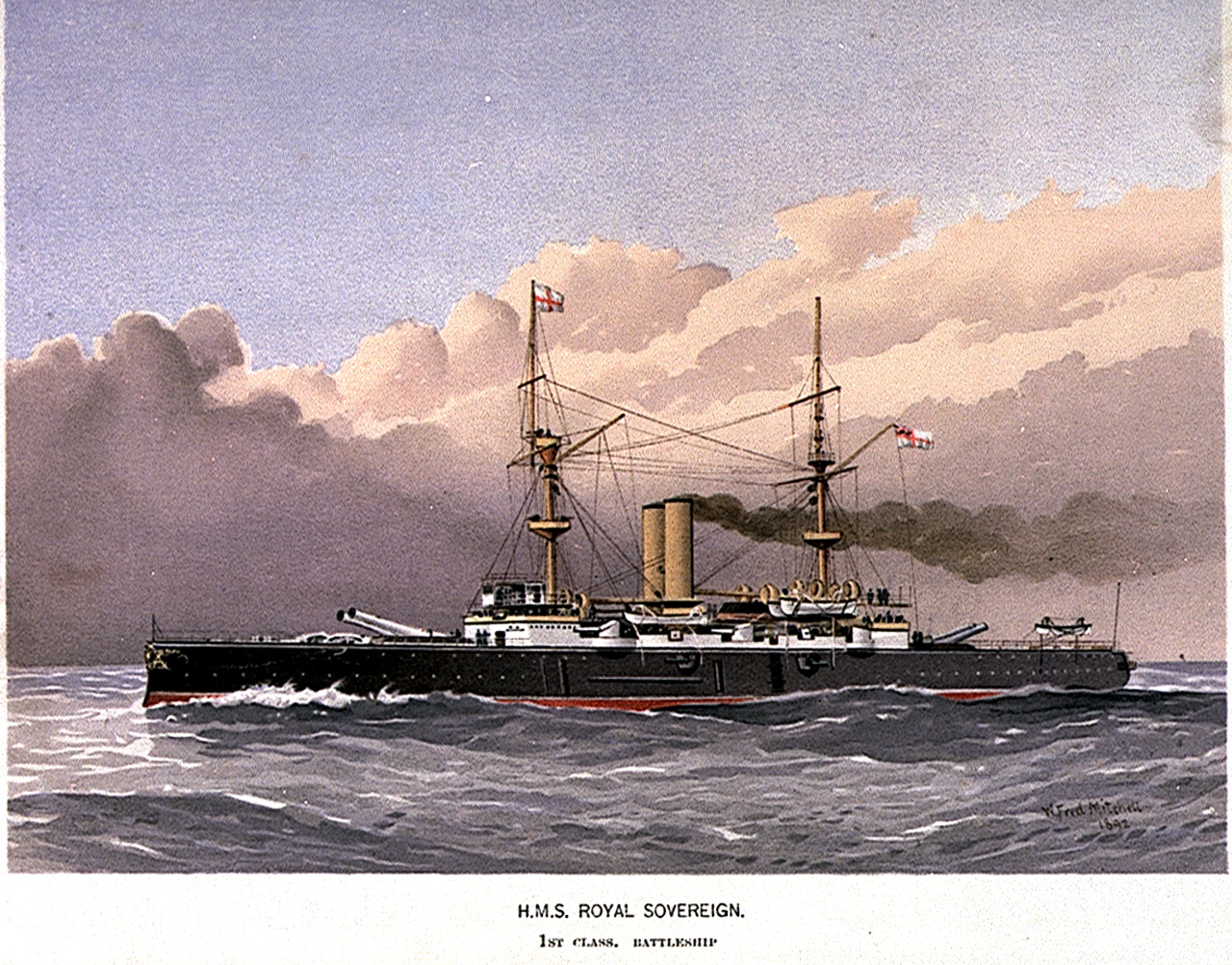
A painting of Royal Sovereign at sea in 1892

The Royal Sovereign class was ordered as part of the Naval Defence Act 1889 that was a supplement to the normal naval estimates. Royal Sovereign, the seventh ship of her name to serve with the Royal Navy, was laid down on 30 September 1889 in a drydock because Portsmouth Dockyard lacked a slipway long enough to accommodate her. The ship was floated out of dock on 26 February 1891 and christened by Queen Victoria. She completed her sea trials in May 1892 and was commissioned on 31 May at a cost of £913,986. Royal Sovereign relieved the battleship HMS Camperdown as flagship of the Channel Squadron. From then until 13 August 1892, she served as the flagship of the "Red Fleet" in the annual manoeuvres off the coast of Ireland. She reprised her role as the flagship of the Red Fleet, from 27 July to 6 August 1893 during the manoeuvres in the Irish Sea and the Western Approaches. To reduce her rolling, she was fitted with bilge keels in 1894–95. In June 1895, Royal Sovereign and three of her sister ships were part of a British naval squadron that attended the opening of the Kaiser Wilhelm Canal in Germany. During the third week of July 1896, the ship took part in annual manoeuvres in the Irish Sea and off the southwest coast of England as part of "Fleet A".

On 7 June 1897, Royal Sovereign paid off and her crew was transferred to the battleship Mars which relieved her in the Channel Squadron. The next day, she recommissioned to relieve the battleship Trafalgar in the Mediterranean Sea. Before departing for the Mediterranean, she took part in the Fleet Review for the Diamond Jubilee of Queen Victoria at Spithead on 26 June 1897, and from 7–11 July took part in annual manoeuvres off the coast of Ireland. She finally departed England for the Mediterranean in September. Upon arrival, Royal Sovereign joined the Mediterranean Fleet. On 18 January 1899, Rear-Admiral Gerard Noel, Second-in-Command of the Mediterranean Fleet, hoisted his flag aboard the ship and Captain Charles Henry Adair was appointed in command two days later. The following month the ship toured Italian waters, visiting Naples, Genoa, Palermo and Syracuse. On 14 July, she visited Fiume (modern Rijeka), Croatia, in company with four other battleships, departing five days later. On the 28th, one man was killed aboard Royal Sovereign in a gun accident and he was buried at sea that evening.

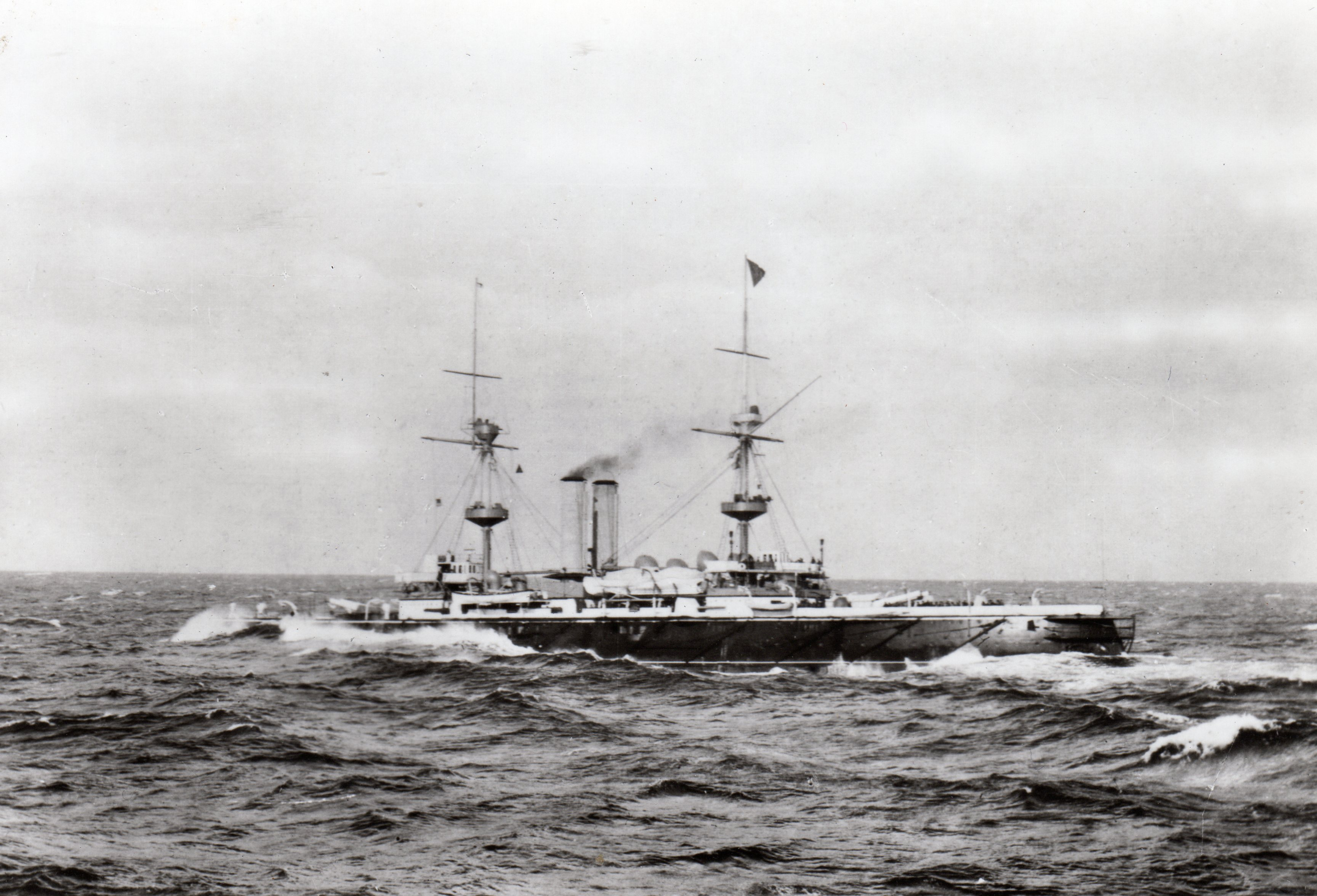
A 1913 postcard showing Royal Sovereign at sea

On 9 November 1901, off Greece, one of her six-inch guns exploded when the breech was not fully closed, killing one officer (Captain Humphry Weston Spurway of Oakford, Devon) and five Royal Marines and injuring one officer (Sir Robert Keith Arbuthnot, 4th Bt) and 19 seamen. Captain Frederick Inglefield was appointed in command on 26 November 1901. After being relieved in the Mediterranean by the battleship London, Royal Sovereign departed Gibraltar on 9 July 1902, arriving at Portsmouth, England, on 14 July 1902. She served as flagship to Sir Charles Frederick Hotham, Commander-in-Chief, Portsmouth, during the fleet review held at Spithead on 16 August 1902 for the coronation of King Edward VII. Paid-off at Portsmouth on 29 August, she immediately re-commissioned under Captain George Primrose and the crew of HMS Trafalgar, to take that ship′s place as a coast guard ship at Portsmouth, as part of the home squadron. Captain Thomas MacGill was appointed in command on 15 December 1902, and was succeeded by Captain Alfred Wyndham Paget in May 1903. From 5–9 August 1903, the ship participated in manoeuvres off the coast of Portugal. From 1903 to 1904, she underwent an extensive refit at Portsmouth during which six-inch armoured casemates were added for the six-inch guns. On 9 February 1907, Royal Sovereign commissioned as a special service vessel in reserve. As such, she was incorporated into the 4th Division of the Home Fleet with other such vessels in April 1909. In September 1909, Royal Sovereign was taken out of service and she was sold for scrap to G. Clarkson & Son for £40,000 on 7 October 1913. They resold her to GB Berterello of Genoa and the ship was demolished there.
