= HMS Revenge (1892) =

Royal Sovereign-class battleship

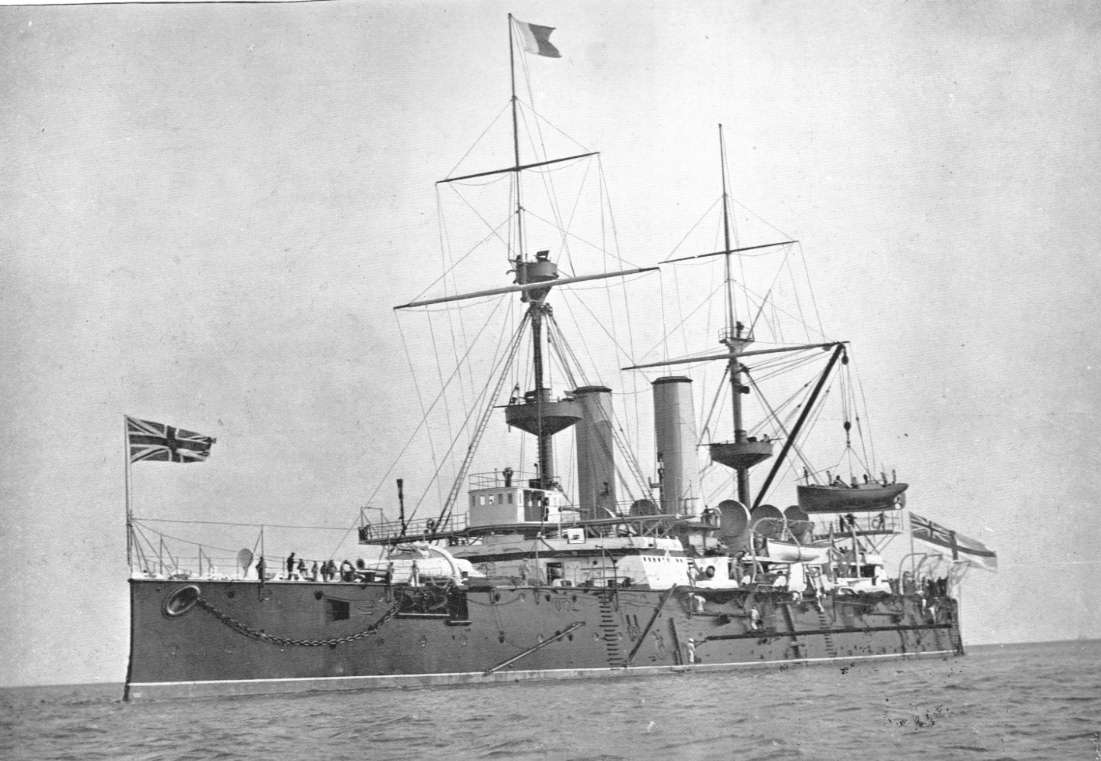
- Revenge at anchor, about 1897

History

United Kingdom
- Name: Revenge
- Builder: Palmers
- Cost: £954,825
- Laid down: 12 February 1891
- Launched: 3 November 1892
- Completed: 22 March 1894
- Commissioned: 14 January 1896
- Decommissioned: October 1915
- Renamed: Redoubtable, 2 August 1915
- Fate: Sold for scrap, 6 November 1919

General characteristics (as built)
- Class & type: Royal Sovereign-class predreadnought battleship
- Displacement: 14,150 long tons (14,380 t) (normal)
- Length: 380 ft (115.8 m) (pp)
- Beam: 75 ft (22.9 m)
- Draught: 27 ft 6 in (8.4 m)
- Installed power: 11,000 ihp (8,200 kW); 8 cylindrical boilers
- Propulsion: 2 shafts; 2 Triple-expansion steam engines
- Speed: 17.5 knots (32.4 km/h; 20.1 mph)
- Range: 4,720 nmi (8,740 km; 5,430 mi) @ 10 knots (19 km/h; 12 mph)
- Complement: 695 (as flagship, 1903)
- Armament: 2 × twin 13.5 in (343 mm) guns; 10 × single 6 in (152 mm) guns; 16 × single 6-pdr (57 mm (2.2 in)) guns; 12 × single 3-pdr (47 mm (1.9 in)) guns; 7 × 18-inch (450 mm) torpedo tubes
- Armour: Main belt: 14–18 in (356–457 mm); bulkheads: 14–16 in (356–406 mm); Barbettes: 11–17 in (279–432 mm); Casemates: 6 in (152 mm); Conning tower: 14 in (356 mm); Deck: 2.5–3 in (64–76 mm)

HMS Revenge was one of seven Royal Sovereign-class pre-dreadnought battleships built for the Royal Navy during the 1890s. She spent much of her early career as a flagship for the Flying Squadron and in the Mediterranean, Home and Channel Fleets. Revenge was assigned to the International Squadron blockading Crete during the 1897–1898 revolt there against the Ottoman Empire. She was placed in reserve upon her return home in 1900, and was then briefly assigned as a coast guard ship before she joined the Home Fleet in 1902. The ship became a gunnery training ship in 1906 until she was paid off in 1913.

Revenge was recommissioned the following year, after the start of World War I, to bombard the coast of Flanders as part of the Dover Patrol, during which she was hit four times, but was not seriously damaged. She had anti-torpedo bulges fitted in early 1915, the first ship to be fitted with them operationally. The ship was renamed Redoubtable later that year and was refitted as an accommodation ship by the end of the year. The last surviving member of her class, the ship was sold for scrap in November 1919.

== Design and description ==
The design of the Royal Sovereign-class ships was derived from that of the Admiral-class ironclad battleships, greatly enlarged to improve seakeeping and to provide space for a secondary armament as in the preceding Trafalgar-class ironclad battleships. The ships displaced 14,150 long tons (14,380 t) at normal load and 15,580 long tons (15,830 t) at deep load. They had a length between perpendiculars of 380 feet (115.8 m) and an overall length of 410 feet 6 inches (125.1 m), a beam of 75 feet (22.9 m), and a draught of 27 feet 6 inches (8.4 m). As a flagship, Revenge's crew consisted of 695 officers and ratings in 1903.

The Royal Sovereigns were powered by a pair of three-cylinder, vertical triple-expansion steam engines, each driving one shaft. Their Humphrys & Tennant engines were designed to produce a total of 11,000 indicated horsepower (8,200 kW) and a maximum speed of 17.5 knots (32.4 km/h; 20.1 mph) using steam provided by eight cylindrical boilers with forced draught. The ships carried a maximum of 1,420 long tons (1,443 t) of coal which gave them a range of 4,720 nautical miles (8,740 km; 5,430 mi) at a speed of 10 knots (19 km/h; 12 mph).

Their main armament consisted of four breech-loading (BL) 13.5-inch (343 mm) guns mounted in two twin-gun barbettes, one each fore and aft of the superstructure. Each gun was provided with 80 rounds. Their secondary armament consisted of ten quick-firing (QF) 6-inch (152 mm) guns. 200 rounds per gun were carried by the ships. Sixteen QF 6-pounder (2.2 in (57 mm)) guns of an unknown type and a dozen QF 3-pounder (1.9 in (47 mm)) Hotchkiss guns were fitted for defence against torpedo boats. The two 3-pounders in the upper fighting top were removed in 1903–1904, and all of the remaining light guns from the lower fighting tops and main deck followed in 1905–1909. The Royal Sovereign-class ships mounted seven 14-inch (356 mm) torpedo tubes, although Revenge had four of hers removed in 1902.

The Royal Sovereigns' armour scheme was similar to that of the Trafalgars, as the waterline belt of compound armour only protected the area between the barbettes. The 14–18-inch (356–457 mm) belt and transverse bulkheads 14–16 inches (356–406 mm) thick closed off the ends of the belt. Above the belt was a strake of 4-inch (102 mm) nickel-steel armour closed off by 3-inch (76 mm) transverse bulkheads.

The barbettes were protected by compound armour, ranging in thickness from 11 to 17 inches (279 to 432 mm) and the casemates for the 6-inch guns had a thickness equal to their diameter. The thicknesses of the armour deck ranged from 2.5 to 3 inches (64 to 76 mm). The walls of the forward conning tower were 12–14 inches (305–356 mm) thick and the aft conning tower was protected by 3-inch plates.

== Construction ==
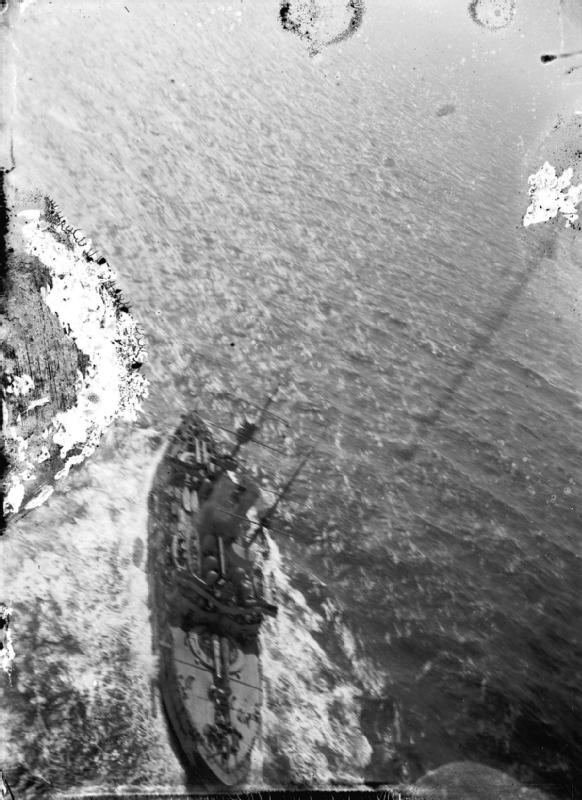
Aerial view of Revenge taken by Samuel Cody during naval trials of observation kites in 1908.

Revenge was the ninth ship of her name to serve in the Royal Navy and was ordered under the Naval Defence Act Programme of 1889. The ship was laid down by Palmers Shipbuilding and Iron Company at their shipyard in Jarrow in Tyne and Wear, England, on 12 February 1891. She was floated out of the drydock on 3 November 1892, and completed on 22 March 1894 at a cost of £954,825.

== Operational history ==
=== 1892-1896 ===
The Revenge was immortalised in the painting "The Revenge leaving Jarrow" by Niels Moeller Lund which “managed to give picturesqueness to such a strictly utilitarian place as the Jarrow works”. Upon completion, she was placed in reserve at Portsmouth where almost two years later, she mobilised on 14 January 1896 as flagship of the Particular Service Squadron, soon renamed the Flying Squadron, which was formed in response to rising tensions in Europe following the Jameson Raid and Germany's Kaiser Wilhelm II's telegram of support to the Boer government. The squadron was briefly attached to the Mediterranean Fleet in the middle of the year. When it was disbanded on 5 November, Revenge relieved the battleship HMS Trafalgar as the flagship of the second-in-command of the Mediterranean Fleet.

Illustration of units of the International Squadron arriving at Suda Bay, Crete, on 21 December 1898. The French protected cruiser Bugeaud, carrying Prince George of Greece and Denmark, who will take up duty as High Commissioner of the Cretan State, leads the column. She is followed (right to left) by the Russian armored cruiser Gerzog Edinburgski, HMS Revenge, and the Italian battleship Francesco Morosini.

=== International Squadron ===
From February 1897 to December 1898, Revenge served in the International Squadron, a multinational force made up of ships of the Austro-Hungarian Navy, French Navy, Imperial German Navy, Italian Royal Navy (Regia Marina), Imperial Russian Navy, and Royal Navy that intervened in the 1897-1898 Greek uprising on Crete against rule by the Ottoman Empire. She served as flagship of the British component of the squadron, initially under Rear-Admiral Robert Harris, and later under Rear-Admiral Gerard Noel, and played a very active role in the International Squadron's operations. Leading a Royal Navy force that reinforced the battleship HMS Barfleur, the British ship on station at Crete when unrest broke out in early February 1897, Revenge and the battleship HMS Rodney arrived at Canea (now Chania) on 9 February 1897. She contributed personnel to an international landing force of sailors and marines the squadron put ashore at Canea on 15 February 1897. On 21 February 1897, she joined the British torpedo gunboats HMS Dryad and HMS Harrier, the Russian battleship Imperator Aleksandr II, the Austro-Hungarian armored cruiser SMS Kaiserin und Königin Maria Theresia, and the German protected cruiser SMS Kaiserin Augusta in the International Squadron's first direct offensive action, a brief bombardment of Cretan insurgent positions on the heights east of Canea after the insurgents refused the squadron's order to take down a Greek flag they had raised, and she hit the farmstead that served as the insurgents′ base of operations with three 6-inch (152-mm) shells. After a bombardment by the British battleship HMS Camperdown on 26 and 27 March 1897 forced insurgents to abandon their siege of the Izzeddin Fortress near the entrance to Suda Bay, Revenge put a contingent of Royal Marines ashore that occupied the fortress.

Thanks to the International Squadron's actions, organized fighting on Crete ended in late March 1897, although the insurrection continued. The squadron focused on supporting international occupation forces ashore and enforcing a blockade of Crete and key ports in Greece. After Rear Admiral Noel relieved Rear Admiral Harris on 12 January 1898, Noel withdrew his flag from Crete, and Revenge conducted operations elsewhere. However, a violent riot by Cretan Turks in Candia (now Heraklion) on 6 September 1898, prompted reinforcement of the international forces on Crete, and Revenge arrived with Rear-Admiral Noel aboard on 12 September 1898. In a meeting aboard Revenge on the morning of 13 September 1898, Noel ordered the Ottoman governor, Edhem Pasha, to take a number of actions to ensure that no further violence would take place and deliver the ringleaders of the riot to the British to face trial; when Edhem Pasha expressed reluctance, Revenge and Camperdown conducted a demonstration that convinced him to comply. The riot led the International Squadron to demand the withdrawal of all Ottoman forces from Crete, and when the final Ottoman troops finally departed on 6 November 1898, sailors from Revenge and the British battleship HMS Empress of India supervised their embarkation aboard the British torpedo gunboat HMS Hussar. On 19 December 1898, Revenge, with Noel aboard, joined the Italian battleship Francesco Morosini (carrying the admiral commanding the International Squadron's Italian ships) and the Russian armored cruiser Gerzog Edinburgski (with the senior Russian commander, Rear Admiral Nikolai Skrydlov, aboard) in steaming to Milos with the French protected cruiser Bugeaud, flagship of the International Squadron's overall commander, Rear Admiral Édouard Pottier. At Milos, they rendezvoused with Prince George of Greece and Denmark aboard his yacht. After Prince George boarded Bugeaud on 20 December, Revenge, Francesco Morosini, and Gerzog Edinburgski escorted Bugeaud to Crete, where Prince George disembarked on 21 December 1898 to take office as the High Commissioner of an autonomous Cretan State under the suzerainty of the Ottoman Empire, bringing the Cretan uprising to an end. The International Squadron then dissolved.

=== 1899-1913 ===
In 1899, Revenge suffered a cordite explosion in one of her 6-inch (152-mm) magazines due to spontaneous combustion, but the damage was not very severe because only three cartridges detonated. In April 1900, the battleship Victorious replaced her in the Mediterranean and she returned home, paying off into Fleet Reserve at Chatham Dockyard. During this time the ship had a wireless telegraph installed. On 18 April 1901, Revenge was recommissioned at Chatham by Captain Frederic Fisher to relieve Alexandra as both the coast guard ship at Portland and the flagship of Rear Admiral Sir Gerard Noel, Admiral Superintendent of Naval Reserves. In March 1902, she arrived at Portsmouth for a refit that included the provision of casemates for her upper-deck six-inch guns, and her crew was temporarily transferred to the elderly ironclad Hercules, which also took on her duties at Portland. Captain Fisher and his crew were back on board Revenge in early June 1902, following gun trials after the repairs. After the refit, she took part in the fleet review held at Spithead on 16 August 1902 for the coronation of King Edward VII, then commissioned in October 1902 to serve as flagship of the Home Fleet upon its creation.

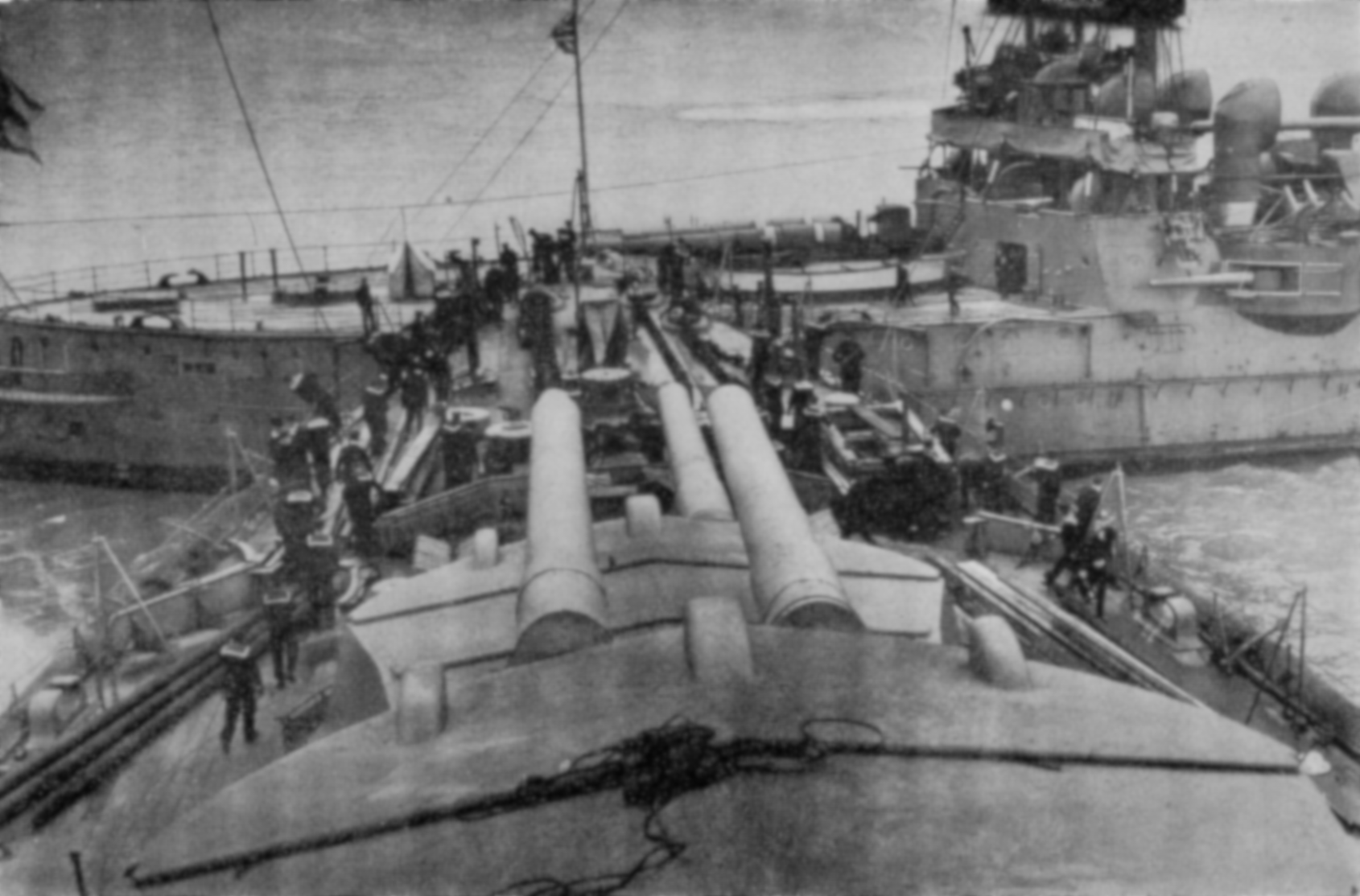
Revenge (background) collided with the battleship Orion (foreground) in Portsmouth in 1912.

In April 1904, Revenge and her sister ship Royal Oak both struck a submerged wreck off the Scilly Isles while serving with the Home Fleet, damaging their bottoms. In July 1905, the ship participated in maneuvers with the Reserve Fleet and was then transferred to the Portsmouth Reserve Division on 1 September 1905. In June 1906, she relieved the battleship Colossus as the gunnery training ship at Portsmouth and was assigned to the gunnery school HMS Excellent. On 13 June 1908, Revenge was struck by the merchant ship SS Bengore Head when the latter was cut loose by her tugboat during a sudden squall in Portsmouth Harbour. In October 1909, she conducted gunnery tests on the obsolete battleship Edinburgh to evaluate the effects of shells against varying thicknesses of armour. On 7 January 1912, the ship was badly damaged when, during a gale at Portsmouth, she broke loose from her moorings and drifted onto the bow of the dreadnought Orion. Later that year, her guns were relined down to 10 inches (254 mm) for testing; the liners were removed in October 1912. Revenge was relieved as a gunnery training ship by the battleship Albemarle and paid off on 15 May 1913. She was laid up at Motherbank, awaiting disposal.

=== World War I ===
Revenge was given a reprieve from the scrapyard by the outbreak of World War I in August 1914. The Admiralty decided to bring her back into service for use in coastal bombardment duties off the coast of Flanders. In September and October 1914, she was refitted at Portsmouth for this mission, which included relining her 13.5-inch guns down to 12 inches (305 mm), improving their range by about 1,000 yards (900 meters). Her refit completed, she was ordered on 31 October 1914 to stand by to relieve the battleship Venerable as flagship of the Dover Patrol. Revenge was declared ready for service on 5 November 1914, and was assigned to the Channel Fleet's new 6th Battle Squadron along with the battleships Albemarle, Cornwallis, Duncan, Exmouth, and Russell. Plans for the squadron to participate in an attack on German submarine bases were cancelled due to bad weather on 14 November 1914, and instead Revenge and the battleship Majestic departed Dover, England, for Dunkirk, France.

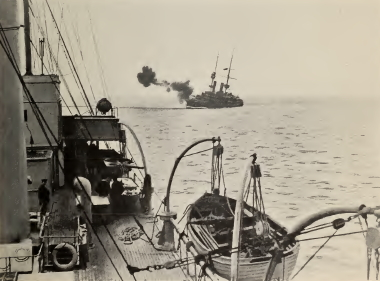
Redoubtable bombarding the Flemish coast in 1915. She has a deliberately induced list to increase the range of her guns.

Revenge participated in her first action of the war when she joined the gunboat Bustard, six British and four French destroyers, and a French torpedo boat in bombarding German troops from off Nieuwpoort, Belgium, on 22 November 1914. On 15–16 December 1914, Revenge bombarded German heavy artillery batteries, being hit twice by 8-inch (203-mm) shells, one of which penetrated her hull below the waterline and caused her to be withdrawn for repairs. In early 1915, the ship participated in experiments using aircraft to observe and control her gunfire, but these were only partially successful. In April and May 1915 she underwent a refit at Chatham Dockyard in which she had anti-torpedo bulges fitted. Afterwards, Revenge conducted trials using sea-based observers on off-shore platforms to direct the bombardment. On 2 August 1915, she was renamed Redoubtable to free the name Revenge for a new dreadnought battleship.

On 7 September 1915, Redoubtable returned to combat, joining the gunboats Bustard and Excellent in bombarding German barracks and gun positions at Westende, inflicting much damage on the Germans. One of her anti-torpedo bulges was deliberately flooded to give her a list that would increase the range of her guns. The ship was hit by a pair of 6-inch shells during the action. Redoubtable underwent another refit from October to December 1915. Afterwards, she was not recommissioned, instead serving as an accommodation ship at Portsmouth until February 1919.

== Disposal ==
Redoubtable was sold to Thos. W. Ward for scrapping for £42,750 on 6 November 1919. She arrived at Swansea for stripping on 16 December 1919, and at Briton Ferry, for final scrapping on 30 September 1921.

== External sources ==
- The Dreadnought Project has a list of commanders
