= HMS Royal Oak (1892) =

Royal Sovereign-class battleship

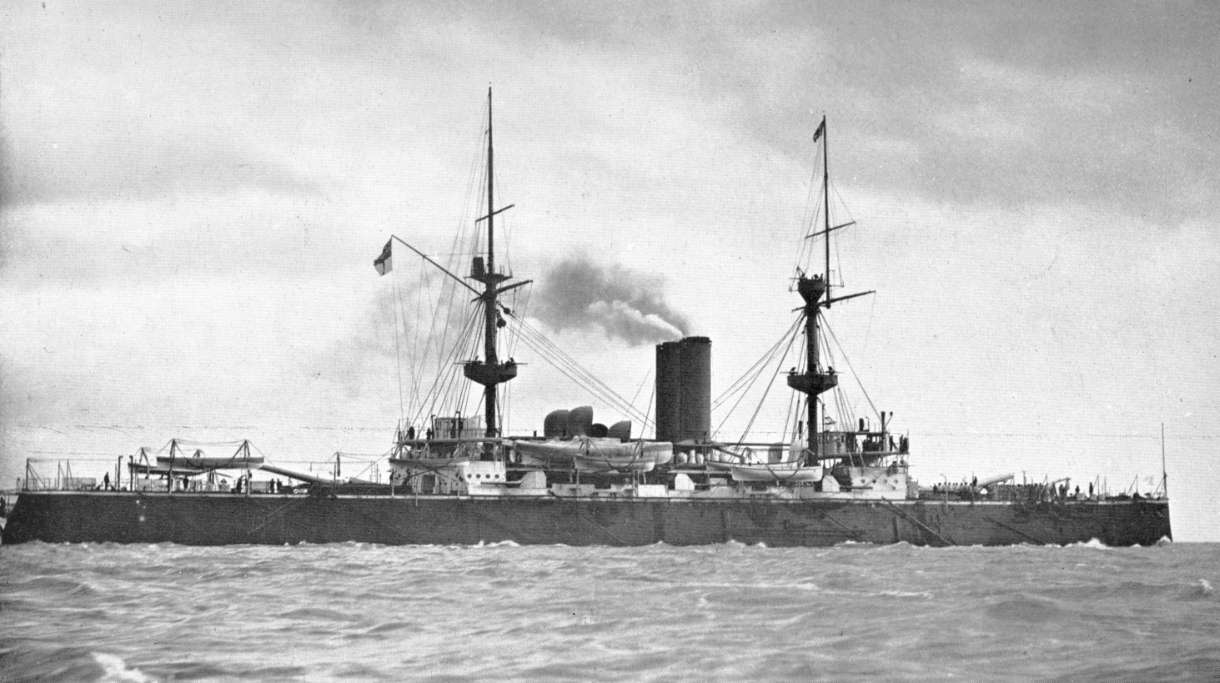
- HMS Royal Oak in 1897

History

United Kingdom
- Name: Royal Oak
- Namesake: The Royal Oak
- Builder: Laird Brothers, Birkenhead
- Cost: £977,996
- Laid down: 29 May 1890
- Launched: 5 November 1892
- Completed: June 1894
- Commissioned: 14 January 1896
- Decommissioned: December 1911
- Fate: Sold for scrap, 14 January 1914

General characteristics (as built)
- Class & type: Royal Sovereign-class predreadnought battleship
- Displacement: 14,150 long tons (14,380 t) (normal)
- Length: 380 ft (115.8 m) (pp)
- Beam: 75 ft (22.9 m)
- Draught: 27 ft 6 in (8.4 m)
- Installed power: 11,000 ihp (8,200 kW); 8 cylindrical boilers
- Propulsion: 2 shafts; 2 Triple-expansion steam engines
- Speed: 17.5 knots (32.4 km/h; 20.1 mph)
- Range: 4,720 nmi (8,740 km; 5,430 mi) @ 10 knots (19 km/h; 12 mph)
- Complement: 692 (as flagship, 1903)
- Armament: 2 × twin 13.5 in (343 mm) guns; 10 × single 6 in (152 mm) guns; 10 × single 6-pdr (57 mm (2.2 in)) guns; 12 × single 3-pdr (47 mm (1.9 in)) guns; 7 × 18-inch (450 mm) torpedo tubes
- Armour: Main belt: 14–18 in (356–457 mm); bulkheads: 14–16 in (356–406 mm); Barbettes: 11–17 in (279–432 mm); Casemates: 6 in (152 mm); Conning tower: 12–14 in (305–356 mm); Deck: 2.5–3 in (64–76 mm)

HMS Royal Oak was one of seven Royal Sovereign-class battleships built for the Royal Navy during the 1890s. Upon her completion in 1894, she was initially placed in reserve until mobilised in 1896 for service with the Flying Squadron. After returning briefly to reserve, the ship was assigned the following year to the Mediterranean Fleet. Royal Oak remained there until 1902 when she returned home; after a refit, the ship was assigned to the Home Fleet, where she served as the flagship of the fleet's second-in-command in 1904–05. Royal Oak was then reduced to reserve until she was taken out of service in 1911. The ship was sold for scrap in early 1914.

== Design and description ==
The design of the Royal Sovereign-class ships was derived from that of the Admiral-class ironclad battleships, greatly enlarged to improve seakeeping and to provide space for a secondary armament as in the preceding Trafalgar-class ironclad battleships. The ships displaced 14,150 long tons (14,380 t) at normal load and 15,580 long tons (15,830 t) at deep load. They had a length between perpendiculars of 380 feet (115.8 m) and an overall length of 410 feet 6 inches (125.1 m), a beam of 75 feet (22.9 m), and a draught of 27 feet 6 inches (8.4 m). Their crew consisted of 670 officers and ratings in 1903.

The Royal Sovereigns were powered by a pair of three-cylinder, vertical triple-expansion steam engines, each driving one shaft. Their engines were designed to produce a total of 11,000 indicated horsepower (8,200 kW) and a maximum speed of 17.5 knots (32.4 km/h; 20.1 mph) using steam provided by eight cylindrical boilers with forced draught. The ships carried a maximum of 1,420 long tons (1,443 t) of coal, which gave them a range of 4,720 nautical miles (8,740 km; 5,430 mi) at a speed of 10 knots (19 km/h; 12 mph).

Their main armament consisted of four breech-loading (BL) 13.5-inch (343 mm) guns mounted in two twin-gun barbettes, one each fore and aft of the superstructure. Each gun was provided with 80 rounds. Their secondary armament consisted of ten quick-firing (QF) 6-inch (152 mm) guns. 200 rounds per gun were carried by the ships. Sixteen QF 6-pounder (2.2 in (57 mm)) guns of an unknown type and a dozen QF 3-pounder (1.9 in (47 mm)) Hotchkiss guns were fitted for defence against torpedo boats. The two 3-pounders in the upper fighting top were removed in 1899–1902 and all of the remaining light guns from the lower fighting tops and main deck followed in 1905–1909. The Royal Sovereign-class ships mounted seven 18-inch (450 mm) torpedo tubes, although Royal Oak had four of hers removed in 1902.

The Royal Sovereigns' armour scheme was similar to that of the Trafalgars, as the waterline belt of compound armour only protected the area between the barbettes. The 14–18-inch (356–457 mm) belt was 238 feet (72.5 m) long and had a total height of 8 feet 8 inches (2.6 m) of which 5 feet (1.5 m) was below water. Transverse bulkheads 14–16 inches (356–406 mm) thick closed off the ends of the belt. Above the belt was a strake of 4-inch (102 mm) nickel-steel armour closed off by 3-inch (76 mm) transverse bulkheads.

The barbettes were protected by compound armour, ranging in thickness from 11 to 17 inches (279 to 432 mm), and the casemates for the 6-inch guns were protected by armour equally thick. The thicknesses of the deck armour ranged from 2.5 to 3 inches (64 to 76 mm). The walls of the forward conning tower were 12–14 inches (305–356 mm) thick and the aft conning tower was protected by 3-inch plates.

== Construction and career ==
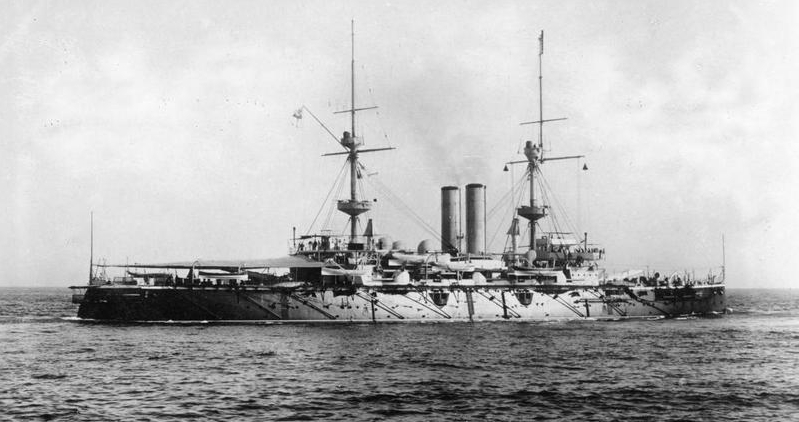
Royal Oak before 1902

The Royal Sovereign class was ordered as part of the Naval Defence Act 1889 that was a supplement to the normal naval estimates. Royal Oak, named after the tree in which King Charles II hid after the Battle of Worcester, was the sixth ship of her name to serve in the Royal Navy. The ship was laid down by Laird Brothers at their shipyard in Birkenhead on 29 May 1890 and floated out of the drydock on 5 November 1892. She arrived at Portsmouth Dockyard on 29 October 1893 for fitting out, completed her sea trials in June 1894, and cost £977,996. Upon completion, Royal Oak was placed in reserve at Portsmouth. Almost two years later, she mobilised there on 14 January 1896 for service in the Particular Service Squadron – later renamed the Flying Squadron – which was formed in response to rising tensions in Europe following the Jameson Raid and Germany's Kaiser Wilhelm II's telegram of support to the Boer government. When the squadron disbanded on 25 November, the ship returned to reserve at Portsmouth.

Royal Oak was recommissioned on 9 March 1897 for service with the Mediterranean Fleet, where she was to relieve the battleship Collingwood. She departed Portsmouth on 24 March 1897, and arrived at Malta on 5 April. Royal Oak was relieved by the battleship Bulwark and departed the Mediterranean in May 1902. She arrived at Plymouth on 16 May, and at Portsmouth the following day, and paid off there on 6 June 1902. She soon moved to Chatham Dockyard for a refit, during which casemates were provided for her six-inch upper deck guns. On 16 February 1903, Royal Oak recommissioned at Portsmouth for service in the Home Fleet using part of the battleship Nile's crew as a nucleus. In the summer of 1903, she participated in combined exercises in the Atlantic involving the Home, Mediterranean, and Channel Fleets, as well as the Cruiser Squadron.

In April 1904, while operating with the Home Fleet off the Scilly Isles, Royal Oak and her sister ship, Revenge, had their bottoms lightly damaged when they struck a sunken wreck. On 9 May 1904, Royal Oak became flagship of the Home Fleet's second-in-command, relieving her sister Empress of India, and took part in annual maneuvers in July and August. On 7 March 1905, Royal Oak paid off at Portsmouth into the Chatham Reserve, and her crew transferred to the battleship Caesar. The following day the ship recommissioned with a skeleton crew for service with the Sheerness-Chatham Division of the newly formed Fleet in Commission in Reserve at Home. While she was under refit at Chatham, an explosion in her small-arms magazine on 11 May killed one workman and injured three others. In July, Royal Oak participated in Reserve Fleet manoeuvres. Her crew was then transferred to the battleship Ocean, and Royal Oak recommissioned with a new nucleus crew to serve as an emergency reserve ship at Chatham.

As a unit of the First Division of the Blue Fleet, Royal Oak took part in annual maneuvers off the coast of Portugal and in the eastern Atlantic from 12 June to 2 July 1906. On 1 January 1907, she recommissioned in reserve at Devonport with a nucleus crew. In April 1909, Royal Oak and the other reserve ships with nucleus crews at Devonport were formed into the 4th Division of the Home Fleet. She relieved her sister Ramillies as the parent ship of the division in June 1911, and was in turn relieved of this duty by her sister Empress of India in November. The ship was taken out of service in December 1911 and towed to the Motherbank by the battleship Bellerophon in August 1912. She was sold to Thos. W. Ward on 14 January 1914 for £36,450 and subsequently broken up at Briton Ferry.
