= HMS Hood (1891) =

Royal Sovereign-class battleship of the Royal Navy scuttled in Portland Harbour

Coordinates: 50°34′09″N 2°25′16″W

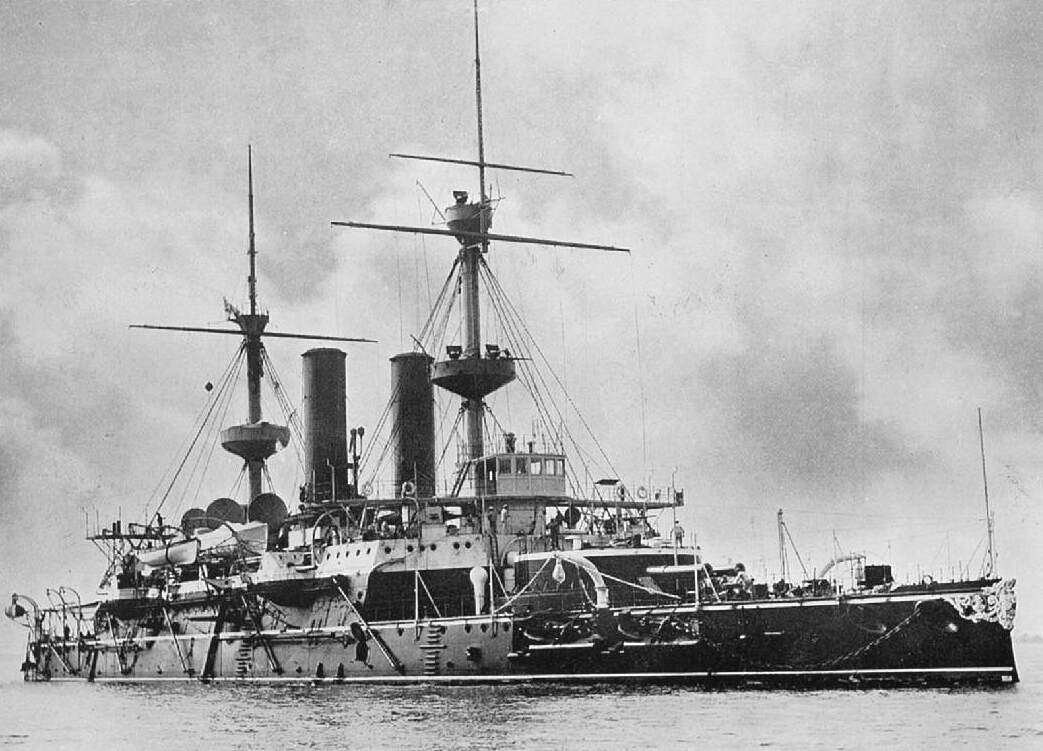
- Hood in the 1890s

History

United Kingdom
- Name: Hood
- Namesake: Admiral Samuel Hood, 1st Viscount Hood; Vice Admiral Sir Samuel Hood
- Ordered: 1889
- Builder: Chatham Dockyard, England
- Cost: £926,396
- Laid down: 12 August 1889
- Launched: 30 July 1891
- Christened: Viscountess Hood
- Commissioned: 1 June 1893
- Decommissioned: March 1911
- Fate: Sunk as a blockship in Portland Harbour 4 November 1914

General characteristics
- Class & type: Royal Sovereign-class pre-dreadnought battleship
- Displacement: 14,780 long tons (15,020 t) (normal); 15,588 long tons (15,838 t) (deep load)
- Length: 410 ft 5 in (125.1 m) (o/a)
- Beam: 75 ft (22.9 m)
- Draught: 27 ft 6 in (8.4 m)
- Installed power: 8 cylindrical boilers; 11,000 ihp (8,200 kW)
- Propulsion: 2 Shafts; 2 Triple-expansion steam engines
- Speed: 17.5 knots (32.4 km/h; 20.1 mph)
- Range: 4,720 nmi (8,740 km; 5,430 mi) at 10 knots (19 km/h; 12 mph)
- Complement: 690
- Armament: 2 × twin 13.5 in (340 mm) guns; 10 × single 6 in (150 mm) guns; 8 × single 6 pdr (2.2 in (57 mm)) guns; 12 × single 3 pdr (1.9 in (47 mm)) guns; 7 × 18 in (450 mm) torpedo tubes
- Armour: Waterline belt: 14–18 in (356–457 mm); Bulkheads: 14–16 in (356–406 mm); Casemates: 6 in (152 mm); Conning tower: 12–14 in (305–356 mm); Deck: 2.5–3 in (64–76 mm); Gun turrets: 11–17 in (279–432 mm)

HMS Hood was a modified Royal Sovereign-class pre-dreadnought battleship built for the Royal Navy in the early 1890s. She differed from the other ships of the class in that she had cylindrical gun turrets instead of barbettes and a lower freeboard. She served most of her active career in the Mediterranean Sea, where her low freeboard was less of a disadvantage. The ship was placed in reserve in 1907 and later became the receiving ship at Queenstown, Ireland. Hood was used in the development of anti-torpedo bulges in 1913 and was scuttled in late 1914 to act as a blockship across the southern entrance of Portland Harbour after the start of World War I.

== Design ==
Hood, the last of the eight Royal Sovereign-class battleships to be built, differed significantly from the other ships of her class in that she had a forward freeboard of only 11 feet 3 inches (3.43 m) compared to 19 feet 6 inches (5.94 m) of the other ships. The Royal Sovereigns had reverted to a higher freeboard after several classes of low-freeboard vessel had been constructed, the last being the Trafalgar class. Low freeboard had been popular for around ten years since it required less armour and made a smaller target for gunfire to hit, although it had the disadvantage that it reduced seaworthiness. This low freeboard meant that Hood was very wet in rough weather and her maximum speed reduced rapidly as the wave height increased, making her only suitable for service in the relatively calm Mediterranean. This was seen as a vindication of the barbette/high-freeboard design in the rest of her class, and all subsequent British battleship classes had high freeboard.

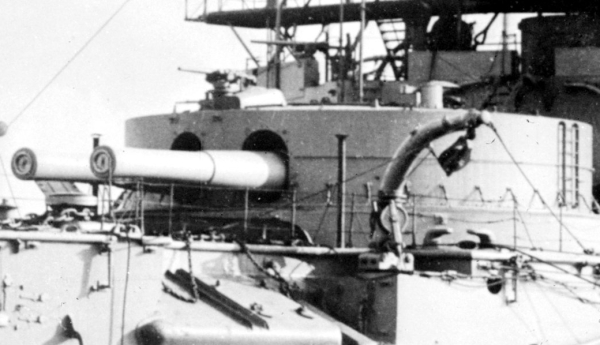
The forward 13.5-inch (343-mm) gun turret on Hood

The lower freeboard was required by her use of armoured gun turrets—a heavy type of rotating gun mounting of the mid-and-late 19th century very different from what would later be known as "turrets". (Note: Modern naval gun turrets are essentially a barbette enclosed by a rotating gunhouse, a very different concept from the older style of turret that Hood mounted.) Hood's half-sisters mounted their guns exposed on top of barbettes, a much lighter arrangement that allowed their freeboard to be substantially increased. The heavy, old-fashioned type of turrets added to the amount of weight high up in the ship compared to barbettes and decreased the ship's stability.

Because the stability of a ship is largely due to freeboard at high rolling angles, she was given a larger metacentric height (the vertical distance between the metacenter and the centre of gravity below it) of around 4.1 feet (1.2 m) instead of the 3.6 feet (1.1 m) of the rest of the Royal Sovereigns to make her roll less in rough seas. This had the effect of making her roll period shorter by around 7% compared to her sisters, which in turn made her gunnery less accurate. Bilge keels were fitted in 1894 which improved her manoeuvrability.

=== General characteristics ===
Hood had an overall length of 410 feet 6 inches (125.1 m), a beam of 75 feet (22.9 m), and a draught of 28 feet 6 inches (8.7 m) at deep load. She displaced 14,780 long tons (15,020 t) at normal load and 15,588 long tons (15,838 t) at deep load. Her crew numbered 690 officers and ratings.

The ship was powered by two 3-cylinder vertical triple-expansion steam engines, each driving one propeller. Eight water-tube boilers provided steam to the engines, which produced a maximum of 11,000 indicated horsepower (8,200 kW) when forced. This was intended to allow them to reach a speed of 17.5 knots (32.4 km/h; 20.1 mph). She carried a maximum of 1,490 long tons (1,510 t) of coal, enough to steam 4,720 nautical miles (8,740 km; 5,430 mi) at 10 knots (19 km/h; 12 mph).

=== Armament ===
The ship was armed with four 32-calibre BL 13.5-inch Mk I–IV guns in two twin gun turrets, one fore and aft of the superstructure. Each gun was provided with 80 shells. Hood's secondary armament consisted of ten 40-calibre 6-inch Mk I-III guns mounted in casemates in the superstructure. A major problem with the four of these guns mounted on the upper deck was that they were mounted low in the ship and were unusable at high speed or in heavy weather. They were removed in 1904. The ship carried 200 rounds for each gun.

Defence against torpedo boats was provided by eight QF 6-pounder guns, although the exact type of gun is not known. Four of these were mounted on the main deck in casemates on the sides of the hull and suffered from the same problems as the six-inch guns. Hood also mounted a dozen QF 3-pounder Hotchkiss guns mounted in the superstructure and fighting tops. Like her sisters, the ship was fitted with seven 18-inch torpedo tubes. Two of these were mounted in the bow below the waterline, four were placed in the sides of the hull, two on each broadside, and one in the stern. These last five tubes were all above water. She also was fitted with a plough-shaped underwater ram.

In 1897 one of these 3-pounder guns was mounted on each turret top and, three years later, the 3-pounders in the fighting tops were transferred to the forward superstructure. At the same time the above-water torpedo tubes were removed. About 1902–03 the 6-pounders on the main deck were removed; two were remounted on the superstructure, but the other two were not replaced. In 1905 the 3-pounders on the forward superstructure were removed while the 3-pounders in the lower fighting tops were removed while the ship was in reserve from 1907–09.

=== Armour ===
Hood's protection used both compound armour and nickel steel armour. Her waterline main belt ranged in thickness between 14 and 18 inches (356 and 457 mm) thick. It covered the middle 250 feet (76.2 m) of the ship and was 8.5 feet (2.6 m) high of which 5 feet 6 inches (1.7 m) was below the waterline at normal load. Fore and aft bulkheads, 16–14-inch (406–356 mm) thick respectively, closed off the ends of the central citadel at the level of the waterline. The upper strake of 4-inch (102 mm) armour was 150 feet (45.7 m) long and protected the ship's side between the barbette (Note: The completely enclosed armoured shields around the turrets were known as barbettes for some years after their introduction, but they weren´t barbettes as we know them today) Oblique bulkheads 3 inches (76 mm) thick connected this strake to the armour protecting the bases of the turrets. The gun turrets and their bases were protected by 17 inches (432 mm) of armour that thinned to 16 inches (406 mm) behind the oblique bulkheads. Below the armoured deck their armour was reduced to 11 inches (279 mm). The armour of the main-deck casemates was 6 inches thick and that of the forward conning tower was 14 inches thick. The armoured deck was 3 inches thick over the machinery, but thinned to 2.5 inches (64 mm) outside the central citadel and ran to the ends of the ship. At the bow it dipped down to reinforce the ship's ram.

== Construction and career ==
Hood was laid down at Chatham Dockyard on 12 August 1889 and was launched on 30 July 1891, the Viscountess Hood christening her. She finished her sea trials in May 1893 and was commissioned on 1 June 1893 at the cost of £926,396. Her assignment to the Mediterranean Fleet was delayed when she sprang a leak in her forward compartments on 7 June 1893 as a result of faulty riveting and excessive strain on the hull when she had been docked. Repairs took only two days, and the ship left Sheerness for the Mediterranean on 18 June 1893. She arrived at Malta on 3 July 1893, relieving the battleship Colossus.

In May 1896, Hood steamed from Malta to Crete to protect British interests and subjects there during unrest among Cretan Greeks who opposed the Ottoman Empire′s rule of the island. In 1897 and 1898, the ship served as part of the International Squadron, a multinational force made up of ships of the Austro-Hungarian Navy, French Navy, Imperial German Navy, Italian Royal Navy (Regia Marina), Imperial Russian Navy, and Royal Navy that intervened in the 1897-1898 Greek uprising on Crete. The squadron, which formed in February 1897, bombarded insurgent forces, put sailors and marines ashore to occupy key cities, and blockaded Crete and key ports in Greece, actions which brought organized fighting on the island to an end by late March 1897. Thereafter, the squadron maintained order on Crete until the island's status finally was resolved by the evacuation of all Ottoman Army forces from Crete in November 1898 and the establishment of an autonomous Cretan State under Ottoman suzerainty in December 1898.

Captain Alvin Coote Corry was appointed in command of Hood in December 1898. She was ordered to return home in March 1900 and paid off into reserve at Chatham Dockyard on 29 April 1900. Seven months later, on 12 December 1900, Hood recommissioned to relieve the elderly ironclad Thunderer as port guard ship at Pembroke Dock.

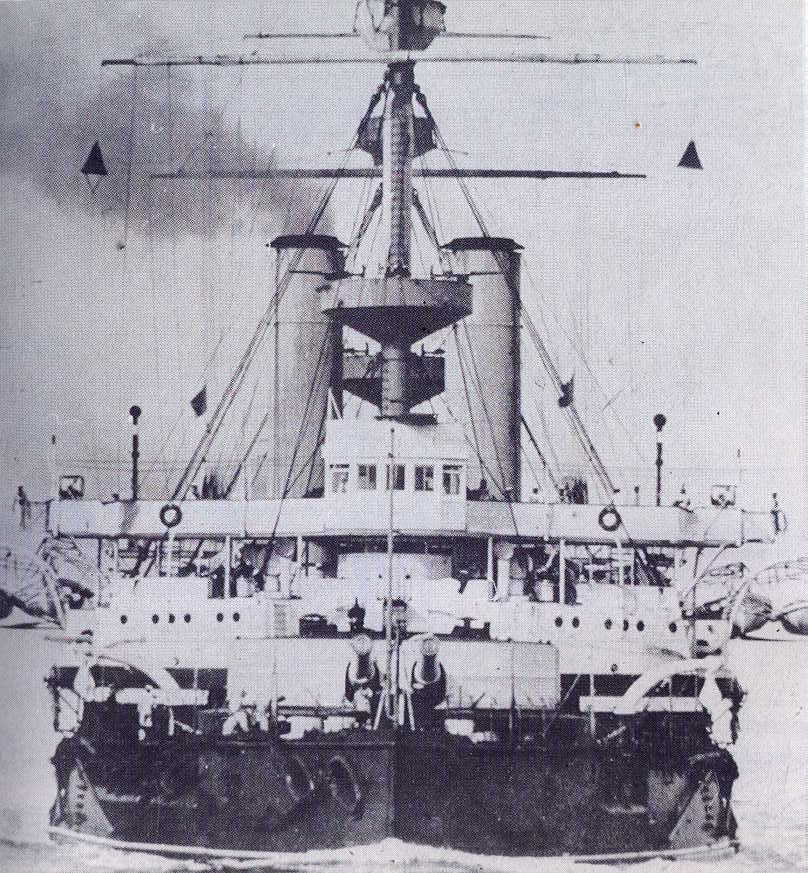
Hood in 1901

The ship rejoined the Mediterranean Fleet at the end of 1901, and Captain Robert Lowry was appointed in command on 1 May 1902. She participated in combined exercises with the Channel Squadron and the Cruiser Squadron off the coasts of Cephalonia and Morea in late 1902. Two days before the exercises ended, Hood damaged her rudder on the seabed while leaving Argostoli Harbor on 4 October 1902. She went first to Malta for temporary repairs, then on to England for permanent repairs at Chatham Dockyard, using her twin screws to steer for the entire voyage. The repairs began after she paid off on 5 December 1902 and she transferred to Devonport for a refit upon their completion.

On 25 June 1903 Hood relieved the battleship Collingwood in the Home Fleet. She took part in combined exercises of the Channel Fleet, Mediterranean Fleet, and Home Fleet off the coast of Portugal from 5 to 9 August 1903. The battleship Russell relieved Hood on 28 September 1904. Hood was placed into reserve at Devonport on 3 January 1905, where she remained until February 1907. In April 1909, the ship was refitted and partially stripped at Devonport, after which she began service as a receiving ship at Queenstown, Ireland. In September 1910 Hood recommissioned to serve as flagship of the Senior Naval Officer, Coast of Ireland Station, while continuing as a receiving ship. On 2 April 1911 the ship was in Cork Harbour for the 1911 Census.

Later in 1911, Hood was towed to Portsmouth and listed for disposal. During 1913 and 1914 she was employed as a target for underwater protection experiments and was used in secret tests of anti-torpedo bulges. Subsequently, she was photographed in dry dock at Portsmouth by the crew of Naval Airship No. 18 in June 1914, before being placed on the sale list in August 1914. On 4 November 1914 Hood was scuttled in Portland harbour to block the Southern Ship Channel, a potential access route for U-boats or for torpedoes fired from outside the harbour. Her wreck became known as "Old Hole in the Wall". Despite her 1914 scuttling, the Royal Navy included Hood on its sale list in both 1916 and 1917.

The ship's bell was later used as one of at least two bells on the battlecruiser HMS Hood. Before being installed on the battlecruiser, the bell was inscribed around the base with the words: "This bell was preserved from HMS Hood battleship 1891–1914 by the late rear admiral, The Honourable Sir Horace Hood KCB, DSO, MVO killed at Jutland on 31st May 1916."

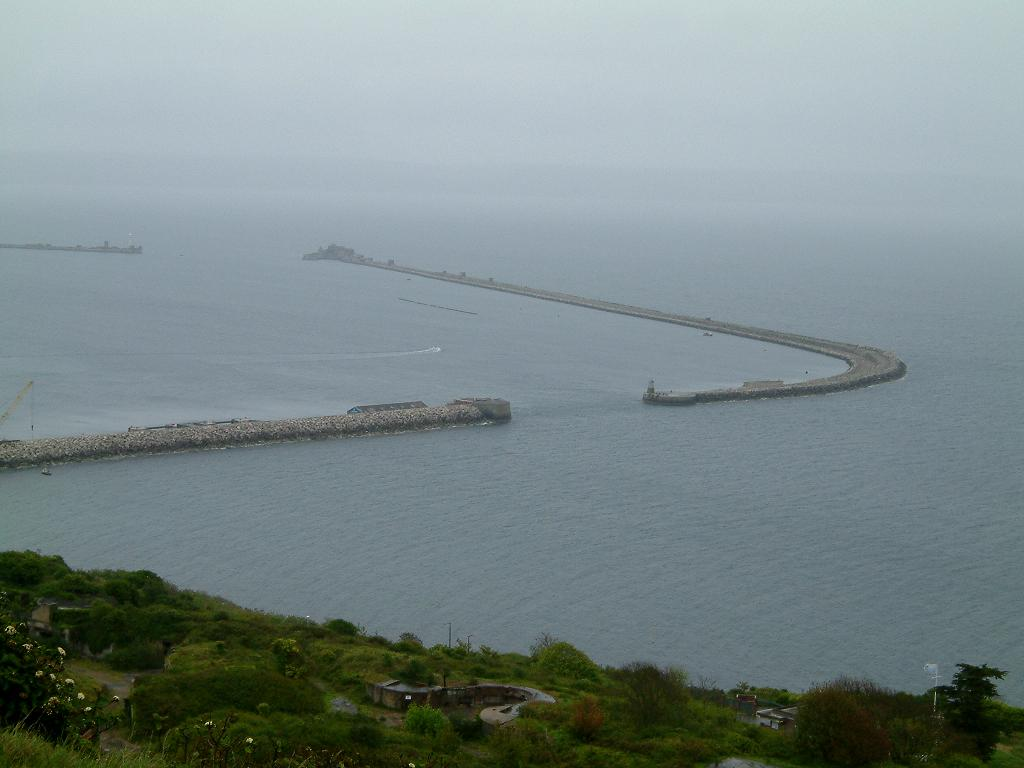
The outline of the wreck of Hood can be seen between the breakwaters of Portland Harbour.
