= HMS Trafalgar (1887) =

British battleship

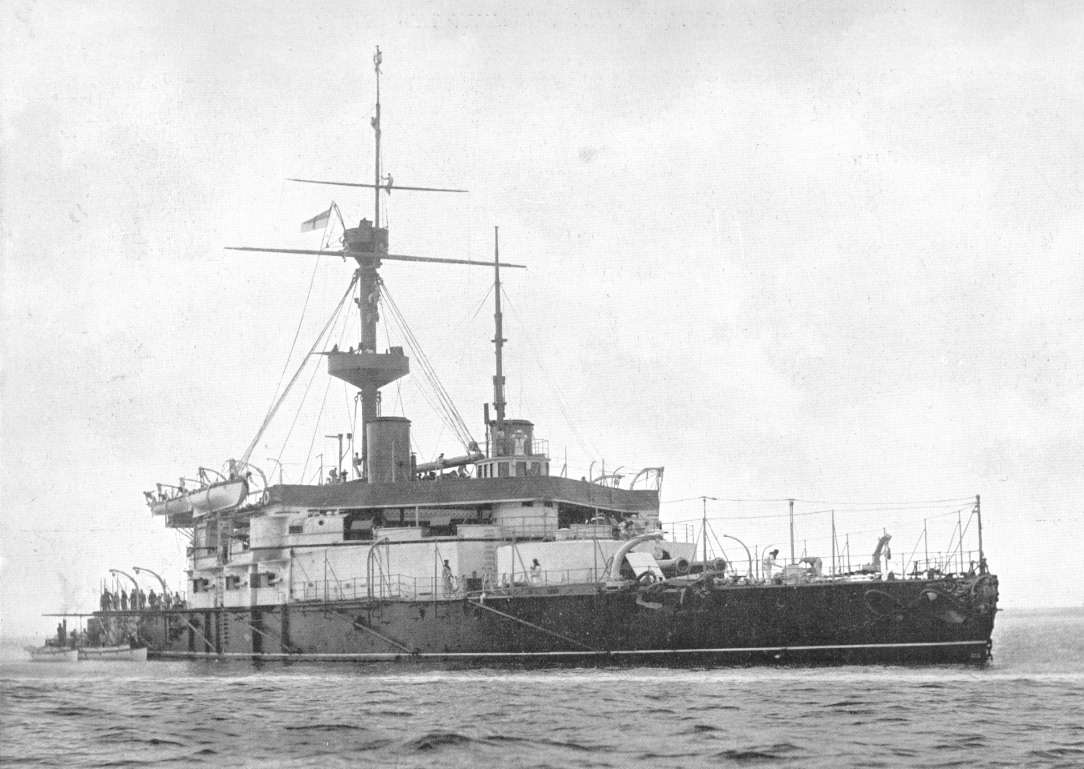
- HMS Trafalgar before her funnels were raised in April 1891.

History

United Kingdom
- Name: Trafalgar
- Namesake: Battle of Trafalgar
- Builder: Portsmouth Dockyard
- Laid down: 18 January 1886
- Launched: 20 September 1887
- Commissioned: 2 April 1890
- Fate: Sold for scrapping 9 April 1912

General characteristics
- Class & type: Trafalgar-class battleship
- Displacement: 12,590 tons
- Length: 345 ft (105 m) p/p
- Beam: 73 ft (22 m)
- Draught: 28 ft 6 in (8.69 m)
- Propulsion: 2-shaft Humphries triple expansion; 7,500 ihp (5,600 kW) normal draught, 12,102 ihp (9,024 kW) forced draught
- Speed: 15.1 knots (28.0 km/h; 17.4 mph) normal draught; 17.2 knots (31.9 km/h; 19.8 mph) forced draught
- Complement: 577
- Armament: 4 × BL 13.5-inch (343 mm) guns; 6 × QF 4.7-inch (120-mm) guns; 8 × 6-pounder (57 mm) guns; 9 × QF 3-pounder (47 mm) guns; 6 × torpedo tubes
- Armour: Belt: 20 in (508 mm) amidships, 14 in (356 mm) at ends; Forward Bulkheads: 16 in (406 mm); After bulkhead: 14 in (356 mm); Citadel: 16–18 in (406–457 mm); Turrets: 18 in (457 mm); Conning tower: 14 in (356 mm); Battery bulkheads: 4–5 in (102–127 mm); Deck: 3 in (76 mm)

Service record
- Part of: Mediterranean Fleet (1890–1897); Portsmouth guardship (1898–1902); Home Fleet (1909–1911)

HMS Trafalgar was one of two Trafalgar-class battleships commissioned in 1890 and 1891, the other being HMS Nile. The ship was designed as an improved version of existing battleships with greater displacement and a thicker armoured belt amidships. Trafalgar saw active service as a battleship from 1890 to 1897 and from 1909 to 1911 when she was sold. Between these two periods as a combatant, Trafalgar served as a guardship and as a drill ship.

== Design ==
The two ships were designed to be improved versions of the Admiral and Victoria classes, having a greater displacement to allow for improved protection. However, they sacrificed a full armoured belt for greater thickness amidships in a partial belt.

As originally designed, Trafalgar was to have displaced 11,940 tons, and carried a secondary armament of ten guns of 5-inch (130 mm) calibre, disposed in the broadside battery. Changes made during construction however, led to an increase in displacement to 12,590 tons; this led to the ships draught being increased by 12 inches (300 mm) from the initial design, and 18 inches (460 mm) with full bunkers. This in turn led to the main belt being immersed to a deeper level than had been intended, with a potential decrease in defensive effect in combat.

In October 1896 the secondary battery of 4.7-inch (120 mm) guns was replaced by a more powerful battery of six 6-inch (150 mm) quick firers.

The main artillery, while situated at a militarily effective height of 14 feet (4.3 m) above sea level, were only 42 inches (1,100 mm) above the deck. It was thought possible that firing along the keel line might cause structural damage; tests requested by the Chief Constructor, however, showed the potential damage to be minimal.

As compared to HMS Sans Pareil, Trafalgar's under-water hull form was finer, with a larger rudder. Together with the reduced freeboard as compared to earlier ships, this had a significantly adverse effect on her handling; as she spent her active service in relatively calm water in the Mediterranean, however, this defect was of minimal importance.

== Service history ==
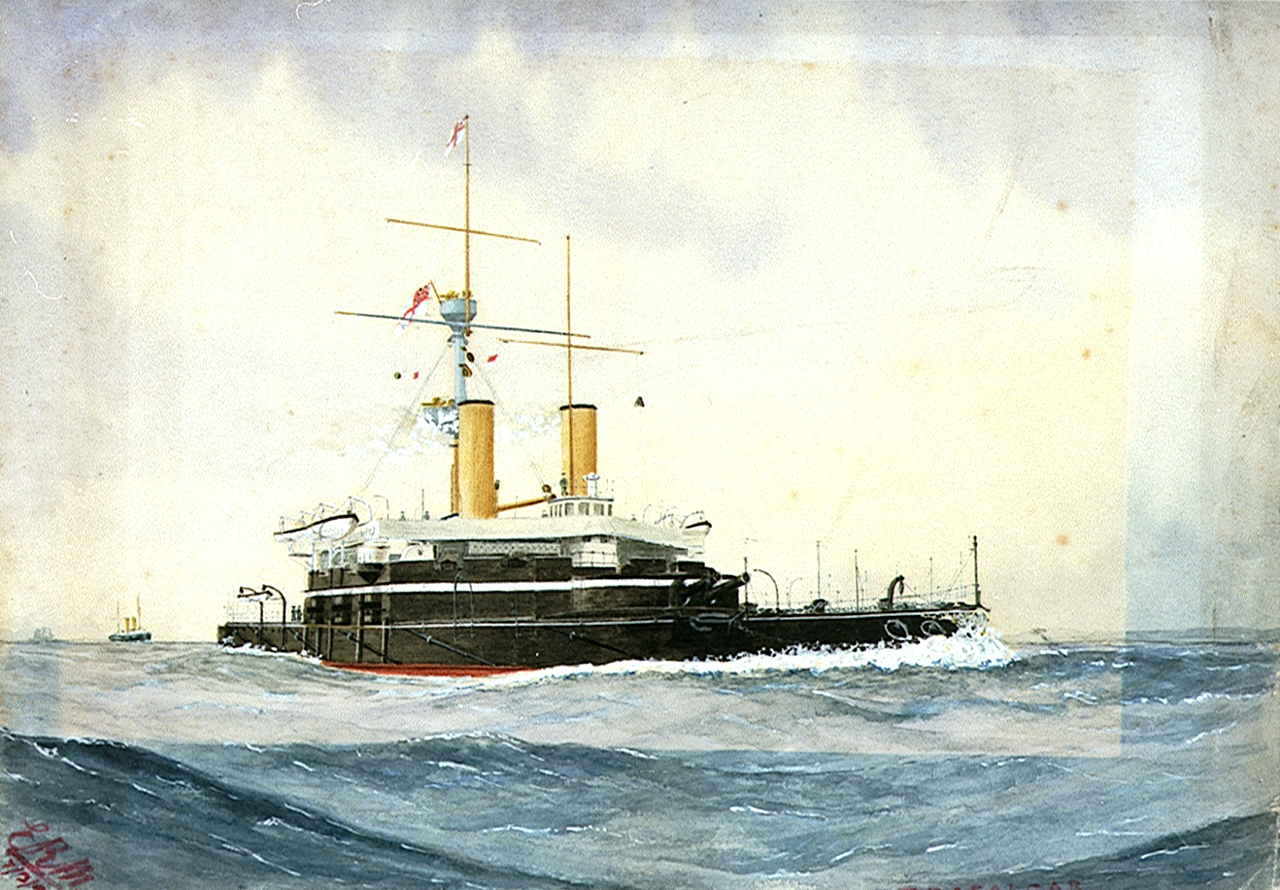
HMS Trafalgar, sometime during the 1890s

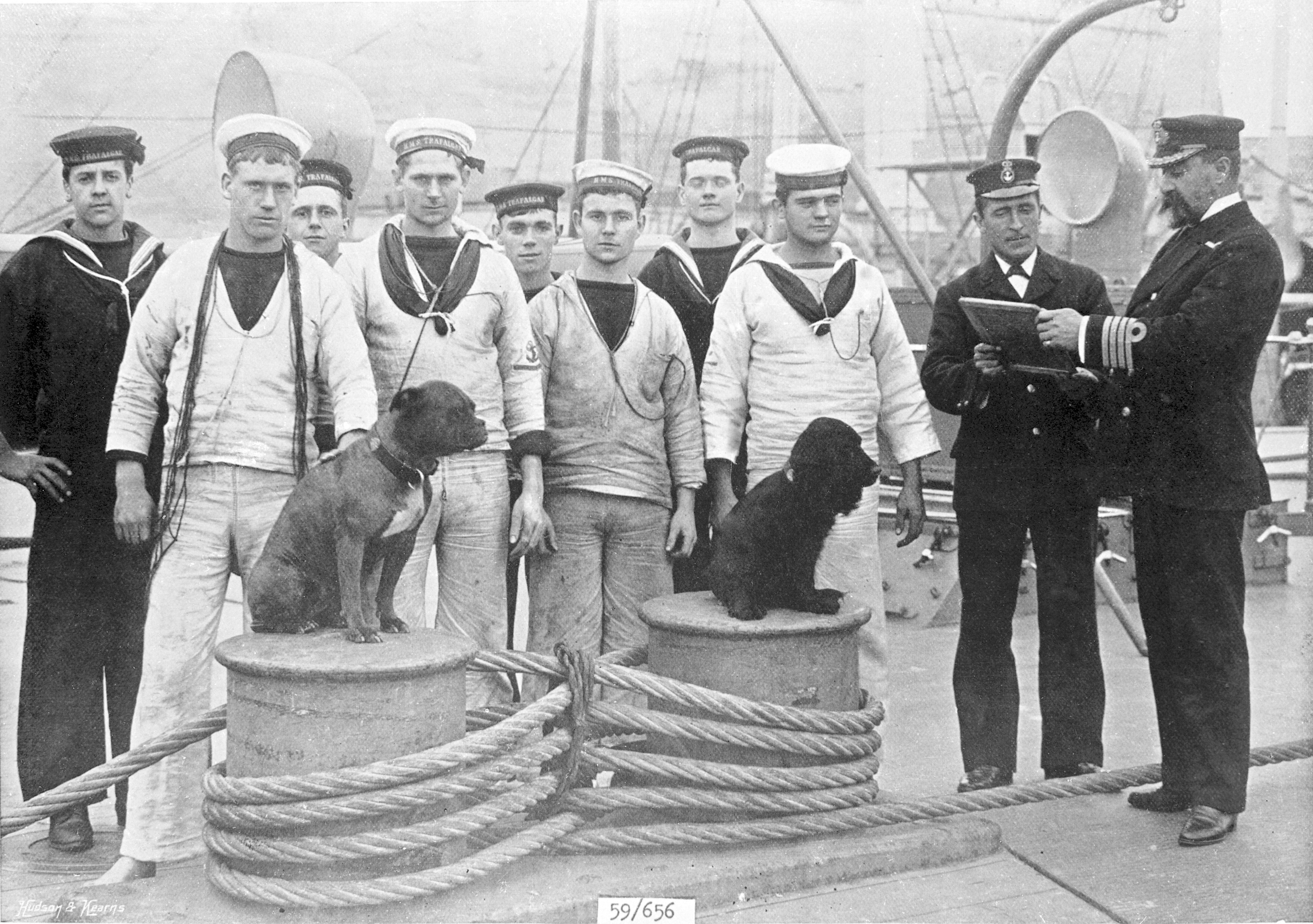
Officers, crewmen and two dogs on the quarterdeck, at Malta, 1897

Trafalgar was completed, except for her main armament, in only three years and three months. The delay in the production of her guns meant that she was not commissioned, as second flagship Mediterranean Fleet until 2 April 1890. She served in this position until October 1897, when she paid off at Portsmouth. She was recommissioned, and stayed there as guardship until August 1902, taking part in the fleet review held at Spithead on 16 August 1902 for the coronation of King Edward VII. Captain George Anson Primrose was appointed in command in December 1899.

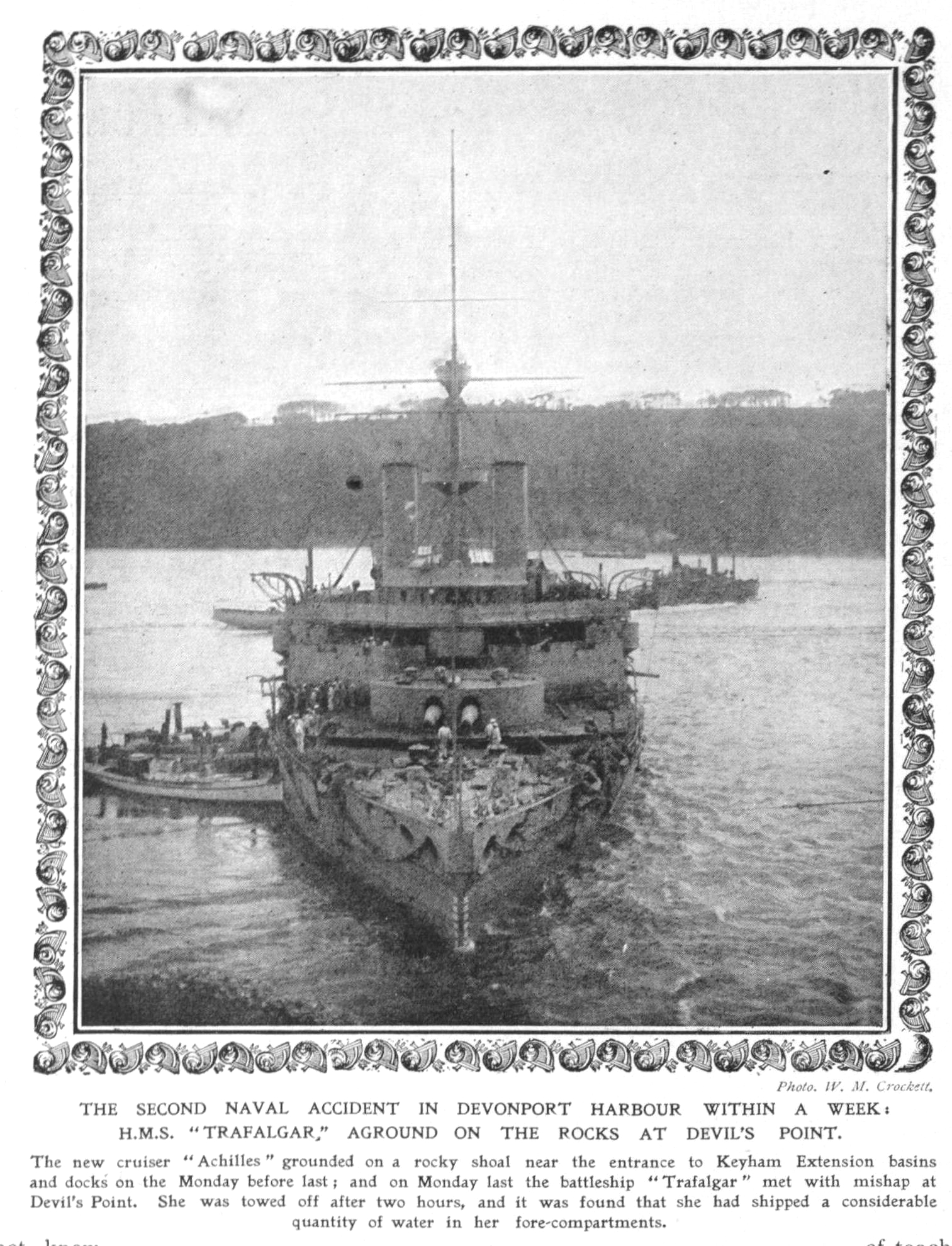
Trafalgar, aground on the rocks at Devil's Point off Devonport in 1907

She remained thereafter in reserve until 1907, when she went to Sheerness to serve as a drill ship for crews of turrets and of submerged torpedo tubes. In April 1909 she reverted to active service with the fourth division of the Home Fleet, based at the Nore. She was sold on 9 March 1911.

== Bibliography ==
- Brown, David K. (1997). Warrior to Dreadnought: Warship Development 1860–1905. Chatham Publishing. ISBN 1-86176-022-1.
- Friedman, Norman (2018). British Battleships of the Victorian Era. Naval Institute Press. ISBN 978-1-68247-329-0.
- K. McBride, Nile and Trafalgar, The Last British Ironclads, in Warship 2000–2001, Conways Maritime Press
- Parkes, Oscar (1990) [1966]. British Battleships, Warrior 1860 to Vanguard 1950: A History of Design, Construction, and Armament (New & rev. ed.). Naval Institute Press. ISBN 1-55750-075-4.
- Roberts, John (1979). "Great Britain (including Empire Forces)". In Chesneau, Roger & Kolesnik, Eugene M. (eds.). Conway's All the World's Fighting Ships 1860–1905. Mayflower Books. pp. 1–113. ISBN 0-8317-0302-4.
