= HMS Nile (1888) =

British Trafalgar-class battleship

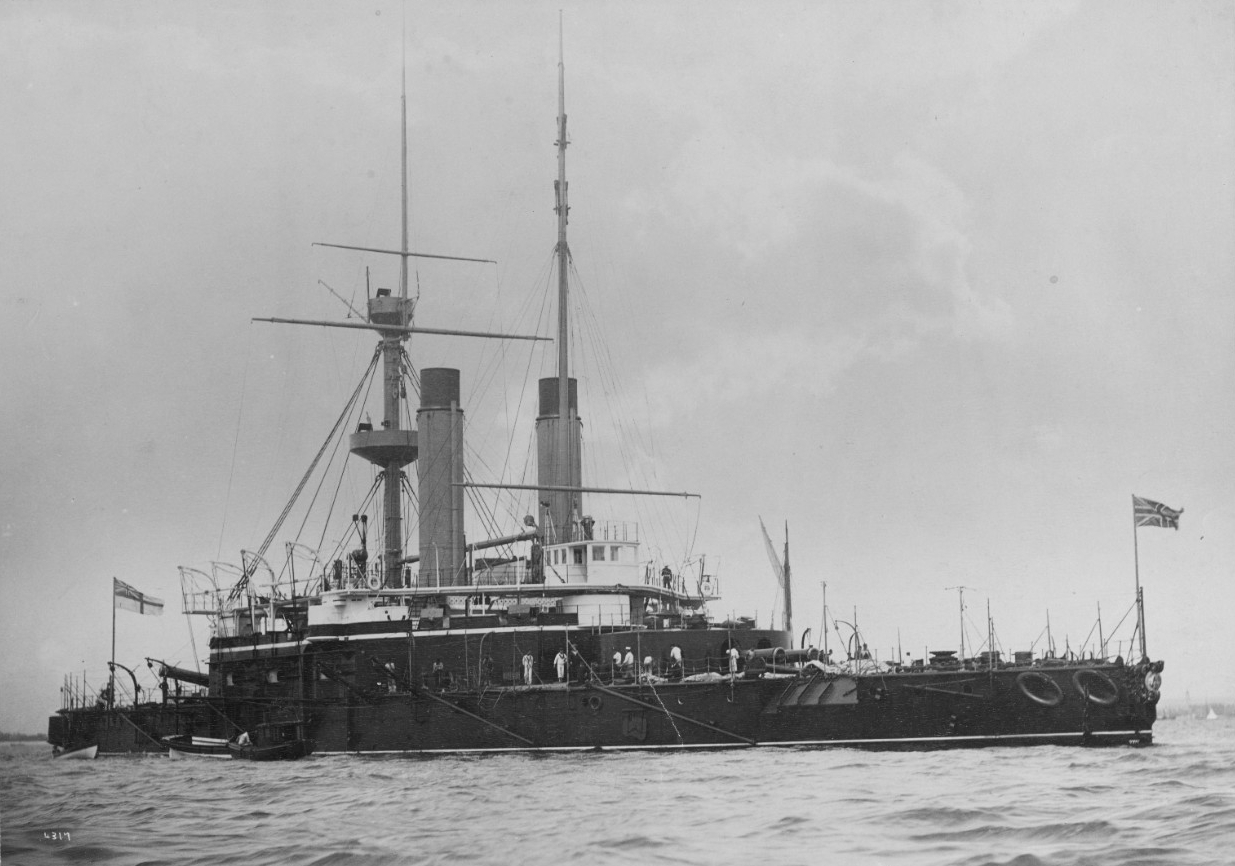
- Nile at anchor, before 1897

History

United Kingdom
- Name: HMS Nile
- Namesake: Battle of the Nile
- Builder: Pembroke Dockyard
- Laid down: 8 April 1886
- Launched: 27 March 1888
- Completed: 10 July 1891
- Commissioned: 30 June 1891
- Fate: Sold for scrap, 9 July 1912

General characteristics (as built)
- Class & type: Trafalgar-class ironclad battleship
- Displacement: 12,590 long tons (12,790 t)
- Length: 345 ft (105.2 m) (pp)
- Beam: 73 ft (22.3 m)
- Draught: 28 ft 6 in (8.7 m)
- Installed power: 12,000 ihp (8,900 kW); 6 cylindrical boilers
- Propulsion: 2 shafts; 2 Triple-expansion steam engines
- Speed: 16.5 knots (30.6 km/h; 19.0 mph)
- Range: 6,300 nmi (11,700 km; 7,200 mi) @ 10 knots (19 km/h; 12 mph)
- Complement: 537 (1903)
- Armament: 4 × BL 13.5-inch (343 mm) guns; 6 × QF 4.7 inch (120 mm) guns; 8 × QF 6-pdr 2.2 in (57 mm) Hotchkiss guns; 9 × QF 3-pdr 1.9 in (47 mm) Hotchkiss guns; 4 × 14-inch (356 mm) torpedo tubes
- Armour: Belt: 20–14 in (508–356 mm); Bulkheads: 16–14 in (406–356 mm); Armoured citadel: 16–18 in (406–457 mm); Gun turrets: 18 in (457 mm); Conning tower: 14 in (356 mm); Secondary Battery: 4–5 in (102–127 mm); Deck: 3 in (76 mm)

Service record
- Part of: Mediterranean Fleet (1891–1898); Devonport guard ship (1898–1903)

HMS Nile was one of two Trafalgar-class ironclad battleships built for the Royal Navy during the 1880s. Late deliveries of her main guns delayed her commissioning until 1891 and she spent most of the decade with the Mediterranean Fleet. Nile returned home in 1898 and became the coast guard ship at Devonport for five years before she was placed in reserve in 1903. The ship was sold for scrap in 1912 and broken up at Swansea, Wales.

== Design and description ==
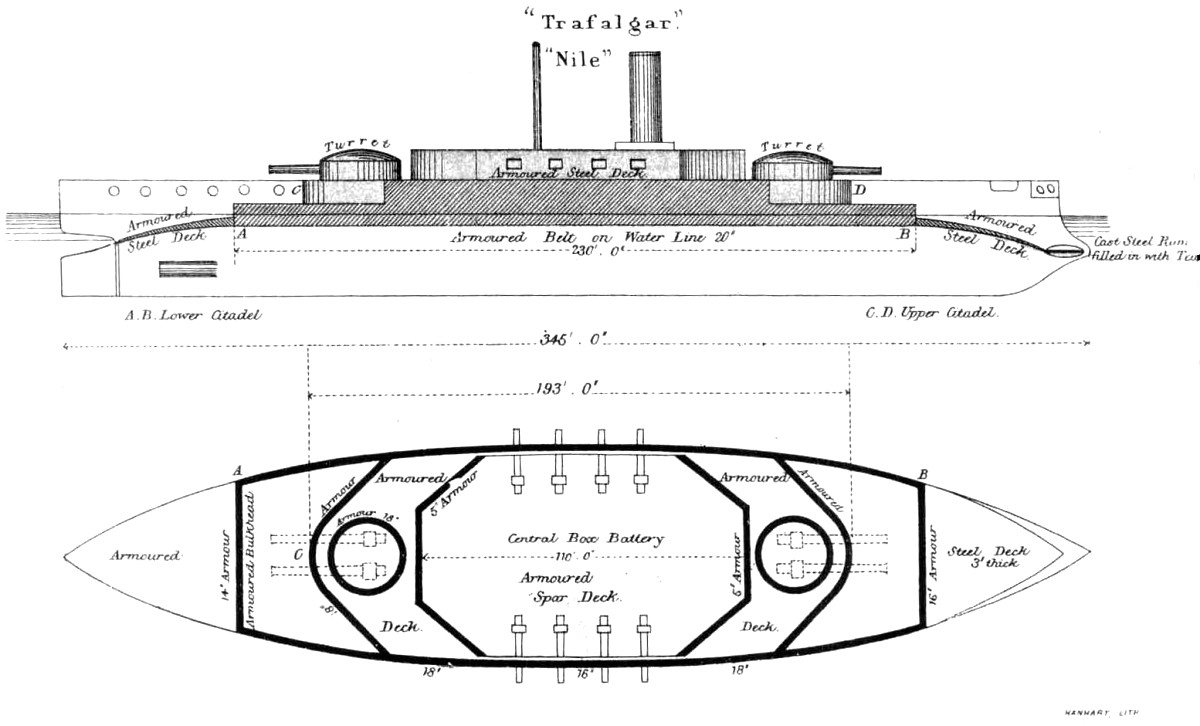
Right elevation and plan of the Trafalgar class

The design of the Trafalgar-class ships was derived from the layout of the earlier ironclad battleship Dreadnought and the Admiral class, coupled with the heavy armour of the preceding Victoria class. The Trafalgars displaced 12,590 long tons (12,790 t); the addition of more armour and ammunition during construction added an additional 650 long tons (660 t) of weight and increased their draught by a foot (0.3 m) below their designed waterline. They had a length between perpendiculars of 345 feet (105.2 m), a beam of 73 feet (22.3 m), and a draught of 28 feet 6 inches (8.7 m). Nile's crew consisted of 537 officers and ratings in 1903 and 527 two years later. The low freeboard of the Trafalgars made them very wet and they could not maintain full speed except in a calm.

The ships were powered by a pair of three-cylinder, vertical inverted, triple-expansion steam engines, each driving one shaft, which were designed to produce a total of 12,000 indicated horsepower (8,900 kW) and a maximum speed of 16.5 knots (30.6 km/h; 19.0 mph) using steam provided by six cylindrical boilers with forced draught. During her sea trials, Nile slightly exceeded this with a speed of 16.88 knots (31.26 km/h; 19.43 mph) from 12,102 ihp (9,024 kW). The Trafalgar class carried a maximum of 1,100 long tons (1,118 t) of coal which gave them a range of 6,300 nautical miles (11,700 km; 7,200 mi) at a speed of 10 knots (19 km/h; 12 mph).

=== Armament and armour ===
The Trafalgar-class ships' main armament consisted of four breech-loading (BL) 13.5-inch (343 mm) guns mounted in two twin-gun turrets, one each fore and aft of the superstructure. Each gun was provided with 80 rounds. The muzzles of these guns were only 3 feet 6 inches (1 m) above the deck, and were very hard to fight in a seaway due to the spray breaking over the forward turret.

Their secondary armament was originally planned to consist of eight BL 5-inch (127 mm) guns, but these were replaced during construction by six quick-firing (QF) 4.7-inch (120 mm) guns. 200 rounds per gun were carried by the ships. Eight QF 6-pounder 2.2 in (57 mm) and nine QF 3-pounder 1.9 in (47 mm) Hotchkiss guns were fitted for defence against torpedo boats. The ships carried four 14-inch (356 mm) torpedo tubes and another pair were added in August 1890.

The Trafalgars' armour scheme was similar to that of Dreadnought, although the waterline belt of compound armour did not cover the complete length of the ship and a 3-inch (76 mm) deck extended fore and aft of the armoured citadel to the bow and stern. The belt was 230 feet (70.1 m) long and was 20–14 inches (508–356 mm) thick; it was closed off by traverse 16–14-inch (406–356 mm) bulkheads. Above it was a strake of 18–16-inch (457–406 mm) armour that covered the bases of the gun turrets. Another strake above that protected the secondary armament and was 5–4 inches (127–102 mm) thick. The sides of the gun turrets were 18 inches thick and the conning tower was protected by 14-inch plates.

== Construction and career ==
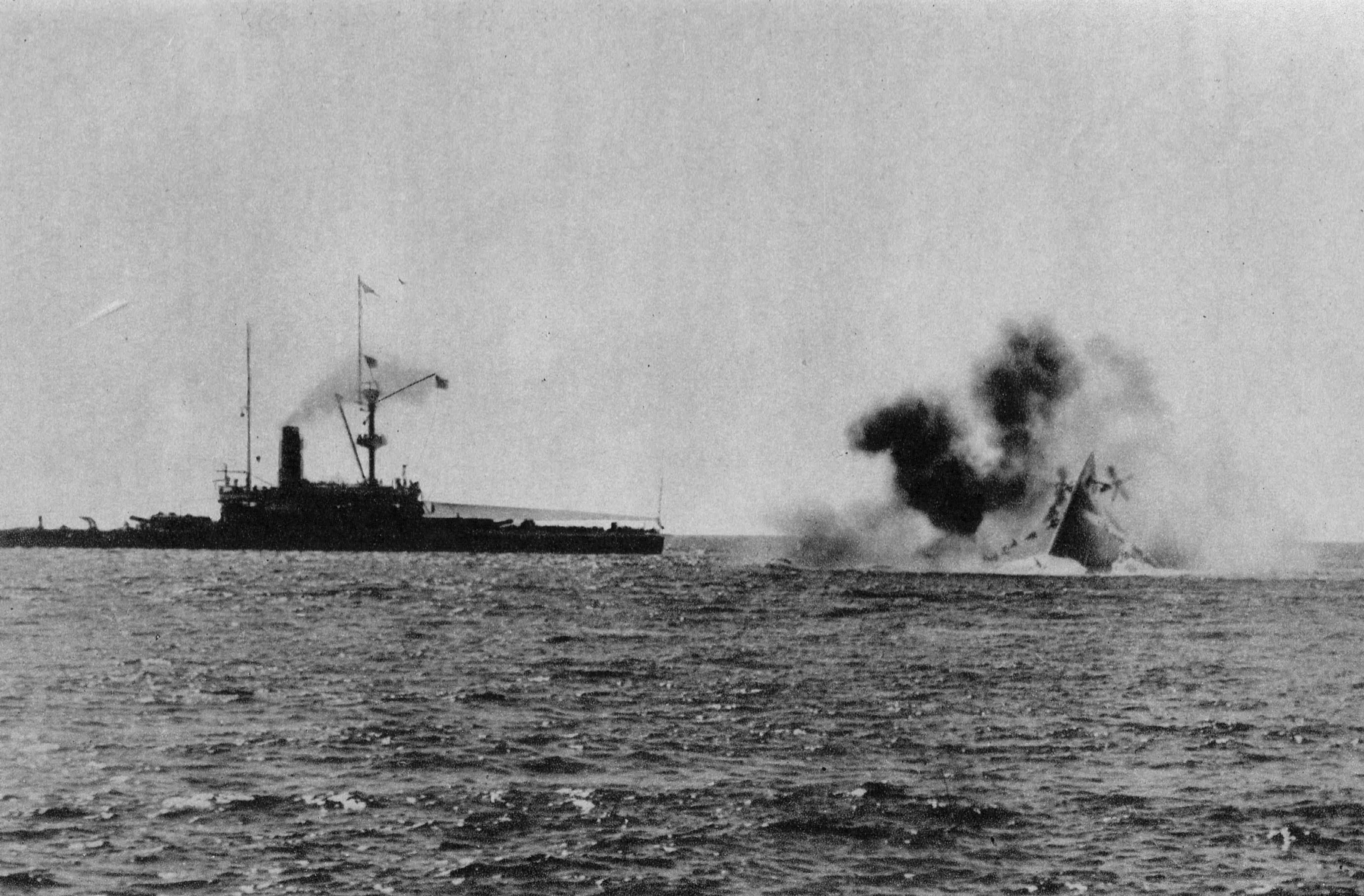
Nile standing by as the ironclad battleship Victoria sinks

Nile, named after the Battle of the Nile, was the third ship of her name to serve in the Royal Navy. She was laid down on 8 April 1886 by Pembroke Dockyard. The ship was launched on 27 March 1888 by Lady Maud Hamilton, wife of Lord George Hamilton, First Lord of the Admiralty. She was completed in July 1890, although her main guns were not delivered until the following year, at a cost of £885,718.

After delivery, she was commissioned at Portsmouth on 30 June 1891 for manoeuvres, following which she was assigned to the Mediterranean Fleet. When the battleships Victoria and Camperdown collided on 22 June 1893, Nile was next astern and it was only through the skillful manoeuvring of Captain Gerard Noel that his ship was not also involved in the collision. Nile had her 4.7-inch guns replaced by QF 6-inch (152 mm) guns in 1896. She came home in January 1898 to become the port guardship at Devonport. She took part in the fleet review held at Spithead on 16 August 1902 for the coronation of King Edward VII. She paid off at Devonport in February 1903, when her captain and crew transferred to HMS Royal Oak which took her place in the Home Fleet. The Nile was relegated to the reserve at Devonport, where she remained until she was sold on 9 July 1912 for £34,000 to be broken up at Swansea by Thos. W. Ward.

== Bibliography ==
- Beeler, John (2001). Birth of the Battleship: British Capital Ship Design 1870–1881. Naval Institute Press. ISBN 1-55750-213-7.
- Brown, David K. (1997). Warrior to Dreadnought: Warship Development 1860–1905. Chatham Publishing. ISBN 1-86176-022-1.
- Burt, R. A. (2013). British Battleships 1889–1904. Annapolis, Maryland: Naval Institute Press. ISBN 978-1-59114-065-8.
- Colledge, J. J.; Warlow, Ben (2006) [1969]. Ships of the Royal Navy: The Complete Record of All Fighting Ships of the Royal Navy from the 15th Century to the Present (3rd Rev ed.). London: Chatham Publishing. ISBN 978-1-86176-281-8. OCLC 67375475.
- Friedman, Norman (2018). British Battleships of the Victorian Era. Naval Institute Press. ISBN 978-1-68247-329-0.
- Gardiner, Robert, ed. (1992). Steam, Steel and Shellfire: The Steam Warship 1815–1905. Conway's History of the Ship. London: Conway Maritime Press. ISBN 1-55750-774-0.
- Heathcote, Tony (2002). The British Admirals of the Fleet 1734 – 1995. Barnsley, UK: Leo Cooper. ISBN 0-85052-835-6.
- Lyon, David & Winfield, Rif (2004). The Sail and Steam Navy List: All the Ships of the Royal Navy 1815–1889. Chatham Publishing. ISBN 978-1-86176-032-6. OCLC 52620555.
- Parkes, Oscar (1990) [1966]. British Battleships, Warrior 1860 to Vanguard 1950: A History of Design, Construction, and Armament (New & rev. ed.). Naval Institute Press. ISBN 1-55750-075-4.
- Phillips, Lawrie (2014). Pembroke Dockyard and the Old Navy: A Bicentennial History. Stroud, Gloucestershire, UK: The History Press. ISBN 978-0-7509-5214-9.
- Roberts, John (1979). "Great Britain (including Empire Forces)". In Chesneau, Roger & Kolesnik, Eugene M. (eds.). Conway's All the World's Fighting Ships 1860–1905. Mayflower Books. pp. 1–113. ISBN 0-8317-0302-4.
- Silverstone, Paul H. (1984). Directory of the World's Capital Ships. Hippocrene Books. ISBN 0-88254-979-0.
