= Gerard Noel (Royal Navy officer) =

Royal Navy Admiral of the Fleet (1845-1918)

Admiral of the Fleet Sir Gerard Noel GCB KCMG
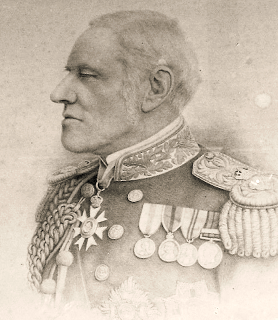
- Admiral Sir Gerard Noel
- Born: 5 March 1845; Stanhoe, Norfolk
- Died: 23 May 1918 (aged 73); Fincham, Norfolk
- Military career
- Allegiance: United Kingdom
- Branch: Royal Navy
- Service years: 1859–1915
- Rank: Admiral of the Fleet
- Commands: HMS Rover; HMS Temeraire; HMS Nile; Home Fleet; China Station; Nore Command
- Conflicts: Occupation of Crete; Cretan Revolt (1897–1898)
- Awards: Knight Grand Cross of the Order of the Bath; Knight Commander of the Order of St Michael and St George

Admiral of the Fleet Sir Gerard Henry Uctred Noel, GCB, KCMG (5 March 1845 – 23 May 1918) was a Royal Navy officer. As a junior officer he commanded a naval brigade which took part in the capture of Kumasi in February 1874 during the Second Anglo-Ashanti War.

Noel went on to be Second-in-Command of the Mediterranean Fleet: during this tour, following the murder of the British vice-consul in Heraklion and an attack on the Customs House there, Noel landed a force in Crete to court-martial the terrorists and generally restore order. After that he became Admiral Superintendent of Naval Reserves and was given the additional responsibility of Commander-in-Chief, Home Fleet. He then became Commander-in-Chief, China Station: at the time relations between the United Kingdom and Russia were strained as the United Kingdom expressed its considerable dissatisfaction in relation to Russian aggression at the start of the Russo-Japanese War. His last appointment was as Commander-in-Chief, The Nore.

== Early career ==
Born the son of the Reverend Augustus William Noel and Lucy Noel (née Tonge), Noel was educated at All Saints' School, Bloxham. He joined the Royal Navy as a cadet in the training ship HMS Illustrious at Portsmouth on 1 December 1858. He was appointed a midshipman in the second-rate HMS Hannibal in the Mediterranean Fleet in 1859 and transferred to the frigate HMS Shannon on the North America and West Indies Station in 1862. Promoted to sub-lieutenant on 7 March 1864, he transferred to the paddle sloop HMS Basilisk on the China Station in January 1865 and, having been promoted to lieutenant on 21 April 1866, he transferred again to the sloop HMS Rattler which was wrecked in September 1868. He attended the gunnery school HMS Excellent in 1870 and then became gunnery officer in the armoured ship HMS Minotaur, flagship of the Commander-in-Chief, Channel Squadron, in February 1871. He joined the corvette HMS Active on the West Coast of Africa Station in late 1873 and commanded a naval brigade which took part in the capture of Kumasi in February 1874 during the Second Anglo-Ashanti War.

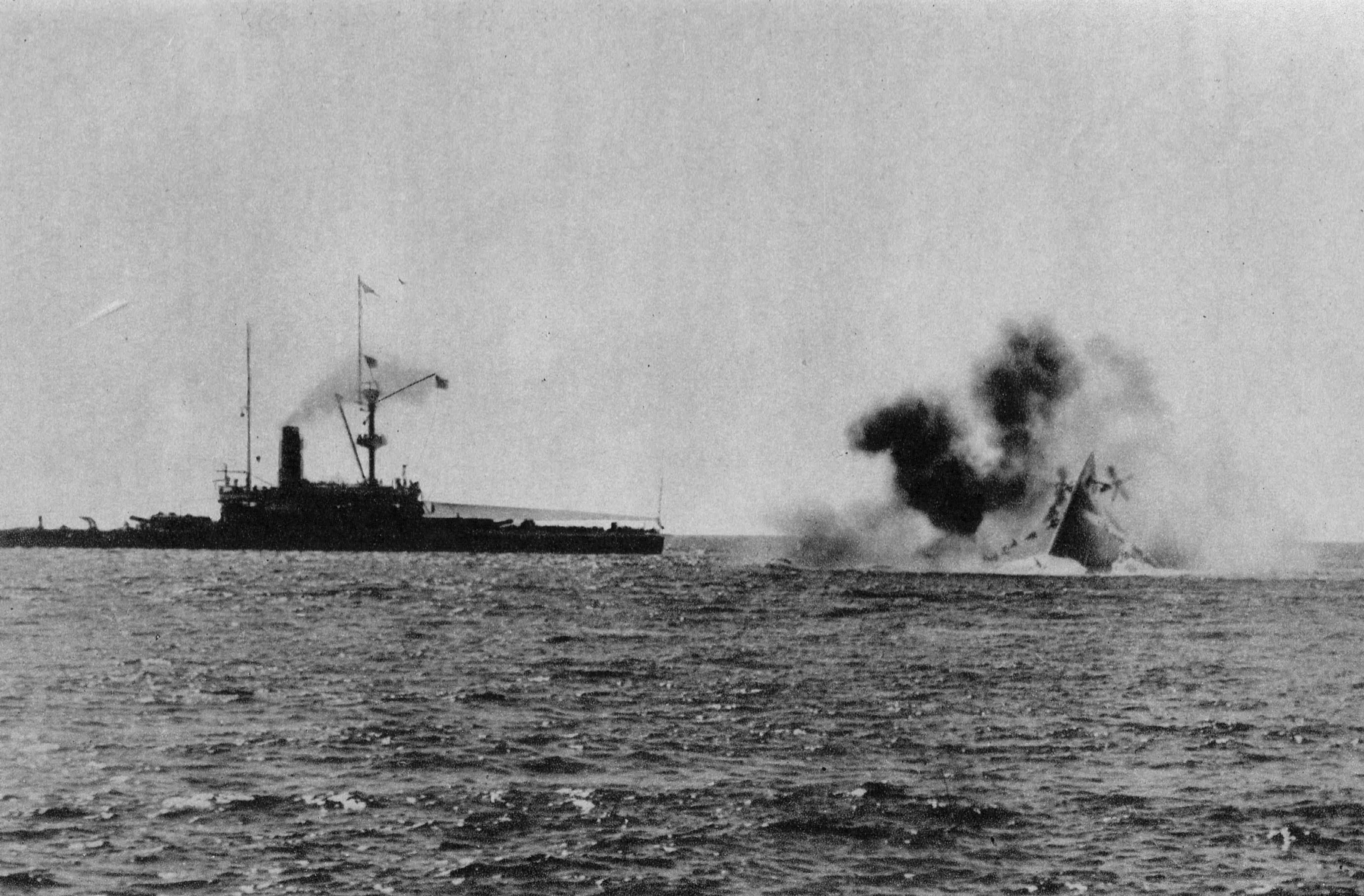
HMS Victoria sinking after the dreadful accident of June 1893. HMS Nile, shown on the left and sailing under Noel's command, was next astern and just avoided the collision

Promoted to commander on 31 March 1874, Noel became executive officer in the frigate HMS Immortalité at Portsmouth in 1874 and, having been awarded the gold medal of the Royal United Services Institute for his work on naval tactics in 1875, he became executive officer aboard the Royal Yacht HMY Victoria and Albert, also based at Portsmouth, in 1878. Promoted to captain on 11 January 1881, he became commanding officer of the corvette HMS Rover in the Training Squadron in September 1885, commanding officer of the battleship HMS Temeraire in the Mediterranean Fleet in October 1889 and commanding officer of the battleship HMS Nile in the Mediterranean Fleet in June 1891. In the dreadful accident of June 1893, when the battleships HMS Victoria and HMS Camperdown collided, HMS Nile was next astern and it was only through the skilful manoeuvring of Noel that his ship was not also involved in the collision.

== Senior Command ==
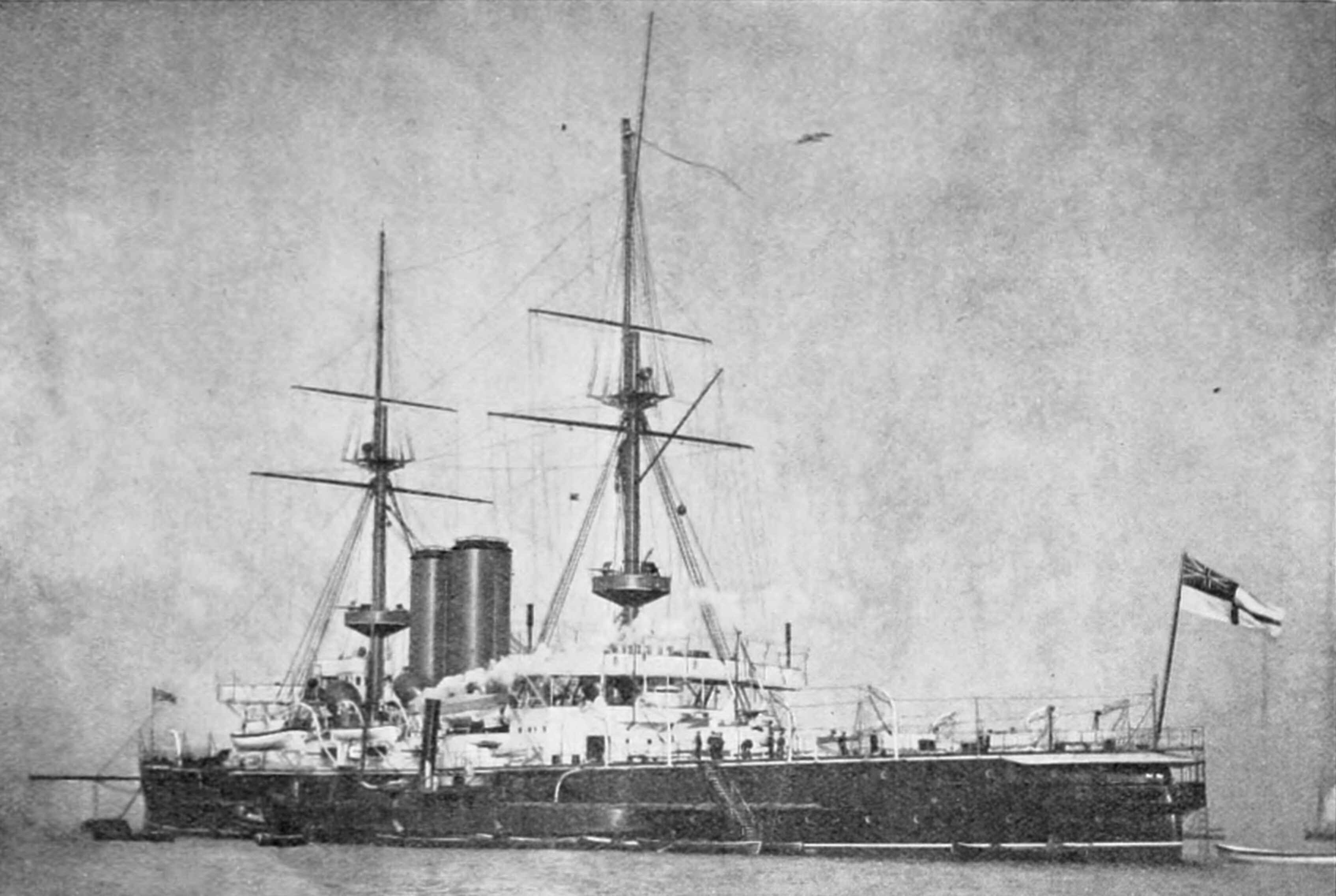
The battleship HMS Glory, Noel's flagship as Commander-in-Chief, China Station

Noel became Junior Naval Lord at the Admiralty in November 1893 and was appointed a naval aide-de-camp to the Queen on 1 January 1894. Promoted to rear admiral on 8 May 1896, he became Second-in-Command of the Mediterranean Fleet, with his flag in the battleship HMS Revenge, in January 1898. During this tour, following the murder of the British vice-consul in Heraklion and an attack on the Customs House there, Noel landed a force in Crete in September 1898 to court-martial the terrorists and generally restore order. He completed this task successfully and was appointed a Knight Commander of the Order of St Michael and St George (KCMG) on 25 November 1898. He visited Rome in March 1900.

Noel became Admiral Superintendent of Naval Reserves in May 1900, and hoisted his flag on board the battleship HMS Alexandra. In April the following year he transferred to HMS Revenge, and on 5 November 1901 he was promoted to vice admiral. He was appointed a Knight Commander of the Order of the Bath (KCB) in the 1902 Coronation Honours on 26 June 1902, and received the insignia in an investiture on board the royal yacht Victoria and Albert outside Cowes on 15 August 1902, the day before the fleet review held there to mark the coronation. Noel took part in the review with the Revenge.

He was given the additional responsibility of Commander-in-Chief, Home Fleet, with his flag again in the battleship HMS Alexandra, in December 1902. He went on to be Commander-in-Chief, China Station, with his flag in the battleship HMS Glory, in January 1904. At the time relations between the United Kingdom and Russia were strained as the United Kingdom expressed its considerable dissatisfaction in relation to Russian aggression at the start of the Russo-Japanese War. He was promoted to full admiral on 24 May 1905.

Noel became Commander-in-Chief, The Nore in January 1907, was promoted to Admiral of the Fleet on 2 December 1908 and was advanced to Knight Grand Cross of the Order of the Bath (GCB) on 1 January 1913. He was not employed during the First World War and retired from the Navy in March 1915. He died at Fincham in Norfolk on 23 May 1918 and was buried in the churchyard of St Martin's Church at Fincham two days later.

== Family ==
In 1875 Noel married Charlotte Rachel Frederica Cresswell; they went on to have two daughters and one son.

== Sources ==
- Heathcote, Tony (2002). The British Admirals of the Fleet 1734 – 1995. Pen & Sword Ltd. ISBN 0-85052-835-6.

Military offices
Preceded by Lord Walter Kerr	Junior Naval Lord; 1893–1898	Succeeded by Sir Arthur Moore
Preceded by New Post	Commander-in-Chief, Home Fleet; 1902–1903	Succeeded by Sir Arthur Wilson
Preceded by Sir Cyprian Bridge	Commander-in-Chief, China Station; 1904–1906	Succeeded by Sir Arthur Moore
Preceded by Sir Hugo Pearson	Commander-in-Chief, The Nore; 1907–1908	Succeeded by Sir Charles Drury
