= Trafalgar-class ironclad =

British warship class (1890–1911)

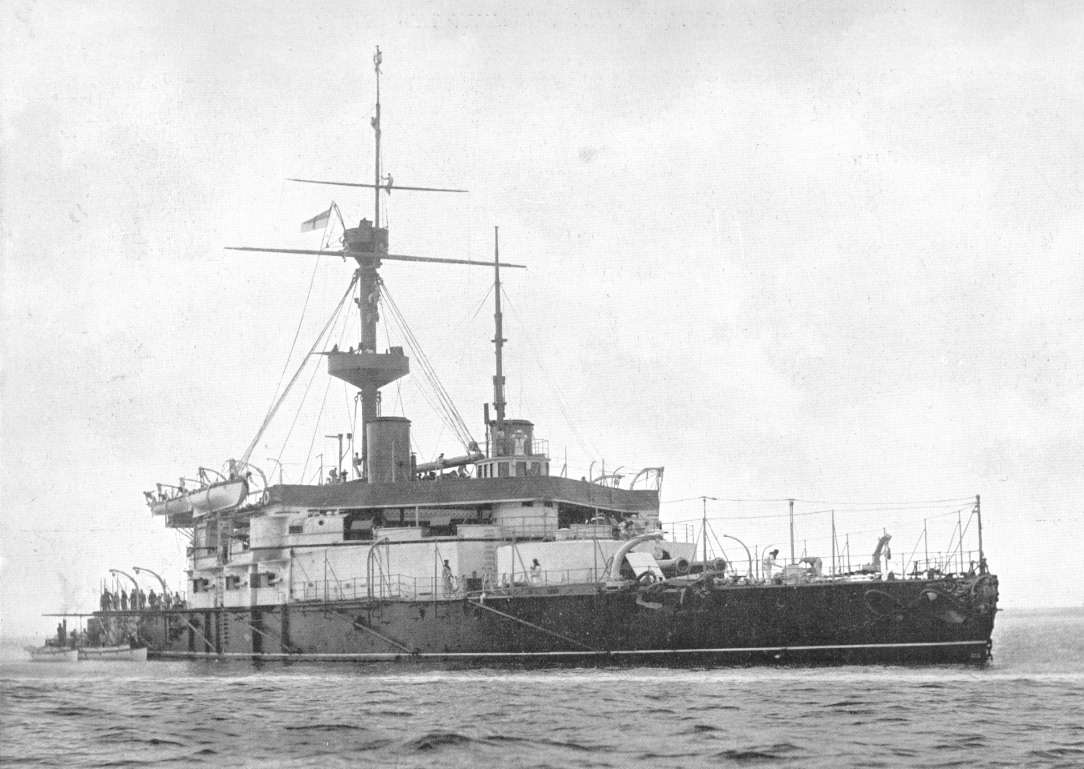
- HMS Trafalgar

Class overview
- Operators: Royal Navy
- Preceded by: Victoria class
- Succeeded by: Royal Sovereign class
- In commission: 1890–1911
- Completed: 2
- Retired: 2

General characteristics
- Type: Ironclad battleship
- Displacement: 11,940 tons (designed); 12,590 tons (actual)
- Length: 345 ft (105 m)
- Beam: 73 ft (22 m)
- Draught: 27 ft 6 in (8.38 m)
- Propulsion: 2 × coal-fired 3-cylinder steam engines, 6 cylindrical boilers, twin screws
- Speed: 16.7 knots (30.9 km/h; 19.2 mph)
- Complement: 577
- Armament: 4 × BL 13.5-inch (342.9 mm) guns; 6 × 4.7 inch (120 mm) QF guns; 8 × 6-pounder guns; 9 × 3-pounder QF guns; 5 × torpedo tubes
- Armour: Belt: 20 in (508 mm) amidships, 14 in (356 mm) at ends; Forward Bulkheads: 16 in (406 mm); After bulkhead: 14 in (356 mm); Citadel: 16–18 in (406–457 mm); Turrets: 18 in (457 mm); Conning Tower: 14 in (356 mm); Battery bulkheads: 4–5 in (102–127 mm); Deck: 3 in (76 mm)

The two Trafalgar-class battleships of the British Royal Navy were late-nineteenth-century ironclad warships. Both were named after naval battles won by the British during the Napoleonic Wars under the command of Admiral Nelson. The two ships were named HMS Nile and HMS Trafalgar.

== Design ==
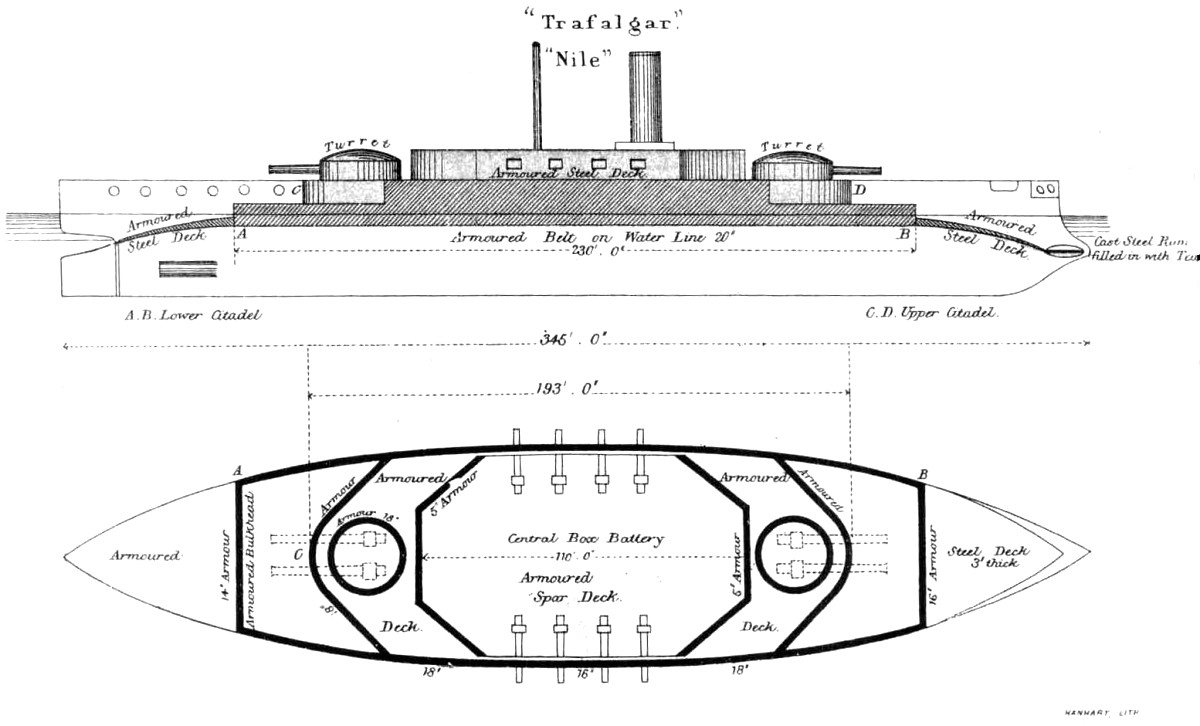
Starboard elevation and deck plan, according to Brassey's annual 1888–9, showing the original planned secondary armament of eight 5-inch guns

Laid down in 1886, they were designed by William Henry White to be improved versions of the Admiral class, having a greater displacement to allow for improved protection. However they sacrificed a full armoured belt for greater thickness amidships in a partial belt.

They were originally intended to have a secondary armament of eight 5 inch guns but this was changed to six quick-firing 4.7 inch guns for use against attacking torpedo boats, which led to a weight increase of 60 tons, partly due to the increased amount of ammunition carried. This was one of the changes which led to the vessels being 600 tons overweight, causing an increase in draught of a foot.

The Trafalgars were the penultimate low-freeboard battleships built for the Royal Navy. This design had been favoured for several years because it reduced the size of the target that the ships presented to enemy guns in battle, and because the smaller hull area allowed thicker armour. However, as a consequence of having a freeboard of only about 15 feet, the vessels were unable to cope with very rough seas. This was mitigated by having them spend most of their active service in the relatively calm Mediterranean.

When they were built, many observers overestimated the vulnerability of large ships to torpedoes and the perceived inability to avoid them, which made them believe that large warships would inevitably be replaced by smaller, less vulnerable, and less valuable, vessels. For example, John Hibbert, the parliamentary secretary of the Admiralty, told Parliament in March 1886: "I think I may safely say that these two large iron-clads will probably be the last iron-clads of this type that will ever be built in this or any other country. In France they are ceasing to go on with the construction of large iron-clads."

== Ships ==
Name	Builder	Laid down	Launched	Completed
Trafalgar	Portsmouth Dockyard	18 January 1886	20 September 1887	1890
Nile	Pembroke Dockyard	8 April 1886	27 March 1888	10 July 1891

== Bibliography ==
- Archibald, E.H.H. (1971). The Metal Fighting Ship in the Royal Navy 1860–1970. Arco Publishing Co. ISBN 0-668-02509-3.
- Beeler, John (2001). Birth of the Battleship: British Capital Ship Design 1870-1881. Naval Institute Press. ISBN 1-55750-213-7.
- Brown, David K. (1997). Warrior to Dreadnought: Warship Development 1860–1905. Chatham Publishing. ISBN 1-86176-022-1.
- Friedman, Norman (2018). British Battleships of the Victorian Era. Naval Institute Press. ISBN 978-1-68247-329-0.
- K. McBride, Nile and Trafalgar, The Last British Ironclads, Warship 2000–2001, Conways Maritime Press
- Parkes, Oscar (1990) [1966]. British Battleships, Warrior 1860 to Vanguard 1950: A History of Design, Construction, and Armament (New & rev. ed.). Naval Institute Press. ISBN 1-55750-075-4.
- Roberts, John (1979). "Great Britain (including Empire Forces)". In Chesneau, Roger & Kolesnik, Eugene M. (eds.). Conway's All the World's Fighting Ships 1860–1905. Mayflower Books. pp. 1–113. ISBN 0-8317-0302-4.
