= BL 13.5-inch Mk I – IV naval gun =

Ordnance BL 13.5 inch gun Mk I - IV
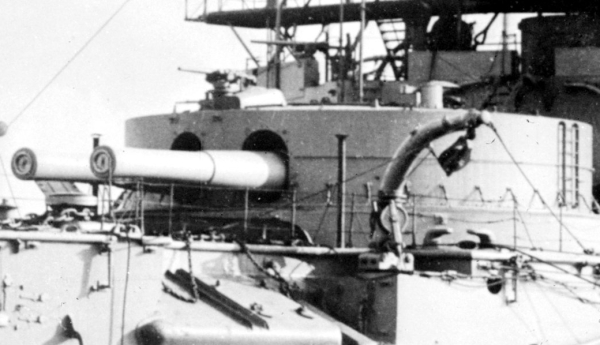
- The forward 13.5-inch (343-mm) gun turret of the battleship HMS Hood
- Type: Naval gun
- Place of origin: United Kingdom

Service history
- Used by: United Kingdom; Kingdom of Italy

Production history
- Designer: Woolwich
- Designed: 1880
- Variants: Mk I, II, III, IV

Specifications
- Mass: 67-69 tons barrel & breech
- Barrel length: 405 inches (10.29 m) bore (30 calibres)
- Shell: 1,250 pounds (570 kg)
- Calibre: 13.5-inch (342.9 mm)
- Muzzle velocity: 2,016 feet per second (614 m/s)
- Effective firing range: 12,000 yards (11,000 m)

The BL 13.5 inch naval gun Mk I ("67-ton gun") was Britain's first successful large breechloading naval gun, initially designed in the early 1880s and eventually deployed in the late 1880s. Mks I - IV (Note: Mk I = Mark 1, Mk II = Mark 2, Mk III = Mark 3, Mk IV = Mk 4. Britain used Roman numerals to denote marks (models) of ordnance until after World War II. Hence this article covers the first four models of British 13.5 inch guns) were all of 30 calibres length and of similar construction and performance.

== United Kingdom service ==
=== Royal Navy service ===
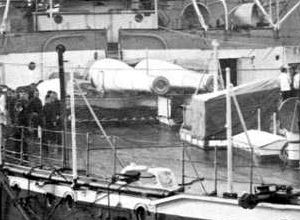
Aft barbette mounting on battleship HMS Empress of India in drydock at Chatham Dockyard in the 1890s

The gun was designed to match the new large guns of the French Amiral Baudin-class battleships. Development and manufacture occurred far slower than intended. The first ships armed with the 13.5 in gun were four of the Admiral-class battleships: Anson, Camperdown, Howe and Rodney, which were laid down in 1882-83 and completed in 1888-89. The Howe and the Rodney were laid down to the same dimensions as the preceding Collingwood, which was designed for 12 in 45 ton guns. The increase in weight of the 13.5 in guns, their mountings and ammunition increased draught from 26 feet 4 1/2 inches (8.039 m) to 27 feet 10 inches (8.48 m), and increased displacement by 800 long tons (810 t). The Anson and Camperdown were laid down later, to greater dimensions. All four ships carried their 13.5 in guns in twin barbettes on the centreline at each end of the superstructure.

The guns also equipped the subsequent Trafalgar class laid down in 1886 and Royal Sovereign-class battleships laid down in 1889.

=== Coast defence service ===
A single Mk III gun was mounted as a disappearing gun for coast defence at Penlee Battery, Plymouth.

== Italian service ==
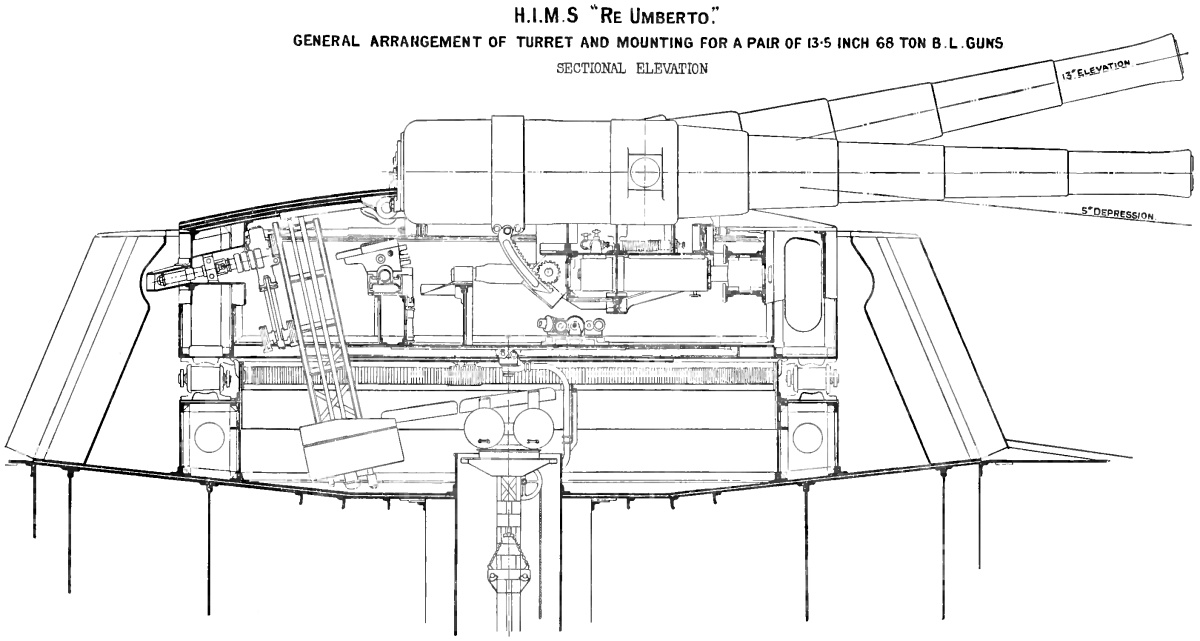
Barbette mounting on Re Umberto

Guns were also sold to Italy to arm the Re Umberto-class ironclads Re Umberto, Sicilia, and Sardegna, laid down in 1884 and finally commissioned in 1893 and 1895.

== Construction ==
The gun was made up of the following parts:

- A tube,
- Breech-piece,
- B hoop,
- B tube,
- 1- and 2-C hoops,
- C tube,
- 1- and 2D hoops, and
- Jacket.

Construction was as follows:

1. The breech-piece, B hoop and B tube were shrunk over the A tube, extending to the muzzle.
2. The 1-C hoop was shrunk over the breech-piece. The 1-C hoop and the breech-piece were connected longitudinally by a screwed steel bush at the breech end. The bush was prepared for receiving the breech screw.
3. The C tube and 2-C hoop were shrunk over the B hoop and B tube.
4. The 1-D hoop was shrunk round the 1-C hoop and part of the C tube. This was secured at the breech end by a screwed steel ring.
5. The 2-D hoop was shrunk over the C tube immediately in front of the 1 D hoop.
6. The jacket was shrunk round the 1-D hoop at the breech.
7. Thrust collars were formed on the outside of the 1-D hoop and were used to secure the gun to the gun-mounting (the gun did not have trunnions).

The length of the bore was 405 inches (10.3 m) (30 calibres), of which the length of rifling was 333.4 inches (8.47 m). The rifling used the increasing twist system; there were 54 grooves, with a twist of 1 in 120 at the breech-end rising to 1 in 30 at 166.7 inches (4.23 m) from the muzzle; the twist then remained a uniform 1 in 30. The chamber length was 66.5 inches (1.69 m), and the volume of the chamber was 17,100 cubic inches (0.280 m^{3}). The gun had a hydraulically-operated interrupted-screw breech-block. The breech-block was completely detached from the gun during loading (because there was no carrier).

The guns were designed and manufactured by Woolwich Arsenal. There were significant delays in the manufacture of the guns in the 1880s, which inordinately delayed the completion of the first four battleships equipped with them. The cause of the delays was "the faulty principle of placing liners in the bores which cracked during proof and it took a long time to repair these and make the guns efficient."

== Operating characteristics ==
The gun fired a 1,250-pound (570 kg) projectile using 630 pounds (290 kg) brown powder (SBC) propellant. This gave the projectile a muzzle velocity of 2,016 feet per second (614 m/s), which would penetrate 28.2 inches (720 mm) wrought iron at 1,000 yards (0.91 km). When smokeless propellant was introduced, the gun had a 187 pounds (85 kg) cordite-44 charge, giving the 1,250 lb projectile a muzzle velocity of 2,099 feet per second (640 m/s). The calibre radius head (crh) of the projectiles was nominally two.

In the Admiral and Trafalgar classes the maximum elevation was 13 degrees. In the Royal Sovereign class and the Hood the maximum elevation was 13.5 degrees. At 13.5 degrees elevation, the maximum range with brown powder was 11,950 yards (10.93 km), whilst with cordite it was 12,620 yards (11.54 km).

The projectiles used a copper driving band to engage the rifling. Once a gun had fired about 100-110 rounds with full (brown powder) charges, the rifling became worn near the breech, such that it was necessary to augment the width of the driving bands. Ships were therefore issued with "augmenting strips", which were long strips of copper that were hammered partially into the recessed ring around the projectile (cannelure) that held the driving band. Once guns were too worn for augmenting strips to help, the guns were sent back to the factory to be relined. Wear was lower when firing reduced charges.

Under favourable circumstances, two 13.5 in guns in a mounting on the Anson could fire "in a couple of minutes or even less".

== See also ==
- List of naval guns

=== Weapons of comparable role, performance and era ===
- 340mm/28 Modèle 1881 gun French equivalent

== Bibliography ==
- Text Book of Gunnery, 1902. London: Printed for His Majesty's Stationery Office, by Harrison and Sons, St. Martin's Lane
- Naval Gunnery, by Captain H Garbett RN, pub George Bell & sons, 1897.
- British Battleships, by Oscar Parkes, first published Seeley Service & Co, 1957, published United States Naval Institute Press, 1990. ISBN 1-55750-075-4
