= List of pre-dreadnought battleships of the Royal Navy =

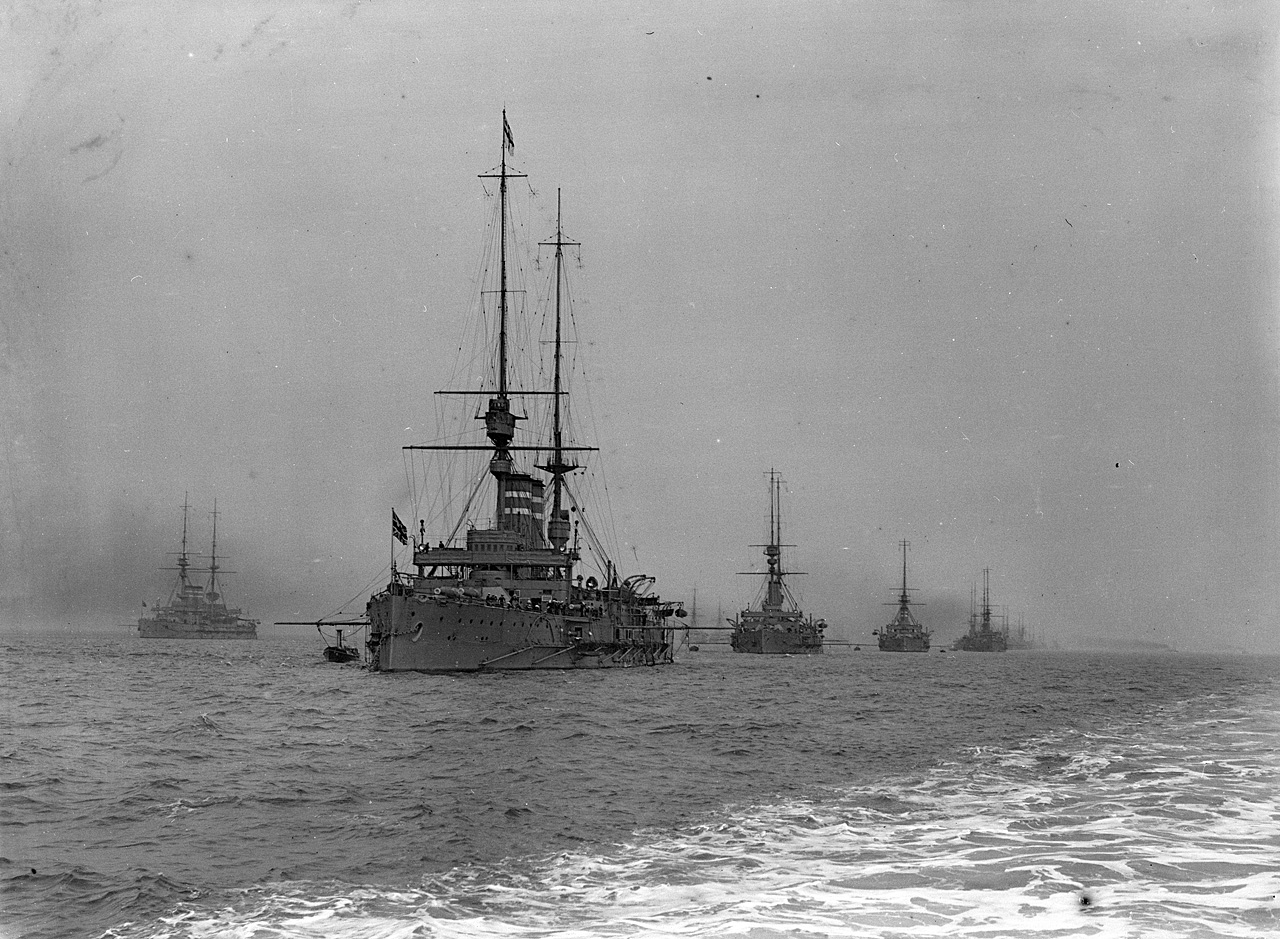
A column of pre-dreadnought battleships at anchor during the King's Review of the Fleet at Spithead, 1909

The British Royal Navy built a series of pre-dreadnought battleships as part of a naval expansion programme that began with the Naval Defence Act 1889. These ships were characterised by a main battery of four heavy guns—typically 12-inch (305 mm) guns—in two twin mounts, a secondary armament that usually comprised 4.7-to-6-inch (120 to 150 mm) guns, and a high freeboard. (Note: The "pre-dreadnought battleship" is typically said to have originated with the Royal Sovereign class, which was a development of earlier turret ships like the Trafalgar class. The Royal Sovereigns adopted the same centerline arrangement of the main battery, but added another deck, which increased freeboard, significantly improving their seakeeping. The success of the Royal Sovereign class marked the end of a period of experimentation in capital ship design, as subsequent British battleships followed the same pattern and most foreign navies followed suit.) Primarily concerned with maintaining its "two-power standard" of numerical superiority over the combined French and Russian fleets, the Royal Navy built or purchased a total of fifty-two battleships of this type prior to the 1906 completion of the revolutionary all-big-gun Dreadnought, which gave the pre-dreadnoughts their name. William Henry White served as the Director of Naval Construction from 1885 to 1902 and thus oversaw the development of most of the pre-dreadnoughts.

The first class, the Royal Sovereign class, comprised eight ships and introduced the standard armament layout associated with pre-dreadnought type battleships. They were followed by a trio of smaller, second-class battleships intended for overseas duties: the two Centurion-class battleships and HMS Renown. The nine Majestic-class battleships followed as refinements of White's original design, and they proved to be widely influential as foreign navies copied their general characteristics. Six slightly smaller Canopus-class battleships intended for the China Station followed, after which White designed another tranche of eight larger battleships: three Formidable- and five very similar London-class ships. The latter were built as a stopgap while White completed work on the faster Duncan class, which were intended to counter new Russian ships. A trend toward larger secondary batteries in foreign battleships led to the eight-ship King Edward VII class, which carried 9.2 in (234 mm) guns. A pair of small battleships originally built for the Chilean Navy—what became the Swiftsure class—were purchased after the Chileans placed them for sale in 1903. A final class of two ships, designed by Philip Watts, was built while Dreadnought was being developed: the Lord Nelson class.

The ships built for the Royal Navy served in a variety of roles across the globe, seeing service in the Mediterranean, Home, and Atlantic Fleets, among others. The second-class ships generally operated abroad on the China Station or elsewhere in the British Empire. As newer ships came into service, older vessels were placed in reserve or converted for subsidiary duties, including serving as barracks ships and depot vessels. One vessel, Montagu, was lost in an accidental grounding in 1906 and the oldest battleships of the Royal Sovereign and Centurion classes were broken up beginning in the early 1910s. With the start of the First World War in 1914, many of the vessels were mobilised for combat, and many served in the Dardanelles campaign, where five were lost to torpedoes and mines. Another five were sunk elsewhere during the war. The surviving vessels were all broken up in the post-war reduction in naval strength save one, Agamemnon, which was converted into a radio-controlled target ship. She served in this role until 1927, when she was sold for scrap.

Key
Armament	The number and type of the primary armament
Armour	The maximum thickness of the armoured belt
Displacement	Ship displacement at full load
Propulsion	Number of shafts, type of propulsion system, and top speed generated
Service	The dates work began and finished on the ship and its ultimate fate
Laid down	The date the keel assembly commenced
Commissioned	The date the ship was commissioned

== Royal Sovereign class ==
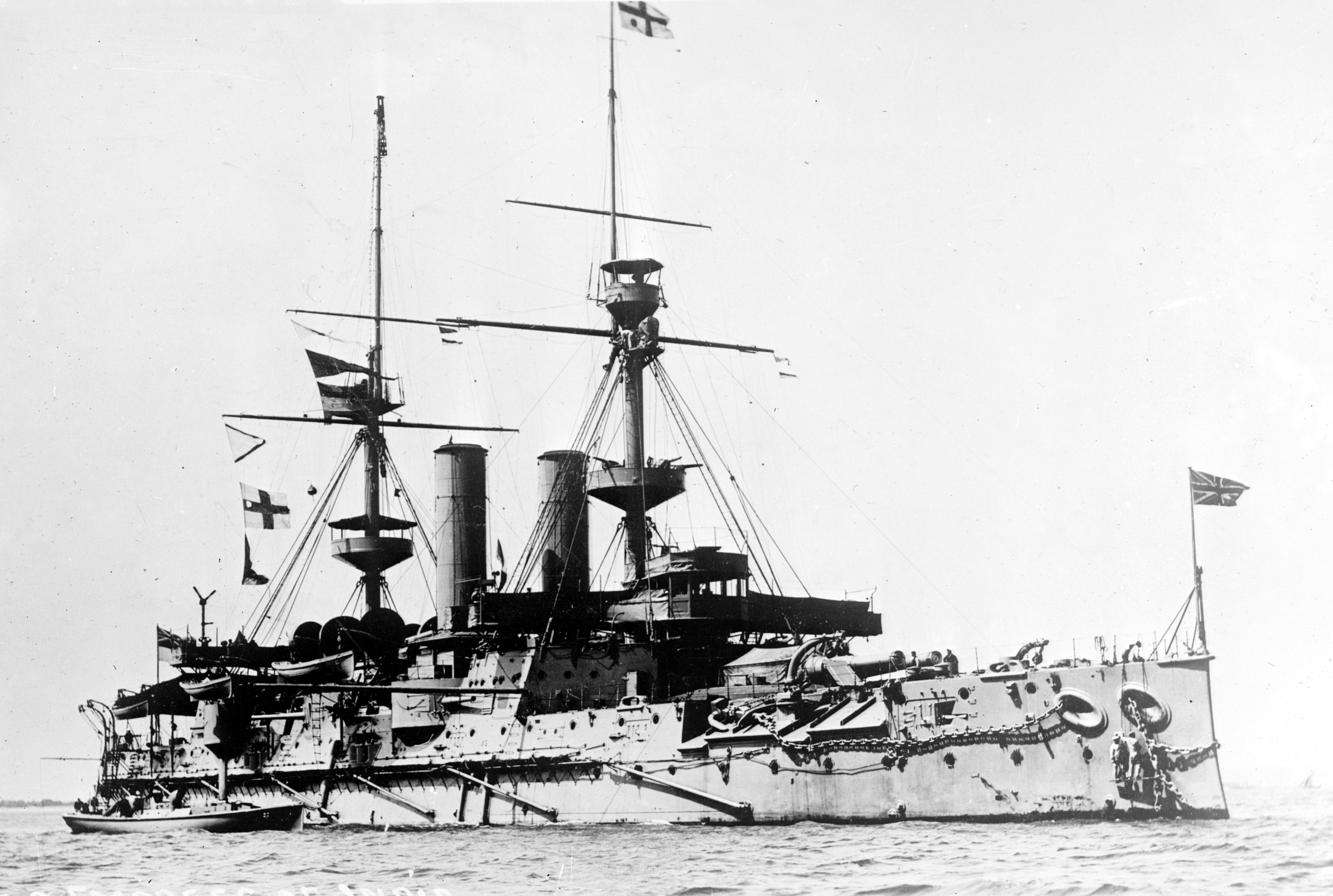
HMS Empress of India in 1906

The Royal Sovereign class was authorised under the Naval Defence Act 1889, which established the "two-power standard" and led to a major naval construction programme. They were ordered in response to a war scare with the Russian Empire and a realisation that the fleet would be insufficient in the event of a conflict with France. The class is frequently regarded as the first of what would later become known as the pre-dreadnought battleship, as they marked a clear departure from the period of design experimentation that characterised ironclad battleship construction in the 1870s and 1880s. They introduced what became the standard form for battleships for the next fifteen years, which included a main battery of four heavy guns in a pair of two-gun mounts and a high freeboard suitable for operation on the high seas, though the development of modern gun turrets would come with subsequent designs. They were the first in a series of British battleships designed by William Henry White, the Director of Naval Construction (DNC); he was to be responsible for most of the pre-dreadnoughts built in Britain.

All eight ships had entered service by 1894, with most serving with the Channel Fleet initially, though Ramillies and Hood were assigned to the Mediterranean Fleet and Revenge and Royal Oak served briefly with the Flying Squadron in 1896. Empress of India and Royal Sovereign were transferred to the Mediterranean to take part in the International Squadron during a rebellion on the island of Crete in 1897. Starting in 1900, all members of the class in the Mediterranean were recalled to Britain for refits except Hood, and afterward they were placed in reserve by 1904–1905. Long-since obsolete by the early 1910s, the members of the class began to be discarded: Repulse was broken up in 1911 and Empress of India was expended as a target ship in 1913. Royal Sovereign and Ramillies were scrapped that year, and Royal Oak and Resolution followed in 1914. After the British entry into the First World War in August 1914, Hood was scuttled as a blockship to bar one of the entrances to Portland Harbour. Revenge was the only member of the class to see active service during the war, being used for coastal bombardment off Flanders. Converted to a barracks ship by late 1915, she was ultimately scrapped in 1919.

Summary of the Royal Sovereign class
Ship	Armament	Armour	Displacement	Propulsion	Service		
Ship	Armament	Armour	Displacement	Propulsion	Laid down	Commissioned	Fate
HMS Royal Sovereign	4 × 13.5 in (343 mm) guns	18 in (457 mm)	15,580 long tons (15,830 t)	2 × shafts 2 × triple-expansion steam engines 16 knots (30 km/h; 18 mph)	30 September 1889	31 May 1892	Broken up, 1913
HMS Hood	4 × 13.5 in (343 mm) guns	18 in (457 mm)	15,580 long tons (15,830 t)	2 × shafts 2 × triple-expansion steam engines 16 knots (30 km/h; 18 mph)	17 August 1889	1 June 1893	Sunk as blockship, 4 November 1914
HMS Empress of India	4 × 13.5 in (343 mm) guns	18 in (457 mm)	15,580 long tons (15,830 t)	2 × shafts 2 × triple-expansion steam engines 16 knots (30 km/h; 18 mph)	9 July 1889	11 September 1893	Sunk as target, 1913
HMS Ramillies	4 × 13.5 in (343 mm) guns	18 in (457 mm)	15,580 long tons (15,830 t)	2 × shafts 2 × triple-expansion steam engines 16 knots (30 km/h; 18 mph)	11 August 1890	17 October 1893	Broken up, 1913
HMS Resolution	4 × 13.5 in (343 mm) guns	18 in (457 mm)	15,580 long tons (15,830 t)	2 × shafts 2 × triple-expansion steam engines 16 knots (30 km/h; 18 mph)	14 June 1890	5 December 1893	Broken up, 1914
HMS Revenge	4 × 13.5 in (343 mm) guns	18 in (457 mm)	15,580 long tons (15,830 t)	2 × shafts 2 × triple-expansion steam engines 16 knots (30 km/h; 18 mph)	12 February 1891	March 1894	Broken up, 1919
HMS Repulse	4 × 13.5 in (343 mm) guns	18 in (457 mm)	15,580 long tons (15,830 t)	2 × shafts 2 × triple-expansion steam engines 16 knots (30 km/h; 18 mph)	1 January 1890	25 April 1894	Broken up, 1911
HMS Royal Oak	4 × 13.5 in (343 mm) guns	18 in (457 mm)	15,580 long tons (15,830 t)	2 × shafts 2 × triple-expansion steam engines 16 knots (30 km/h; 18 mph)	29 May 1890	14 January 1896	Broken up, 1914

== Centurion class ==
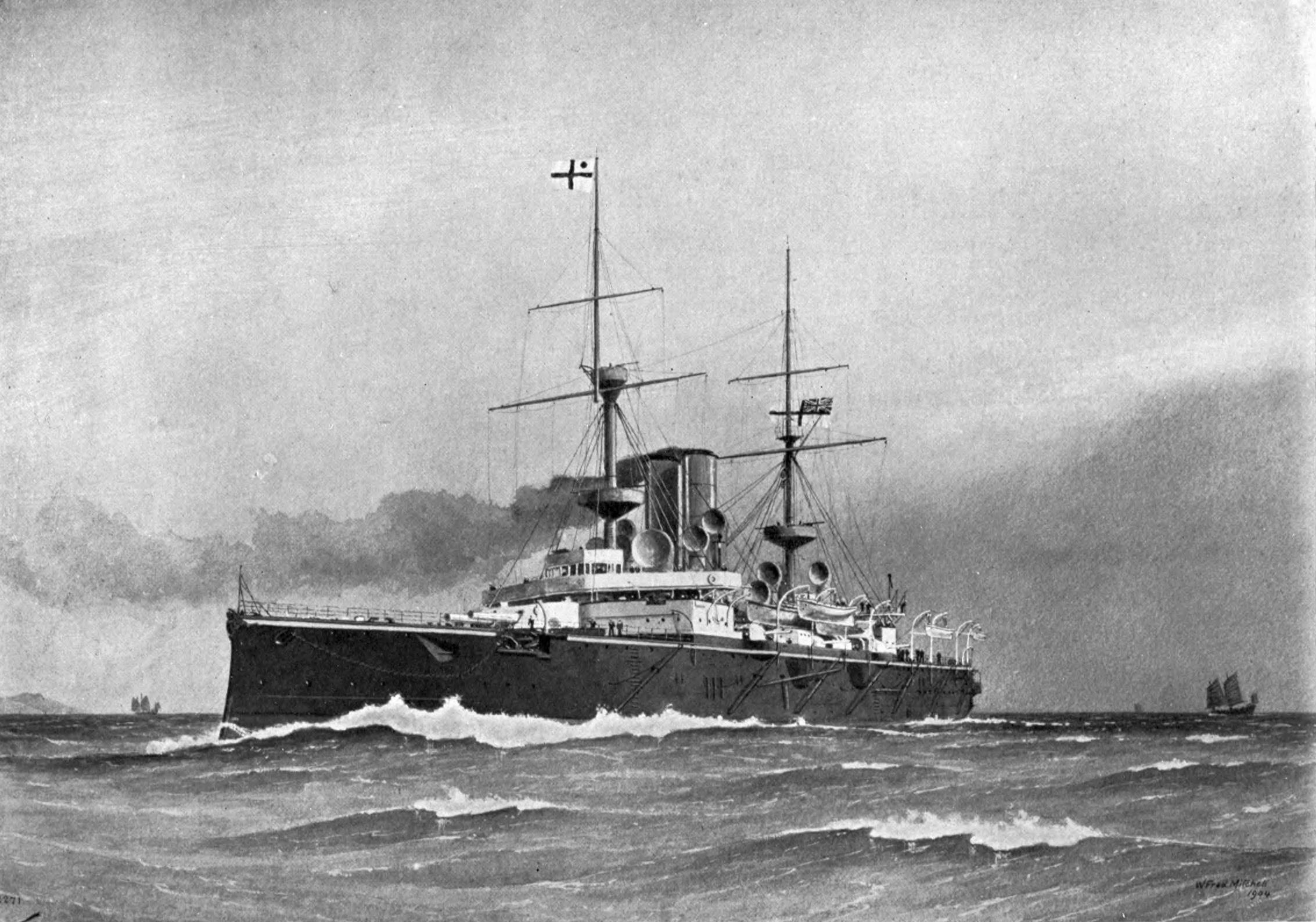
Illustration of HMS Centurion, c. 1904

The Centurion class, also designed by White, completed the initial ten new battleships called for by the Naval Defence Act 1889. They were intended to serve as flagships of the Pacific and China Stations, and as such, their design differed significantly from the Royal Sovereigns, though they were in many respects a scaled-down version of White's previous design. Because they would operate abroad, they required a significantly greater cruising range, and because dry dock facilities were limited in East Asia and the Pacific, their hulls were coppered to reduce biofouling and allow them to go longer between hull cleanings. Their most likely opponent at the time would have been Russian armoured cruisers, so they carried a lighter main battery of 10 in (254 mm) guns and thinner armour compared to the Royal Sovereigns.

Centurion served as the flagship of the China Station from her commissioning while Barfleur was initially sent to the Mediterranean Fleet, where she also joined the International Squadron in 1897. She moved to Chinese waters in 1898, and both ships were involved in the suppression of the Boxer Uprising in China in 1900, during which they sent landing parties to participate in the Battle of the Taku Forts and the Battle of Tientsin. Both ships returned to Britain in 1901 for reconstruction and Centurion briefly served in the China Station until 1905, when the renewal of the Anglo-Japanese Alliance rendered the presence of a significant British squadron redundant. The two vessels were placed in reserve that year and saw little activity before being placed for sale in 1909 and scrapped the following year.

Summary of the Centurion class
Ship	Armament	Armour	Displacement	Propulsion	Service		
Ship	Armament	Armour	Displacement	Propulsion	Laid down	Commissioned	Fate
HMS Centurion	4 × 10 in (254 mm) guns	12 in (305 mm)	10,500 long tons (10,670 t)	2 × shafts 2 × triple-expansion steam engines 17 kn (31 km/h; 20 mph)	30 March 1890	14 February 1894	Broken up, 1910
HMS Barfleur	4 × 10 in (254 mm) guns	12 in (305 mm)	10,500 long tons (10,670 t)	2 × shafts 2 × triple-expansion steam engines 17 kn (31 km/h; 20 mph)	12 October 1890	22 June 1894	Broken up, 1910

== HMS Renown ==
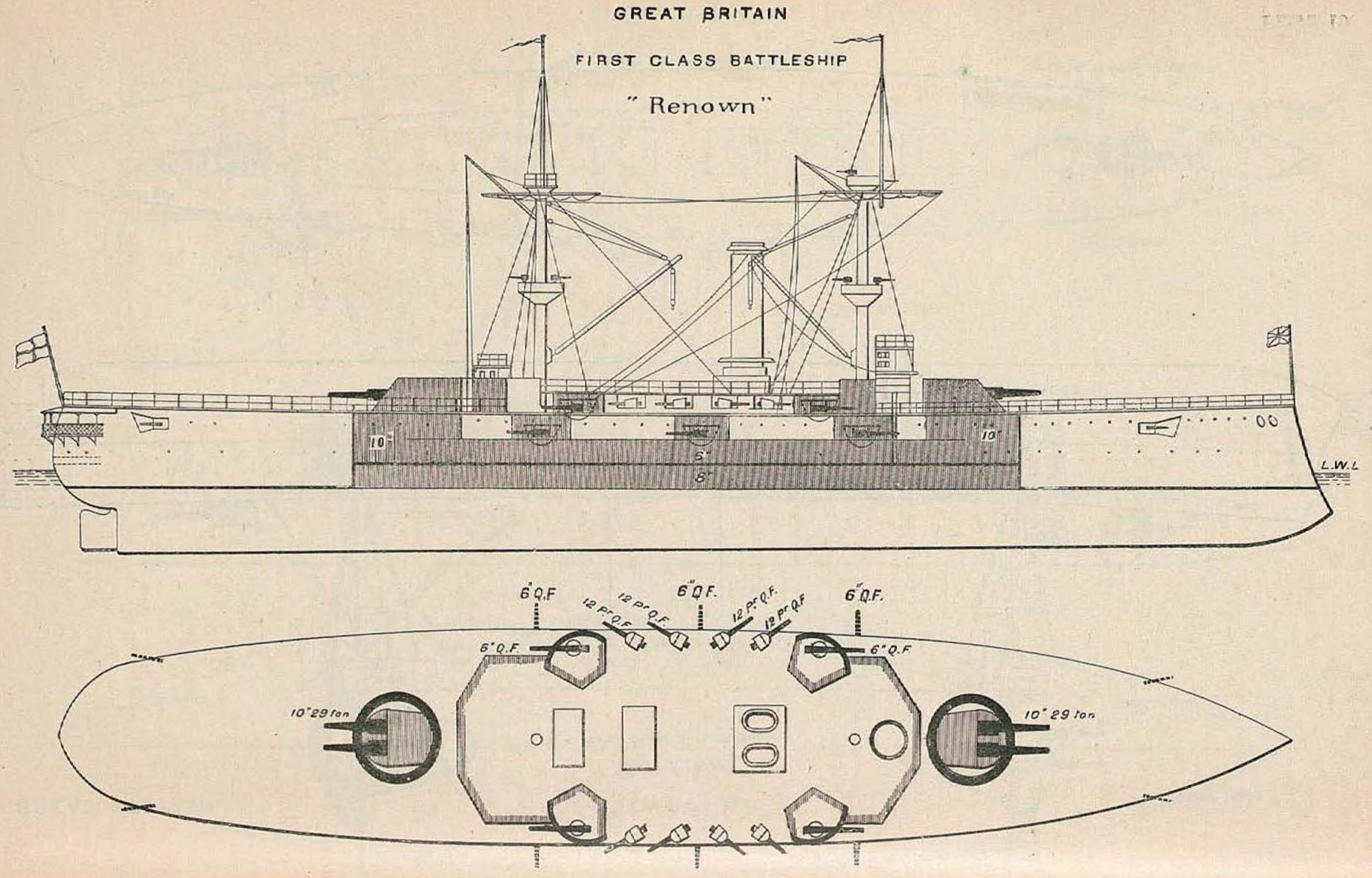
Top and profile sketch of HMS Renown

The 1892 construction programme had initially called for three new first-class battleships that were to be armed with a new 12 in (305 mm) gun, but development of the gun was delayed. At the request of the Controller of the Navy, Rear Admiral John A. "Jacky" Fisher, and the Director of Naval Intelligence, Captain Cyprian Bridge, an improved Centurion design was prepared, despite the fact that no requirements for a third vessel of the second class existed. Another White design, Renown incorporated several advances, including the first use of Harvey armour in the Royal Navy, the first sloped armour deck, and the first adoption of modern, enclosed gun shields (which would come to be known as gun turrets). Fisher pressed for six of the vessels to be built instead of what was to become the Majestic class, but the Admiralty rejected the request on the grounds that the 10 in (250 mm) main guns were insufficient for use against enemy battleships, and there was no need for large fleets of the vessels overseas.

Renown served as the flagship of the North America and West Indies Station, initially under Fisher's command. In 1899, she was refitted before being reassigned to the Mediterranean Fleet as its flagship, which was by then commanded by Fisher. In 1902, she was refitted again to carry the Duke and Duchess of Connaught on a royal tour of India, for which she was nicknamed the "battleship yacht". After a brief period in reserve in 1905, she received additional modifications for use as a royal yacht, and later that year she carried the Prince and Princess of Wales—the future King George V and Queen Mary—on a tour of India. She was used in a variety of subsidiary roles before being withdrawn from service in 1911 and broken up in 1914.

Summary of HMS Renown
Ship	Armament	Armour	Displacement	Propulsion	Service		
Ship	Armament	Armour	Displacement	Propulsion	Laid down	Commissioned	Fate
HMS Renown	4 × 10 in guns	8 in (203 mm)	12,865 long tons (13,071 t)	2 × shafts 2 × triple-expansion steam engines 17 knots (31 km/h; 20 mph)	1 February 1893	January 1897	Broken up, 1914

== Majestic class ==
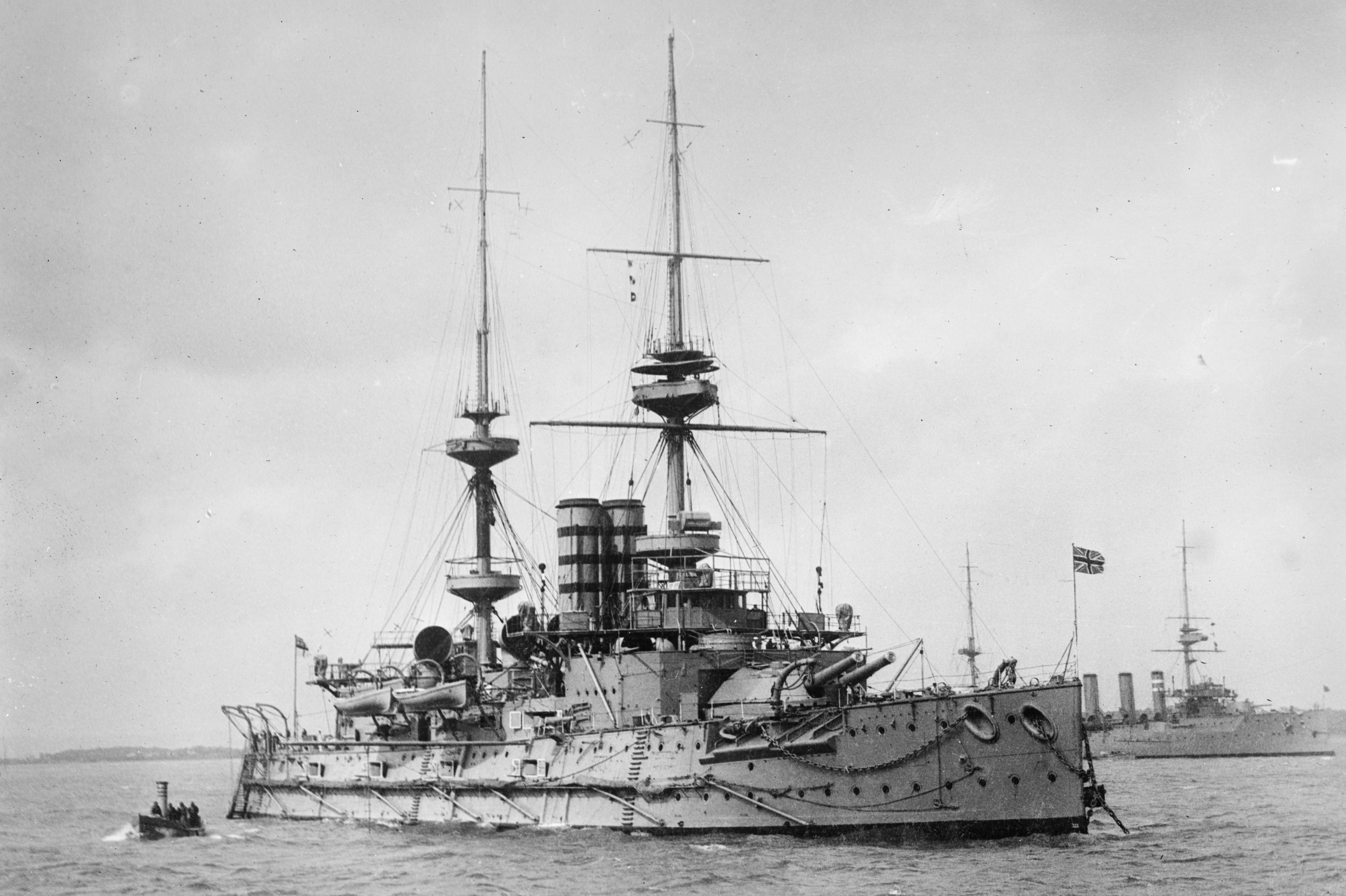
HMS Mars

Intended for the 1892 programme, what was initially to have been a class of three ships was delayed to the following year as the new 12-inch gun they were designed to carry had not completed testing. The design, also prepared by White, incorporated the same advances first seen with Renown in a larger first-class battleship (though White had in fact designed Majestic first). Due to public criticism, John Spencer, the First Lord of the Admiralty, ordered a total of nine new battleships as part of the so-called Spencer Programme to allay concerns that the Royal Navy had fallen in strength relative to France and Russia. The Majestics became a benchmark of battleship design, and they were widely copied, both generally with characteristics like the calibre of the main battery, and literally in that the Japanese Shikishima class and the battleship Mikasa were little more than minor improvements on the Majestics.

Most of the class joined the Channel Fleet on entering service and HMS Magnificent became the fleet flagship. HMS Caesar, HMS Illustrious, and HMS Victorious instead went to the Mediterranean Fleet upon their commissioning. Caesar and Illustrious joined the rest of the class in the Channel Fleet in 1903 and 1904 respectively, while Victorious was transferred to the China Station from 1898 to 1900, before returning to the Mediterranean until 1904, when she, too, joined the Channel Fleet. In 1906, the ships were reduced to the reserve, assigned to the Nore, Portsmouth, and Devonport Divisions, seeing little activity until the First World War, when they were mobilised. They served in a variety of roles through the first year of the war, including escorting the British Expeditionary Force to France in 1914, and as part of the force waging the Dardanelles campaign. There, Majestic was sunk by U-21 in May 1915. By that time, the ships of the class began to be withdrawn from service, disarmed, and reduced to subsidiary roles, including as depot ships, ammunition ships, and repair ships. Caesar, as a depot ship, was the last British pre-dreadnought to be used overseas when she supported the Allied intervention in the Russian Civil War in 1919. With no further use for the obsolete vessels, the Royal Navy sold the Majestics for scrap in the early 1920s.

Summary of the Majestic class
Ship	Armament	Armour	Displacement	Propulsion	Service		
Ship	Armament	Armour	Displacement	Propulsion	Laid down	Commissioned	Fate
HMS Magnificent	4 × 12 in guns	9 in (229 mm)	15,810 long tons (16,060 t)	2 × shafts 2 × triple-expansion steam engines 16 kn (30 km/h; 18 mph)	18 December 1893	12 December 1895	Broken up, 1921
HMS Majestic	4 × 12 in guns	9 in (229 mm)	15,810 long tons (16,060 t)	2 × shafts 2 × triple-expansion steam engines 16 kn (30 km/h; 18 mph)	5 February 1894	12 December 1895	Torpedoed, 27 May 1915
HMS Victorious	4 × 12 in guns	9 in (229 mm)	15,810 long tons (16,060 t)	2 × shafts 2 × triple-expansion steam engines 16 kn (30 km/h; 18 mph)	28 May 1894	4 November 1896	Broken up, 1923
HMS Prince George	4 × 12 in guns	9 in (229 mm)	15,810 long tons (16,060 t)	2 × shafts 2 × triple-expansion steam engines 16 kn (30 km/h; 18 mph)	10 September 1894	26 November 1896	Sunk on the way to the breakers 1921
HMS Jupiter	4 × 12 in guns	9 in (229 mm)	15,810 long tons (16,060 t)	2 × shafts 2 × triple-expansion steam engines 16 kn (30 km/h; 18 mph)	26 April 1894	8 June 1897	Broken up, 1920
HMS Mars	4 × 12 in guns	9 in (229 mm)	15,810 long tons (16,060 t)	2 × shafts 2 × triple-expansion steam engines 16 kn (30 km/h; 18 mph)	2 June 1894	8 June 1897	Broken up, 1921
HMS Caesar	4 × 12 in guns	9 in (229 mm)	15,810 long tons (16,060 t)	2 × shafts 2 × triple-expansion steam engines 16 kn (30 km/h; 18 mph)	25 March 1895	13 January 1898	Broken up, 1921
HMS Hannibal	4 × 12 in guns	9 in (229 mm)	15,810 long tons (16,060 t)	2 × shafts 2 × triple-expansion steam engines 16 kn (30 km/h; 18 mph)	1 May 1895	April 1898	Broken up, 1920
HMS Illustrious	4 × 12 in guns	9 in (229 mm)	15,810 long tons (16,060 t)	2 × shafts 2 × triple-expansion steam engines 16 kn (30 km/h; 18 mph)	11 March 1895	15 April 1898	Broken up, 1920

== Canopus class ==
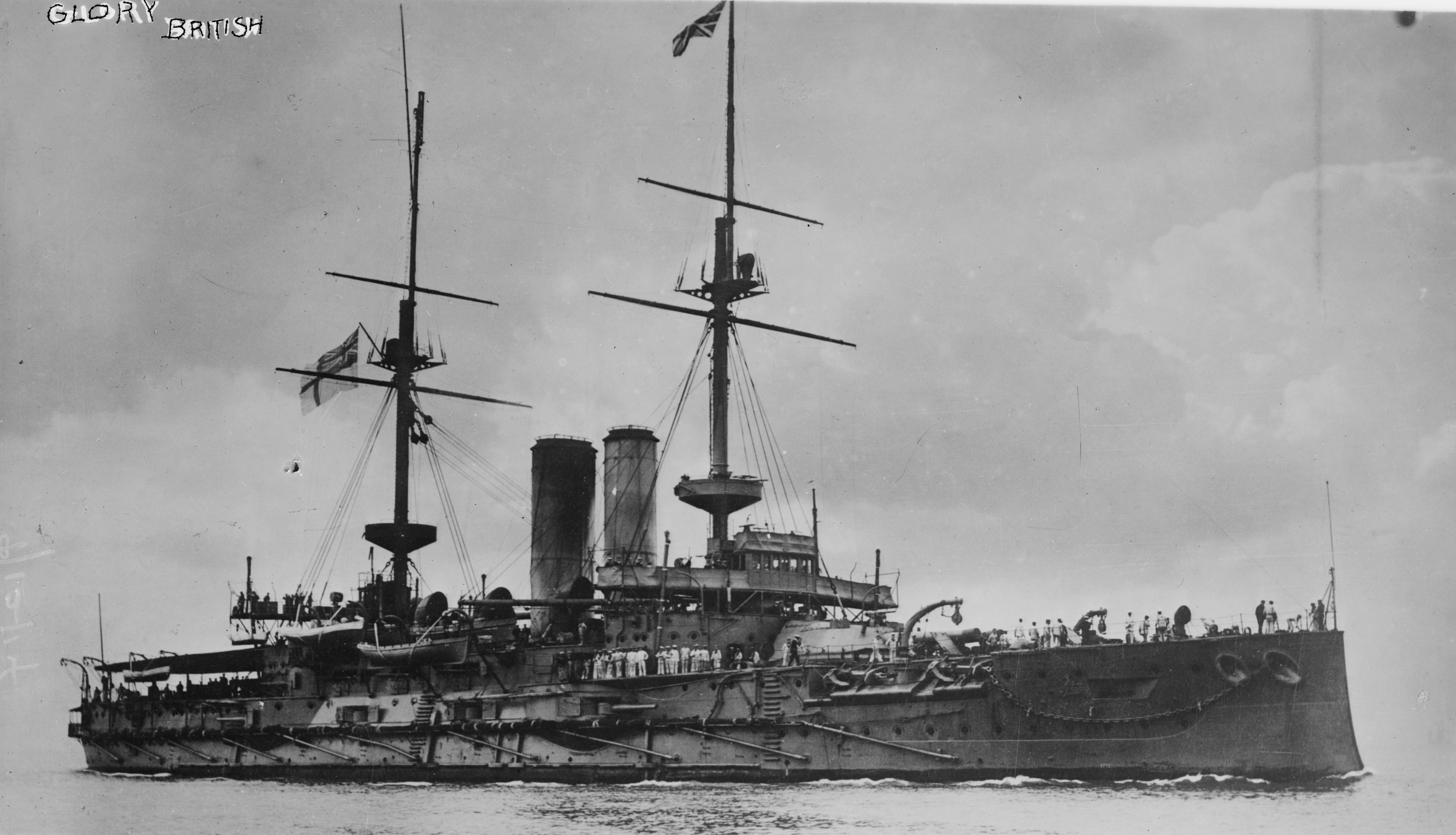
HMS Glory

While the Centurion class and Renown had been designed with Russian armoured cruisers in mind, the rise of the Imperial Japanese Navy as a major naval power in the mid-1890s led White to suggest more powerful battleships for the China Station. White proposed a battleship with the same armament as the Majestics, the freeboard of Centurion, and the speed and fuel capacity of Renown; these characteristics would come at the cost of reducing the belt armour to 6 in (152 mm). During the design process, Krupp armour became available, so the reduction in thickness accounted for less of a decrease in effective protection than the mathematics would imply. The weight savings actually allowed for more a comprehensive protection layout compared to earlier vessels. The Canopus class was the first British battleship design to use water-tube boilers. Six members of the class were built, and while they proved capable of the task for which they had been designed, many officers in the fleet were opposed to the nominal reduction in their belt armour effectiveness.

Canopus initially served in the Mediterranean before joining her sisters on the China Station, though the Anglo-Japanese Alliance permitted their withdrawal in 1905, as with the Centurions. Upon returning to home waters, they were assigned to the Channel, Home, and Atlantic Fleets. Canopus, Glory, Ocean, and Goliath were sent to the Mediterranean Fleet in 1908–1910, thereafter being reduced to reserve status. At the start of war, the ships were mobilised and saw extensive service in various secondary theatres. Their age rendered them more expendable than the newer battleships of the Grand Fleet, and so they were used more aggressively than the vessels containing the German High Seas Fleet in the North Sea. Canopus was sent to join the hunt for the German East Asia Squadron; she missed the Battle of Coronel but fired the first shots in the Battle of the Falkland Islands. Goliath was part of the force that battled the German light cruiser SMS Königsberg in German East Africa, while Albion, Vengeance, and Ocean supported operations elsewhere in Africa. Several of the ships took part in the Dardanelles campaign in 1915, where Ocean and Goliath were sunk during the fighting. The surviving ships saw little activity after 1915, though Glory was the flagship of the British North Russia Squadron in 1916. The four ships were ultimately scrapped in the post-war reduction in the fleet's strength in 1919–1922.

Summary of the Canopus class
Ship	Armament	Armour	Displacement	Propulsion	Service		
Ship	Armament	Armour	Displacement	Propulsion	Laid down	Commissioned	Fate
HMS Canopus	4 × 12 in guns	6 in (152 mm)	14,300 long tons (14,529 t)	2 × shafts 2 × triple-expansion steam engines 18 kn (33 km/h; 21 mph)	4 January 1897	5 December 1899	Broken up, 1920
HMS Ocean	4 × 12 in guns	6 in (152 mm)	14,300 long tons (14,529 t)	2 × shafts 2 × triple-expansion steam engines 18 kn (33 km/h; 21 mph)	15 February 1897	20 February 1900	Mined, 18 March 1915
HMS Goliath	4 × 12 in guns	6 in (152 mm)	14,300 long tons (14,529 t)	2 × shafts 2 × triple-expansion steam engines 18 kn (33 km/h; 21 mph)	4 January 1897	27 March 1900	Torpedoed, 13 May 1915
HMS Glory	4 × 12 in guns	6 in (152 mm)	14,300 long tons (14,529 t)	2 × shafts 2 × triple-expansion steam engines 18 kn (33 km/h; 21 mph)	1 December 1896	1 November 1900	Broken up, 1922
HMS Albion	4 × 12 in guns	6 in (152 mm)	14,300 long tons (14,529 t)	2 × shafts 2 × triple-expansion steam engines 18 kn (33 km/h; 21 mph)	3 December 1896	25 June 1901	Broken up, 1919
HMS Vengeance	4 × 12 in guns	6 in (152 mm)	14,300 long tons (14,529 t)	2 × shafts 2 × triple-expansion steam engines 18 kn (33 km/h; 21 mph)	23 August 1898	8 April 1902	Broken up, 1921

== Formidable class ==
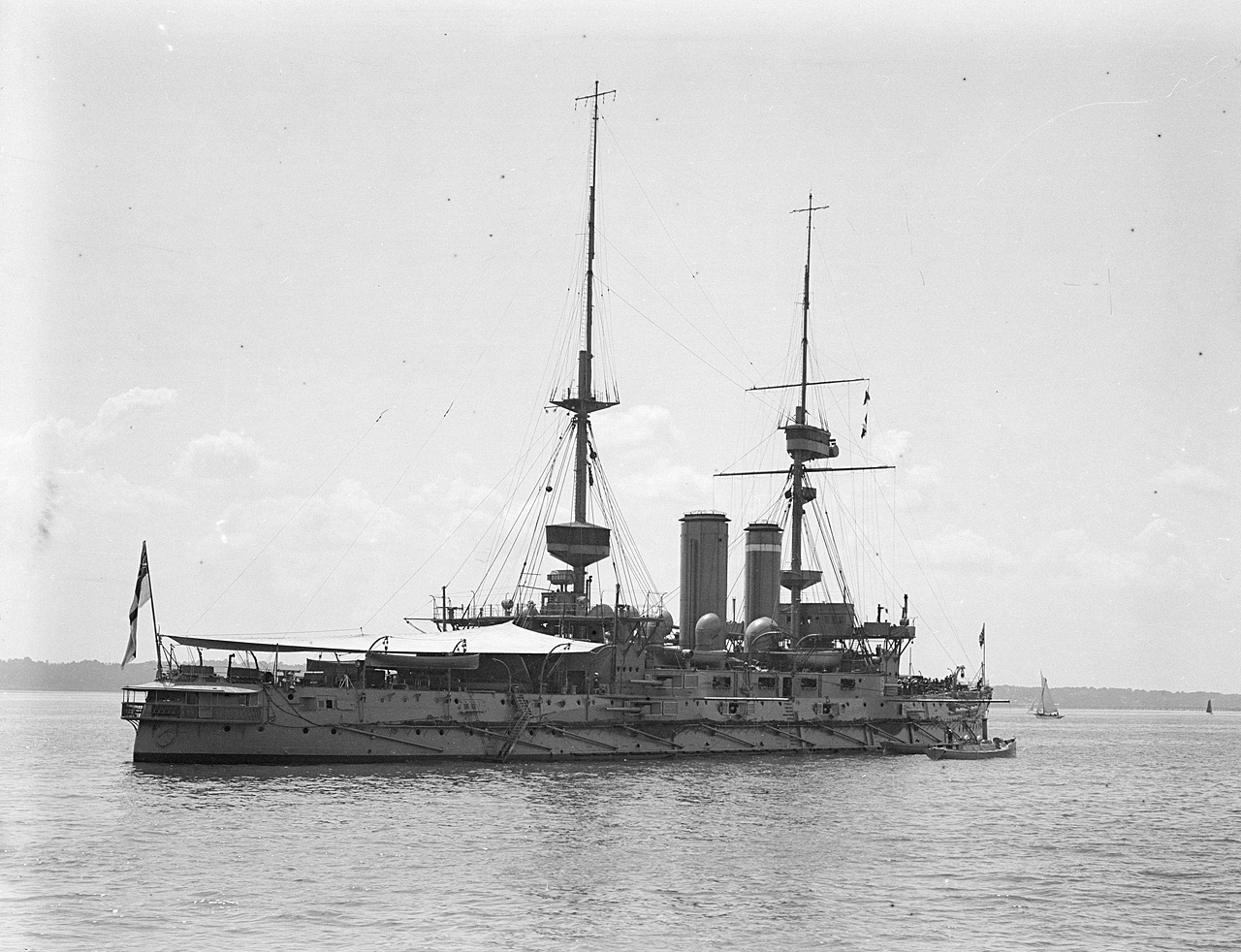
HMS Implacable

The Formidable class arose as an improvement on the Majestic design, incorporating the innovations of the Canopus class—Krupp armour and water-tube boilers—along with a new, more powerful, 40-calibre 12 in gun. Belt thickness was to return to 9 in to address criticism of the Canopus design. The Formidable design used the same basic hull as the Majestic class, which was larger than the Canopus-class hull, but weight savings from the superior Krupp armour and improved propulsion systems allowed displacement to remain roughly the same as the Majestics. Hydrodynamic testing with a model allowed White and the design staff to make refinements to the hull shape that improved their handling characteristics.

All three ships were sent to the Mediterranean Fleet on entering service, though in 1908, Formidable and Irresistible were recalled to British waters, serving in succession in the Channel, Home, and then Atlantic Fleets. Implacable joined them in the Atlantic Fleet the following year. They returned to the Home Fleet in 1911–1912, where they remained as part of the 5th Battle Squadron until the start of war in 1914. The 5th Squadron was stationed in the English Channel at the start of the war, and Formidable was torpedoed there in the early hours of 1 January 1915 by the U-boat U-24. Irresistible was sent to the Dardanelles campaign, where she was lost to Ottoman naval mines in March. Implacable was then sent to replace her, and she was present for the landings at Cape Helles and at Anzac Cove in April. Following the failure of the Gallipoli campaign, she was sent to Greece before returning to Britain in 1917 and reduced to a depot ship, ultimately being scrapped in 1921.

Summary of the Formidable class
Ship	Armament	Armour	Displacement	Propulsion	Service		
Ship	Armament	Armour	Displacement	Propulsion	Laid down	Commissioned	Fate
HMS Formidable	4 × 12 in guns	9 in	15,805 to 15,930 long tons (16,059 to 16,186 t)	2 × shafts 2 × triple-expansion steam engines 18 knots (33 km/h; 21 mph)	21 March 1898	10 October 1901	Torpedoed, 1 January 1915
HMS Implacable	4 × 12 in guns	9 in	15,805 to 15,930 long tons (16,059 to 16,186 t)	2 × shafts 2 × triple-expansion steam engines 18 knots (33 km/h; 21 mph)	13 July 1898	10 September 1901	Broken up, 1921
HMS Irresistible	4 × 12 in guns	9 in	15,805 to 15,930 long tons (16,059 to 16,186 t)	2 × shafts 2 × triple-expansion steam engines 18 knots (33 km/h; 21 mph)	11 April 1898	4 February 1902	Mined, 18 March 1915

== London class ==
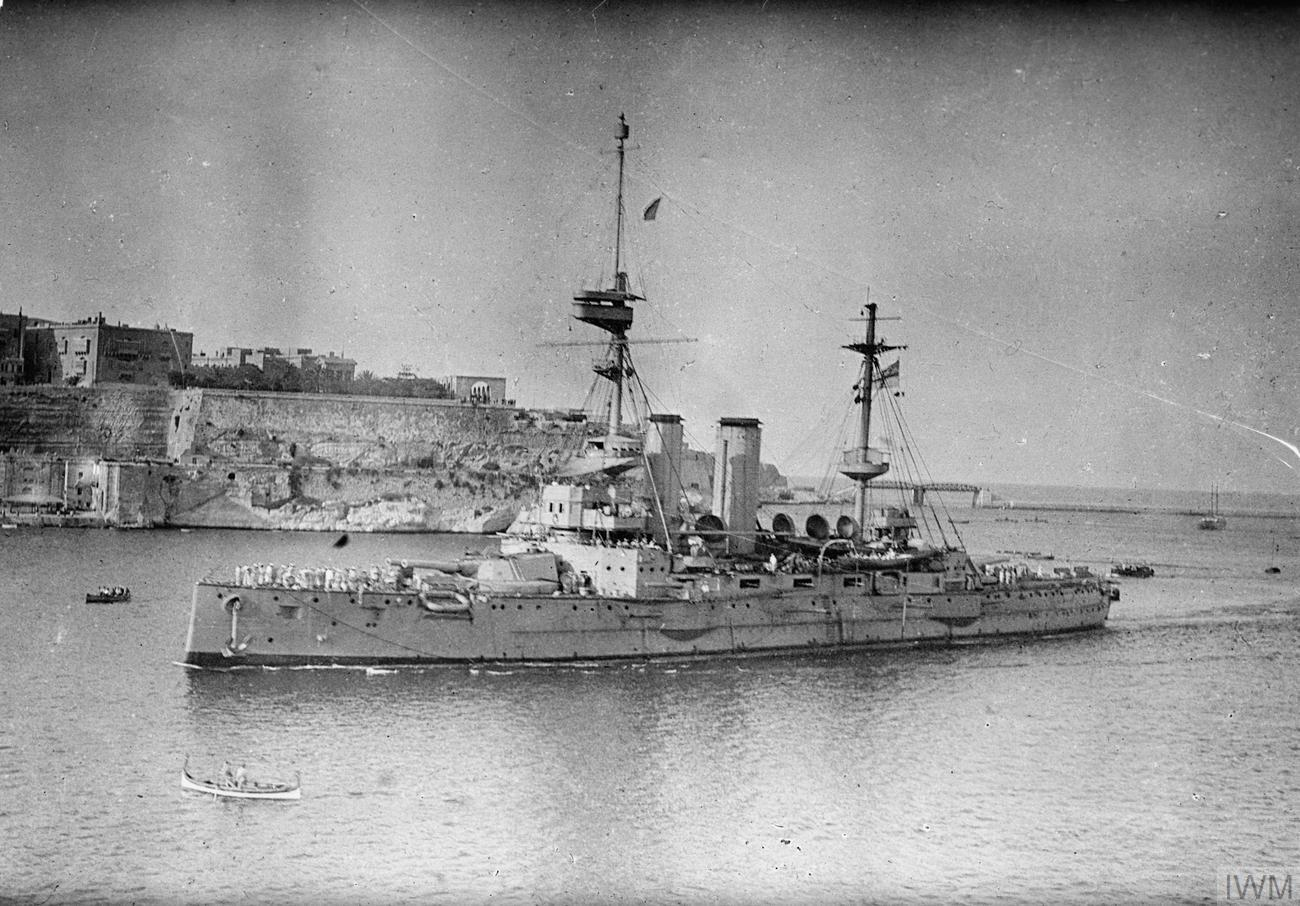
HMS London

The London class were, in most respects, repeats of the Formidable design, which has led some historians, like Tony Gibbons, to treat them as one class. Significant changes with the ships' armour layout have led most historians to classify them as a separate class. The first three members of the class were ordered in 1898 in response to Russian naval construction; White had been in the process of preparing the next design, which became the Duncan class, but the need to begin construction immediately led him to delay the Duncans in favour of a modified Formidable. The chief alterations lay with the arrangement of the armour in the ships' bows. Instead of terminating the heavy belt armour at the forward barbette with a transverse bulkhead, White discarded the heavy bulkhead and extended the belt all the way to the stem, albeit with reduced thickness. Two further ships, Queen and Prince of Wales, sometimes regarded as a separate class themselves, were begun in 1901 after work on the Duncan class had begun.

Like the Formidables, all five Londons were assigned to the Mediterranean Fleet before being recalled to Britain between 1907 and 1909, thereafter serving with the various fleets in home waters, ultimately ending up in the 5th Battle Squadron by 1912. In 1912 and 1913, London was used in experiments with a flying-off ramp for aircraft. The ships served with 5th Squadron during the first months of the war, though in November, Bulwark was destroyed by an accidental magazine explosion. Venerable was used to bombard German positions in Flanders in October and November 1914, while the other three members of the class were sent to the Dardanelles. Venerable joined them there in mid-1915, but by the end of 1916 Queen had been reduced to a depot ship and London and Venerable had returned to Britain to be decommissioned; Prince of Wales joined them there in early 1917. As with the other surviving pre-dreadnoughts, all four ships were sold for scrap in 1920.

Summary of the London class
Ship	Armament	Armour	Displacement	Propulsion	Service		
Ship	Armament	Armour	Displacement	Propulsion	Laid down	Commissioned	Fate
HMS Bulwark	4 × 12 in guns	9 in	15,700 long tons (15,952 t)	2 × shafts 2 × triple-expansion steam engines 18 knots (33 km/h; 21 mph)	20 March 1899	11 March 1902	Destroyed by accidental explosion, 26 November 1914
HMS London	4 × 12 in guns	9 in	15,700 long tons (15,952 t)	2 × shafts 2 × triple-expansion steam engines 18 knots (33 km/h; 21 mph)	8 December 1898	7 June 1902	Broken up, 1920
HMS Venerable	4 × 12 in guns	9 in	15,700 long tons (15,952 t)	2 × shafts 2 × triple-expansion steam engines 18 knots (33 km/h; 21 mph)	2 January 1899	12 November 1902	Broken up, 1920
HMS Queen	4 × 12 in guns	9 in	15,700 long tons (15,952 t)	2 × shafts 2 × triple-expansion steam engines 18 knots (33 km/h; 21 mph)	12 March 1901	7 April 1904	Broken up, 1920
HMS Prince of Wales	4 × 12 in guns	9 in	15,700 long tons (15,952 t)	2 × shafts 2 × triple-expansion steam engines 18 knots (33 km/h; 21 mph)	20 March 1901	18 May 1904	Broken up, 1920

== Duncan class ==
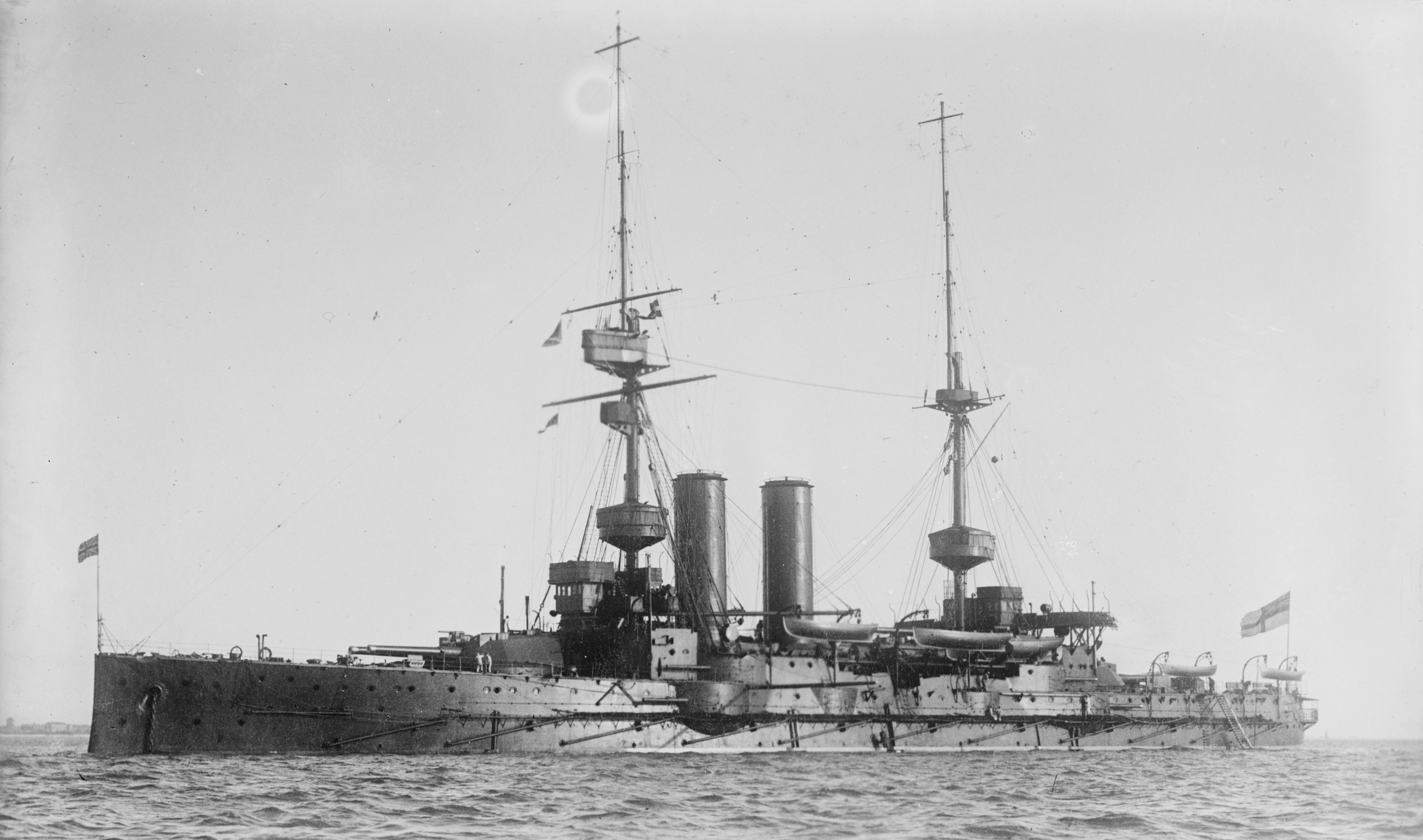
HMS Albemarle

After receiving what turned out to be overly optimistic reports of the capabilities of the new Russian Peresvet-class battleships, the Royal Navy decided to build ships that would be capable of meeting the Russian ships' reported top speed of 19 knots (35 km/h; 22 mph). White was compelled to reduce displacement by about 1,000 long tons (1,016 t) for budgetary reasons, which forced reductions in the scale of armour protection to meet the required speed needed to counter the Peresvets. White developed the revised bow protection scheme that had been incorporated into the Londons as a stopgap whilst he completed work on the Duncans. For much the same reason that naval officers disliked the Canopus class, the Duncans were seen to be an inferior design. Despite their defensive limitations, the Duncan-class ships were the fastest battleships in the world at the time of their completion. A total of six ships were ordered, four in 1898 and two more in 1899.

All six ships served with the Mediterranean Fleet from their commissioning until 1905, when they were recalled to the Channel Fleet. HMS Montagu ran aground on Lundy Island in May 1906 and proved to be a total loss. The surviving ships were moved to the Atlantic Fleet in 1907 and then to the Home Fleet by 1912. They were constituted as the 6th Battle Squadron, and at the start of the First World War, the ships were used to strengthen the Northern Patrol, which enforced the blockade of Germany. During this period, they were reassigned to the 3rd Battle Squadron, Grand Fleet. The ships were gradually dispersed beginning in 1915, with Cornwallis and then Exmouth and Russell being sent to the Dardanelles. Duncan was deployed to patrol the central Atlantic and Albemarle was sent to Murmansk, Russia in 1916 as a guard ship. Russell struck a pair of mines in March 1916 and sank and Cornwallis was torpedoed and sunk by U-32 in January 1917. The three survivors were all broken up between 1919 and 1920.

Summary of the Duncan class
Ship	Armament	Armour	Displacement	Propulsion	Service		
Ship	Armament	Armour	Displacement	Propulsion	Laid down	Commissioned	Fate
HMS Russell	4 × 12 in guns	7 in (178 mm)	14,900 to 15,200 long tons (15,139 to 15,444 t)	2 × shafts 2 × triple-expansion steam engines 19 kn (35 km/h; 22 mph)	11 March 1899	19 February 1903	Mined, 27 March 1916
HMS Exmouth	4 × 12 in guns	7 in (178 mm)	14,900 to 15,200 long tons (15,139 to 15,444 t)	2 × shafts 2 × triple-expansion steam engines 19 kn (35 km/h; 22 mph)	10 August 1899	2 June 1903	Broken up, 1920
HMS Montagu	4 × 12 in guns	7 in (178 mm)	14,900 to 15,200 long tons (15,139 to 15,444 t)	2 × shafts 2 × triple-expansion steam engines 19 kn (35 km/h; 22 mph)	23 November 1899	28 July 1903	Wrecked, 30 May 1906
HMS Duncan	4 × 12 in guns	7 in (178 mm)	14,900 to 15,200 long tons (15,139 to 15,444 t)	2 × shafts 2 × triple-expansion steam engines 19 kn (35 km/h; 22 mph)	10 July 1899	8 October 1903	Broken up, 1920
HMS Albemarle	4 × 12 in guns	7 in (178 mm)	14,900 to 15,200 long tons (15,139 to 15,444 t)	2 × shafts 2 × triple-expansion steam engines 19 kn (35 km/h; 22 mph)	8 January 1900	12 November 1903	Broken up, 1919
HMS Cornwallis	4 × 12 in guns	7 in (178 mm)	14,900 to 15,200 long tons (15,139 to 15,444 t)	2 × shafts 2 × triple-expansion steam engines 19 kn (35 km/h; 22 mph)	19 July 1899	9 February 1904	Torpedoed, 9 January 1917

== King Edward VII class ==
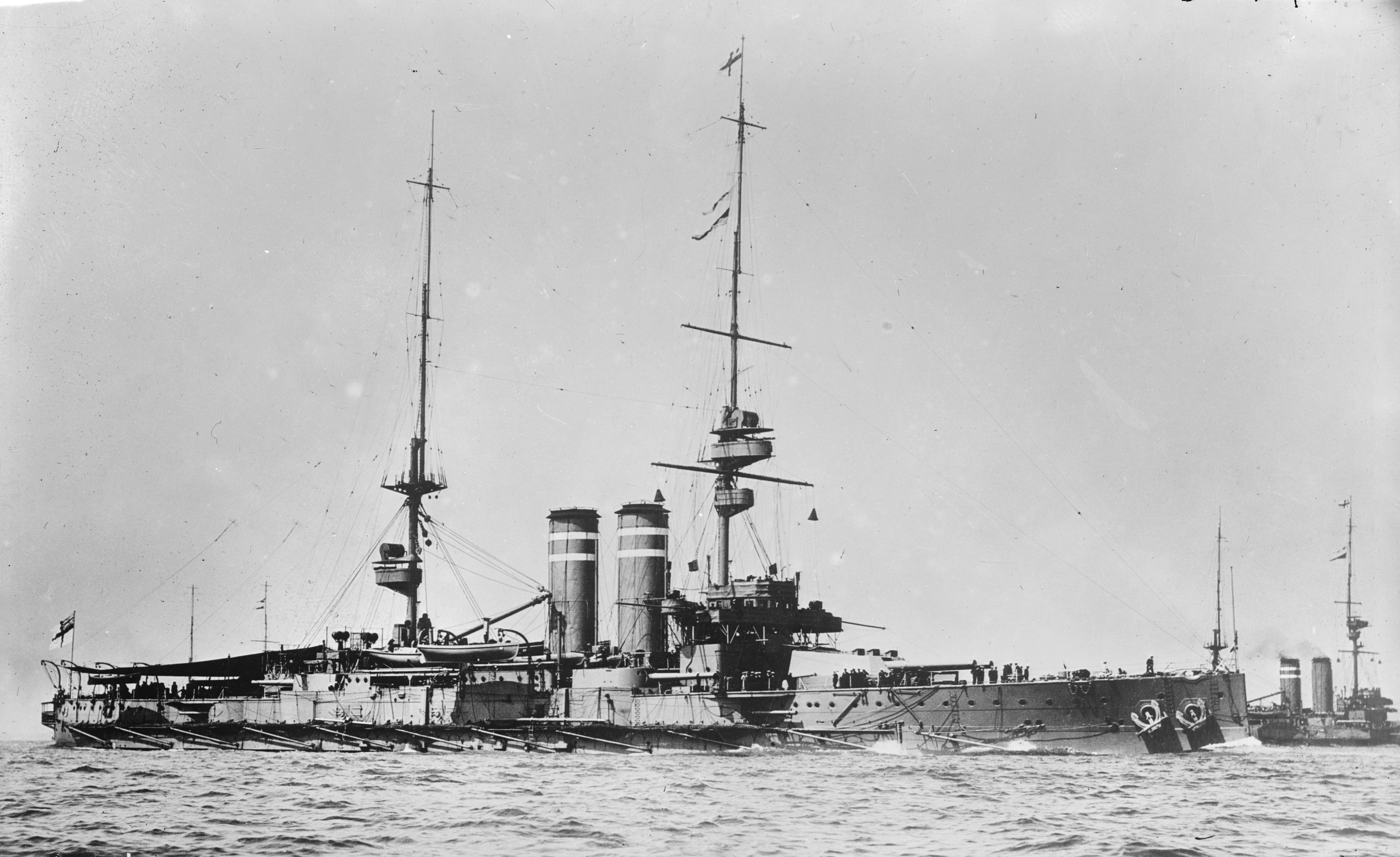
HMS King Edward VII

By the early 1900s, several foreign navies began building battleships with heavy secondary batteries, including the American Virginia class and the Italian Regina Margherita class, both of which carried 8 in (203 mm) guns compared to the standard British armament of 6 in (152 mm) guns. When design work on what would become the King Edward VII class started in 1901, White's staff (initially without White himself, who was ill) submitted a proposal that carried 7.5 in (190 mm) guns in four wing turrets. Upon White's return, he suggested they be increased to 9.2 in (230 mm), which the Admiralty accepted. The increase in calibre brought significant problems, however, since the weight high in the ship rendered the vessels prone to severe rolling and forced the designers to reduce freeboard. They also suffered the same fate as many late pre-dreadnoughts, being completed shortly before the advent of the all-big-gun Dreadnought in 1906. They were the last battleships designed during White's tenure as DNC.

The ships initially served with the Atlantic Fleet, with King Edward VII as its flagship, per the request of her namesake, the sitting monarch. In 1907, they were moved to the Channel Fleet, and between 1908 and 1909, they were all moved again to the Home Fleet, later being organised as the 3rd Battle Squadron, Home Fleet. Africa and Hibernia were involved in experiments with aircraft launched from flying-off decks erected on the ships, and Hibernia was the first British warship to launch an aeroplane. All of the ships were sent to the Mediterranean during the First Balkan War in 1912. During the First World War, they operated with the Grand Fleet, but they did not see action during this period. In January 1916, King Edward VII struck a mine and sank. Later that year the 3rd Squadron was detached from the fleet and dispersed. Britannia was torpedoed by UB-50 on 9 November 1918, two days before the end of the war. The six surviving members of the class were broken up in the early 1920s.

Summary of the King Edward VII class
Ship	Armament	Armour	Displacement	Propulsion	Service		
Ship	Armament	Armour	Displacement	Propulsion	Laid down	Commissioned	Fate
HMS King Edward VII	4 × 12 in guns 4 × 9.2 in (234 mm) guns	9 in	17,290 long tons (17,567 t)	2 × shafts 2 × triple-expansion steam engines 18.5 kn (34.3 km/h; 21.3 mph)	8 March 1902	7 February 1905	Mined, 6 January 1916
HMS Commonwealth	4 × 12 in guns 4 × 9.2 in (234 mm) guns	9 in	17,290 long tons (17,567 t)	2 × shafts 2 × triple-expansion steam engines 18.5 kn (34.3 km/h; 21.3 mph)	17 June 1902	9 May 1905	Broken up, 1921
HMS New Zealand	4 × 12 in guns 4 × 9.2 in (234 mm) guns	9 in	17,290 long tons (17,567 t)	2 × shafts 2 × triple-expansion steam engines 18.5 kn (34.3 km/h; 21.3 mph)	9 February 1903	11 July 1905	Broken up, 1921
HMS Dominion	4 × 12 in guns 4 × 9.2 in (234 mm) guns	9 in	17,290 long tons (17,567 t)	2 × shafts 2 × triple-expansion steam engines 18.5 kn (34.3 km/h; 21.3 mph)	23 May 1902	15 August 1905	Broken up, 1921
HMS Hindustan	4 × 12 in guns 4 × 9.2 in (234 mm) guns	9 in	17,290 long tons (17,567 t)	2 × shafts 2 × triple-expansion steam engines 18.5 kn (34.3 km/h; 21.3 mph)	25 October 1902	22 August 1905	Broken up, 1921
HMS Britannia	4 × 12 in guns 4 × 9.2 in (234 mm) guns	9 in	17,290 long tons (17,567 t)	2 × shafts 2 × triple-expansion steam engines 18.5 kn (34.3 km/h; 21.3 mph)	4 February 1902	8 September 1906	Torpedoed, 9 November 1918
HMS Africa	4 × 12 in guns 4 × 9.2 in (234 mm) guns	9 in	17,290 long tons (17,567 t)	2 × shafts 2 × triple-expansion steam engines 18.5 kn (34.3 km/h; 21.3 mph)	27 January 1904	6 November 1906	Broken up, 1920
HMS Hibernia	4 × 12 in guns 4 × 9.2 in (234 mm) guns	9 in	17,290 long tons (17,567 t)	2 × shafts 2 × triple-expansion steam engines 18.5 kn (34.3 km/h; 21.3 mph)	6 January 1904	2 January 1907	Broken up, 1921

== Swiftsure class ==
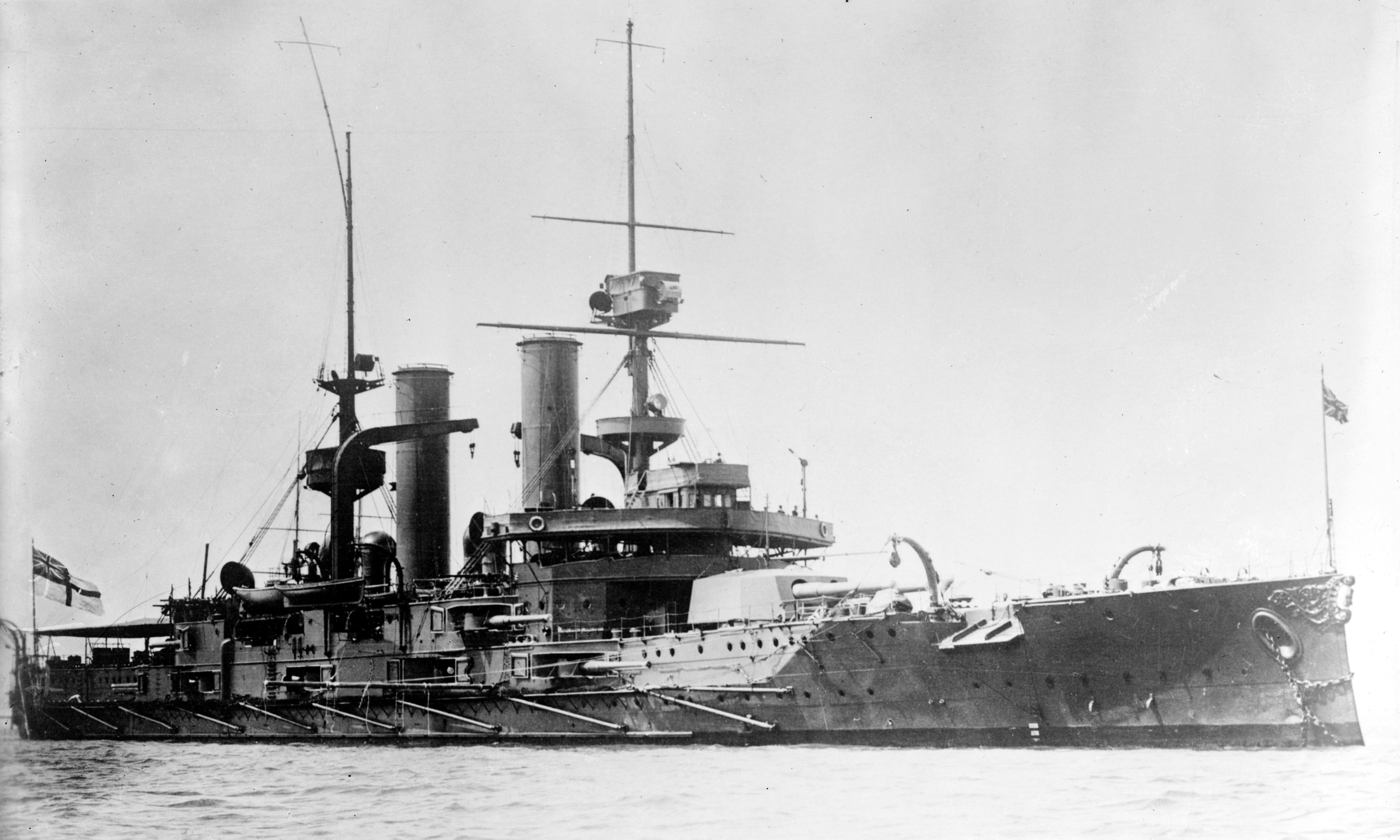
HMS Swiftsure

The two Swiftsure-class ships mark a significant departure from the other pre-dreadnought battleships built by Britain during the period, primarily because they had not been built for the Royal Navy. During the Argentine–Chilean naval arms race, Chile ordered the two battleships—to have been named Constitución and Libertad—from British shipyards in response to a pair of Argentinian armoured cruisers that had been ordered from Italy. Since they were intended to combat cruisers, the designers opted for a second-class ship armed with 10 in guns and a relatively heavy secondary battery of 7.5 in (190 mm) guns. Britain brokered the Pacts of May that ended the race. After Russia sought to purchase Chile's battleships, Britain intervened and bought them to prevent the Russians from strengthening their fleet at the expense of Britain's ally Japan. Relatively minor work was required to bring them up to British standards, primarily centring around modifying the guns to accept British ammunition.

The two ships, renamed Swiftsure and Triumph in British service, were assigned to the Home Fleet and then the Channel Fleet; both vessels were sent to the Mediterranean Fleet in 1909, remaining there until 1912. Swiftsure became the flagship of the East Indies Station in 1913 and Triumph was sent to the China Station that year. Swiftsure escorted troopship convoys in the Indian Ocean at the start of the war, while Triumph joined the search for the East Asia Squadron and then participated in the Siege of Tsingtao. Both ships were transferred to the Dardanelles campaign in 1915, and Triumph was torpedoed and sunk by U-21 two days before the latter also sank Majestic. Swiftsure was reassigned to the 9th Cruiser Squadron in early 1916 for convoy operations in the Atlantic before being paid off in 1917 to free up crews for anti-submarine vessels. She was ultimately scrapped in 1920.

Summary of the Swiftsure class
Ship	Armament	Armour	Displacement	Propulsion	Service		
Ship	Armament	Armour	Displacement	Propulsion	Laid down	Commissioned	Fate
HMS Swiftsure	4 × 10 in guns	7 in	13,840 long tons (14,060 t)	2 × shafts 2 × triple-expansion steam engines 19 knots (35 km/h; 22 mph)	26 February 1902	21 June 1904	Broken up, 1920
HMS Triumph	4 × 10 in guns	7 in	13,840 long tons (14,060 t)	2 × shafts 2 × triple-expansion steam engines 19 knots (35 km/h; 22 mph)	26 February 1902	21 June 1904	Torpedoed, 25 May 1915

== Lord Nelson class ==
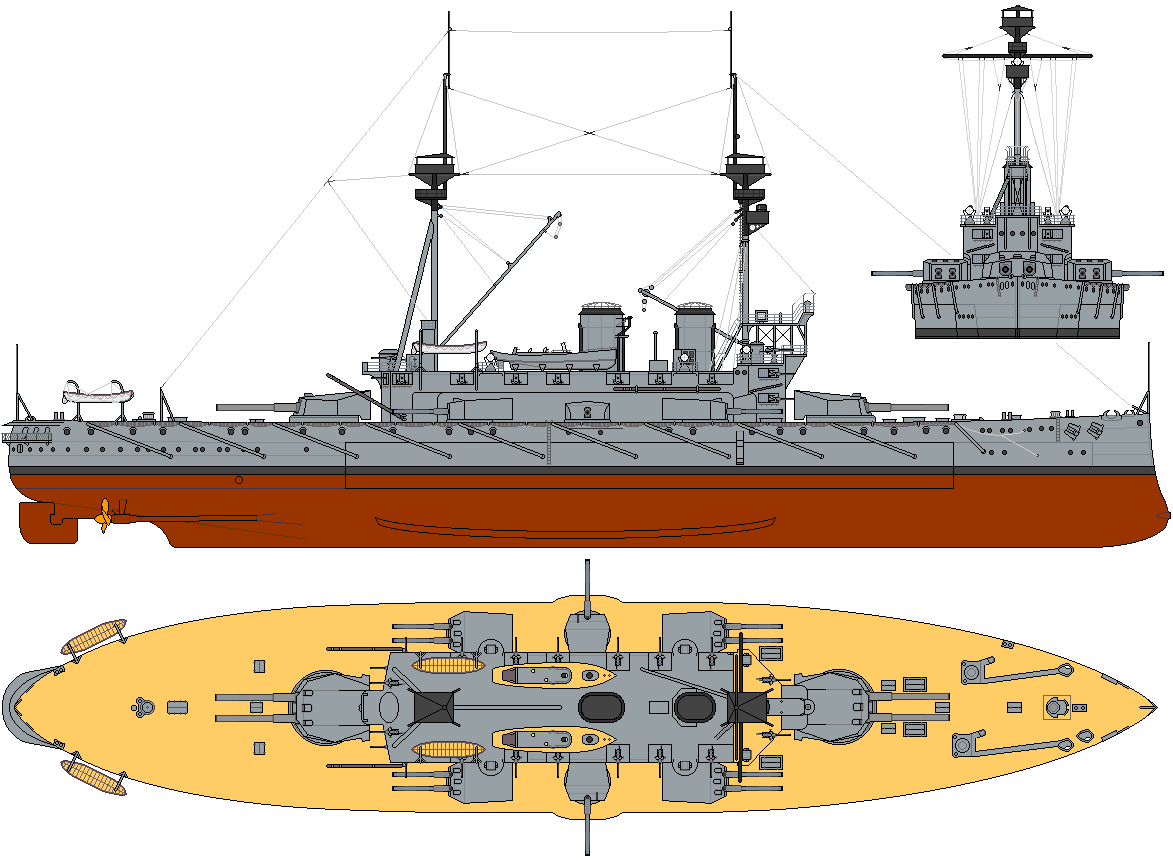
Side and profile illustration of HMS Agamemnon

Developments in naval gunnery and torpedo technology were pushing expected battle ranges to greater distances in the early 1900s, since effective fire could be opened at greater range and the increased capabilities of torpedoes would discourage short-range fighting. At greater ranges, lighter guns had less use, pointing the way to the development of dreadnought battleships. Philip Watts, who replaced White as DNC in 1902, began the design process with studies that demonstrated the traditional 6 in gun would be of little use, and so prepared design variants with an armament of only 12 in and 9.2 in (234 mm) guns (and light anti-torpedo boat guns) and a uniform battery of 10 in weapons. The Admiralty approved a design with four 12 in and twelve 9.2 in guns in August 1903; but, when it became clear that the ships would be too large for some existing dock facilities, Watts had to make revisions that included reducing the secondary battery by two guns.

Lord Nelson and Agamemnon were completed in 1908, having been delayed significantly by the transferral of material intended for them (most significantly their main battery turrets) to Dreadnought so that vessel could be rushed through production. Lord Nelson became the flagship of the Nore Division, to which Agamemnon was also assigned. After the start of the war, both vessels were transferred to the Channel Fleet and covered the crossing of the British Expeditionary Force to France. They then joined the fleet off the Dardanelles in 1915 and spent the rest of the war in the eastern Mediterranean to guard against a sortie by the ex-German battlecruiser Goeben, now under Ottoman control as Yavuz Sultan Selim. Neither Lord Nelson-class ship was able to reach the area in time to intervene in the Battle of Imbros when the Ottoman vessel surprised and sank a pair of monitors. After the war, Lord Nelson was scrapped in 1920, while Agamemnon survived for several years as a radio-controlled target ship, ultimately being broken up in 1927. She was, by that time, the last British pre-dreadnought still in existence.

Summary of the Lord Nelson class
Ship	Armament	Armour	Displacement	Propulsion	Service		
Ship	Armament	Armour	Displacement	Propulsion	Laid down	Commissioned	Fate
HMS Agamemnon	4 × 12 in guns 10 × 9.2 in guns	12 in	17,820 long tons (18,106 t)	2 × shafts 2 × triple-expansion steam engines 18 knots (33 km/h; 21 mph)	15 May 1905	25 June 1908	Broken up, 1927
HMS Lord Nelson	4 × 12 in guns 10 × 9.2 in guns	12 in	17,820 long tons (18,106 t)	2 × shafts 2 × triple-expansion steam engines 18 knots (33 km/h; 21 mph)	18 May 1905	1 December 1908	Broken up, 1920

== See also ==
- List of battleships
