= Henry Louis Fleet =

Vice-Admiral Henry Louis Fleet CBE
- Born: 1 May 1850
- Died: 17 September 1923 (aged 73)
- Military career
- Allegiance: United Kingdom
- Branch: Royal Navy
- Rank: Vice-Admiral
- Commands: HMS Howe; HMS Empress of India; HMS Aeolus
- Awards: Commander of the Order of the British Empire

Vice-Admiral Henry Louis Fleet, CBE (1 May 1850 – 17 September 1923) was a British Royal Navy officer in the years before the First World War.

== Naval career ==
Fleet was born in 1850, the third son of John George Fleet, of Gunnersbury. His elder brother Ferdinand F. Fleet was an Anglican priest.

He joined the Royal Navy in 1864, and was midshipman when he was in July 1869 posted to the ironclad HMS Monarch, for her first commission in the Channel Fleet. Later the same year he was transferred to the armoured frigate HMS Agincourt, serving on the same station. He was promoted to lieutenant in 1874, and commanded the gunboat HMS Express and the armoured cruiser HMS Northampton, before he was promoted to commander in June 1887. Promotion to captain followed on 1 January 1895. From 1 January 1897 until 1899 he was captain of the breastwork monitor HMS Magdala, stationed in Bombay Harbour.

In January 1900 he commissioned the ironclad battleship HMS Howe, port guardship at Queenstown, and on 12 October 1901 he transferred with his crew to the pre-dreadnought battleship HMS Empress of India, which took up the same position at Queenstown, and was flagship to Rear-Admiral Edmund Jeffreys, senior officer, Coast of Ireland Station.

Following the Coronation Fleet Review for King Edward VII in August 1902, Captain Fleet was on 16 September appointed in command of the protected cruiser HMS Aeolus. Less than a year later, he was in May 1903 appointed captain-in-command of the Western Coast Guard District, a new command, and served as such until he retired on account of age in May 1905.

He was promoted to flag rank as rear-admiral, and received the rank of vice-admiral on the retired list.

== Family ==
Fleet married, at St. George's Church in Taunton on 24 October 1887, Alice Mary Elliot, second daughter of W. Franck Elliot, of Osborne House, Taunton.
