= Angus MacLeod (Royal Navy officer) =

Royal Navy Admiral (1847–1920)

Admiral Angus MacLeod CVO
- Born: 11 June 1847
- Died: 29 March 1920 (aged 72); London
- Burial place: Brookwood Cemetery
- Military career
- Allegiance: United Kingdom
- Branch: Royal Navy
- Rank: Admiral
- Commands: HMS Pallas; HMS Gibraltar; HMS Empress of India; HMS Jupiter; Coast of Ireland Station
- Awards: Commander of the Royal Victorian Order

Admiral Angus MacLeod CVO (11 June 1847 – 29 April 1920) was a Royal Navy officer who became Senior Officer, Coast of Ireland Station.

== Naval career ==
McLeod became commanding officer of the cruiser HMS Pallas in June 1891, commanding officer of the cruiser HMS Gibraltar in November 1894, commanding officer of the battleship HMS Empress of India in December 1895 and then commanding officer of the battleship HMS Jupiter in June 1897. He went on to be Captain, Fleet Reserve, Medway in October 1898, Director of Naval Ordnance at the Admiralty in April 1901 and Senior Officer, Coast of Ireland Station in January 1904 before he retired in March 1906.

MacLeod died at 87 Victoria Street in London on 29 April 1920 and was buried at Brookwood Cemetery.

Military offices
Preceded by Edmund Jeffreys	Senior Officer, Coast of Ireland Station; 1904–1906	Succeeded by Sir George King-Hall
