= Royal Sovereign-class battleship =

Class of pre-dreadnoughts of the Royal Navy

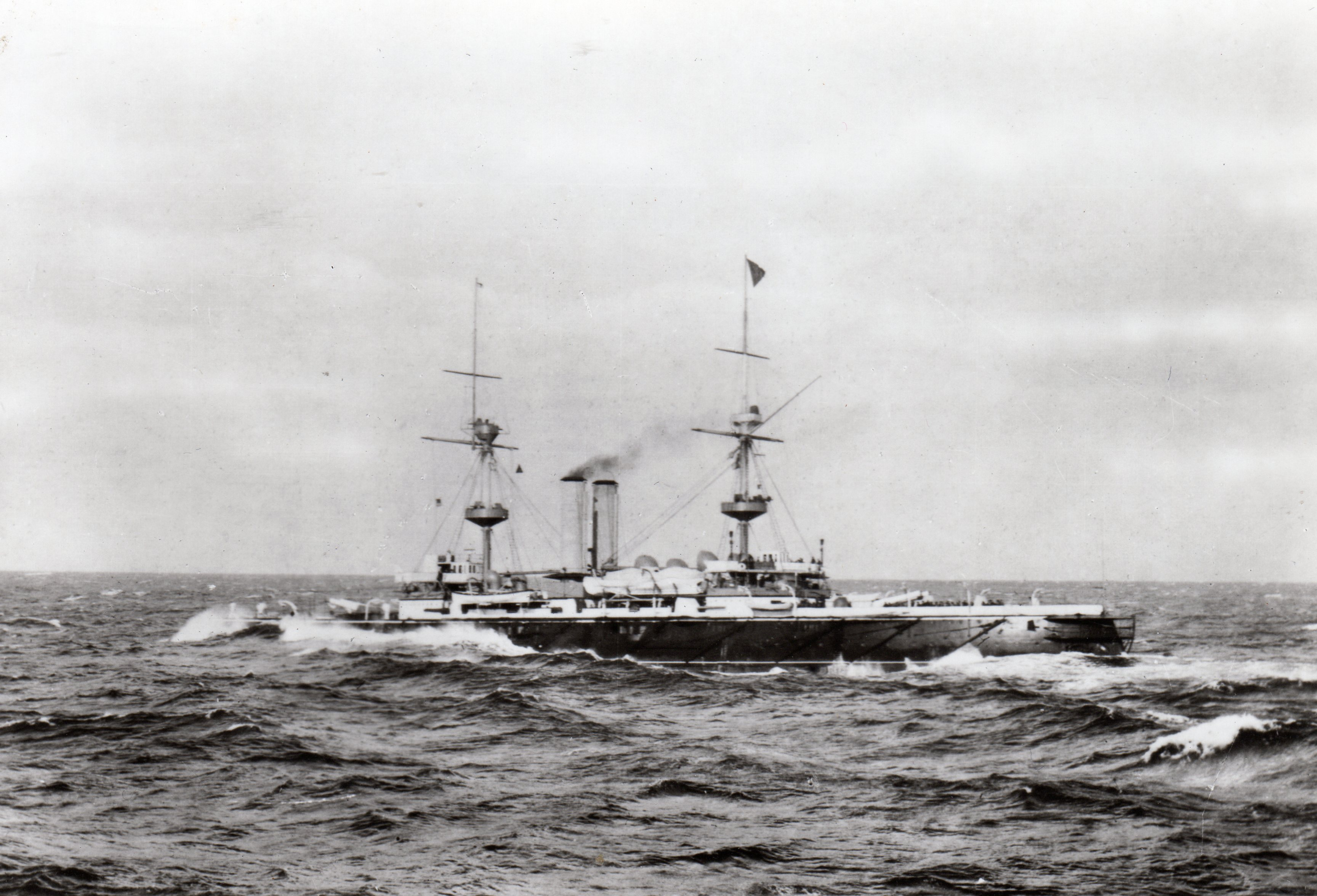
- The high-freeboard Royal Sovereign underway in a moderate sea

Class overview
- Name: Royal Sovereign class
- Builders: Palmers (2); Pembroke Dockyard (2); J & G Thomson (1); Laird Brothers (1); Portsmouth Dockyard (1); Chatham Dockyard (1)
- Operators: Royal Navy
- Preceded by: Trafalgar class
- Succeeded by: Centurion class
- Subclasses: Hood
- Built: 1889–1894
- In commission: 1892–1915
- Completed: 8
- Retired: 2
- Scrapped: 6

General characteristics
- Type: Pre-dreadnought battleship
- Displacement: 14,150 long tons (14,380 t) (normal)
- Length: 380 ft (115.8 m) (pp)
- Beam: 75 ft (22.9 m)
- Draught: 27 ft 6 in (8.4 m)
- Installed power: 11,000 ihp (8,200 kW); 8 cylindrical boilers
- Propulsion: 2 shafts; 2 Triple-expansion steam engines
- Speed: 17.5 knots (32.4 km/h; 20.1 mph)
- Range: 4,720 nmi (8,740 km; 5,430 mi) @ 10 knots (19 km/h; 12 mph)
- Complement: 670–692
- Armament: 2 × twin 13.5 in (343 mm) guns; 10 × single 6 in (152 mm) guns; 10 × single 6 pdr 2.2 in (57 mm) guns; 12 × single 3 pdr 1.9 in (47 mm) guns; 7 × 18 in (450 mm) torpedo tubes
- Armour: Waterline belt: 14–18 in (356–457 mm); Bulkheads: 14–16 in (356–406 mm); Barbettes: 11–17 in (279–432 mm); Casemates: 6 in (152 mm); Conning tower: 12–14 in (305–356 mm); Deck: 2.5–3 in (64–76 mm); Gun turrets: 11–17 in (279–432 mm)

The Royal Sovereign class was a group of eight pre-dreadnought battleships built for the Royal Navy in the 1890s. The ships spent their careers in the Mediterranean, Home and Channel Fleets, sometimes as flagships, although several were mobilised for service with the Flying Squadron in 1896 when tensions with the German Empire were high following the Jameson Raid in South Africa. Three ships were assigned to the International Squadron formed when Greek Christians rebelled against the Ottoman Empire's rule in Crete in 1897–1898.

By about 1905–1907, they were considered obsolete and were reduced to reserve. The ships began to be sold off for scrap beginning in 1911, although Empress of India was sunk as a target ship during gunnery trials in 1913. Hood was fitted with the first anti-torpedo bulges to evaluate underwater protection schemes in 1911 before being scuttled as a blockship a few months after the start of the First World War in August 1914. Only Revenge survived to see active service in the war, during which she bombarded the Belgian coastline. Renamed Redoubtable in 1915, she was hulked later that year as an accommodation ship until she was sold for scrap after the war.

== Background ==
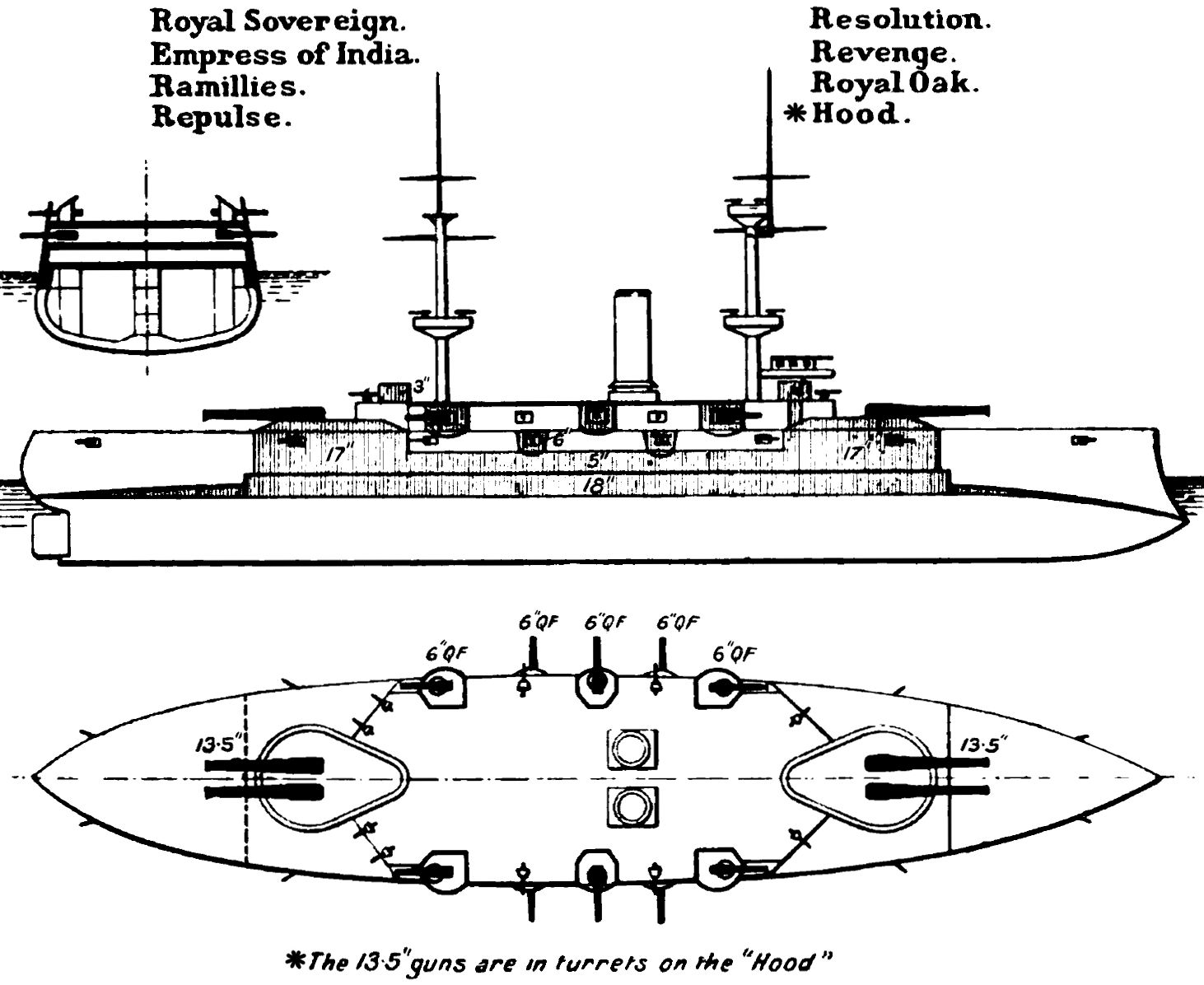
Right elevation, deck plan and hull section as depicted in Brassey's Naval Annual 1906

By the late 1880s pressure on the government to modernise and expand the Royal Navy was building. A war scare with Russia in 1885 during the Panjdeh Incident, the failure of the blockading fleet to contain the raiding ships in port during the 1888 fleet manoeuvres and more realistic evaluations of the numbers of ships required to perform the tasks required in a war against France, coupled with exposés by influential journalists like W. T. Stead, revealed serious weaknesses in the Navy. The Government responded with the Naval Defence Act 1889, which provided £21.5 million for a vast expansion programme of which the eight ships of the Royal Sovereign class were the centrepiece. The Act also formalised the two-power standard, whereby the Royal Navy sought to be as large as the next two major naval powers combined.

Preliminary work on what would become the Royal Sovereigns began in 1888 and the Board of Admiralty directed the Director of Naval Construction, Sir William White, to design an improved and enlarged version of the Trafalgar class. These ships were equipped with gun turrets, the weight of which dictated that they be low-freeboard ships to reduce their topweight. White, however, argued strenuously for a high-freeboard design to improve the new ships' ability to fight and steam in heavy weather. This meant that the armament could only be mounted in lighter, less-heavily armoured barbettes. After much discussion, the board came around to White's view and the design resembled an enlarged version of the earlier Admiral class, although one of the eight ships, Hood, was built as a low-freeboard turret ship in deference to the First Sea Lord, Admiral Sir Arthur Hood, who had strongly argued for the type. The Royal Sovereigns are often considered the first of the type of battleship which would become known after the commissioning of the revolutionary Dreadnought in 1906 as pre-dreadnoughts.

== Design and description ==
The ships displaced 14,150 long tons (14,380 t) at normal load and 15,580 long tons (15,830 t) at deep load. They had a length between perpendiculars of 380 feet (115.8 m) and an overall length of 410 feet 6 inches (125.1 m), a beam of 75 feet (22.9 m), and a draught of 27 feet 6 inches (8.4 m).

Originally, the class was intended to be equipped with a new wire wound, 40 caliber long 12 inch gun. However the ship was instead fitted with 13.5 inch guns, similar to the ones found on the "Admirals" series of ships, as the board required 4 of the heaviest guns available, on the ship.

Those ships fitted with barbettes had a freeboard of 19 feet 6 inches (5.9 m) (about 90% of modern guidelines), provided by the addition of a complete extra deck, which improved their performance in heavy seas. To reduce their topweight, White gave them a significant amount of tumblehome. Hood's freeboard, however, was only 11 feet 3 inches (3.4 m), which meant that she was very wet and lost speed rapidly as wave height increased. She was the last British battleship with the heavy, old-style, turrets and all future British battleships were of a high-freeboard design and had their main armament in barbettes, although the adoption of armoured, rotating gunhouses over the barbettes gradually led to them being called "turrets" as well.

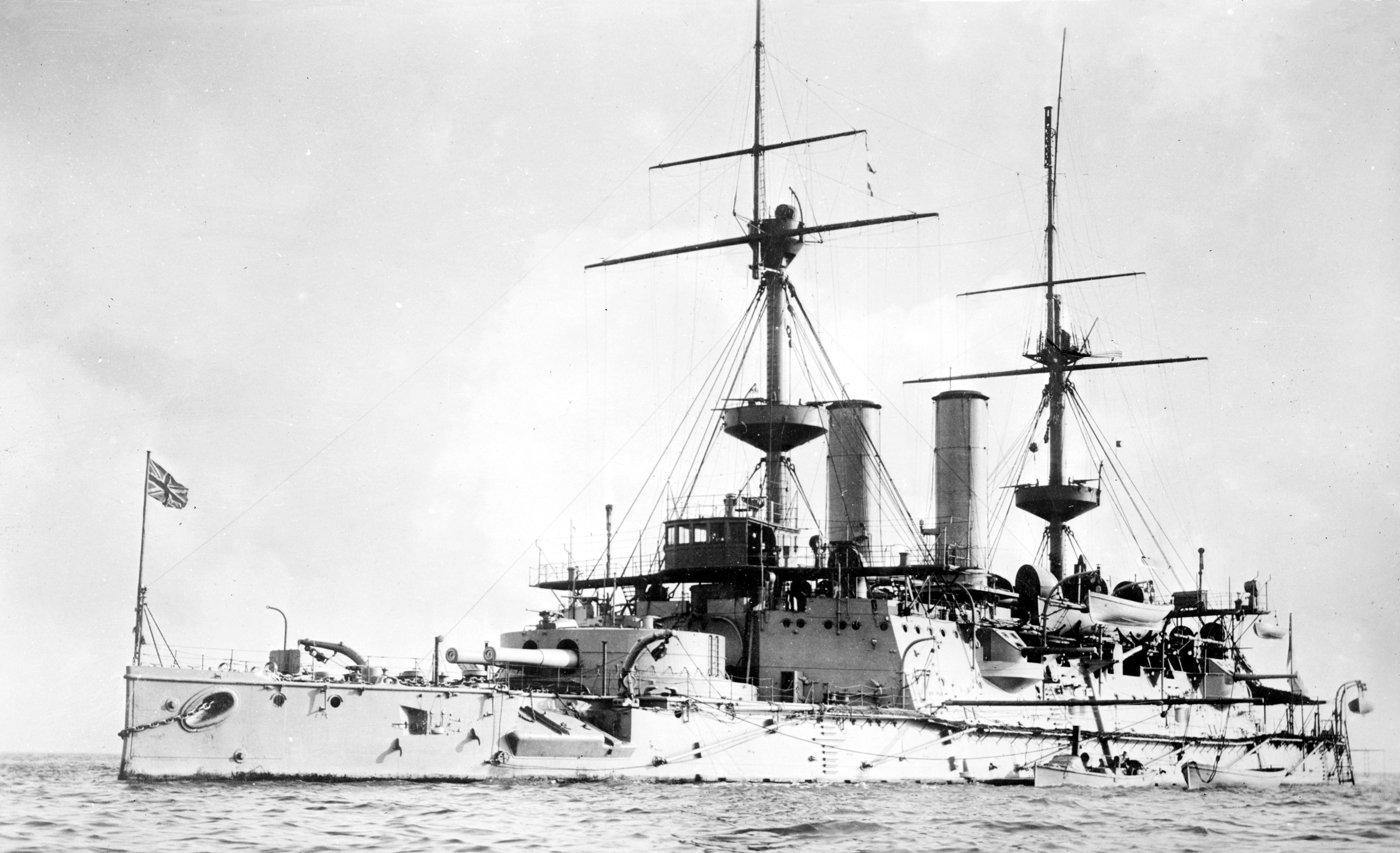
The low-freeboard Hood equipped with turrets

Another issue with Hood was that the stability of a ship is largely due to freeboard at high rolling angles, so she had to be given a larger metacentric height (the vertical distance between the metacentre and the centre of gravity below it) of around 4.1 feet (1.2 m) instead of the 3.6 feet (1.1 m) of the rest of the Royal Sovereigns to make her roll less in rough seas. This had the effect of making her roll period shorter by around 7% compared to her sister ship, which in turn made her gunnery less accurate. White had purposely selected a high metacentric height to minimise rolling and he did not think that bilge keels were needed. When Resolution experienced heavy rolling during a heavy storm in December 1893, which earned the class the nickname Rolling Ressies, her sister, Repulse, was fitted with bilge keels while still fitting out and conclusively demonstrated their effectiveness during comparative trials.

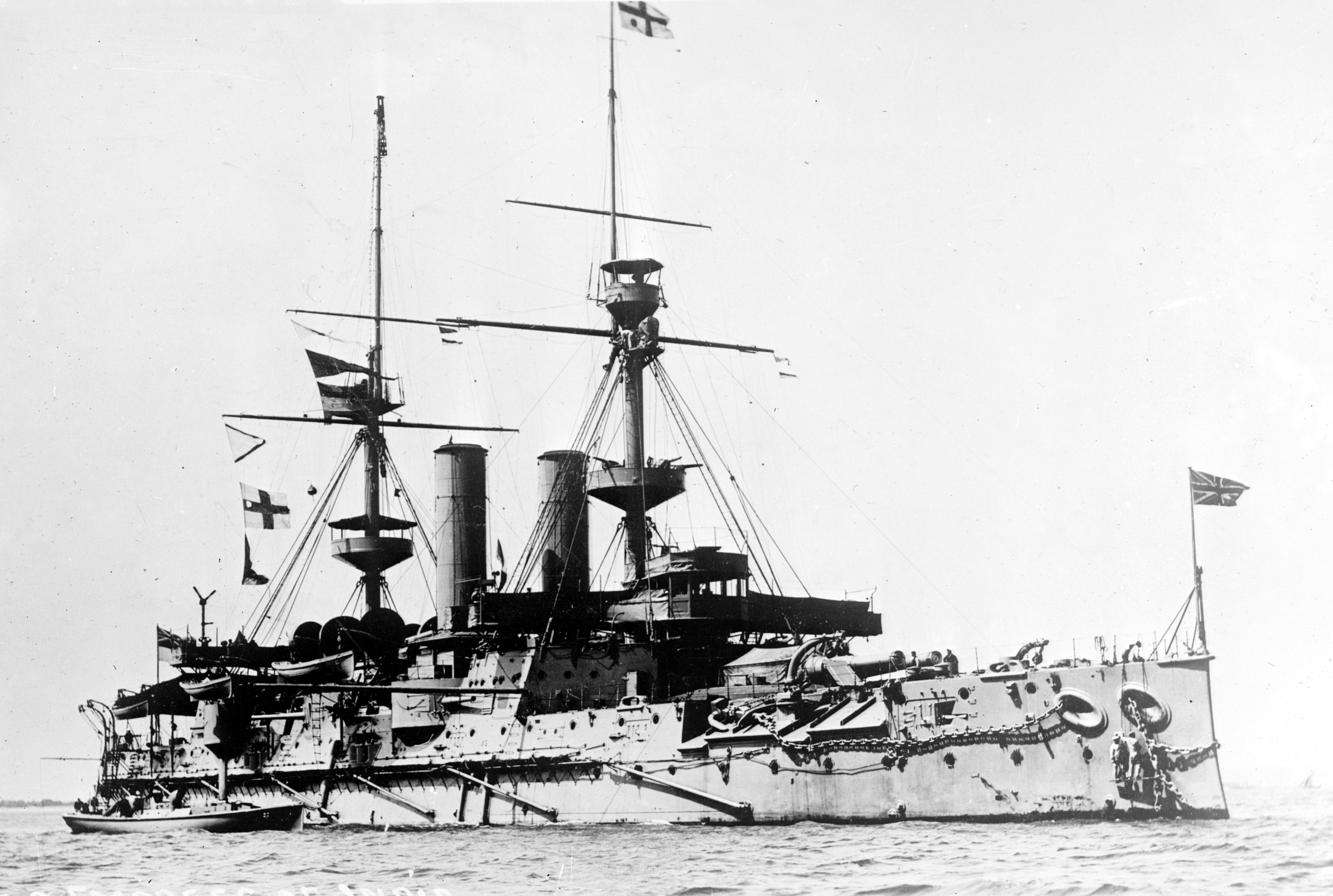
The barbette-equipped Empress of India

The Royal Sovereigns were powered by a pair of three-cylinder, vertical triple-expansion steam engines, each driving one propeller shaft, using steam provided by eight cylindrical boilers that operated at a pressure of 155 psi (1,069 kPa; 11 kgf/cm^{2}). The engines were designed to produce a total of 9,000 indicated horsepower (6,700 kW) at normal draught and a speed of 16 knots (30 km/h; 18 mph); using forced draught, they were expected to produce 11,000 ihp (8,200 kW) and a maximum speed of 17.5 knots (32.4 km/h; 20.1 mph). The Royal Sovereign-class ships comfortably exceeded these speeds; Royal Sovereign herself reached 16.43 knots (30.43 km/h; 18.91 mph) from 9,661 ihp (7,204 kW) with natural draught. Trials at forced draught, however, damaged her boilers, although the ship attained 18 knots (33 km/h; 21 mph) from 13,360 ihp (9,960 kW). As a result, the Navy decided not to push the boilers of the Royal Sovereign class past 11,000 ihp to prevent similar damage. The ships carried a maximum of 1,420 long tons (1,443 t) of coal, which gave them a range of 4,720 nautical miles (8,740 km; 5,430 mi) at a speed of 10 knots (19 km/h; 12 mph).

=== Armament and armour ===
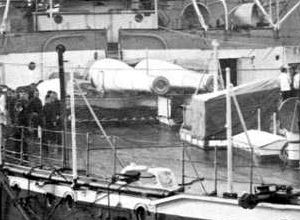
Close up of the aft barbette aboard Empress of India

A new and more powerful 12-inch (305 mm) gun was preferred by the Board, but it was still under development, so the 32-calibre BL 13.5-inch (343 mm) 67-long-ton (68 t) gun used in the preceding classes was chosen. The four guns were mounted in two twin-gun, pear-shaped barbettes or circular turrets, one forward and one aft of the superstructure. The barbettes were open, without hoods or gun shields, and the guns were fully exposed. The ammunition hoists were in the apex of the barbette and the guns had to return to the fore-and-aft position to be reloaded. The 1,250-pound (570 kg) shells fired by these guns were credited with the ability to penetrate 28 inches (711 mm) of wrought iron at 1,000 yards (910 m), using a charge of 630 pounds (290 kg) of smokeless brown cocoa (SBC). At maximum elevation of +13.5°, the guns had a range of around 11,950 yards (10,930 m) with SBC; later a charge of 187 pounds (85 kg) of cordite was substituted for the SBC which extended the range to about 12,620 yards (11,540 m). The ships carried 80 rounds for each gun.

The secondary armament of ten quick-firing (QF) 6-inch (152 mm) guns was a significant upgrade over the six QF 4.7-inch (120 mm) guns of the Trafalgar class. These guns were intended to destroy the unarmoured structure of their opponents and they were widely spaced on two decks so that a single hit would not disable more than one. Four of the guns were situated on the main deck and were only usable in calm weather because they were so close to the ships' waterline, while the remaining guns were above them on the upper deck. Together with their ammunition supply of 200 rounds per gun, the guns weighed about 500 long tons (508 t) and were one of the reasons for the large increase in displacement over the earlier ships. The guns fired their 100-pound (45 kg) shells to a range of 11,400 yards (10,400 m) at their maximum elevation of +20°. Sixteen QF 6-pounder 2.2 in (57 mm) guns of an unknown type and a dozen QF 3-pounder 1.9 in (47 mm) Hotchkiss guns were fitted for defence against torpedo boats (Hood only had eight 6-pounders). The Royal Sovereign-class ships also mounted seven 14-inch (356 mm) torpedo tubes, two submerged and four above water on the broadside, plus one above water in the stern.

The Royal Sovereigns' armour scheme was similar to that of the Trafalgars, as the waterline belt of compound armour only protected the area between the barbettes. The 14–18-inch (356–457 mm) belt was 250 feet (76.2 m) long and had a total height of 8 feet 6 inches (2.6 m) of which 5 feet (1.5 m) was below water. Transverse bulkheads 16 inches (406 mm) (forward) and 14 inches (aft) thick formed the central armoured citadel. Above the belt was a strake of 4-inch (102 mm) armour, backed by deep coal bunkers, that was terminated by 3-inch (76 mm) oblique bulkheads that connected the upper side armour to the barbettes. The plates of the upper strake were Harvey armour only in Royal Sovereign; her sisters had nickel steel, although Hood's plates were 4.375 inches (111 mm) thick.

The barbettes and gun turrets were protected by compound armour, ranging in thickness from 16 to 17 inches (406 to 432 mm) and the casemates for the main deck 6-inch guns had a thickness equal to their diameter. The ammunition hoists to the main deck secondary guns were 2 inches (51 mm) thick while those for the upper deck guns were twice that. The submerged armour deck was 3 inches thick amidships and reduced to 2.5 inches (64 mm) towards the ends of the ship; the forward end curved downwards to reinforce the plough-shaped ram. The walls of the forward conning tower were 12–14 inches (305–356 mm) thick and the communications tube that ran down to the armour deck was 8 inches (203 mm) in thickness. The aft conning tower was protected by 3-inch plates, as was its communication tube. Between 1902 and 1904, the thin gun shields protecting the upper deck 6-inch guns were replaced by armoured casemates in all the ships except Hood, whose lack of stability prevented the addition of such weights high in the ship.

== Modifications ==
Bilge keels were fitted in 1894–1895 to all ships that lacked them. The three-pounder guns in the upper fighting tops were removed from all ships in 1899–1902 as were the gun shields of the guns in the lower fighting tops, except in Empress of India which retained hers until 1903–1904. The above-water torpedo tubes were removed from all ships in 1902–1905 and armoured casemates were fitted to the 6-inch guns on the upper deck between 1902 and 1904. Fire-control equipment and rangefinders were installed in every ship in 1905–1908 and all light guns had been removed from the main deck and the fighting tops by 1909. The after bridge was removed from all but Revenge in 1910. Two years later that ship had her guns relined down to 10 inches (254 mm) for testing; the liners were removed in October 1912.

After the start of the First World War, Revenge was modified for coast bombardment duties. To extend the range of her guns, they were relined down to 12 inches (305 mm). The following year, she had anti-torpedo bulges fitted.

== Ships ==
Construction data
Ship	Builder	Laid down	Launched	Completed	Cost (including armament)
Royal Sovereign	Portsmouth Dockyard	30 September 1889	26 February 1891	May 1892	£913,986
Empress of India	Pembroke Dockyard	9 July 1889	7 May 1891	11 September 1893	£912,162
Repulse	Pembroke Dockyard	1 January 1890	27 February 1892	25 April 1894	£915,302
Hood	Chatham Dockyard	12 August 1889	30 July 1891	May 1893	£926,396
Ramillies	J & G Thomson, Clydebank	11 August 1890	1 March 1892	17 October 1893	£980,895
Resolution	Palmers, Jarrow	14 June 1890	28 May 1892	5 December 1893	£953,817
Revenge	Palmers, Jarrow	12 February 1891	3 November 1892	22 March 1894	£954,825
Royal Oak	Laird Brothers, Birkenhead	29 May 1890	5 November 1892	12 June 1894	£977,996

== Operational history ==
Royal Sovereign, Repulse, Resolution and Empress of India were initially assigned to the Channel Fleet, with Royal Sovereign serving as the fleet flagship and the latter ship as the flagship of the second-in-command. Revenge and Royal Oak were commissioned into the Flying Squadron in 1896 when tensions with the German Empire were high following the Jameson Raid in South Africa, with the former as the flagship. Ramillies became flagship of the Mediterranean Fleet and was joined by Hood. All of the Channel Fleet ships participated in Queen Victoria's Diamond Jubilee fleet review in 1897. Empress of India and Royal Sovereign were transferred to the Mediterranean shortly after the review although only the former ship joined Ramillies and Hood as part of the International Squadron, a multinational force that intervened in the 1897–1898 Greek Christian uprising against the Ottoman Empire's rule in Crete.

Beginning in 1900 those ships deployed in the Mediterranean, except for Hood, began returning home and often served as a coastguard or guard ship before beginning a long refit in 1902–1903. Empress of India was the first of the sisters to be refitted and was the only ship of the class present at King Edward VII's Coronation Fleet Review in August 1902. The ship served as the flagship of the Home Fleet's second-in-command after her refit until she was relieved by Royal Oak in 1904. Revenge was the second ship to complete her refit and was the flagship of the Home Fleet until 1905. Most of the sisters were placed in reserve after the completion of their refit, although they usually participated in the annual fleet manoeuvres.

Resolution was the first ship of the class to be placed in reserve in June 1904. Royal Sovereign, Ramillies, Repulse, Revenge, Royal Oak and Empress of India followed in 1905. The latter ship accidentally collided with the submarine HMS A10 the following year. With the exception of Revenge, they were all taken out of service in 1909–1912 and Empress of India was sunk as a target ship in 1913. Royal Sovereign and Ramillies were sold for scrap in October 1913, having been preceded by Repulse in July 1911 and followed by Royal Oak in January 1914 and Resolution in April.

Hood served most of her active career with the Mediterranean Fleet, where her low freeboard was less of a disadvantage. The ship was briefly placed in reserve in 1900 and became a guard ship the following year. She returned to the Mediterranean at the end of 1901, but only remained there for a year before returning to Chatham Dockyard for a refit. Hood was assigned to the Home Fleet upon its completion in mid-1903 and was reduced to reserve in early 1905. Four years later she became the receiving ship at Queenstown, Ireland. Hood was used in the development of anti-torpedo bulges in 1911–1913 and was scuttled in late 1914 to act as a blockship across the southern entrance of Portland Harbour.

Revenge was recommissioned in 1906 as a gunnery training ship until she was paid off in 1913. She was recommissioned the following year, after the start of the First World War, to bombard the coast of Flanders as part of the Dover Patrol, during which she was hit four times, but was not seriously damaged. She had anti-torpedo bulges fitted in early 1915, the first ship to be fitted with them operationally. Later that year the ship was renamed Redoubtable to release her name for use by the new battleship Revenge and was refitted as an accommodation ship by the end of the year. The last surviving member of her class, the ship was sold for scrap in November 1919.
