= George King-Hall =

Royal Navy Admiral; Commander in Chief, Australia Station (1850–1939)

Admiral Sir George King-Hall KCB CVO
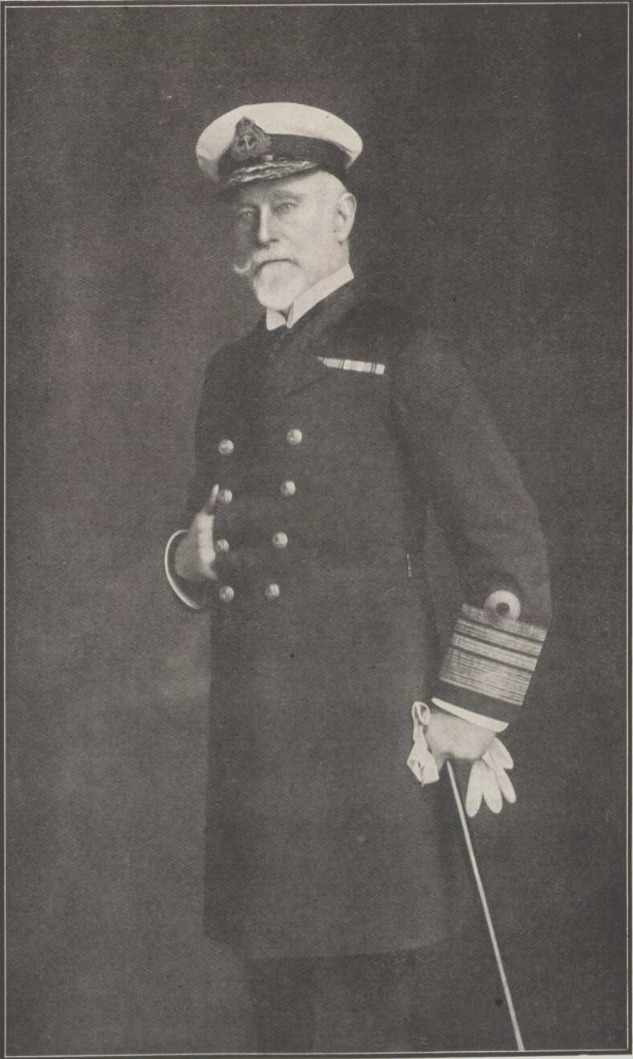
- Born: 14 August 1850; Weymouth, Dorset, England
- Died: 10 September 1939 (aged 89) London, England
- Allegiance: United Kingdom
- Branch: Royal Navy
- Rank: Admiral
- Commands: Australia Station
- Awards: Knight Commander of the Order of the Bath; Commander of the Royal Victorian Order

Admiral Sir George Fowler King-Hall KCB CVO (14 August 1850 – 10 September 1939) was a senior officer of the Royal Navy. He was the Royal Navy's last Commander-in-Chief, Australia Station.

== Early life ==
King-Hall was born on 14 August 1850 as the second surviving son of Admiral William King-Hall and Louisa Forman. His younger brother was Admiral Sir Herbert King-Hall.

== Military career ==
He joined the Royal Navy as a cadet in 1864 and during his time as a midshipman served aboard HMS Challenger from 1866 to 1867.

King-Hall was promoted to commander in 1885, and was captain of the sloop HMS Penguin from 1877 to 1889, during which time the ship was responsible for securing the Maldives as a British protectorate, and acted against slave traders in eastern African waters.

In 1891, during his time in command of HMS Melita, King-Hall supervised the salvaging of the French warship Seiguelay, which had run aground off Jaffa. From December 1899 until March 1900, he was in command of the battleship HMS Revenge, on the Mediterranean station.

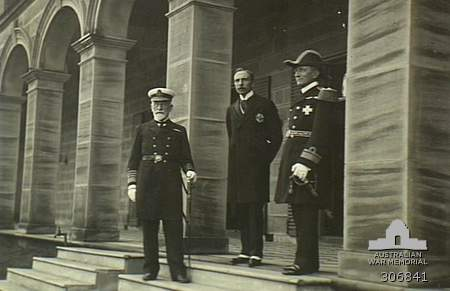
Admiral Sir George King-Hall (left) and Rear Admiral Sir George Patey (right) being received by the Governor General Lord Denham on the steps of Admiralty House, 4 October 1913

From March 1900 to 1902, King-Hall served as Chief of Staff to Sir John Fisher during the latter's time as Commander in Chief of the Mediterranean Station, based on HMS Renown. On 1 October 1902 he was posted to the battleship HMS Revenge, flagship of the Admiral Superintendent, Naval Reserves, where he served as assistant to the Admiral. He was the Senior Officer, Coast of Ireland Station, from 1906 to 1908.

King-Hall was later promoted to flag rank, and in 1911, was assigned as Commander in Chief of the Australia Station. During his two years in command, King-Hall helped to generate public support for the fledgling Royal Australian Navy (RAN), and to prepare the RAN for the 1913 transfer of responsibility for Australia's naval defence. King-Hall concluded his duties in Australia in October 1913, after which the office of Commander of the Australia Station was made redundant by the RAN position of Rear Admiral Commanding HM Australian Fleet. He was knighted KCB in the 1911 Coronation Honours.

== Later life ==
King-Hall retired shortly after returning to England. He died on 13 September 1939.

He fathered two sons and two daughters. His eldest son was Stephen King-Hall, who served in the Royal Navy before becoming a politician. His daughters, Magdalen King-Hall and Louisa "Lou" King-Hall, were writers.

Military offices
| Preceded by Angus MacLeod | Senior Officer, Coast of Ireland Station; 1906–1908 | Succeeded by Sir Alfred Paget |
| Preceded by Sir Richard Poore | Commander-in-Chief, Australia Station; 1910–1913 | Succeeded by Post Disbanded |
