= HMS A10 =

Submarine of the Royal Navy

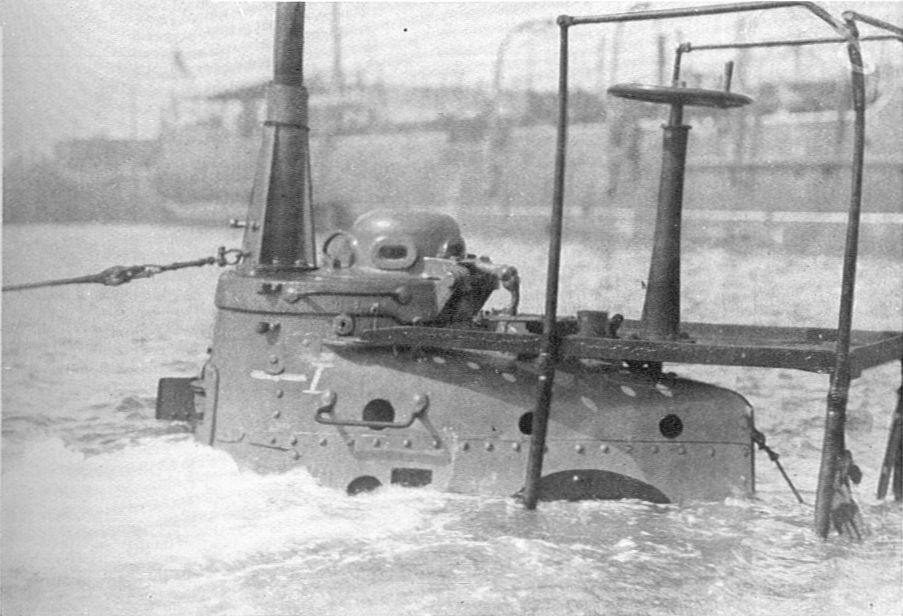
- HMS A10, conning tower awash

History

United Kingdom
- Name: A10
- Builder: Vickers, Sons & Maxim Ltd. Barrow-in-Furness
- Laid down: 1903
- Launched: 8 February 1905
- Commissioned: 3 June 1905
- Fate: Sold for scrap, 1 April 1919 to Ardrossan Drydock Co., Ardrossan, Scotland

General characteristics
- Class & type: A-class submarine
- Displacement: 190 long tons (193 t) surfaced; 206 long tons (209 t) submerged
- Length: 105 ft (32.0 m)
- Beam: 12 ft 9 in (3.9 m)
- Draught: 10 ft 8 in (3.3 m)
- Installed power: 600 bhp (450 kW) (petrol engine); 150 hp (110 kW) (electric motor)
- Propulsion: 1 × 16-cylinder Wolseley petrol engine; 1 × electric motor
- Speed: 11 knots (20 km/h; 13 mph) surfaced; 6 knots (11 km/h; 6.9 mph) submerged
- Range: 500 nautical miles (930 km; 580 mi) at 10 kn (19 km/h; 12 mph) surfaced
- Complement: 2 officers and 9 ratings
- Armament: 2 × 18-inch (45 cm) torpedo tubes

HMS A10 was an A-class submarine built for the Royal Navy in the first decade of the 20th century. After surviving World War I, she was sold for scrap in 1919.

== Design and description ==
A10 was a member of the first British class of submarines, although slightly larger, faster and more heavily armed than the lead ship, HMS A1. The submarine had a length of 105 feet 1 inch (32.0 m) overall, a beam of 12 feet 9 inches (3.9 m) and a mean draught of 10 feet 8 inches (3.3 m). They displaced 190 long tons (190 t) on the surface and 206 long tons (209 t) submerged. The A-class submarines had a crew of 2 officers and 9 ratings.

For surface running, the boats were powered by a single 16-cylinder 600-brake-horsepower (447 kW) Wolseley petrol engine that drove one propeller shaft. When submerged the propeller was driven by a 150-horsepower (112 kW) electric motor. They could reach 11 knots (20 km/h; 13 mph) on the surface and 6 knots (11 km/h; 6.9 mph) underwater. On the surface, A10 had a range of 500 nautical miles (930 km; 580 mi) at 10 knots (19 km/h; 12 mph); submerged the boat had a range of 30 nautical miles (56 km; 35 mi) at 5 knots (9.3 km/h; 5.8 mph).

The boats were armed with two 18-inch (45 cm) torpedo tubes in the bow. They could carry a pair of reload torpedoes, but generally did not as their weight had to be compensated for by an equivalent weight of fuel.

== Construction and career ==
A10 was ordered as part of the 1903–04 Naval Programme from Vickers. She was laid down at their shipyard in Barrow-in-Furness in 1903, launched on 8 February 1905 and completed on 3 June 1905. She collided with the battleship HMS Empress of India in Plymouth Sound on 30 April 1906.

A10 was sold for scrap to the Ardrossan Drydock Company of Ardrossan, Scotland, on 1 April 1919 .
