= Edmund Jeffreys =

Royal Navy Admiral (1846–1925)

Admiral Edmund Jeffreys CVO
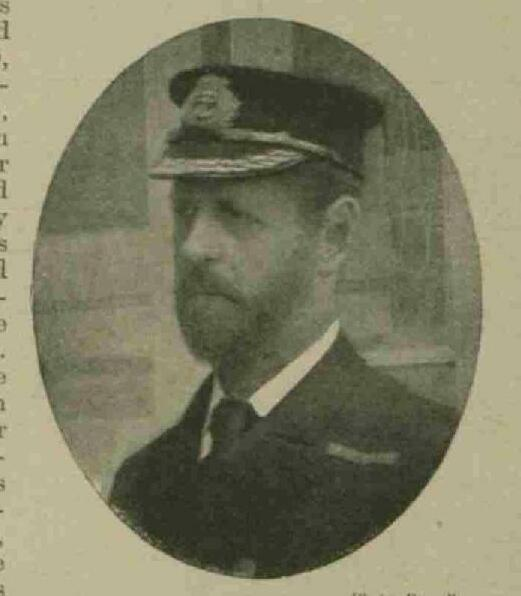
- Born: 1 October 1846
- Died: 19 March 1925 (aged 78)
- Military career
- Allegiance: United Kingdom
- Branch: Royal Navy
- Rank: Admiral
- Commands: HMS Mercury; HMS Hood; HMS Excellent; Coast of Ireland Station
- Awards: Commander of the Royal Victorian Order

Admiral Edmund Frederick Jeffreys, CVO (1 October 1846 – 19 March 1925) was a Royal Navy officer who became Senior Officer, Coast of Ireland Station.

== Naval career ==
Jeffreys became commanding officer of the cruiser HMS Mercury in July 1888 and commanding officer of the battleship HMS Hood in June 1893. He went on to be commanding officer of the Gunnery School HMS Excellent in November 1895, Director of Naval Ordnance at the Admiralty in August 1897 and Senior Officer, Coast of Ireland Station in February 1901. The Senior Officer was based at Queenstown, and had the port guard ship there as his flagship. He hoisted his flag in HMS Empress of India on 13 October 1901, and transferred to HMS Aeolus in late September 1902.

He retired in January 1904.

Military offices
| Preceded by Atwell Lake | Senior Officer, Coast of Ireland Station; 1901–1904 | Succeeded by Angus MacLeod |
