= HMS Empress of India =

1893 Royal Sovereign-class battleship

Coordinates: 50°29′42″N 2°57′54″W

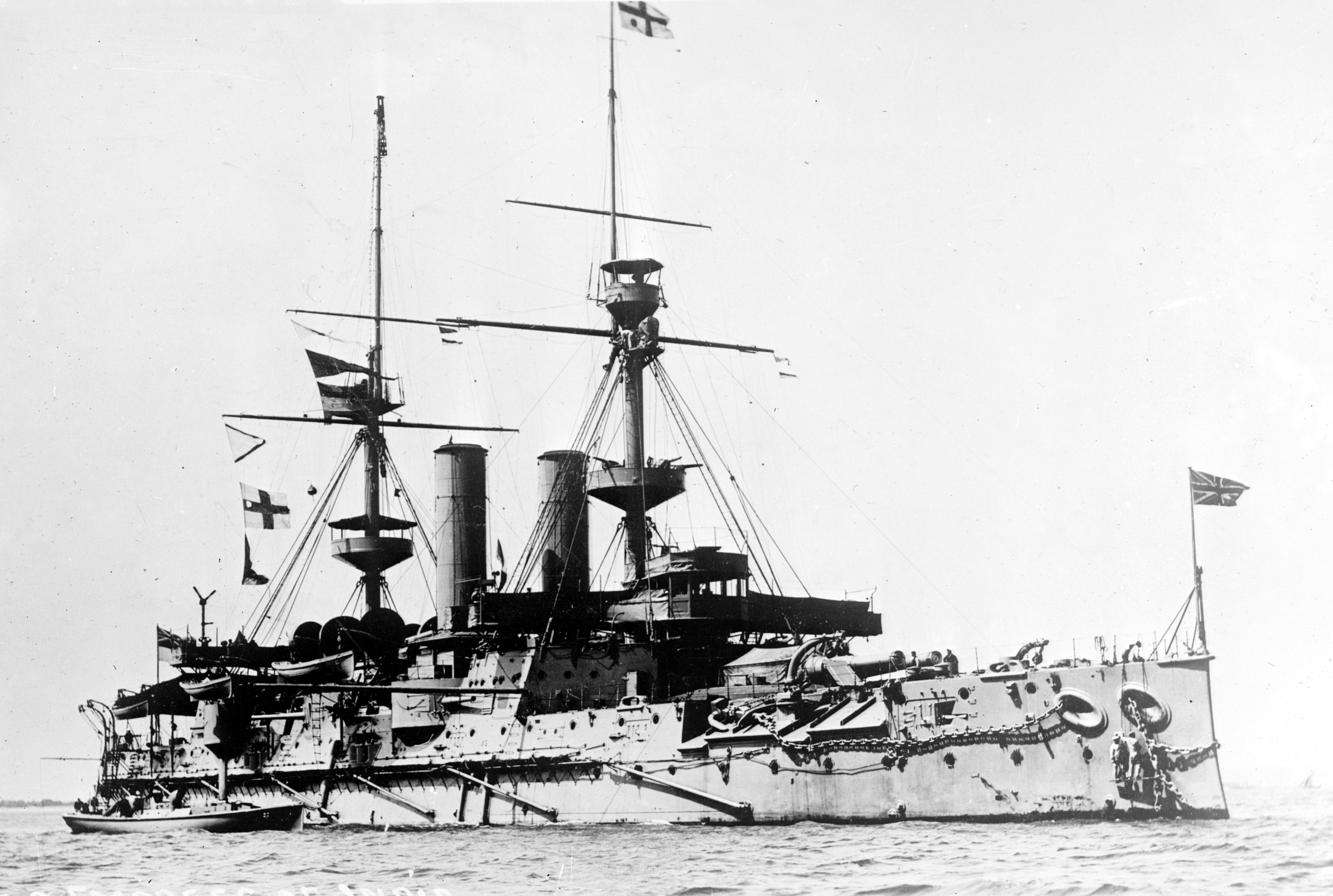
- Empress of India at anchor, 1906

History

United Kingdom
- Name: HMS Empress of India
- Namesake: Regnal title of Queen Victoria
- Ordered: 1889 Naval Programme
- Builder: Pembroke Dockyard
- Cost: £912,612
- Laid down: 9 July 1889
- Launched: 7 May 1891
- Completed: August 1893
- Commissioned: 11 September 1893
- Out of service: Early 1912
- Fate: Sunk as target, 4 November 1913

General characteristics (as built)
- Class & type: Royal Sovereign-class predreadnought battleship
- Displacement: 14,150 long tons (14,380 t) (normal)
- Length: 380 ft (115.8 m) (pp)
- Beam: 75 ft (22.9 m)
- Draught: 27 ft 6 in (8.4 m)
- Installed power: 11,000 ihp (8,200 kW); 8 cylindrical boilers
- Propulsion: 2 shafts; 2 Triple-expansion steam engines
- Speed: 17.5 knots (32.4 km/h; 20.1 mph)
- Range: 4,720 nmi (8,740 km; 5,430 mi) @ 10 knots (19 km/h; 12 mph)
- Complement: 692 (as flagship, 1903)
- Armament: 2 × twin 13.5 in (343 mm) guns; 10 × single 6 in (152 mm) guns; 10 × single 6-pdr (57 mm (2.2 in)) guns; 12 × single 3-pdr (47 mm (1.9 in)) guns; 7 × 18-inch (450 mm) torpedo tubes
- Armour: Main belt: 14–18 in (356–457 mm); bulkheads: 14–16 in (356–406 mm); Barbettes: 11–17 in (279–432 mm); Casemates: 6 in (152 mm); Conning tower: 14 in (356 mm); Deck: 2.5–3 in (64–76 mm)

HMS Empress of India was one of seven Royal Sovereign-class pre-dreadnought battleships built for the Royal Navy during the 1890s. The ship was commissioned in 1893 and served as the flagship of the second-in-command of the Channel Fleet for two years. She was transferred to the Mediterranean Fleet in 1897, during which time Empress of India was assigned to the International Squadron blockading Crete during the uprising there. She returned home in 1901 and was briefly assigned as a coast guard ship in Ireland before she became the second flagship of the Home Fleet. The ship was reduced to reserve in 1905 and accidentally collided with the submarine HMS A10 the following year. Empress of India was taken out of service in early 1912 and accidentally struck a German sailing ship while under tow. She was sunk as a target ship in 1913.

== Design and description ==
The design of the Royal Sovereign-class ships was derived from that of the Admiral-class ironclad battleships, greatly enlarged to improve seakeeping and to provide space for a secondary armament as in the preceding Trafalgar-class ironclad battleships. The ships displaced 14,150 long tons (14,380 t) at normal load and 15,580 long tons (15,830 t) at deep load. They had a length between perpendiculars of 380 feet (115.8 m) and an overall length of 410 feet 6 inches (125.1 m), a beam of 75 feet (22.9 m), and a draught of 27 feet 6 inches (8.4 m). As a flagship, Empress of India's crew consisted of 692 officers and ratings in 1903.

=== Propulsion ===
The Royal Sovereigns were powered by a pair of three-cylinder, vertical triple-expansion steam engines, each driving one shaft. Their Humphrys & Tennant engines were designed to produce a total of 11,000 indicated horsepower (8,200 kW) and a maximum speed of 17.5 knots (32.4 km/h; 20.1 mph) using steam provided by eight cylindrical boilers with forced draught. The ships carried a maximum of 1,420 long tons (1,443 t) of coal which gave them a range of 4,720 nautical miles (8,740 km; 5,430 mi) at a speed of 10 knots (19 km/h; 12 mph).

=== Armament ===
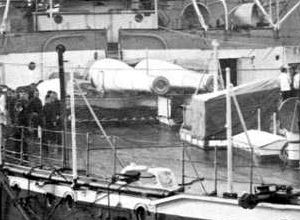
Empress of India's stern 13.5-inch (343-mm) gun barbette while she was in drydock at Chatham Dockyard in the 1890s

Their main armament consisted of four breech-loading (BL) 13.5-inch (343 mm) guns mounted in two twin-gun barbettes, one each fore and aft of the superstructure. Each gun was provided with 80 rounds. Their secondary armament consisted of ten quick-firing (QF) 6-inch (152 mm) guns. 200 rounds per gun were carried by the ships. Sixteen QF 6-pounder (2.2 in (57 mm)) guns of an unknown type and a dozen QF 3-pounder (1.9 in (47 mm)) Hotchkiss guns were fitted for defence against torpedo boats. The two 3-pounders in the upper fighting top were removed in 1903–04 and all of the remaining light guns from the lower fighting tops and main deck followed in 1905–09. The Royal Sovereign-class ships mounted seven 14-inch (356 mm) torpedo tubes, although Empress of India had four of hers removed in 1902.

=== Armour ===
The Royal Sovereigns' armour scheme was similar to that of the Trafalgars, as the waterline belt of compound armour only protected the area between the barbettes. The 14–18-inch (356–457 mm) belt and transverse bulkheads 14–16 inches (356–406 mm) thick closed off the ends of the belt. Above the belt was a strake of 4-inch (102 mm) nickel-steel armour closed off by 3-inch (76 mm) transverse bulkheads. The barbettes were protected by compound armour, ranging in thickness from 11 to 17 inches (279 to 432 mm) and the casemates for the 6-inch guns had a thickness equal to their diameter. The thicknesses of the armour deck ranged from 2.5 to 3 inches (64 to 76 mm). The walls of the forward conning tower were 12–14 inches (305–356 mm) thick and the aft conning tower was protected by 3-inch plates.

== Construction and career ==
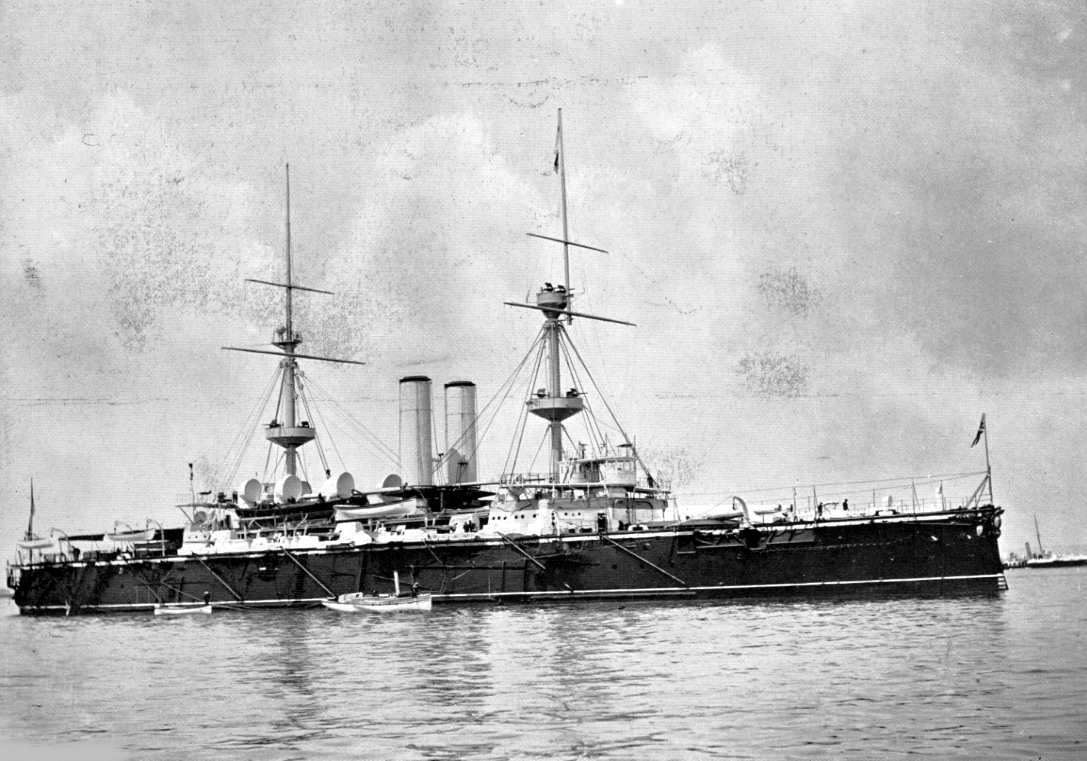
Empress of India at anchor, about 1897

HMS Empress of India, named after a regnal title of Queen Victoria, was the first ship of her name to serve in the Royal Navy. She was ordered under the Naval Defence Act Programme of 1889 with the name of Renown and was laid down on 9 July 1889 at Pembroke Dockyard. The ship was renamed before she was launched on 7 May 1891 by Louise Margaret, Duchess of Connaught and Strathearn. One man was killed when a cable snapped the following day. The ship was then transferred to Chatham Dockyard, where she was completed in August 1893, at a cost of £912,612.

Empress of India was commissioned at Chatham on 11 September 1893 to relieve the ironclad battleship Anson as the flagship of the second-in-command of the Channel Fleet. She participated in annual manoeuvres in the Irish Sea and English Channel as a unit of the "Blue Fleet", 2–5 August 1894. Sometime during the year, the ship was fitted with bilge keels to reduce her rolling. In June 1895, Empress of India was among the ships representing the Royal Navy at the opening of the Kaiser Wilhelm Canal in Germany. That summer, the ship again took part in annual manoeuvres, held from 24 July to 30 August 1895. She became a private ship in December 1895 and was paid off at Chatham on 7 June 1897. The following day, Empress of India recommissioned for service with the Mediterranean Fleet. Before departing, she took part in the Fleet Review for the Diamond Jubilee of Queen Victoria at Spithead on 26 June 1897.

The ship arrived at Malta to begin her Mediterranean service in August 1897. In August and September 1898, she was part of the International Squadron, a multinational force made up of ships of the Austro-Hungarian Navy, French Navy, Imperial German Navy, Italian Royal Navy (Regia Marina), Imperial Russian Navy, and Royal Navy that intervened in the 1897-1898 Greek Christian uprising against the Ottoman Empire′s rule in Crete.

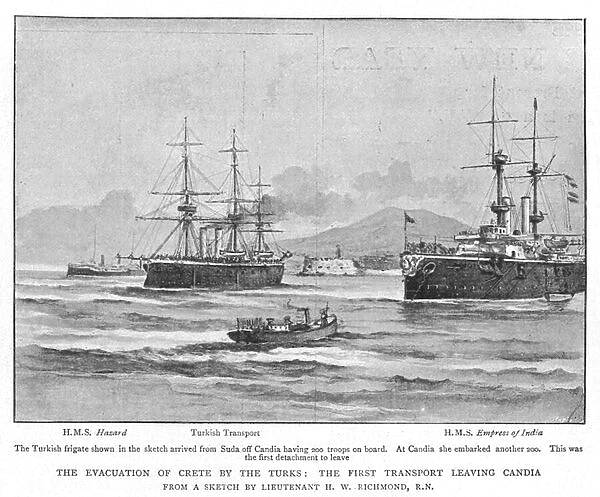
The evacuation of Crete by the Turks, the first Transport leaving Candia. The Graphic 1898

She also was in Cretan waters on 6 November 1898, when members of her crew joined crewmen from the British battleship HMS Revenge in supervising the embarkation on the British torpedo gunboat HMS Hussar of the last Ottoman forces on Crete, which Hussar transported to Salonica. Their departure marked the end of 229 years of Ottoman occupation of Crete.

Captain Henry Hart Dyke was appointed in command in June 1899, and was succeeded by Captain John Ferris on 23 October 1900. The ship was relieved by the battleship Implacable on 14 September 1901 and departed Gibraltar homebound in early October. On 12 October, Empress of India paid off at Devonport, but she recommissioned the next day under the command of Captain Henry Louis Fleet, to relieve the ironclad battleship Howe at Queenstown, Ireland, as both the coast guard ship there and as flagship to Rear-Admiral Edmund Jeffreys, Senior Naval Officer, Coast of Ireland Station. The ship began an extensive refit at Plymouth in early March 1902. During this refit her upper deck six-inch guns received casemates to improve their protection.

Empress of India was assigned to the Home Fleet on 7 May 1902, in which she served as flagship in port and as flagship of the second-in-command when the fleet was at sea. The ship participated in the Coronation Fleet Review for King Edward VII held at Spithead on 16 August 1902, and was back in Ireland later that month when she received the Imperial Japanese Navy armored cruiser Asama and protected cruiser Takasago at Cork. Captain Cecil Burney was appointed in command on 16 September, as flag captain to the second-in-command of the Home Fleet (Rear-Admiral George Atkinson-Willes), who transferred his flag to the ship on the same day. She was assigned as flag ship of the Home Squadron, which was at the time the permanent sea-going nucleus of the Home Fleet. Empress of India served as flagship of "B Fleet" during combined manoeuvres of the Home Fleet, Mediterranean Fleet, and Channel Fleet off Portugal from 5 August to 9 August 1903, but her port engine broke down for 14 hours and the fleet had to leave her behind. Her sister ship Royal Oak relieved her as flagship of the second-in-command of the Home Fleet on 1 June 1904, and she became a private ship in the Home Fleet. The battleship Hannibal relieved her on 22 February 1905, and the ship paid off the next day.

That same day, Empress of India recommissioned in reserve at Devonport and relieved the battleship Barfleur as flagship of the new Fleet in Commission in Reserve at Home. In July 1905 she participated in Reserve Fleet manoeuvres. In September 1905, the protected cruiser Aeolus relieved her of her duties, but she recommissioned on 31 October 1905 with a new nucleus crew to resume her Reserve Fleet duties. She then underwent a refit that lasted into 1906. Empress of India collided with the submarine A10 in Plymouth Sound on 30 April 1906.

When the Reserve Fleet was abolished in February 1907 and became the Home Fleet, Empress of India continued her service as flagship, but now for the Rear-Admiral, Devonport Division. On 25 May she was relieved as flagship by the protected cruiser Niobe. Three days later, the ship recommissioned as a special service vessel. Empress of India relieved her sister ship Royal Oak as parent ship of the special service vessels in November 1911. On 2 March, the ship left Portsmouth under tow by the armoured cruiser Warrior, en route to the Motherbank, where she was to be laid up, but she collided with the German barque Winderhudder en route and had to return to Portsmouth for repairs. She finally arrived at the Motherbank two months later and was laid up, awaiting disposal.

== Sinking ==
On 4 November 1913, Empress of India was used as a target ship in firing trials in Lyme Bay that were primarily intended to give officers and men an idea of the effect of live shell against a real target. A secondary objective was to look at the problems caused by several ships firing at the same target at the same time. The first ship to engage the stationary Empress of India was the light cruiser Liverpool, followed by two dreadnought battleships Thunderer and Orion and the predreadnought battleship King Edward VII, and finally the four dreadnoughts Neptune, King George V, Thunderer, and Vanguard. By 16:45, "Empress of India was blazing furiously and down by the stern, sinking at" 18:30. She had received forty-four 12-inch (305-mm) and 13.5-inch (343-mm) hits and "it is not surprising that an elderly ship sank," though the intention had been to repeat the firing at longer range before she did.

When Empress of India sank, she settled upside-down on the seabed, and some salvage was soon carried out by a Jersey company which owned the rights to the vessel. A big hole in her side was made not by a shell, but by salvage divers removing a condenser. The wreck is accessible and is a deep dive for recreational divers.

Details of the firing are given in the table below. The sinking is also referenced in the Elvis Costello song "Veronica".

Ship firing	Type of ship	Range	Firing order	Ammunition	Fired	Hits
Liverpool	Light cruiser	4,750 yd (4,340 m)	First	6-inch HE shell	16	7
Liverpool	Light cruiser	4,750 yd (4,340 m)	First	4-inch (102 mm) HE shell	66	22
Thunderer; Orion	Dreadnought battleship	9,800 yd (9,000 m)	Second	13.5-inch common shell	40	17
King Edward VII	Predreadnought battleship	9,800 yd (9,000 m)	Second	12-inch common shell	16	5
King Edward VII	Predreadnought battleship	9,800 yd (9,000 m)	Second	9.2-inch (234 mm) common shell	18	7
King Edward VII	Predreadnought battleship	9,800 yd (9,000 m)	Second	6-inch common shell	27	5
Neptune; King George V Thunderer; Vanguard	Dreadnought battleships	8,000–10,000 yd (7,300–9,100 m)	Third	13.5-inch and 12-inch common shell	95	22
