= The Ballad of the "Clampherdown" =

1892 satirical poem written by Rudyard Kipling

"The Ballad of the 'Clampherdown'" is a satirical poem written by Rudyard Kipling in 1892.

The poem describes an engagement between the Clampherdown, a fictional Royal Navy battleship, and a light cruiser of indeterminate origin; she is described as "of the ancient foe", and carrying "a dainty Hotchkiss gun", which implies the French Navy. After the Clampherdown's guns fail to sink the cruiser, and she drifts aimlessly being shelled, she collides with the cruiser, and her crew "out cutlasses, and board!" the enemy.

It was inspired by a letter written to the St James's Gazette, whose author "seemed to believe that naval warfare of the future would be conducted on the old Nelsonic battle lines, including boarding, etc.", to quote Kipling's explanation. He wrote the poem as a deliberate humorous play on this idea; however, to his surprise, it was taken quite seriously and published. Whilst boarding did never return as a major part of naval warfare, it did occur occasionally. The last major boarding action by the Royal Navy was the Altmark incident, in 1940.

The Clampherdown is described in some detail in the poem, allowing some comparison to be made to real vessels. Whilst the name is similar to HMS Camperdown, the physical description—"one bow-gun of a hundred ton / and a great stern-gun beside"—is closer to that of her sister ship Benbow, which was built with an experimental armament. Both were Admiral-class battleships, pre-dreadnoughts launched in the 1880s. The 16.25-inch guns of Benbow, the largest and most powerful then fitted to a Royal Navy battleship, were not greatly successful in service; they took four or five minutes to load and fire, the barrels only had a life of 75 rounds, and the muzzles tended to droop. The ships of this class were only partially armoured, with the bow and stern being lightly protected, and had low freeboard; these factors are noted and reflected in the text. In 1892, Benbow had recently been removed from active service and was serving as a guard ship at Greenock; the defects in her design would have been clear by this point.
