= Victoria-class ironclad =

British warship class (1890–1907)

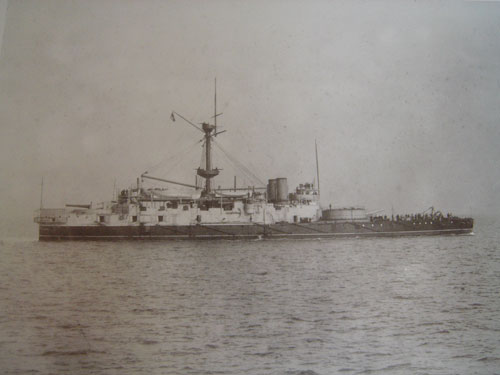
- HMS Victoria

Class overview
- Builders: Armstrong, Mitchell & Co.; Thames Ironworks
- Preceded by: Admiral class
- Succeeded by: Trafalgar class
- In commission: 1890–1907
- Completed: 2
- Lost: 1

General characteristics
- Displacement: 11,020 tons (11,200 t)
- Length: 340 ft (100 m)
- Beam: 70 ft (21 m)
- Draught: 29 ft (8.8 m)
- Propulsion: Coal-fired triple-expansion steam engines; twin screws
- Speed: 16.75 knots (31.02 km/h; 19.28 mph)
- Complement: 630
- Armament: 1 × 2 BL 16.25-inch (413 mm) guns; 1 × BL 10-inch (254 mm) gun; 12 × BL 6-inch (152 mm) guns; 12 × 6-pounder (2.7 kg) guns; 6 × 14 inch (356 mm) torpedo tubes
- Armour: Belt: 18 in (457 mm); Bulkheads: 16 in (406 mm); Turrets: 17 in (432 mm); Redoubt: 18 in (457 mm); Battery screens: 6–3 in (152–76 mm); Conning Tower: 14–2 in (356–51 mm); Deck: 3 in (76 mm)

The Royal Navy's Victoria class (or Sans Pareil class) of the 1880s was the first class of ironclad warship (sometimes described as a battleship) which used triple expansion steam engines, previous classes having used compound engines.

There were only two ships in this class. The lead ship, HMS Victoria, was sunk in an accidental collision with another Royal Navy battleship, HMS Camperdown in the Mediterranean Sea with the loss of half of her crew. Her sister ship, HMS Sans Pareil, survived until she was scrapped in April 1907.

== Design ==
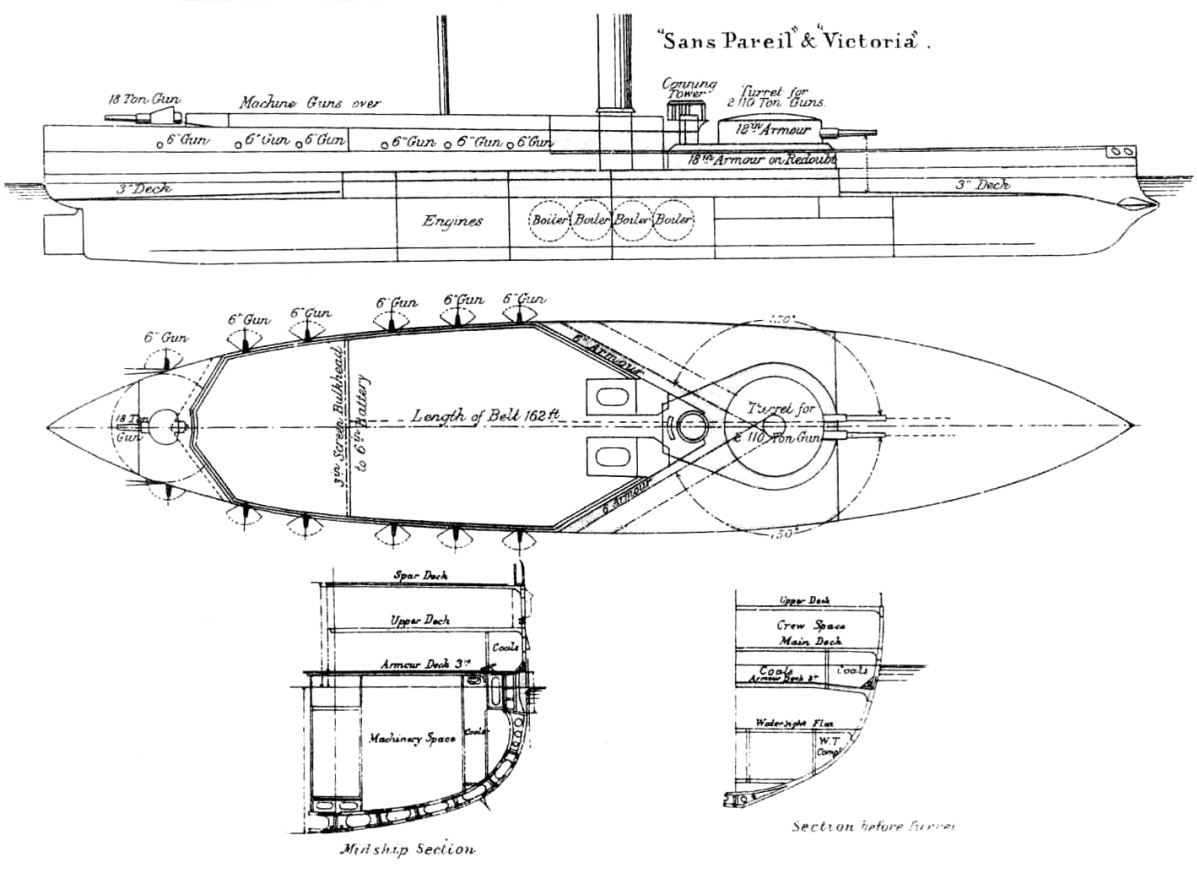
Starboard elevation, deck plan and sectional views, as shown in Brassey's naval annual 1888–9

This class was intended to be an improved version of HMS Conqueror, and it was originally called the new Conquerors.

=== Armament ===
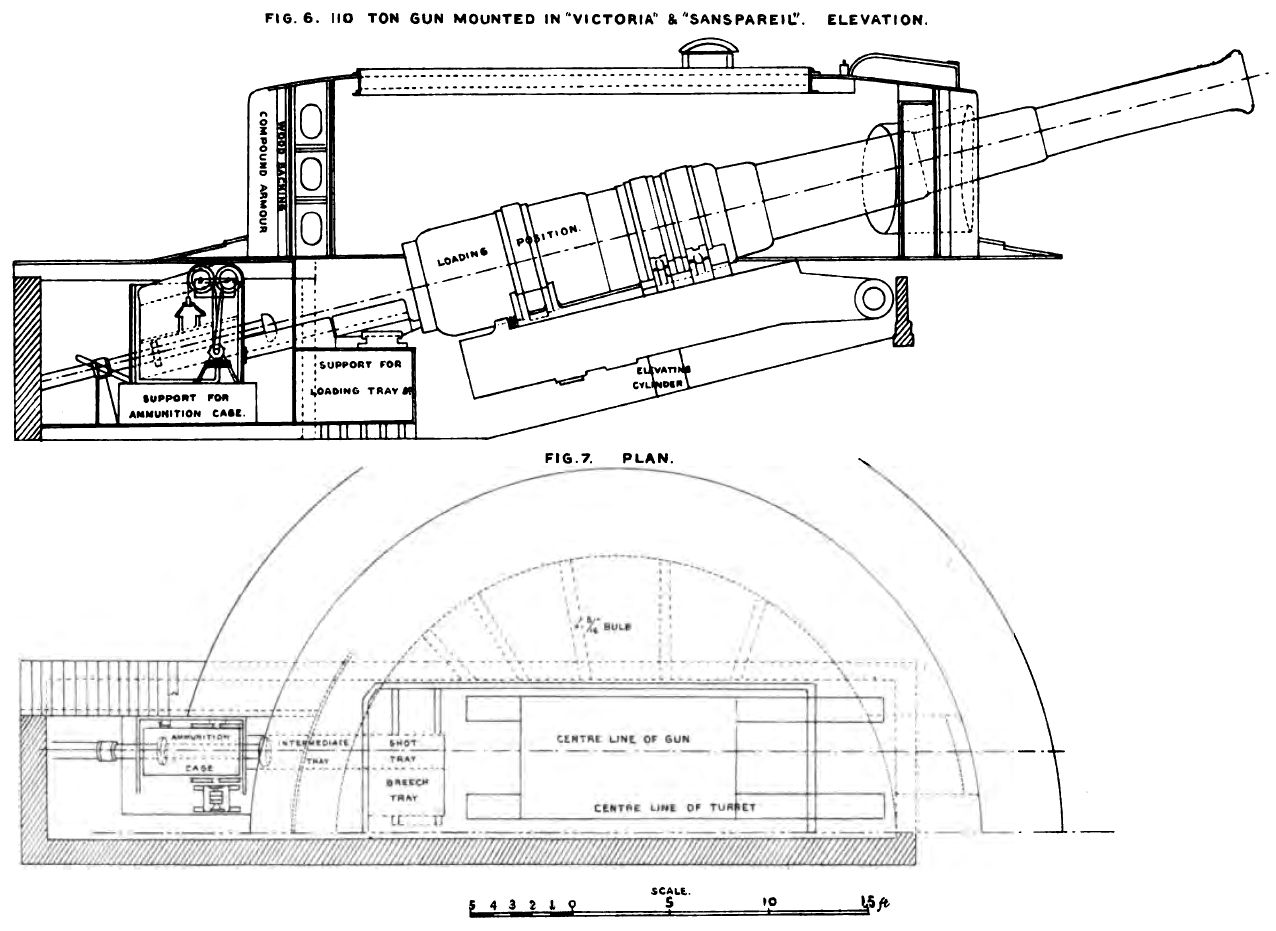
BL 16.25 inch gun in loading position in turret

The original intention had been to fit 13.5 inch (343 mm), 67-ton guns in place of the Conqueror's 12 inch (305 mm) guns in the single forward turret but late during the design it was decided to enlarge them to take the 16.25 inch (413 mm), 110-ton gun. Similar guns had been supplied by the manufacturer, Sir W. G. Armstrong, Whitworth & Co., Ltd., to the Italian Regia Marina and fitted in the Andrea Doria and the 1,800 pound (816 kg) projectile could penetrate any thickness of armour afloat at that time. At a period when naval supremacy of the Mediterranean was seen as a crucial part of British policy, the Victoria class was intended for service as part of the British Mediterranean Fleet. The same model of gun had been fitted in the last Admiral-class ironclad HMS Benbow, which had a single example in each of its two barbettes instead of pairs of 13.5 inch (343 mm) guns and was the only other British warship to carry them.

The gun was not successful in service since it took four or five minutes to load and fire. The barrel only had a 75-round life and the muzzle tended to droop.

The rear turret contained a smaller 10 inch (254 mm) gun of similar design, and which weighed 26 tons.

=== Seakeeping ===
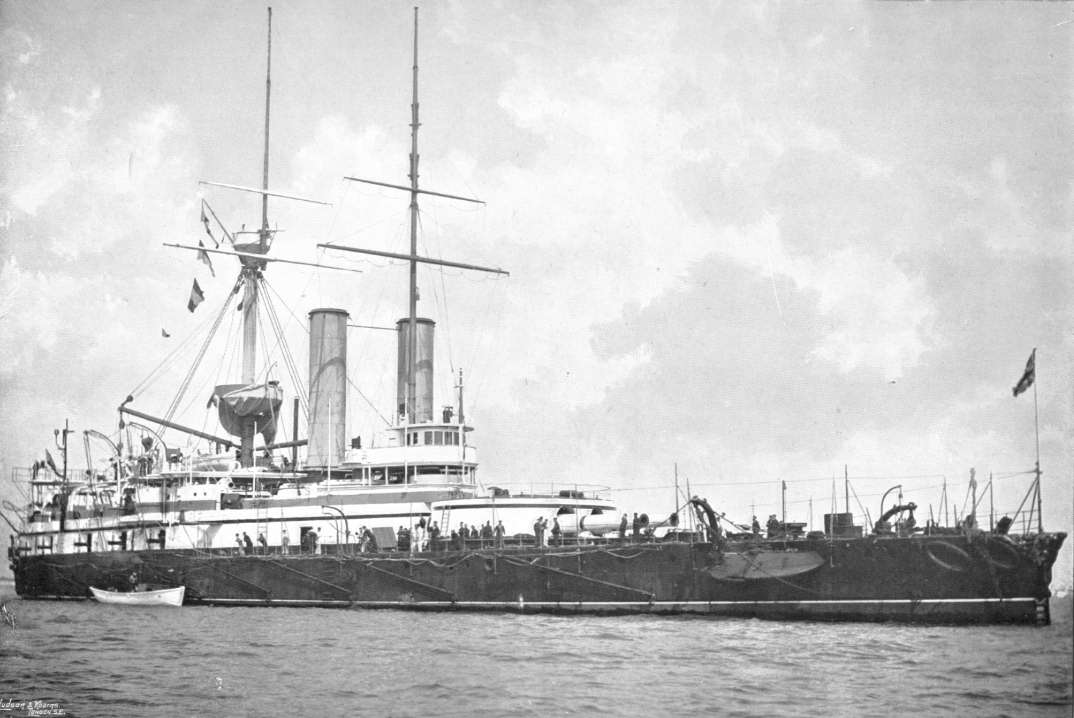
HMS Sans Pareil

This class was one of the last of this period to have very low freeboard, of around 10 feet (3 m). This was done to reduce target area in a naval engagement but had a deleterious effect upon seaworthiness, and was an important factor in Victoria sinking within fifteen minutes following a collision since it allowed the water to quickly reach the gun turret ports.

=== Propulsion ===
The most successful innovation of the class was the introduction of triple expansion steam engines into Royal Navy battleships. These engines had been developed as a result of the introduction of steel in boiler manufacture, which in turn had led to higher steam pressures. The Royal Navy had originally tried them with great success in the torpedo gunboat HMS Rattlesnake. The principal benefit was the improved efficiency of the engine meant a reduced displacement because less coal was needed. In trials, HMS Thunderer, which had been re-engined with triple-expansion engines in 1889–1891, showed that the coal consumption at 80% power was roughly halved.

== Ships ==
Name	Builder	Laid down	Launched	Completed
Victoria	Armstrong, Mitchell & Co.	13 June 1885	9 April 1887	1890
Sans Pareil	Thames Ironworks and Shipbuilding Company	21 April 1885	9 May 1887	1891

== Bibliography ==
- Brown, David K. (1997). Warrior to Dreadnought: Warship Development 1860–1905. Chatham Publishing. ISBN 1-86176-022-1.
- Friedman, Norman (2018). British Battleships of the Victorian Era. Naval Institute Press. ISBN 978-1-68247-329-0.
- Parkes, Oscar (1990) [1966]. British Battleships, Warrior 1860 to Vanguard 1950: A History of Design, Construction, and Armament (New & rev. ed.). Naval Institute Press. ISBN 1-55750-075-4.
- Roberts, John (1979). "Great Britain (including Empire Forces)". In Chesneau, Roger & Kolesnik, Eugene M. (eds.). Conway's All the World's Fighting Ships 1860–1905. Mayflower Books. pp. 1–113. ISBN 0-8317-0302-4.
