= HMS Sans Pareil (1887) =

British battleship (1891–1907)

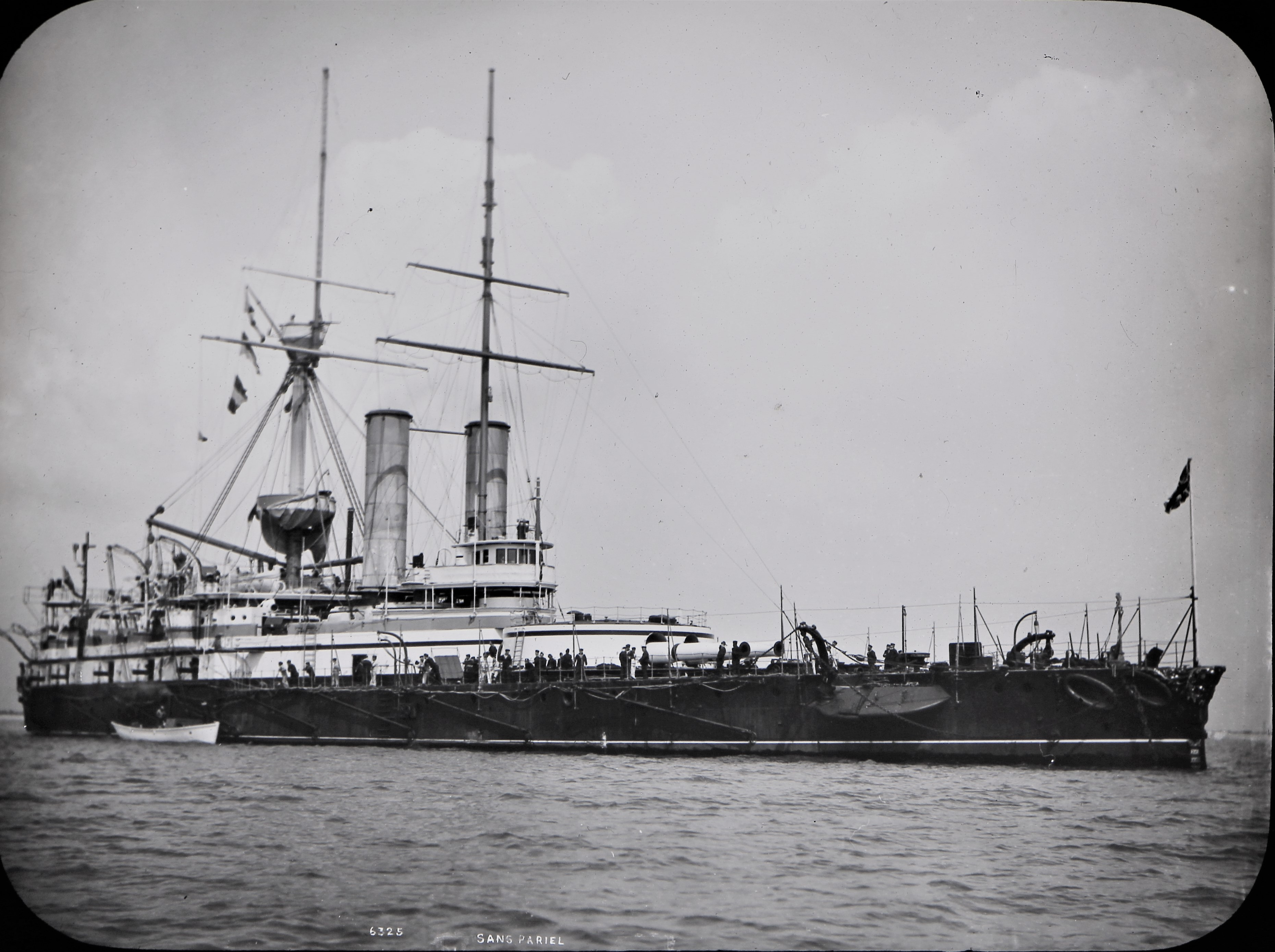
- HMS Sans Pareil

History

United Kingdom
- Name: HMS Sans Pareil
- Builder: Thames Ironworks and Shipbuilding Company, Leamouth, London
- Laid down: 21 April 1885
- Launched: 9 May 1887
- Commissioned: 8 July 1891
- Nickname(s): Sans Pareil and her sister ship Victoria together were known as "The Pair of Slippers"
- Fate: Sold for scrapping to Thos. W. Ward, 9 April 1907

General characteristics
- Class & type: Victoria-class battleship
- Displacement: 10,470 tons
- Length: 370 ft (110 m)
- Beam: 70 ft (21 m)
- Draught: 26 ft 9 in (8.15 m)
- Propulsion: Humphreys & Tennant triple expansion engines; 2 shafts; 8,000 ihp natural draught; 14,482 ihp forced draught
- Speed: 16 knots (30 km/h) natural draught; 17.75 knots (32.87 km/h) forced draught
- Complement: 550
- Armament: 2 × BL 16.25-inch (412.8 mm) guns; 1 × BL 10-inch (254.0 mm) gun; 12 × BL 6-inch (152.4 mm) guns; 12 × 6-pounder; 6 × torpedo tubes
- Armour: Belt: 18 in (46 cm); Bulkheads: 16 in (41 cm); Turrets: 17 in (43 cm); Redoubt: 18 in (46 cm); Forward screen to battery: 6 in (15 cm); After screen to battery: 3 in (7.6 cm); Conning Tower: 14 in (36 cm) (sides), 2 in (5.1 cm) (top); Deck: 3 in (7.6 cm)

Service record
- Part of: Mediterranean Fleet 1892-1895; Guard ship Sheerness 1895-1904

HMS Sans Pareil was one of the two Victoria-class battleship of the British Royal Navy of the Victorian era, her sister ship being HMS Victoria.

== Design ==
In deciding upon her design configuration the Board of Admiralty took what history shows was a retrograde step by requesting the reversion from barbettes to turrets for her main armament. She was completed slightly later than her sister-ship and was hence the last British battleship ever to be equipped with her main armament mounted in a single turret.

The choice of calibre, while influenced by the desire to mount as heavy guns as possible, was also influenced by the slow rate of production in the Woolwich yards of the 13.5-inch (340 mm) calibre guns mounted in most of the preceding Admiral class. HMS Benbow, of that class, mounted the heavier calibre guns for the same reason. Following on from this decision, and given that a turret is heavier than a barbette, it was not possible to mount the two guns separately in fore and aft positions and at the same time keep the ship within the displacement stipulated by the Board. Hence both were mounted in a single turret, placed forward of the superstructure. To provide a nominal fire to stern, a 10-inch (250 mm) gun was mounted aft of the superstructure, behind a light armour shield. This weapon fired a shell weighing 500 pounds with a muzzle velocity of 2,040 ft/s (620 m/s), and could in theory penetrate an iron plate of thickness of 20.4 inches (520 mm) at a range of 1,000 yards (910 m).

The Elswick yards also experienced delays in producing the gun of 16.25 inches (413 mm) calibre, so in fact the times between laying down and completion of the Admirals and of Sans Pareil were closely comparable.

Sans Pareil was the last battleship to be designed by Nathaniel Barnaby.

Sans Pareil was laid down at Thames Ironworks and Shipbuilding Company's Blackwall, London shipyard on 21 April 1885 and launched on 9 May 1887. Completion was delayed by problems with the ships main guns, with one of Victoria's guns failing during proof testing, requiring the provision of strengthened guns. She was completed on 8 July 1891.

== Service history ==
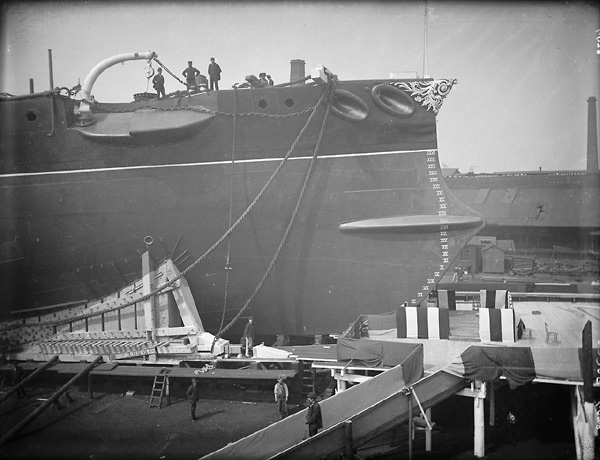
The bow of Sans Pareil while under construction at Thames Ironworks, showing her ram.

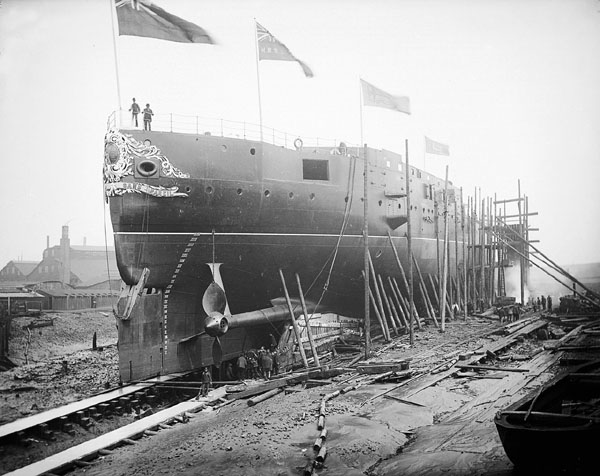
Sans Pareil viewed from the stern, ready for launching at the Thames Ironworks

She was commissioned at Chatham on 8 July 1891 to take part in manoeuvres, and then went into reserve. She was posted to the Mediterranean Fleet in February 1892, leaving Spithead for the Mediterranean on 7 March 1892 to replace Victoria as the flagship of George Tryon, Commander in Chief of the Mediterranean Fleet. Sans Pareil served on this station until April 1895 when she paid off and was named as port guard ship at Sheerness. On 7 April 1897, the Medina-class gunboat Slaney was swept onto the moored Sans Pareil's bows by a strong current in Sheerness harbour. While San Pareil was undamaged, Slaney's hull was holed, and the gunboat was run ashore to avoid sinking.

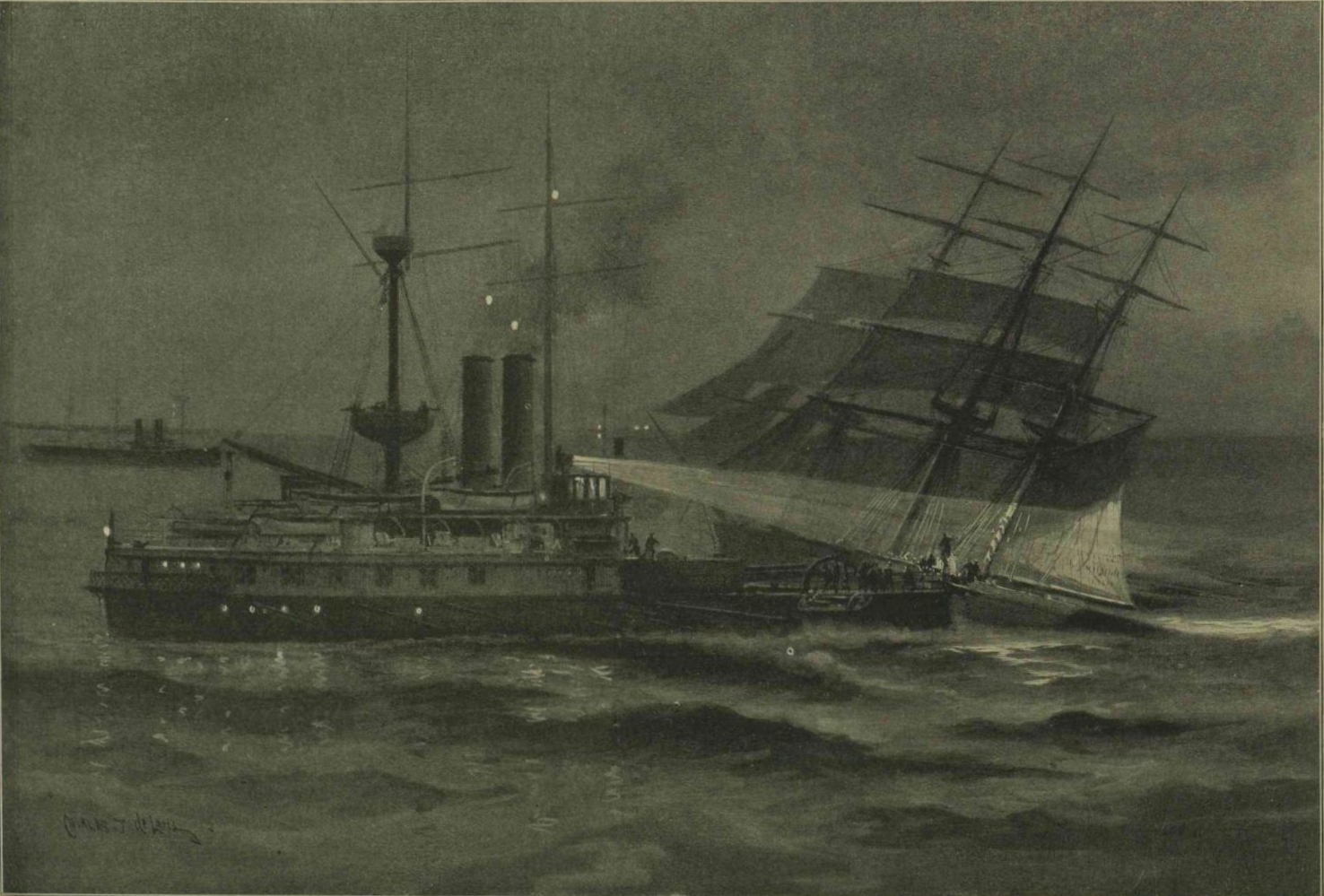
Sans Pareil collided with, and sank, the East Lothian a merchant vessel of 1400 tons off the Lizard on 7 August 1899

Sans Pareil was refitted from April 1899. but resumed duty as Sheerness guardship in June that year. Longitudinal bulkheads in forward compartments, which had contributed to the loss of Victoria by confining flooding to the damaged side, and increasing the capsizing effect, were removed during this refit. On 7 August 1899, Sans Pareil was returning from manoeuvres as part of the Channel Fleet and was at the head of a division of ships when she collided with the Schooner East Lothian, which was on a voyage from Nantes to Cardiff and was under tow from a tug. East Lothian sank within a few minutes. One man was killed, with the remaining 20 people aboard the schooner (including the captain's wife and son) were rescued. Sans Pareil's officer at the watch at the time of the collision was found guilty of negligently performing his duties at a court martial, and was severely reprimanded and dismissed from the ship. Despite this, attempts by the owner of East Lothian to receive compensation were rejected by both the Admiralty court and the Court of Appeal. She resumed duty as Sheerness guardship on 19 January 1900, serving until January 1904. During these years she was part of the Home Squadron when she toured with three other port guard ships of the Home Fleet. On 1 October 1901 Rear-Admiral Sir Baldwin Walker hoisted his flag as second in command of the Reserve squadron.

In June 1902 she was docked in the Medway, during a trial of the New Bermuda Floating dock. She took part in the fleet review held at Spithead on 16 August 1902 for the coronation of King Edward VII, and the following month went to Chatham Dockyard for a short refit, resuming duty after a couple of weeks.

She was sold for scrap in 1907 as part of the fleet modernisation programme instigated by the First Sea Lord, Admiral Fisher, and dismantled at the dock on the River Ribble, Preston, Lancashire. A model of the ship was removed from her at that time and is thought to be either the builder's model or constructed by the ship's crew. The 3m long model required some restoration and is now on display in 'The Story of Preston' at Preston's Harris Museum and Library.
