= HMS Seahorse (1880) =

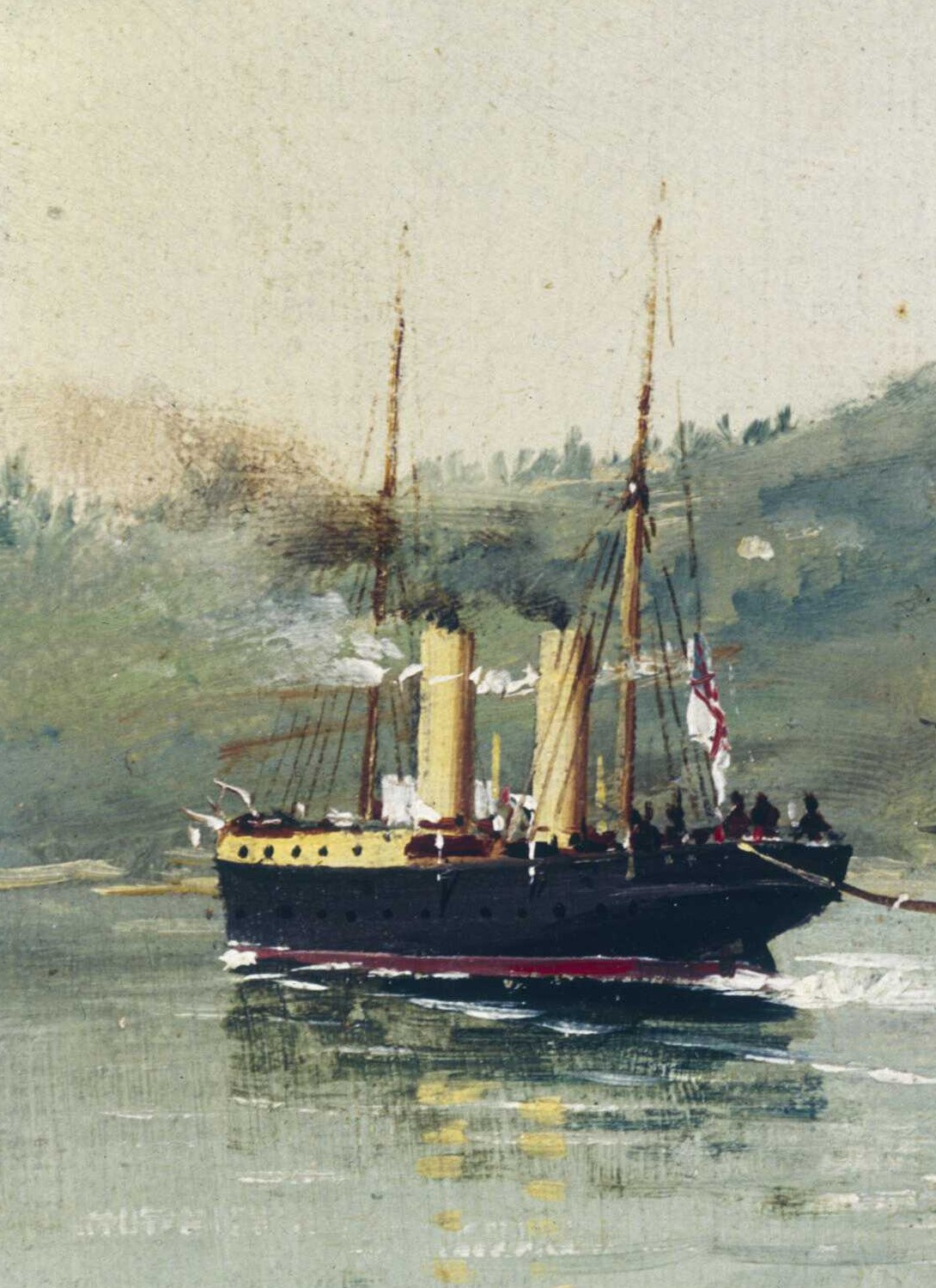
- HMS Seahorse

History

United Kingdom
- Name: HMS Seahorse (pennant W.72 from 1918)
- Namesake: seahorse
- Builder: Laird Brothers
- Yard number: 471
- Launched: 7 July 1880
- Commissioned: 20 January 1881
- Fate: Sold 1 May 1920 to Crichton Thompson

History

Spain
- Name: Chita
- Namesake: cheetah
- Owner: 1921-1925: Arsenio Sanjurjo Igual, Santander; 1925-1928: Luis Liaño, Santander; 1928-1933: Nicolas Pardo y Pardo, Santander
- Fate: Broken up in 1933

General characteristics
- Displacement: 670 tons
- Length: 160 ft pp, 168 feet overall
- Beam: 26 ft
- Draught: 10 ft
- Speed: 12.5 knots
- Complement: 84
- Armament: One 12 pounder or two six pounder

HMS Seahorse was a Royal Navy fleet tug, tender and survey ship built in 1880. She served until the end of the First World War and was subsequently sold for commercial service in Spain.

== Description ==
HMS Seahorse was designed and built by Laird Brothers at Birkenhead (Note: Some sources erroneously state that she was built at Paisley, Scotland) for the Royal Navy as a fast deep-sea tug, suitable for handling their new classes of ironclad warship. In addition she was equipped for deployment as a fleet tender and despatch vessel. Steel was used in both the engines and shafts and, in the form of Siemens-Martin steel from the Landore Steel Company, for the hull and upperworks. (Note: Some sources state the hull to have been of iron) Seahorse's displacement was 670 tons, and dimensions 160 ft (48.8 m) length between perpendiculars, 168 ft (51.2 m) length overall, 26 ft (7.9 m) beam and with 10 ft (3.0 m) draught. She was powered by a pair of compound steam engines totalling 1100 ihp driving twin screws.

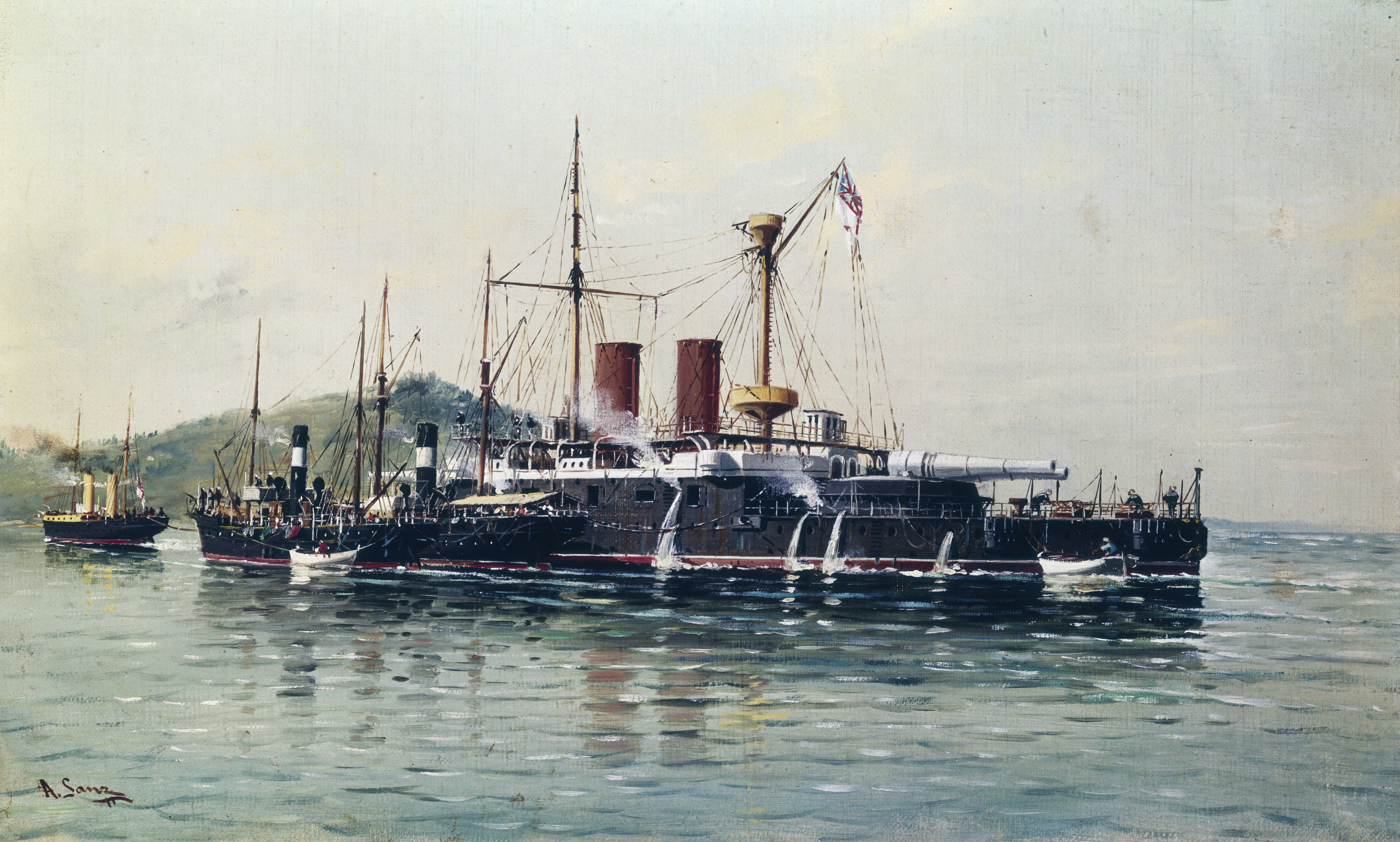
HMS Howe being towed into Ferrol by Seahorse with salvage steamers alongside, April 1893, by Alfonso Sanz

== Service history ==
Based at Portsmouth, as well as a fleet tug, Seahorse served in a variety of roles, including survey ship, and was often described as a gunboat or "special service vessel". During the Anglo-Egyptian War of 1882 Seahorse was additionally equipped with gatling guns and stationed at Port Said for towing and patrol duties in the Suez Canal. Amongst her salvage jobs was the battleship HMS Howe, which stranded on a shoal off Ferrol, Spain, in November 1892 and could be refloated only five months later. During the First World War she continued to be based at Portsmouth where she was used as a fleet tug, and later a rescue tug.

== Commercial service ==
On 1 May 1920 Seahorse was disposed of by the Admiralty to Crichton Thompson & Co Ltd, and resold to Arsenio Sanjurjo Igual of Santander, Spain, where she was renamed Chita. She changed hands twice at Santander, first to Luis Liaño in 1925 and then to Nicolas Pardo y Pardo in 1928. She was finally broken up at Santander in 1933.
