= HMS Howe (1885) =

Admiral-class battleship

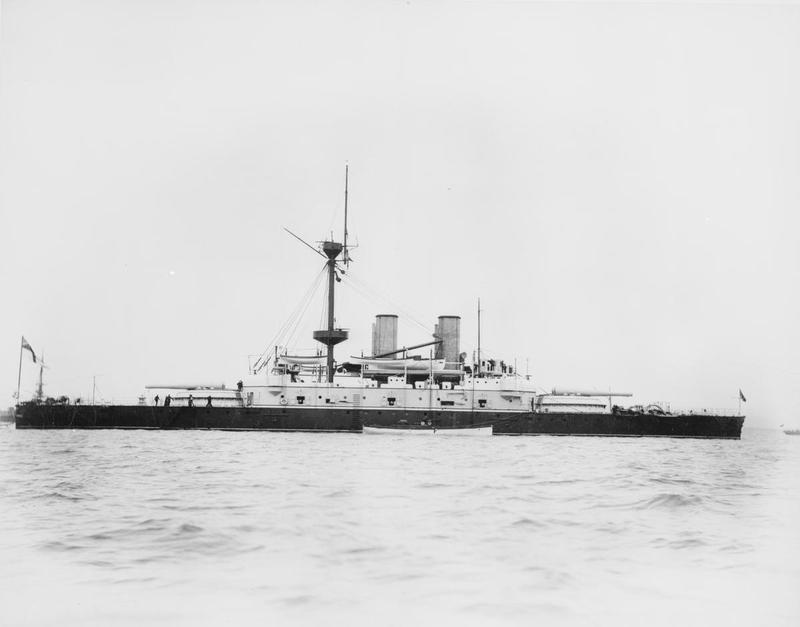
- Howe at anchor, before October 1904

History

United Kingdom
- Name: Howe
- Namesake: Admiral Richard Howe
- Builder: Pembroke Dockyard
- Cost: £639,434
- Laid down: 7 June 1882
- Launched: 28 April 1885
- Commissioned: 18 July 1889
- Out of service: September, 1904
- Fate: Sold for scrap, 11 October 1910

General characteristics
- Class & type: Admiral-class ironclad battleship
- Displacement: 10,300 long tons (10,500 t)
- Length: 325 ft (99.1 m) (p.p.)
- Beam: 68 ft (20.7 m)
- Draught: 27 ft 10 in (8.5 m)
- Installed power: 7,500 ihp (5,600 kW) (normal); 11,500 ihp (8,600 kW) (forced draught)
- Propulsion: 2 × Humphreys compound-expansion steam engines; 2 × screws
- Speed: 16.9 kn (31.3 km/h; 19.4 mph) (forced draught)
- Range: 7,200 nmi (13,300 km; 8,300 mi) at 10 knots (19 km/h; 12 mph)
- Complement: 525–536
- Armament: 2 × twin 13.5 in (343 mm) guns; 6 × single 6 in (152 mm) guns; 12 × single 6-pdr 2.2 in (57 mm) Hotchkiss guns; 10 × single 3-pdr 1.9 in (47 mm) Hotchkiss guns; 5 × 14 in (356 mm) torpedo tubes
- Armour: Waterline belt: 18–8 in (457–203 mm); Bulkheads: 16–7 in (406–178 mm); Barbettes: 11.5–10 in (292–254 mm); Conning tower: 12–2 in (305–51 mm); Deck: 3–2.5 in (76–64 mm)

HMS Howe was an Admiral-class ironclad battleship built for the Royal Navy during the 1880s. The ship was assigned to the Channel Fleet in mid-1890 and was badly damaged when she ran aground in late 1892. After repairs were completed, Howe was transferred to the Mediterranean Fleet in late 1893. She returned home in late 1896 and became a guardship in Ireland. Howe remained there until late 1901 when she was assigned to the Reserve Fleet. The ship was paid off in three years later and then sold for scrap in 1910.

== Design and description ==
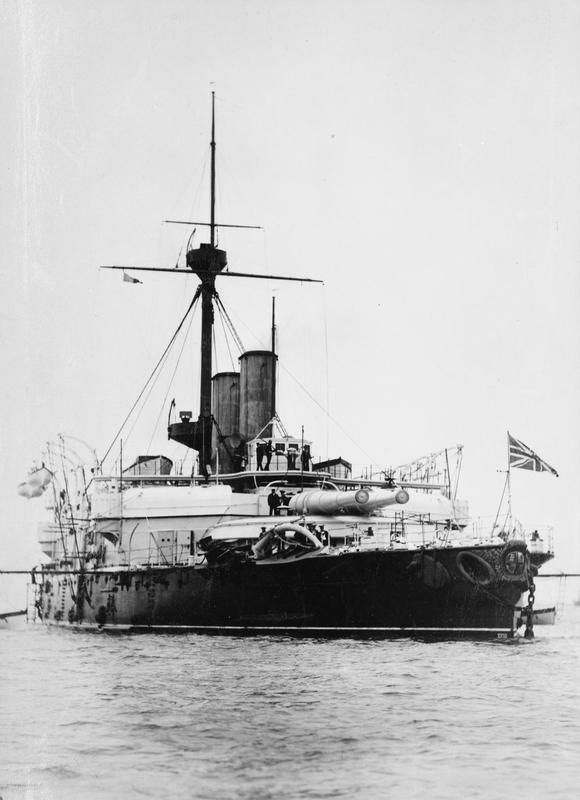
A bow view of Howe at anchor

The Admiral class was built in response to French ironclad battleships of the Hoche and Marceau classes. Howe and her sister ship, Rodney, were enlarged and improved versions of Collingwood with a more powerful armament. The sisters had a length between perpendiculars of 325 feet (99.1 m), a beam of 68 feet (20.7 m), and a draught of 27 feet 10 inches (8.5 m) at deep load. They displaced 10,300 long tons (10,500 t) at normal load, some 800 long tons (813 t) heavier than Collingwood, mainly due to the heavier armament, which also increased the draught by 18 inches (457 mm). The ships had a complement of 525–536 officers and ratings.

Howe was powered by two 3-cylinder inverted compound-expansion steam engines, each driving one propeller. The Humphreys engines produced a total of 7,500 indicated horsepower (5,600 kW) at normal draught and 11,500 ihp (8,600 kW) with forced draught, using steam provided by a dozen cylindrical boilers. The sisters were designed to reach a speed of 16 knots (30 km/h; 18 mph) at normal draught and Howe reached 16.9 knots (31.3 km/h; 19.4 mph) on her sea trials, using forced draught. The ships carried a maximum of 1,200 long tons (1,219 t) of coal that gave her a range of 7,200 nautical miles (13,300 km; 8,300 mi) at a speed of 10 knots (19 km/h; 12 mph).

=== Armament and armour ===
Unlike Collingwood, the later four Admiral-class ships had a main armament of 30-calibre rifled breech-loading (BL) 13.5-inch (343 mm) Mk II guns, rather than the 12-inch (305 mm) guns in the earlier ship. The four guns were mounted in two twin-gun, pear-shaped barbettes, one forward and one aft of the superstructure. The barbettes were open, without hoods or gun shields, and the guns were fully exposed. The 1,250-pound (570 kg) shells fired by these guns were credited with the ability to penetrate 28 inches (711 mm) of wrought iron at 1,000 yards (910 m), using a charge of 630 pounds (290 kg) of smokeless brown cocoa (SBC). At maximum elevation, the guns had a range of around 11,950 yards (10,930 m) with SBC; later a charge of 187 pounds (85 kg) of cordite was substituted for the SBC which extended the range to about 12,620 yards (11,540 m). There were significant delays in the production of the heavy guns for this ship and her sisters, due to cracking in the innermost layer of the guns, that significantly delayed the delivery of these ships. Even as late as early 1890, Howe only had two of her guns installed.

The secondary armament of the Admirals consisted of six 26-calibre BL 6-inch (152 mm) Mk IV guns on single mounts positioned on the upper deck amidships, three on each broadside. They fired 100-pound (45 kg) shells that were credited with the ability to penetrate 10.5 inches (267 mm) of wrought iron at 1000 yards. They had a range of 8,830 yards (8,070 m) at an elevation of +15° using prismatic black powder. Beginning around 1895 all of these guns were converted into quick-firing guns (QF) with a much faster rate of fire. Using cordite extended their range to 9,275 yards (8,481 m). For defence against torpedo boats the ships carried a dozen QF 6-pounder 2.2-inch (57 mm) Hotchkiss guns and 10 QF 3-pdr 1.9-inch (47 mm) Hotchkiss guns. They also mounted five 14-inch (356 mm) above-water torpedo tubes, one in the bow and four on the broadside.

The armour scheme of Howe and Rodney was virtually identical to that of Collingwood. The waterline armour belt of compound armour extended across the middle of the ships between the rear of each barbette for a the length of 140 feet (42.7 m). It had a total height of 7 feet 6 inches (2.3 m) deep of which 6 feet 6 inches (2.0 m) was below water and 1 foot (0.3 m) above at normal load; at deep load, their draught increased by another 6 inches. The upper 4 feet (1.2 m) of the belt armour was 18 inches (457 mm) thick and the plates tapered to 8 inches (203 mm) at the bottom edge. Lateral bulkheads at the ends of the belt connected it to the barbettes; they were 16 inches (406 mm) thick at main deck level and 7 inches (178 mm) below.

The barbettes ranged in thickness from 11.5 to 10 inches (292 to 254 mm) with the main ammunition hoists protected by armoured tubes with walls 12 inches thick. The conning towers also had walls of that thickness as well as roofs 2 inches (51 mm) thick. The deck of the central armoured citadel had a thickness of 3 inches (76 mm) and the lower deck was 2.5 inches (64 mm) thick from the ends of the belt to the bow and stern.

== Construction and career ==
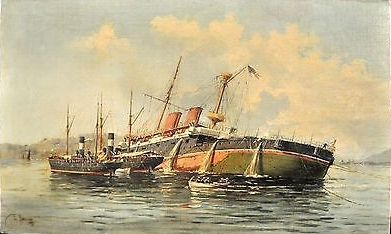
HMS Howe being salvaged, prior to the arrival of HMS Seahorse for towing into Emsenanda de la Malata, by Alfonso Sanz

Howe, named after Admiral Richard Howe, was the fourth ship of her name to serve in the Royal Navy. The ship was laid down at Pembroke Dockyard on 7 June 1882, launched on 28 April 1885 and was delivered at Portsmouth on 15 November 1885, complete except for her main armament, at a cost of £639,434. She was commissioned on 18 July 1889 to take part in fleet manoeuvres. Finally fully armed, she was assigned to the Channel Fleet in May 1890. On 2 November 1892, she ran aground on a shoal off Ferrol, Spain, due primarily to faulty charts, and was salvaged with great difficulty, being finally freed by HMS Seahorse on 30 March 1893. The ship paid off at Chatham Dockyard for repairs and an overhaul that cost £45,000.

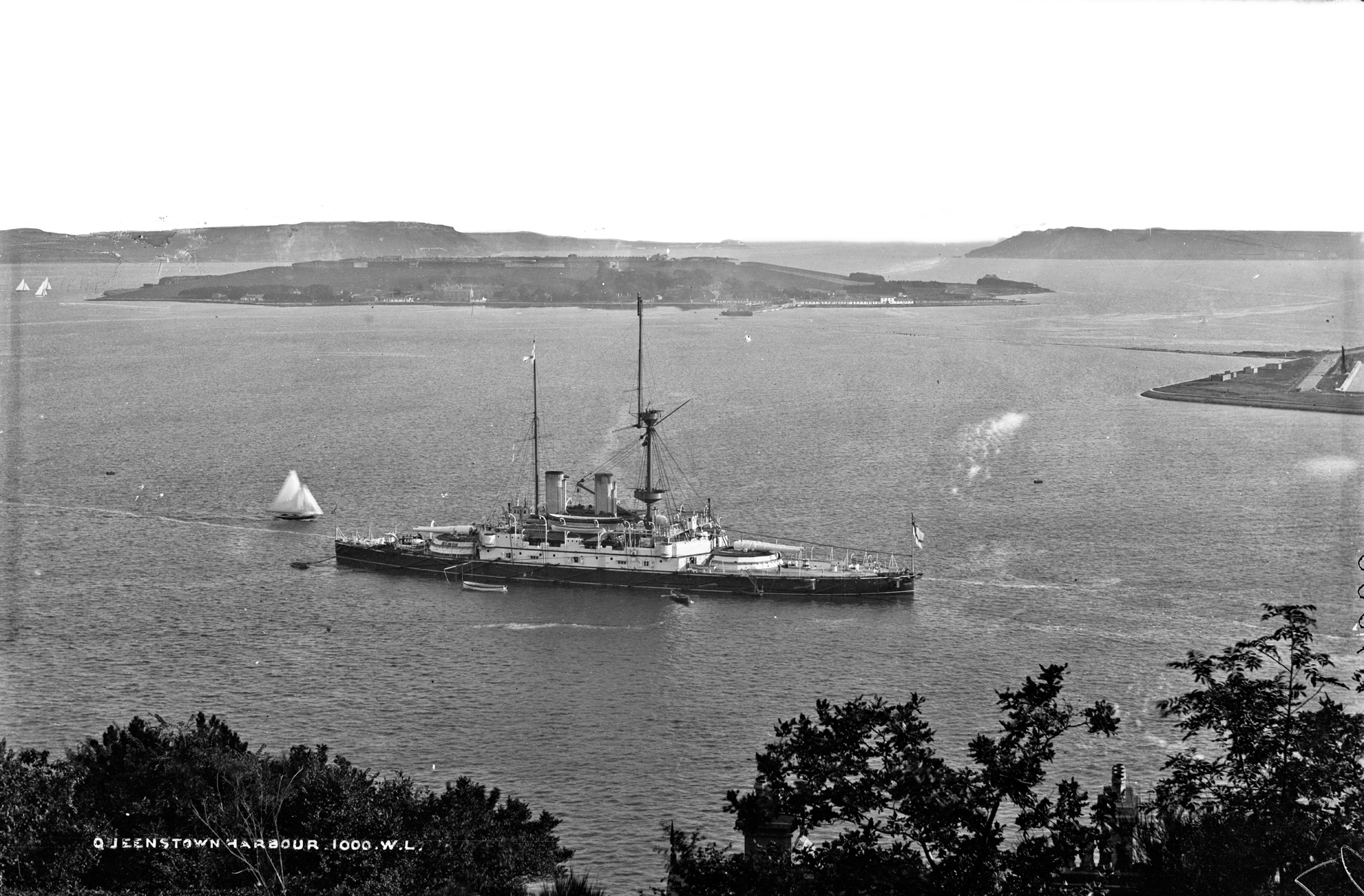
Howe, at Queenstown harbour, Co. Cork

In October of that year, Howe was transferred to the Mediterranean Fleet where she remained until December 1896, when she became port guardship at Queenstown. Captain Henry Louis Fleet was in command from January 1900 until she was paid off at Devonport on 12 October 1901, when her entire crew was transferred to HMS Empress of India, which took over as the Queenstown guardship. The ship was then assigned to the Reserve Fleet and then fully decommissioned after her last manoeuvres in September 1904. Howe was sold to Thos. W. Ward for £25,100 on 11 October 1910 and towed to Briton Ferry, Wales, to be broken up in January 1912.

== Bibliography ==
- Campbell, N.J.M. (1981). "British Naval Guns 1880–1945 No. 2". In Roberts, John (ed.). Warship V. London: Conway Maritime Press. pp. 96–97. ISBN 0-85177-244-7.
- Campbell, N.J.M. (1983). "British Naval Guns 1880–1945 No. 10". In Roberts, John (ed.). Warship VII. London: Conway Maritime Press. pp. 170–72. ISBN 0-85177-630-2.
- Colledge, J. J.; Warlow, Ben (2006) [1969]. Ships of the Royal Navy: The Complete Record of All Fighting Ships of the Royal Navy from the 15th Century to the Present (3rd Rev ed.). London: Chatham Publishing. ISBN 978-1-86176-281-8. OCLC 67375475.
- Chesneau, Roger & Kolesnik, Eugene M., eds. (1979). Conway's All the World's Fighting Ships 1860–1905. Greenwich: Conway Maritime Press. ISBN 0-8317-0302-4.
- Friedman, Norman (2018). British Battleships of the Victorian Era. Annapolis, Maryland: Naval Institute Press. ISBN 978-1-68247-329-0.
- Lyon, David & Winfield, Rif (2004). The Sail & Steam Navy List: All the Ships of the Royal Navy 1815–1889. London: Chatham Publishing. ISBN 1-86176-032-9.
- Parkes, Oscar (1990) [1957]. British Battleships. Annapolis, Maryland: Naval Institute Press. ISBN 1-55750-075-4.
- Silverstone, Paul H. (1984). Directory of the World's Capital Ships. New York: Hippocrene Books. ISBN 0-88254-979-0.
