= Admiral-class ironclad =

Class of pre-dreadnoughts of the Royal Navy

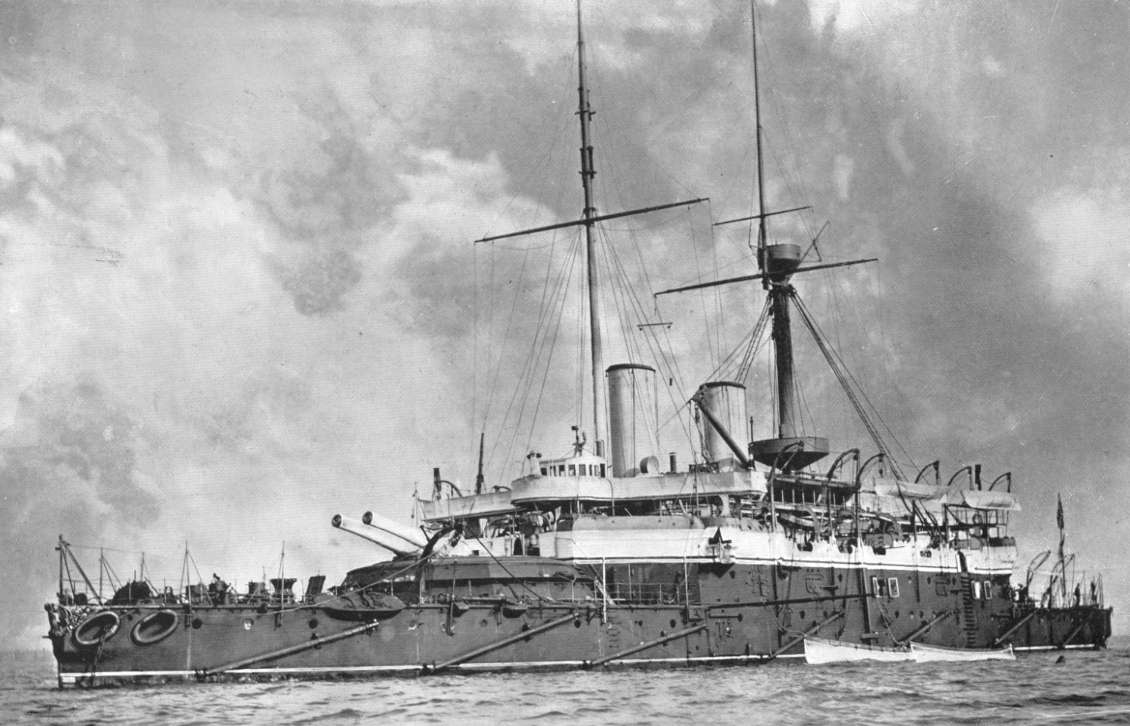
- Anson, c. 1897

Class overview
- Name: Admiral class
- Builders: Pembroke Dockyard (3); Chatham Dockyard (1); Portsmouth Dockyard (1); Thames Ironworks (1)
- Operators: Royal Navy
- Preceded by: Colossus class
- Succeeded by: Victoria class
- In commission: 1887–1910
- Completed: 6
- Scrapped: 6

General characteristics Anson and Camperdown except where stated
- Type: Ironclad battleship
- Displacement: 10,600 long tons (10,800 t)
- Length: 330 ft (101 m)
- Beam: 68 ft 6 in (21 m)
- Draught: 27 ft 10 in (8 m)
- Propulsion: Coal-fired steam engines, twin screws; 7,500 ihp (5,590 kW) (natural draught); 9,600–11,500 indicated horsepower (7,160–8,580 kW) forced draught
- Speed: 16 knots (30 km/h; 18 mph) (natural draught); 16.6–17.5 kn (31–32 km/h; 19–20 mph) (forced draught)
- Complement: 530
- Armament: Collingwood: 4 × BL 12-inch (305 mm) guns; 6 × BL 6-inch (152 mm) /26 guns; 12 × 6-pounder (57 mm) guns; 8 × 3-pounder (47 mm) guns; 4 × 14-inch (356 mm) torpedo tubes; Benbow: 2 × BL 16.25-inch (413 mm) guns; 10 × 6-inch (152 mm) BL guns; 12 × 6-pounder (57 mm) guns; 7 × 3-pounder (47 mm) guns; 5 × 14-inch (356 mm) torpedo tubes; Other ships: 4 × 13.5-inch (343 mm) guns; 6 × BL 6-inch (152 mm) /26 guns; 12 × 6-pounder (57 mm) guns; 10 × 3-pounder (47 mm) QF guns; 5 × 14-inch (356 mm) torpedo tubes
- Armour: Belt: 18–8 in (457–203 mm); Bulkheads: 16–7 in (406–178 mm); Barbettes: 11.5–10 in (292–254 mm); Conning Tower: 12–2 in (305–51 mm); Deck: 3–2 in (76–51 mm)

The British Royal Navy's ironclad Admiral-class battleships of the 1880s followed the pattern of the Devastation class in having the main armament on centreline mounts fore and aft of the superstructure. This pattern was followed by most following British designs until HMS Dreadnought in 1906. They were known as the Admiral class because they were all named after British admirals, such as Admiral George Anson.

== Ships ==
Ship	Builder	Laid down	Launched	Commissioned	Fate
Collingwood	Pembroke Dockyard, Pembroke Dock	12 July 1880	22 November 1882	1 July 1887	Broken up at Dunston, 1909
Anson	Pembroke Dockyard, Pembroke Dock	24 April 1883	17 February 1886	28 May 1889	Broken up at Upnor, 1909
Camperdown	HM Dockyard, Portsmouth	18 December 1882	24 November 1885	18 July 1889	Broken up at Swansea, 1911
Howe	Pembroke Dockyard, Pembroke Dock	2 June 1882	28 April 1885	18 July 1889	Broken up at Briton Ferry, 1912
Rodney	HM Dockyard, Chatham	6 February 1882	8 October 1884	20 June 1888	Broken up, 1909
Benbow	Thames Ironworks, London	1 November 1882	15 June 1885	14 June 1888	Broken up, 1909

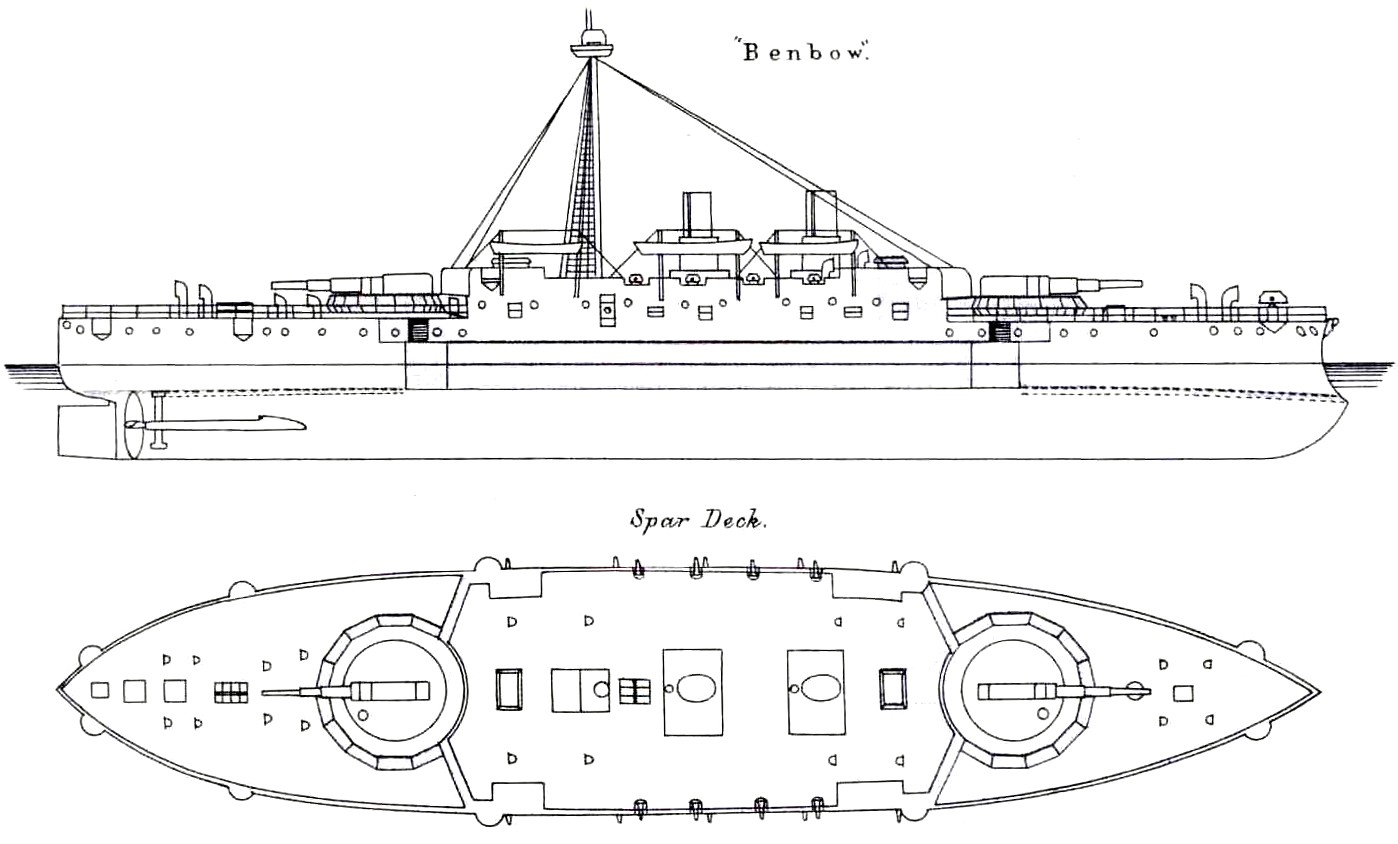
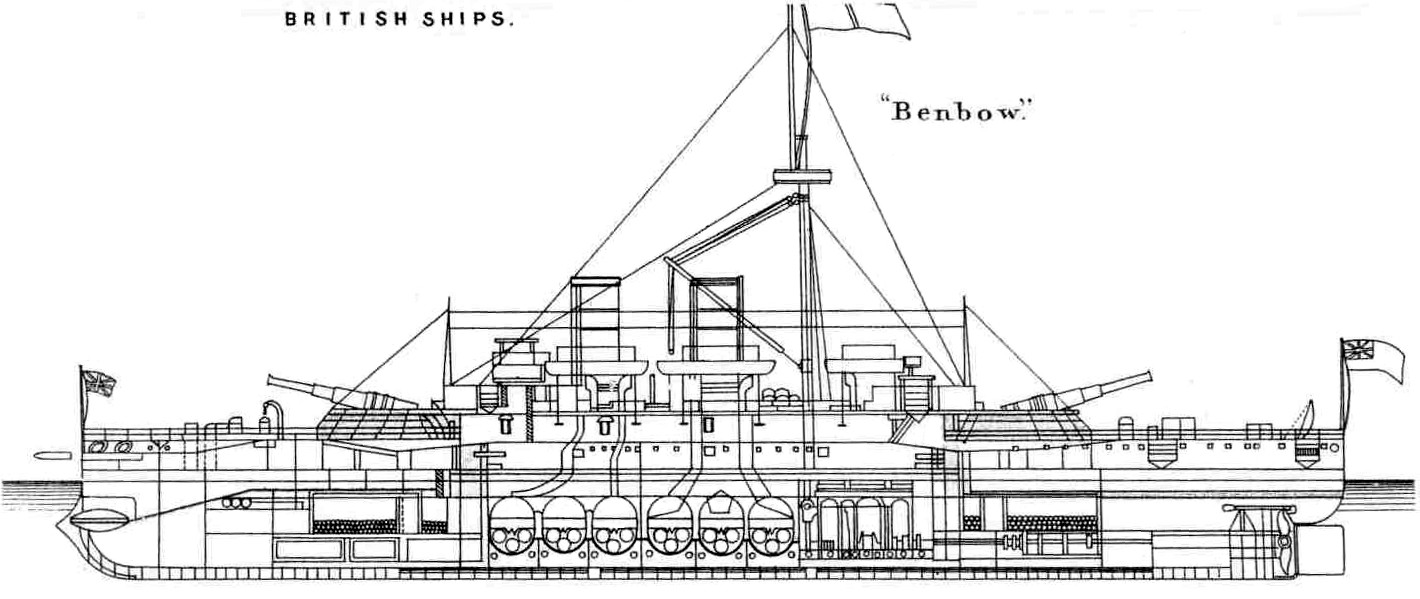
Exterior and interior views of Benbow

=== Collingwood ===
Collingwood was commissioned at Portsmouth on 1 July 1887 for Queen Victoria's Golden Jubilee Military Review, and was paid off into Reserve in August. She was posted to the Mediterranean, where she served from November 1889 to March 1897. She was coastguard ship at Bantry from March 1897–June 1903, when she paid off into the reserve, where she remained until sold.

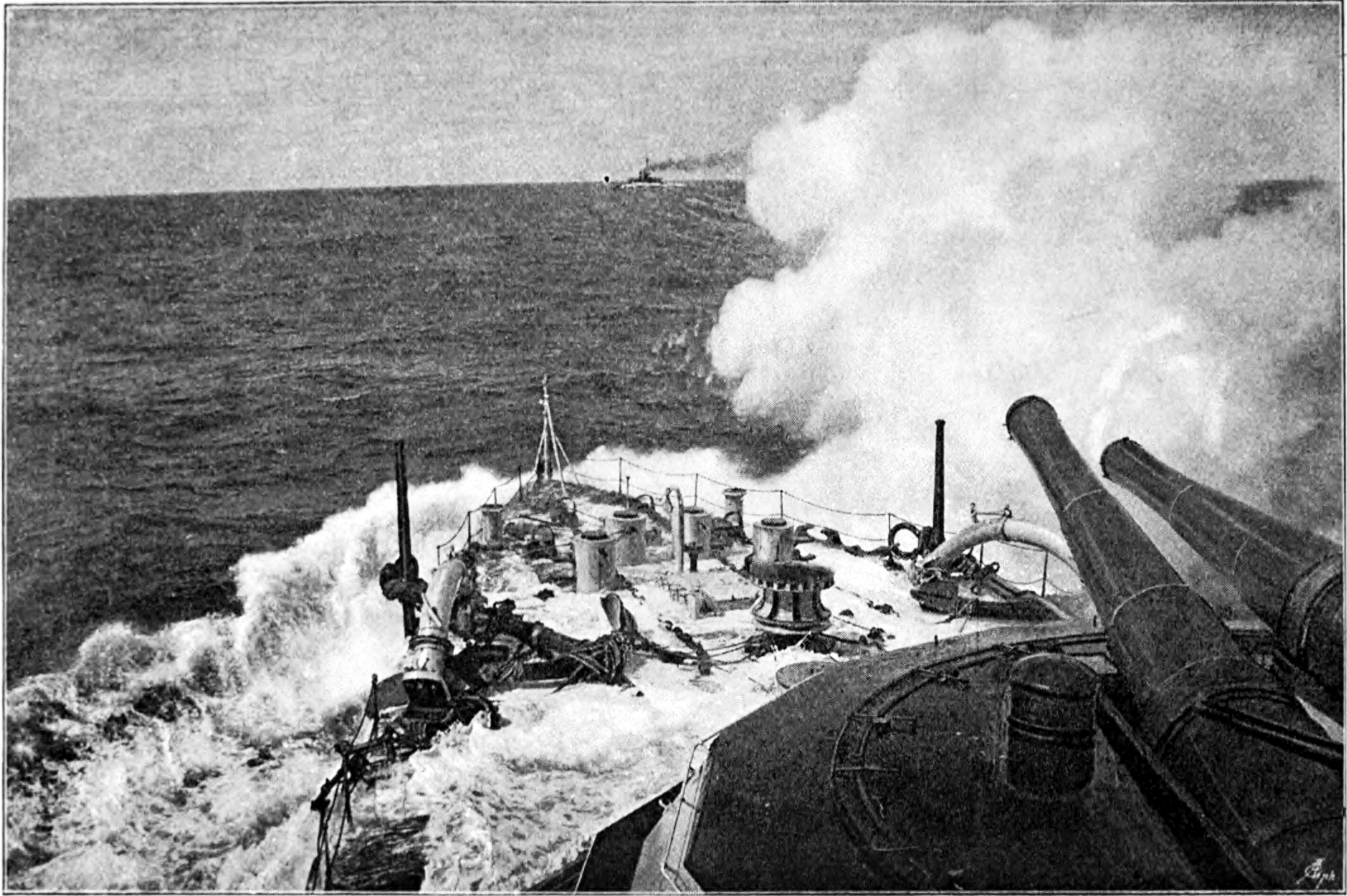
HMS Rodney steaming and firing

=== Rodney ===
Rodney was commissioned on 20 June 1888 into the Home Fleet. She was held in reserve until July 1889, and after taking part in manoeuvres until September she served with the Channel Fleet until May 1894. She was then posted to the Mediterranean, remaining there until 1897. Thereafter she was coastguard ship at Queensferry until February 1901. She remained in reserve until being sold in 1909.

=== Howe ===
Howe was delivered at Portsmouth on 15 November 1885, complete except for her main armament. She was commissioned in July 1889 to take part in fleet manoeuvres. Finally fully armed, she was posted to the Channel Fleet in May 1890, and then to the Mediterranean. On 2 November 1892, she grounded on Ferrol Rock, and was salvaged with great difficulty, being finally freed on 30 March 1893. She paid off at Chatham for repairs and overhaul, and then served in the Mediterranean until 1896, when she became port guard ship at Queenstown. In 1901, she was relegated to the reserve, where she remained until sold in 1910.

=== Camperdown ===
Camperdown was commissioned at Portsmouth on 18 July 1889, and initially went into reserve. In December 1889 she was posted to the Mediterranean Fleet as flagship, where she remained until being posted as flagship of the Channel Fleet in May 1890. She was paid off in May 1892 into Fleet reserve, recommissioning in July 1892 into the Mediterranean Fleet. On 22 June 1893, she collided with and sank the battleship Victoria with 358 deaths, including Vice-Admiral Sir George Tryon. In early 1897, she became part of the International Squadron, a multinational force made up of ships of the Austro-Hungarian Navy, French Navy, Imperial German Navy, Italian Royal Navy (Regia Marina), Imperial Russian Navy, and Royal Navy that intervened in the 1897-1898 Greek Christian uprising against the Ottoman Empire′s rule in Crete, firing her guns in anger for the first time during bombardments of the island. In September 1899, she went into Category B reserve, and in May 1900 into Dockyard reserve. In July 1900 she commissioned as a coast guard ship at Lough Swilly until May 1903. She was in reserve at Chatham until 1908, and was employed at Harwich as a berthing ship for submarines until she was sold in 1911.

=== Anson ===
Anson arrived at Portsmouth from the builder's yard in Pembroke in March 1887, and lay at anchor for two years, slowly completing for sea while waiting for her guns to be manufactured. She finally commissioned on 28 May 1889 as flagship of the Rear-Admiral, Channel Fleet. On 17 March 1891 passenger steamer SS Utopia accidentally collided with stationary Anson in the Bay of Gibraltar. 562 of Utopia's passengers and crew and two rescuers from HMS Immortalité were killed in the accident. Anson did not report any injuries or damage.

In September 1893, Anson was transferred to the Mediterranean, where she served until January 1900, with a refit at Malta in 1896. She returned home and paid off at Devonport in January 1901, re-commissioning for the newly formed Home Fleet in March of the same year. In May 1904, Anson finally paid off into reserve, where she remained until sold on 13 July 1909.

=== Benbow ===
Benbow was commissioned on 14 June 1888 for the Mediterranean Fleet, with which she served until October 1891. She was then held in the Reserve until March 1894, with two short commissions to take part in manoevres. Until April 1904 she served as guardship at Greenock, and thereafter remained in the Reserve until sold in 1909.

== Bibliography ==
- Brown, David K. (1997). Warrior to Dreadnought: Warship Development 1860–1905. Chatham Publishing. ISBN 1-86176-022-1.
- Friedman, Norman (2018). British Battleships of the Victorian Era. Annapolis, Maryland: Naval Institute Press. ISBN 978-1-68247-329-0.
- Lyon, David & Winfield, Rif (2004). The Sail & Steam Navy List: All the Ships of the Royal Navy 1815–1889. Chatham Publishing. ISBN 1-86176-032-9.
- Parkes, Oscar (1990) [1966]. British Battleships, Warrior 1860 to Vanguard 1950: A History of Design, Construction, and Armament (New & rev. ed.). Naval Institute Press. ISBN 1-55750-075-4.
- Roberts, John (1979). "Great Britain (including Empire Forces)". In Chesneau, Roger & Kolesnik, Eugene M. (eds.). Conway's All the World's Fighting Ships 1860–1905. Mayflower Books. pp. 1–113. ISBN 0-8317-0302-4.
