= HMS Victoria (1887) =

Late 19th-century Royal Navy battleship

Coordinates: 34°32′N 35°50′E

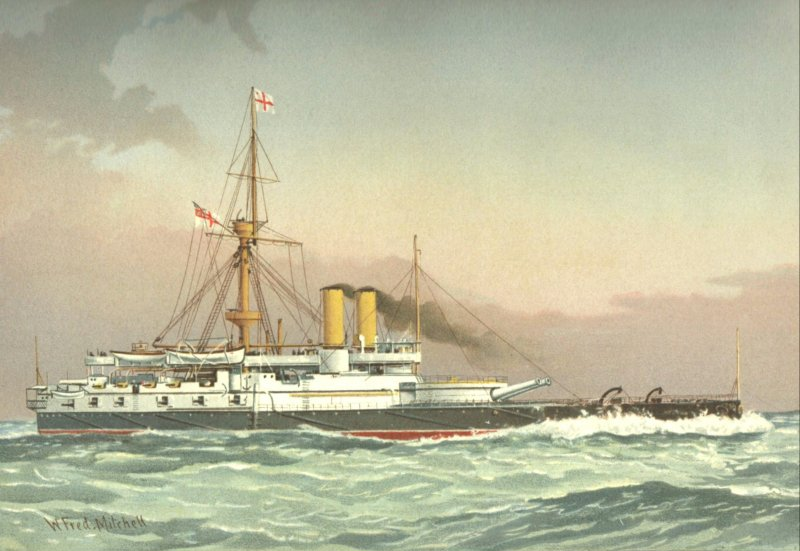
- HMS Victoria by William Frederick Mitchell

History

United Kingdom
- Name: HMS Victoria
- Namesake: Queen Victoria
- Builder: Armstrong, Mitchell & Co. Elswick yard
- Cost: £845,000
- Yard number: 490
- Laid down: 13 June 1885
- Launched: 9 April 1887
- Commissioned: March 1890
- Nickname(s): "The Slipper"; Victoria and her sister ship Sans Pareil together were known as "The Pair of Slippers"
- Fate: Accidentally rammed and sunk, 22 June 1893

General characteristics
- Class & type: Victoria-class ironclad
- Displacement: 11,020 long tons (11,197 t)
- Length: 340 ft (100 m)
- Beam: 70 ft (21 m)
- Draught: 26 ft 9 in (8.15 m)
- Installed power: 8,000 ihp (6,000 kW) (natural draught); 14,482 ihp (10,799 kW) (forced draught)
- Propulsion: 2 × Humphreys & Tennant triple-expansion engines; 2 × propellers
- Speed: 16 kn (18 mph; 30 km/h) (natural draught); 17.3 kn (19.9 mph; 32.0 km/h) (forced draught)
- Complement: 430; as flagship: 583
- Armament: 2 × BL 16.25-inch (413 mm) guns; 1 × BL 10-inch (254 mm) gun; 12 × BL 6-inch (152 mm) guns; 12 × 6-pounder (57 mm) guns; 6 × 14 in (360 mm) torpedo tubes
- Armour: Belt: 18 in (46 cm); Bulkheads: 16 in (41 cm); Turrets: 17 in (43 cm); Redoubt: 18 in (46 cm); Forward screen to battery: 6 in (15 cm); After screen to battery: 3 in (7.6 cm); Conning Tower: 14 in (36 cm) (sides), 2 in (5.1 cm) (top); Deck: 3 in (7.6 cm)

Service record
- Part of: Mediterranean Fleet
- Commanders: Captain Maurice Bourke

HMS Victoria was the lead ship in her class of two battleships of the Royal Navy. On 22 June 1893, she collided with HMS Camperdown near Tripoli, Lebanon, during manoeuvres and quickly sank, killing 358 crew members, including the commander of the British Mediterranean Fleet, Vice-Admiral Sir George Tryon. One of the survivors was executive officer John Jellicoe, later commander-in-chief of the British Grand Fleet at the Battle of Jutland.

== Design ==
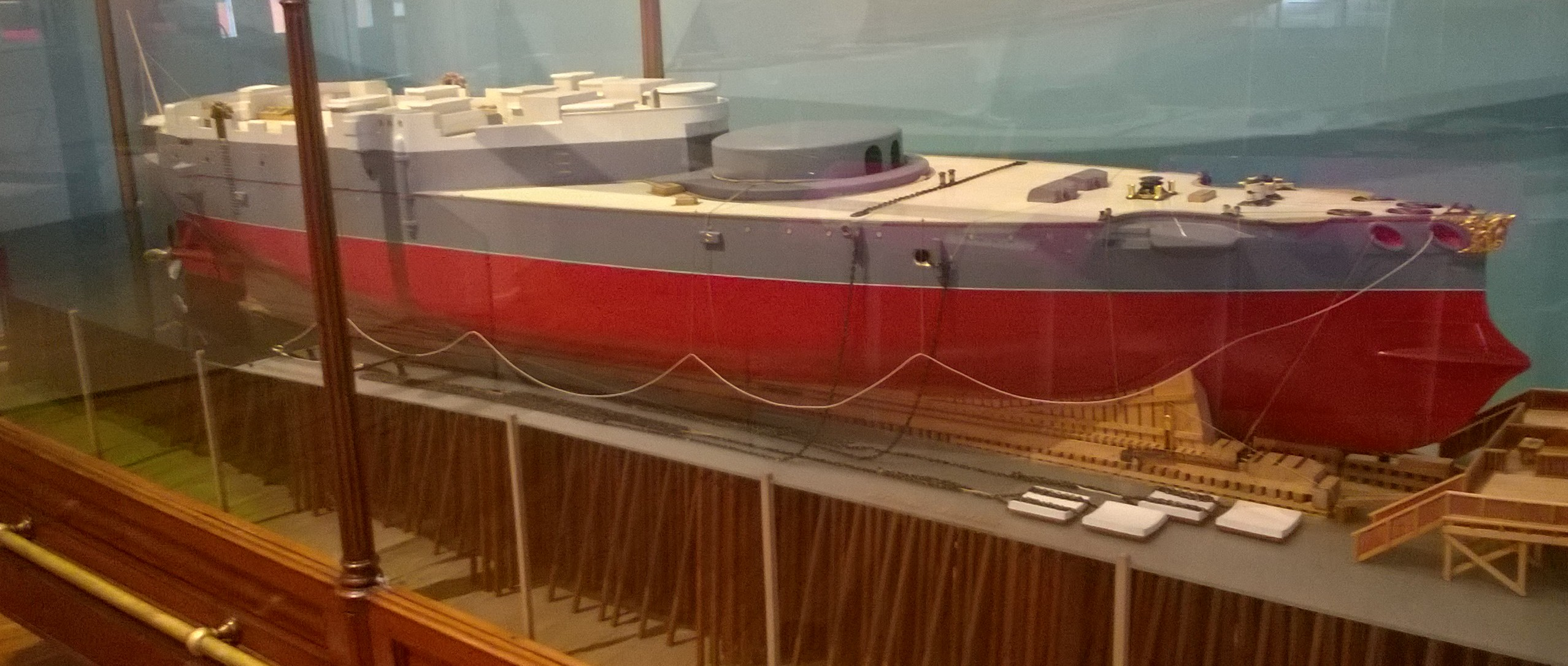
Scale model of Victoria, as she was when launched in 1887 from Elswick, located in the Discovery Museum in Newcastle-Upon-Tyne

Victoria was constructed at a time of innovation and rapid development in ship design. Her name was originally to be Renown, but this was changed to Victoria while still under construction to celebrate Queen Victoria's Golden Jubilee, which took place the year the ship was launched. Her arrival was accompanied by considerable publicity. She was the largest, fastest and most powerful ironclad afloat, with the heaviest guns.

She was the first battleship to be propelled by triple-expansion steam engines. These were constructed by Humphrys, Tennant and Company of Deptford and had cylinders of diameters 43 in (1,100 mm), 62 in (1,600 mm) and 96 in (2,400 mm) with stroke of 4 ft 3 in (1.30 m). They produced 12,000 ihp (8,900 kW) under forced draught, or 7,500 ihp (5,600 kW) under open draught. She was also the first Royal Navy ship to be equipped with a steam turbine which was used to run a dynamo.

A detailed model of the ship was exhibited at the Royal Navy exhibition in 1892, and another in silver was given to Queen Victoria by the officers of the Royal Navy and Royal Marines as a Jubilee gift.

=== Design limitations ===
Despite the ship's many impressive features, compromises in the design meant that she proved less than successful in service.

The ship was nicknamed 'the Slipper' (or when with her sister ship Sans Pareil, also attached to the Mediterranean squadron, 'the pair of Slippers') because of a tendency for her low foredeck to disappear from view in even slight seas, and especially, as a result of the low forward deck and raised aft superstructure, for the two ships' humorously perceived resemblance to the indoor footwear.

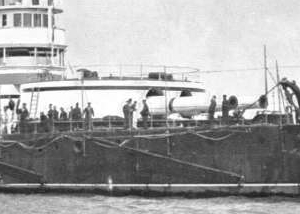
Turret on Sans Pareil

The forward deck held a single turret with two BL 16.25 in (413 mm) Mark I guns. The 16.25 in (413 mm) gun was chosen because similar large guns had been used in foreign ships, and because of difficulties in obtaining the navy's preferred 13.5 in (340 mm) design. The great weight of the forward turret with its two guns meant that it had to be mounted low so as not to detract from the ship's stability, and that a similar large gun and turret could not be mounted aft. Instead, the after gun was a BL 10 in (250 mm) gun protected by a gun shield. The original plan was for main armament fore and aft, and the eventual layout, which followed that of the preceding ironclad battleship Conqueror, was a compromise that meant the ship could only fire her main armament sideways or forward. It was found that if the guns were fired directly forward, the recoil buckled the deck.

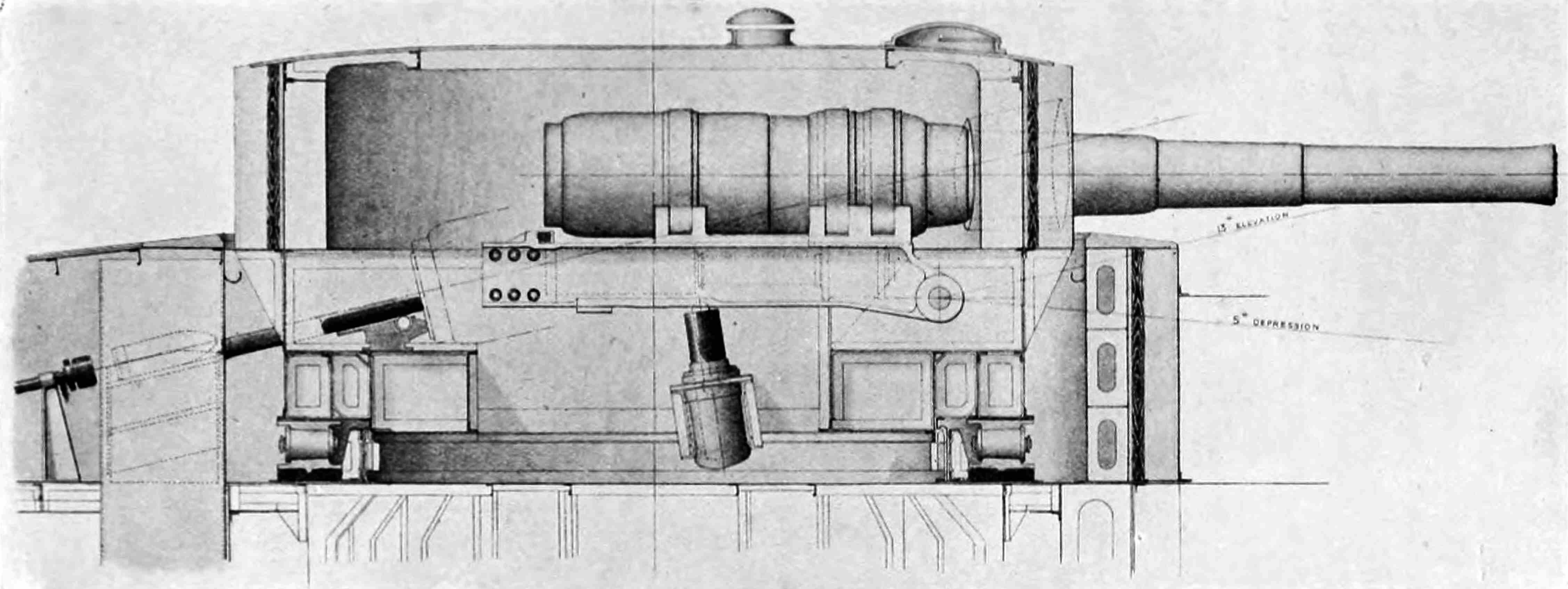
Section showing a BL 16.25 in (413 mm) gun. The weight of the guns contributed to instability of the ship and necessitated a low bow.

The gun barrels were found to be so heavy that they drooped when installed on their mountings, and could fire only 75 rounds before barrel wear became excessive.

Her main armour extended only along some 162 ft (49 m) of her total 340 ft (100 m) length varying from 16–18 in (41–46 cm) thick. By comparison, the French battleship Amiral Baudin, constructed at a similar time, had 21.5 in (55 cm) armour along her whole length. However, the British design produced a faster ship with greater range and larger guns.

== Captains and fleet commanders ==
Victoria was first commissioned in March 1890 by Captain J. E. Stokes, who took the ship to the Mediterranean. This crew then swapped ships with the crew of Camperdown, so that Captain J. C. Burnell now took command. The ship was now flagship of the Mediterranean squadron commanded by Vice-Admiral Sir Anthony Hoskins. In 1891, Sir George Tryon succeeded as fleet commander and Captain Maurice Bourke became the new flag captain onboard Victoria.

== 1892 grounding ==
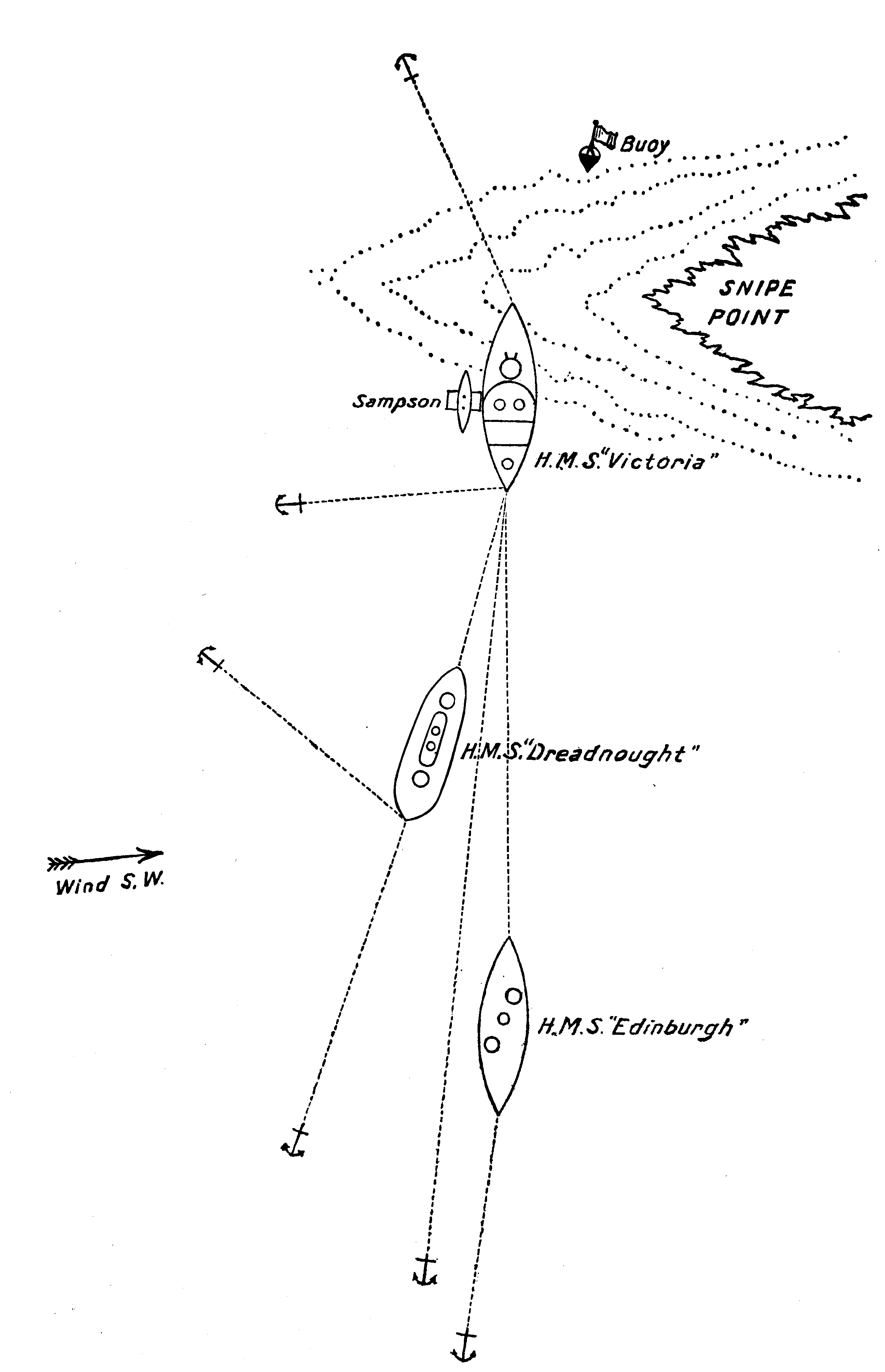
Position of ships for re-floating Victoria

On 29 January 1892, Victoria ran aground at Snipe Point near Platea on the Greek coast. Platea had been selected as a convenient friendly port for British ships to use as a base for exercises with torpedoes and mines, and each ship of the Mediterranean Fleet would go there in turn during the winter. Torpedoes would be launched from fast-moving ships in real battle conditions, but it was desirable to practise this in relatively shallow waters so that the torpedoes could be recovered afterwards (they were supposed to float once their motors stopped, but sometimes sank). Captain Bourke had appreciated the potential difficulties of operating his ship in shallow waters, and had ordered a crew to set out a buoy offshore at the place where the water shoaled to 60 ft (18 m). But the crew missed the shallowest point, and Victoria grounded on the rocky shoal at 9 kn (10 mph; 17 km/h) and stuck fast. The fore end of the ship ended up 7 ft (2.1 m) higher out of the water than would be normal, as momentum drove it up onto the shoal. The ship's bottom was damaged, and three compartments flooded. The stern, however, was still in 66 ft (20 m) of water. Admiral Tryon was notified and departed for the scene in Surprise, also ordering a dockyard tug Sampson with pumping equipment and hawsers. Hecla – a torpedo-depot ship – was already at Platea and made two attempts to tow Victoria free. These failed, but she assisted with laying anchors to hold the rear of the ship steady until further help could arrive. Phaeton, Edinburgh, Dreadnought, Scout and Humber were also called to the scene.

Victoria was lightened by removing 1,253 long tons (1,273 t), including 475 long tons (483 t) of coal thrown overboard. The leaks were patched up by creating temporary bulkheads and using timber and Portland cement to block holes. Dreadnought and Edinburgh each had hawsers attached to Victoria so they could pull astern. Sampson was lashed alongside so that she could pull backwards, and Victoria's own engines were run astern. This was sufficient to move the ship, and she was refloated on the evening of 4 February.

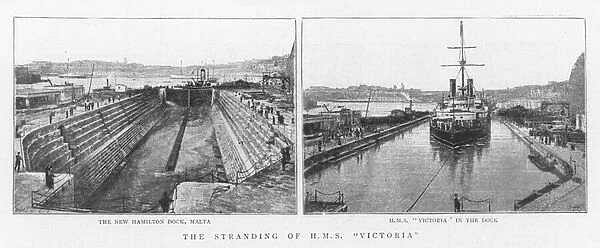
Victoria in the dry dock at Malta. The Graphic 1892

The ship proceeded to the new Hamilton Dock in Malta for repairs, being the first ship to use it. The hull plating was ripped and torn for a distance of 70 ft (21 m), with some plates being folded into 'S' shapes, although the mild steel bent rather than cracked. Repairs were completed in time for the summer fleet cruise in May.

== Sinking ==
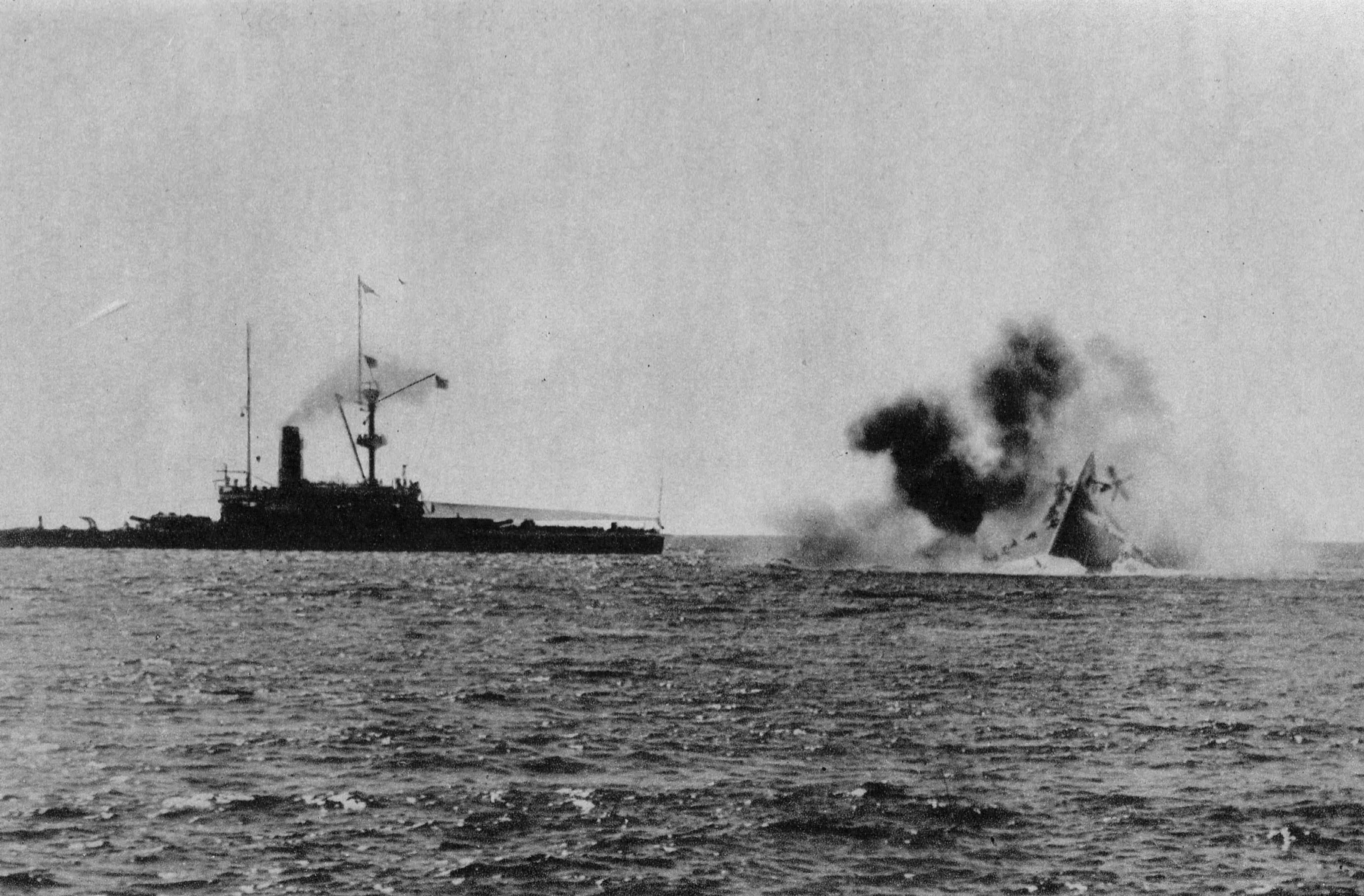
HMS Victoria sinking

On 22 June 1893, Victoria was leading the Mediterranean Fleet's "steam tactics" in the Eastern Mediterranean, an exercise consisting of a series of "equal speed" manoeuvres which had been developed, in part by Admiral Sir Phipps Hornby, to allow steam powered ships of different design to be handled in close company. Steam tactics were a product of an expectation that ironclads could provide fire to attack fortifications, but the long reload times and inaccuracy of rifled muzzle-loading guns meant that larger ships would have to operate en masse, inshore, and possibly in shallower waters than they previously had in order to meet this capability.

Victoria was at the head of a division of ships with Tryon onboard, while 1,200 yards (1,100 m) to starboard was a second division of five ships led by HMS Camperdown. Admiral Tryon ordered a manoeuvre that was to see each ship turn, one after the other in formation, to steam in the opposite direction. However, with the ships just 1,200 yards apart, and an estimated minimum turning circle of at least 1,600 yards (1,500 m), Victoria, the first ship to turn, was struck by the armoured ram of Camperdown as it turned, causing massive damage to the flagship. Victoria sank in approximately 15 minutes, with 358 members of the crew, including Admiral Tryon, lost.

== Wreck site ==
After a search that lasted ten years, the wreck was discovered on 22 August 2004 in 140 metres (460 ft) of water by the Lebanese-Austrian diver Christian Francis, aided by the British diver Mark Ellyatt. She stands vertically with the bow and some 30 metres (98 ft) of her length buried in the mud, with the stern pointing directly upwards towards the surface. This position is not unique among shipwrecks as first thought, as the Russian monitor Rusalka also rests like this. The unusual attitude of this wreck is thought to have been due to the heavy single turret forward containing the main armament coupled with the still-turning propellers driving the wreck downwards.

== Bibliography ==
- Chesneau, Roger; Koleśnik, Eugène M.; Campbell, N.J.M. (1979). Conway's All the World's Fighting Ships 1860–1905. London: Conway Maritime Press. ISBN 0-85177-133-5.
- Bennett, Geoffrey (1968). Charlie B: A Biography of Admiral Lord Beresford of Metemmeh and Curraghmore. London: Peter Dawnay Ltd.
- Andrew Gordon, The Rules of the Game: Jutland and British Naval Command, John Murray.
- David Brown, Warrior to Dreadnought: Warship development 1860–1905, Chatham Publishing.
- Fraser, Kenneth (2020). "Warship Notes: An Unpublished Account of the Loss of HMS Victoria". In Jordan, John (ed.). Warship 2020. Oxford, UK: Osprey. pp. 192–194. ISBN 978-1-4728-4071-4.
- Richard Hough, Admirals in Collision, Hamish Hamilton, London. Copyright 1959.
- Parkes, Oscar (1990) [1957]. British Battleships. Annapolis, Maryland: Naval Institute Press. ISBN 1-55750-075-4.
- Louis Decimus Rubin, The Summer the Archduke Died: Essays on Wars and Warriors, University of Missouri Press, [2008], ISBN 0-8262-1810-5
- Rear-Admiral C. C. Penrose Fitzgerald, Life of Vice-Admiral Sir George Tryon K.C.B., William Blackwood and sons, Edinburgh and London, 1897
- The Times, The Loss of HMS Victoria, 2 November 1893, page 4, issue 34098, column A. (Admiralty minutes describing the sinking)
- Minutes of Proceedings at a Court-Martial held on board her Majesty's ship Hibernia at Malta, on Monday, the seventeenth day of July 1893; and by adjournment, every day thereafter (Sunday excepted) to the Twenty-seventh day of July 1893, to enquire into the loss of her Majesty's ship Victoria , Her Majesty's Stationery Office, printed by Darling & son Ltd, 1893.
- Thursfield, James R. (1894). "Chapter XI: The Loss of H.M.S. Victoria". In Brassey, T. A. (ed.). The Naval Annual, 1894. Portsmouth, UK: J. Griffin and Co. pp. 164–178.
