= BL 16.25-inch Mk I naval gun =

Ordnance BL 16.25 inch gun Mk I
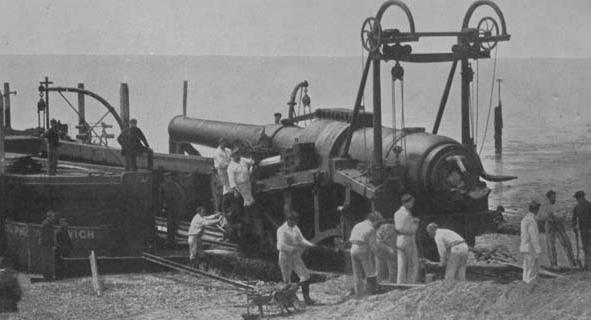
- Type: Naval gun
- Place of origin: United Kingdom

Service history
- In service: 1888 – 1909?
- Used by: Royal Navy

Production history
- Manufacturer: Elswick Ordnance Company
- No. built: 12
- Variants: no two guns were identical

Specifications
- Mass: 111 tons
- Length: 43 ft 7 in; 13.3 m
- Barrel length: 40 ft 8 in; 12.4 m bore (30 calibres)
- Shell: 1,800 lb (820 kg) Armour-piercing, Common, or Shrapnel
- Calibre: 16.25 in (413 mm)
- Elevation: -5° – 13°
- Rate of fire: about one round every three minutes
- Muzzle velocity: 2,087 feet per second (636 m/s)
- Maximum firing range: 12,000 yards (11,000 m)

The Elswick BL 16.25 inch naval gun was an early British superheavy rifled breech-loading naval gun, commonly known as the (Elswick) 110-ton gun or 111-ton gun.

== Service ==
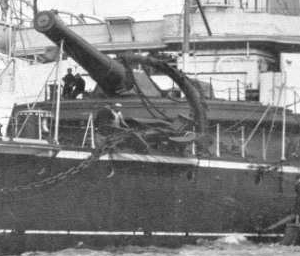
Forward barbette on HMS Benbow

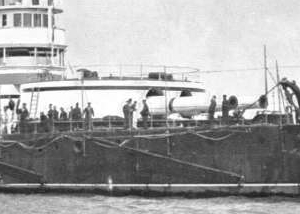
Turret on HMS Sans Pareil

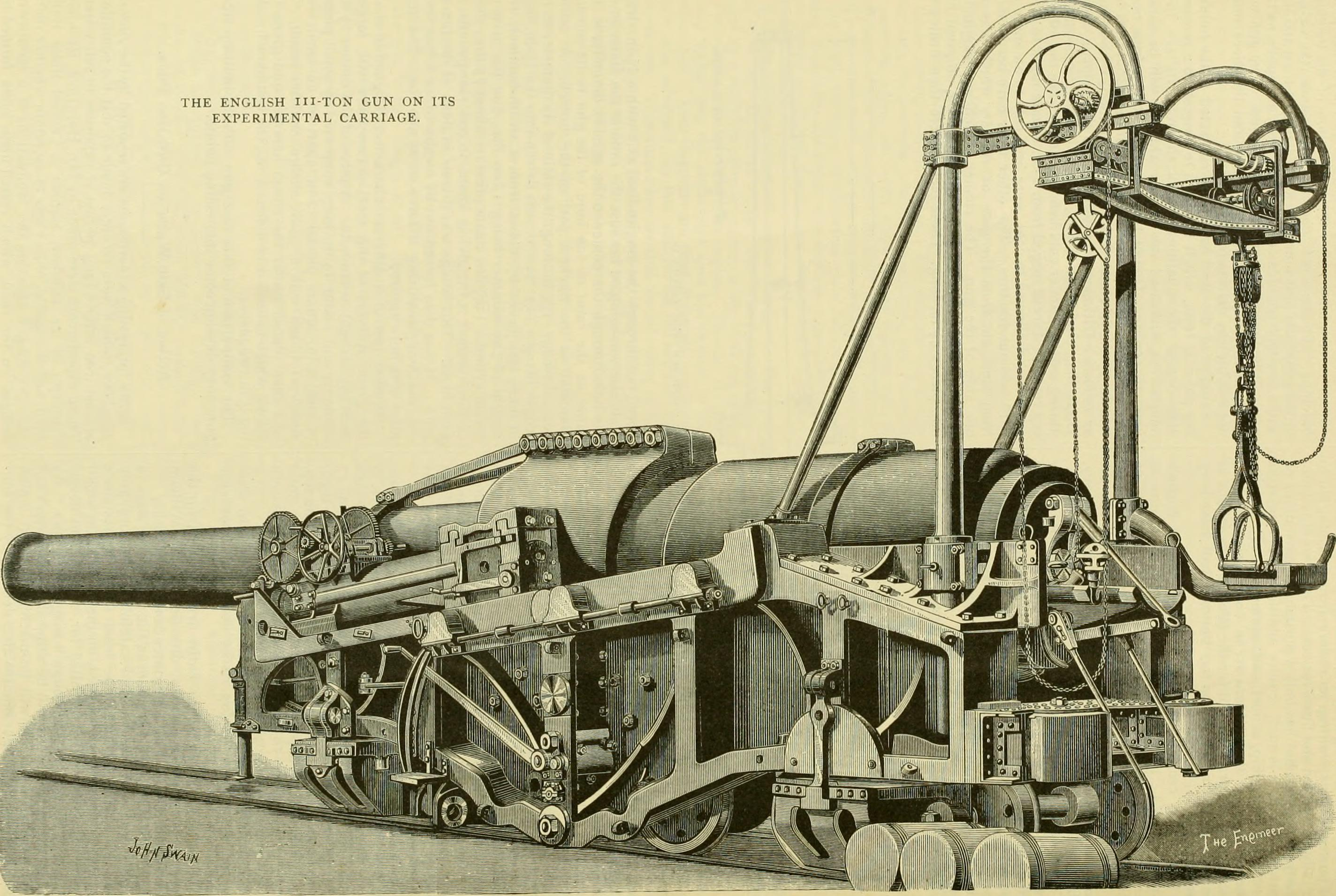
111-ton gun on proof mount

Elswick had already supplied similar guns to Italy's Regia Marina and fitted in the Italian ironclad Andrea Doria of 1885 and the Royal Navy required parity for its Mediterranean Fleet. The adoption of this gun was influenced by the slow rate of production of the preferred new 13.5-inch (343 mm) guns: the Royal Navy had the option of delaying the completion of the new Admiral-class ironclads until sufficient 13.5-inch guns were available to equip them with four guns in two twin barbettes as planned; to use 12-inch (305 mm) guns, or to equip them with the new 16.25-inch (413 mm) guns.

The decision made was to install 16.25-inch guns in HMS Benbow in 1887 in single barbettes fore and aft, each gun substituting for two 13.5-inch guns. For the following HMS Victoria and HMS Sans Pareil the 16.25-inch guns were mounted in pairs in a single turret placed forward.

Weaknesses such as droop and cracking were discovered in the early design, and the many subsequent changes meant that none of the twelve guns built were identical, so the Mk I denomination was discontinued and the individual guns were referred to by their serial numbers. The great weight, low rate of fire and short life of less than 75 rounds meant that the guns were unsuccessful and never fired in action.

== Ammunition ==
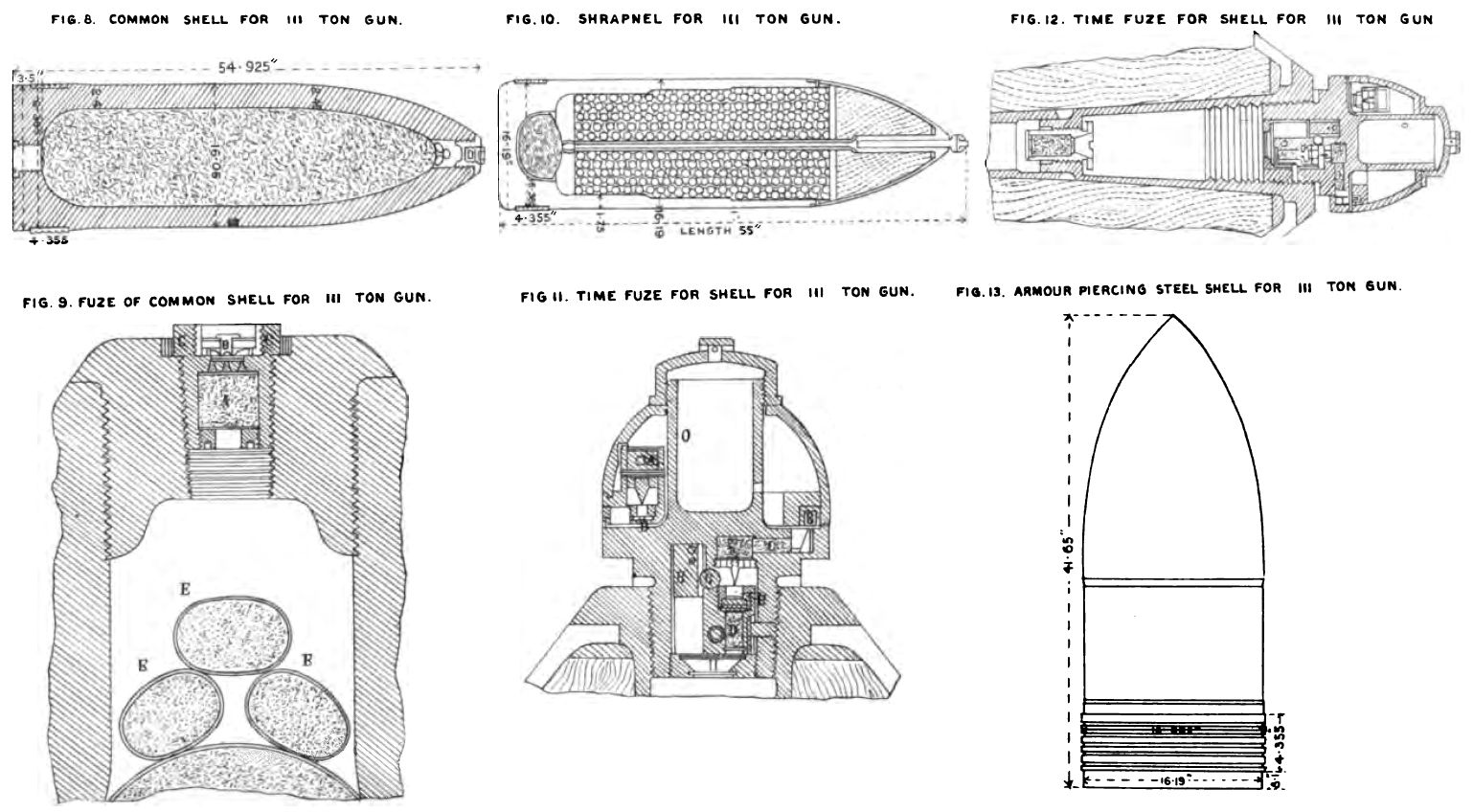
Diagrams of common, shrapnel and armour-piercing projectiles and their fuzes for the gun

== See also ==
- List of naval guns
