= HMS Benbow (1885) =

Admiral-class battleship

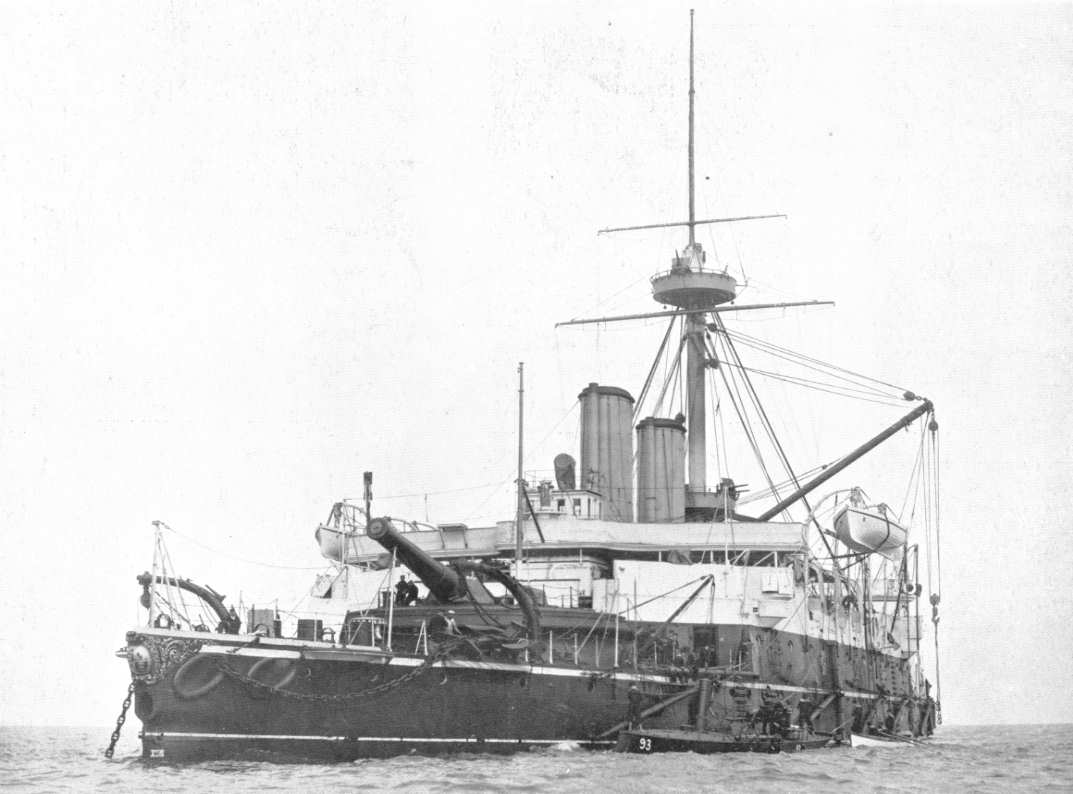
- HMS Benbow, photographed from her port bow.

History

United Kingdom
- Name: HMS Benbow
- Namesake: Admiral John Benbow
- Builder: Thames Ironworks and Shipbuilding Co. Ltd
- Laid down: 1 November 1882
- Launched: 15 June 1885
- Completed: June 1888
- Commissioned: 14 June 1888
- Fate: Broken up, 1909

General characteristics
- Class & type: Admiral-class battleship
- Displacement: 10,600 tons
- Length: 330 ft (100 m)
- Beam: 68 ft 6 in (20.88 m)
- Draught: 27 ft 10 in (8.48 m)
- Propulsion: Two-shaft Maudslay compound inverted 8,658 ihp (6,456 kW) normal, 10,860 ihp (8,100 kW) forced draught
- Speed: 15.7 knots (29 km/h) normal, 17.5 knots (32 km/h) forced draught
- Complement: 523
- Armament: Two BL 16.25-inch (412.8 mm) guns; Ten BL 6-inch (152.4 mm) guns; Twelve 6-pounder; Five 14 inch above-water torpedo tubes
- Armour: Belt: 18–8 in (457–203 mm); Bulkheads: 16–7 in (406–178 mm); Barbettes: 11.5–10 in (292–254 mm); Conning Tower: 12–2 in (305–51 mm); Deck: 3–2 in (76–51 mm)

HMS Benbow was a Victorian era Admiral-class battleship of the British Royal Navy, named for Admiral John Benbow. Completed in 1888, Benbow spent the majority of her career in reserve with only brief spurts as part of the active fleet. The battleship was scrapped in 1909.

== Design ==
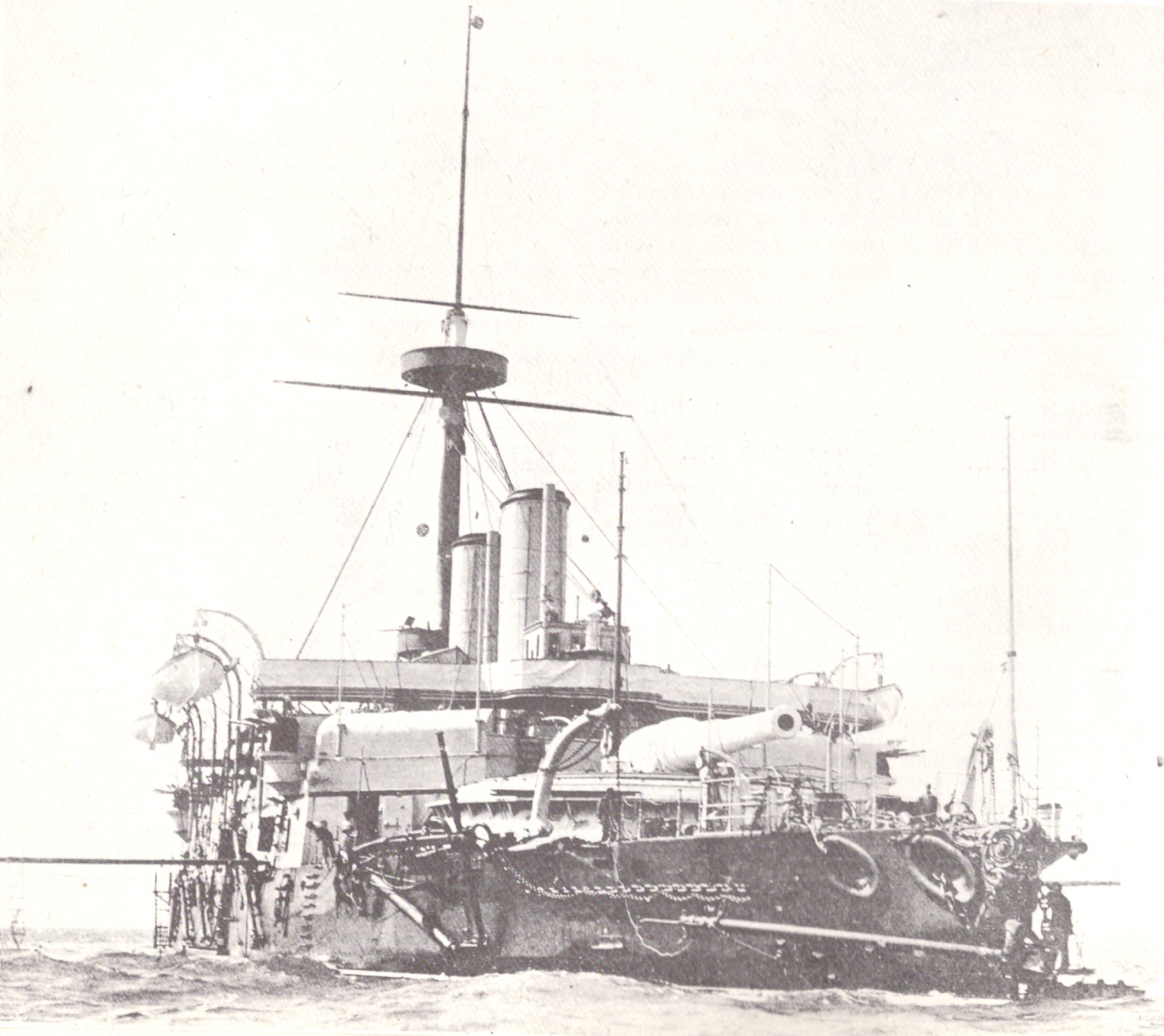
A starboard bow view of Benbow, prominently displaying her forward 16.25-inch (413 mm) 110-ton breech-loading rifle mounted in an open-topped barbette.

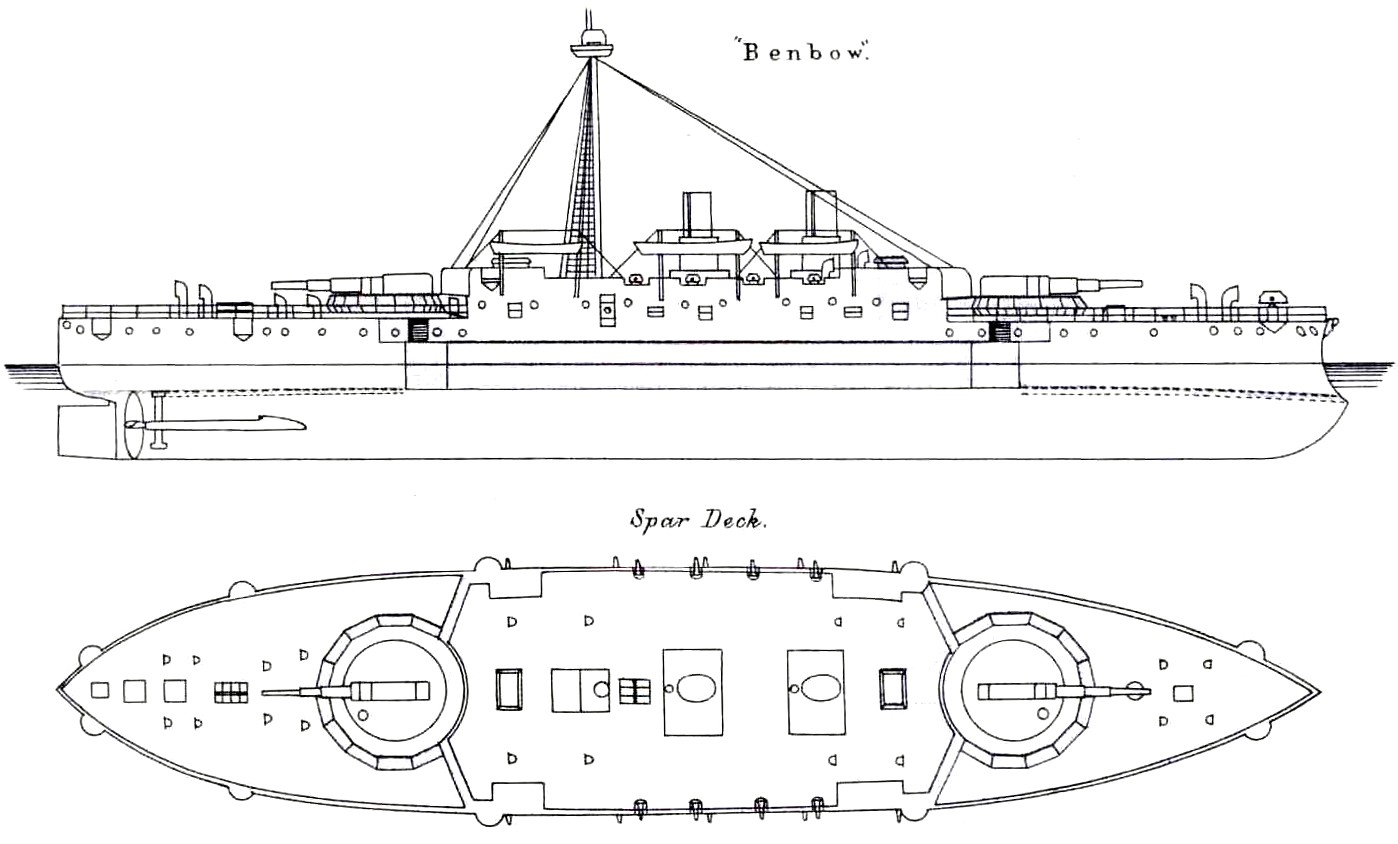
Starboard elevation and deck plan

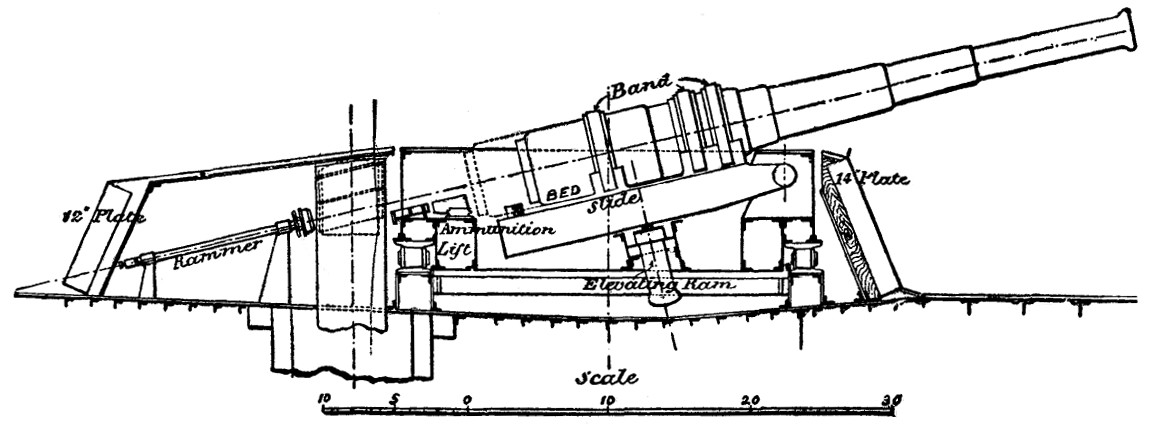
Right elevation of 16.25-inch gun mounting

With the exception of her armament she was a repeat of HMS Anson and HMS Camperdown. The contract for her construction was awarded to Thames Ironworks, and stipulated delivery within three years. At the time of her construction and indeed for many years afterwards, the limiting factor in battleship construction was the great length of time taken to manufacture heavy artillery, and it was recognised that the gun of 13.5 inch calibre, scheduled to be installed in the other ships of the class, was and would remain in short supply. The shipyard was therefore faced with the choice of either reverting to armament of 12 inches calibre, which was available but which was seen as inferior to guns mounted in contemporary foreign ships, or mounting the new Elswick BL 16.25-inch gun. Although contemporary guns of 12 inches calibre were perfectly able to destroy any ship afloat, the larger guns were chosen, and mounted singly in barbettes positioned at either end of the superstructure. With the exception of the 18 inch armament mounted in HMS Furious and in some monitors, these were the largest calibre guns ever mounted in a ship of the Royal Navy. One of these pieces nevertheless weighed less than a pair of 13.5 inch guns, and the weight saved was used to increase the number of 6 inch guns in the broadside battery. The big guns were not a wholly satisfactory substitute for the armament in their sister-ships. They were slow to load, the rate of fire being only one round every four to five minutes; the chance of hitting the target, being a function of the number of guns in use, was reduced; there was a tendency for the muzzle to droop; and the barrel liner lasted only for some seventy-five rounds, when replacement was a difficult and time-consuming operation.

== Construction ==
Benbow was laid down at Thames Iron Work's Blackwall shipyard on 1 November 1882. She was launched by Catherine Gladstone, wife of former Prime Minister William Gladstone, on 15 June 1885, and was completed in June 1888.

== Service history ==
She was commissioned on 14 June 1888 for the Mediterranean Fleet, with which she served until October 1891. She was then held in the Reserve until March 1894, with two short commissions to take part in manoeuvres. From 1894 until April 1904, she served as guardship at Greenock. Captain Richard Penrose Humpage was in command from September 1899, succeeded by Captain Francis Raymond Pelly in June 1901. According to 1901 Census (2 April 1901)( RG13: Piece: 2114 Folio: 163) HMS Benbow was in the Reserve Fleet off Keyham Dockyard Devonport. She took part in the fleet review held at Spithead on 16 August 1902 for the coronation of King Edward VII. She remained in the Reserve until sold to Thos. W. Ward in 1909.

== Bibliography ==
- Friedman, Norman (2018). British Battleships of the Victorian Era. Annapolis, Maryland: Naval Institute Press. ISBN 978-1-68247-329-0.
- Lyon, David & Winfield, Rif (2004). The Sail & Steam Navy List: All the Ships of the Royal Navy 1815–1889. London: Chatham Publishing. ISBN 1-86176-032-9.
- Parkes, Oscar (1990) [1957]. British Battleships. Annapolis, Maryland: Naval Institute Press. ISBN 1-55750-075-4.
- Chesneau, Roger; Kolesnik, Eugene M., eds. (1979). Conway's All the World's Fighting Ships 1860–1905. London: Conway Maritime Press. ISBN 0-85177-133-5.
