= HMS Camperdown (1885) =

Admiral-class battleship of the Royal Navy

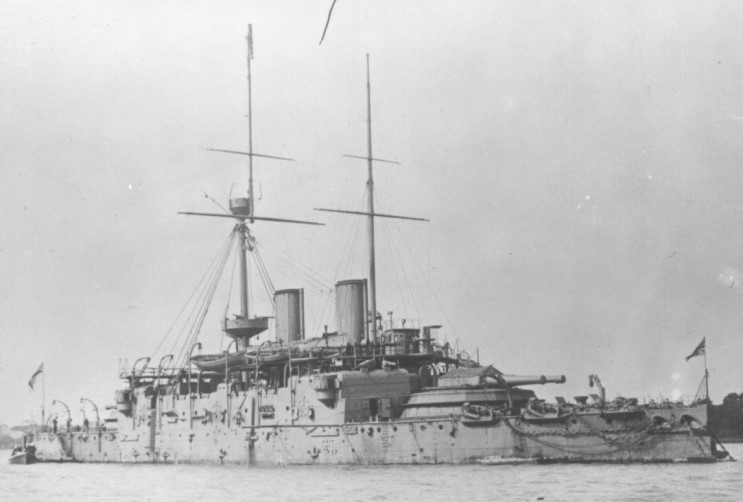
- HMS Camperdown

History

United Kingdom
- Name: HMS Camperdown
- Namesake: Admiral Adam Duncan, 1st Viscount Duncan of Camperdown
- Builder: Portsmouth Dockyard
- Laid down: 18 December 1882
- Launched: 24 November 1885
- Completed: July 1889
- Fate: Sold 1911; broken up

General characteristics
- Class & type: Admiral-class battleship
- Displacement: 10,600 long tons (10,800 t)
- Length: 330 ft (100 m)
- Beam: 68 ft 6 in (20.88 m)
- Draught: 27 ft 3 in (8.31 m) maximum
- Installed power: 7,500 ihp (5,600 kW) (normal); 11,500 ihp (8,600 kW) (forced draught)
- Propulsion: 2 × Maudslay compound inverted steam engines; 2 × screws
- Speed: 17.1 kn (19.7 mph; 31.7 km/h) (forced draught)
- Complement: 530
- Armament: 4 × BL 13.5-inch (343 mm) guns; 4 × BL 6-inch (152 mm) guns; 12 × QF 6-pounder (57 mm) Nordenfelt guns; 10 × 3-pounder quick-firing guns; 5 × 14 inch above-water torpedo tubes
- Armour: Belt: 18 in (46 cm) (upper strake); 8 in (20 cm) (lower strake); Bulkheads: 7–16 in (178–406 mm); Barbettes: 10–11.5 in (25–29 cm); Conning tower: 2–12 in (5.1–30.5 cm); Battery screens: 6 in (15 cm); Deck: 2.5–3 in (6.4–7.6 cm) (upper); 2.5 in (6.4 cm) (lower)

HMS Camperdown was an Admiral-class battleship of the Royal Navy, named after Adam Duncan, 1st Viscount Duncan of Camperdown.

== Design ==
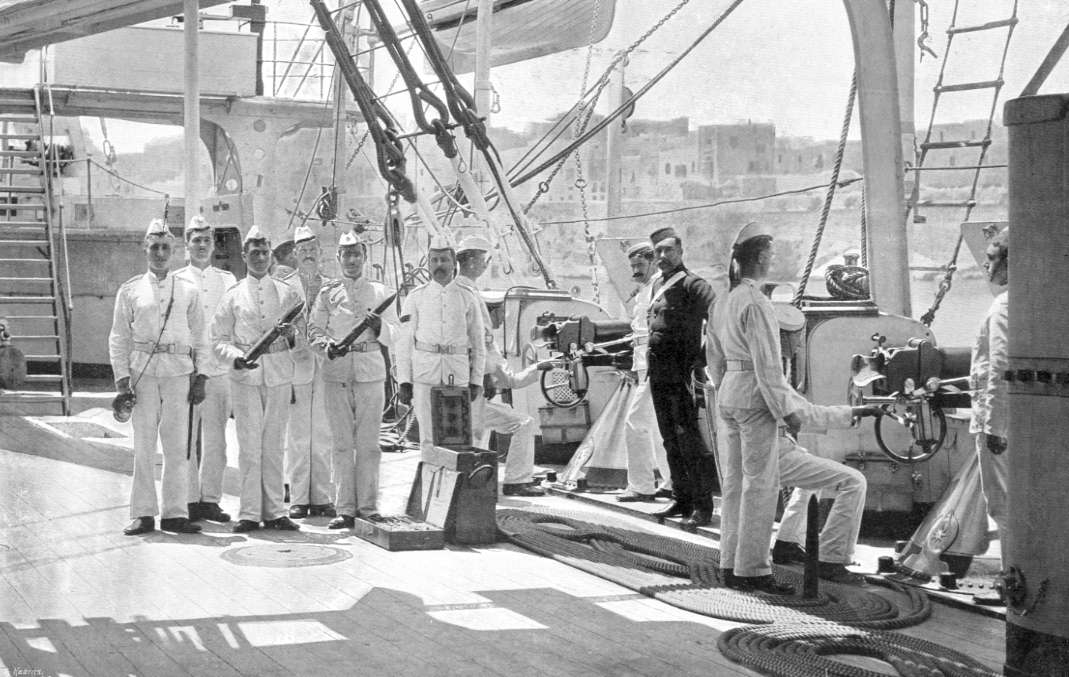
Gun drill aboard Camperdown with the QF 6-pounder Nordenfelt guns

She was a full sister to Anson, and was an improved version of the earlier Howe and Rodney. In comparison to these earlier ships, she had an increased thickness of barbette armour, and a lengthened armour belt. The extra armour carried increased the displacement by 350 long tons (360 t); in order not to increase the draught, she was lengthened by 5 ft (1.5 m) and was given 6 in (15 cm) more beam.

The 13.5 in (340 mm) guns were carried in two pairs, in barbettes positioned on the centre-line at either end of the superstructure. They were carried at a height of 20 ft (6.1 m) above the full-load water-line, and possessed firing arcs of some 270°. Each shell weighed 1,250 lb (570 kg), and would penetrate 27 in (69 cm) of iron at a range of 1,000 yd (910 m).

== History ==
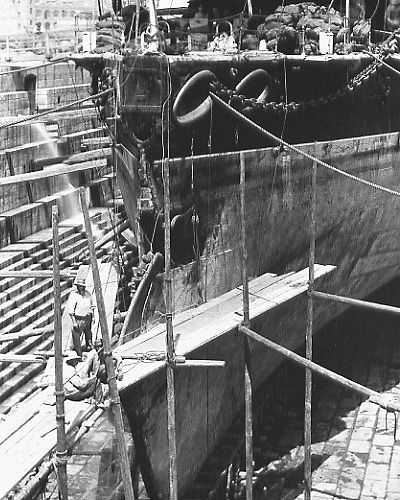
Camperdown's damaged bow after her 22 June 1893 collision with battleship Victoria.

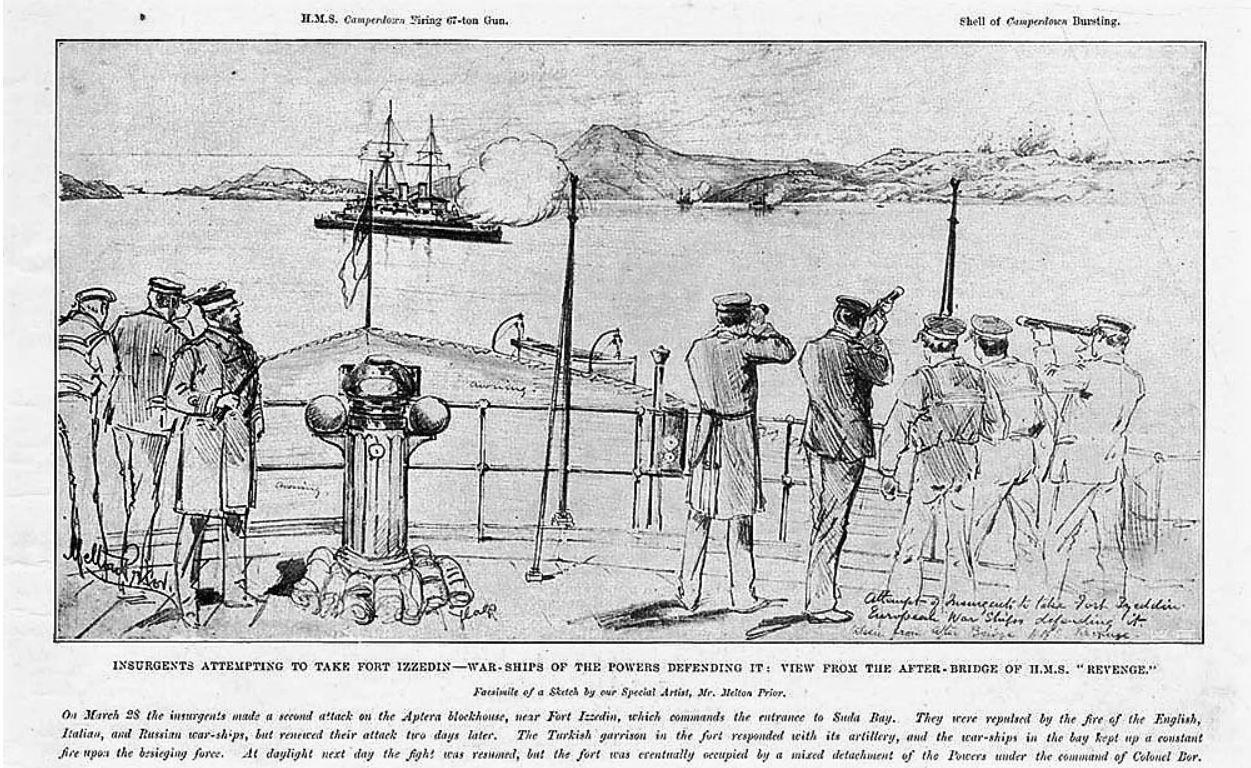
Sketch by Melton Prior of Camperdown firing her 13.5-inch (343 mm) guns at Cretan insurgents attacking Izzeddin Fortress on Crete on 26–27 March 1897 as seen from HMS Revenge.

Camperdown was commissioned at Portsmouth on 18 July 1889, and initially went into reserve. In December 1889 she was posted to the Mediterranean Fleet as flagship, where she remained until being posted as flagship of the Channel Fleet in May 1890. She was paid off in May 1892 into Fleet reserve, recommissioning in July 1892 into the Mediterranean Fleet. On 22 June 1893, she collided with and sank the battleship HMS Victoria with 358 deaths, including Vice-Admiral Sir George Tryon.

In 1897, Camperdown arrived off Crete to join the International Squadron, a multinational force made up of ships of the Austro-Hungarian Navy, French Navy, Imperial German Navy, Italian Royal Navy (Regia Marina), Imperial Russian Navy, and Royal Navy that intervened in the 1897–1898 insurrection of Cretan Christians against the Ottoman Empire. On 26 and 27 March 1897, she fired her guns in anger for the first time – including four 1,250-pound (570 kg) rounds from her 13.5-inch (343 mm) guns – bombarding Christian insurgents besieging the Ottoman-held Izzeddin Fortress near the entrance to Suda Bay. Firing at a range of 5,000 yards (4,600 m), she forced the insurgents to abandon their siege. On 21 April 1897, she anchored off Canea (now Chania) – where Ottoman troops, Cretan Turk civilians, and a force of British and Italian soldiers were besieged by an estimated 60,000 insurgents – to deter insurgents who had begun a demonstration with two artillery pieces that threatened the town. In response to a violent riot by Cretan Turks at Candia (now Heraklion) the previous day, she arrived at Candia on 7 September 1898 to reinforce the occupation forces there and put a contingent of Royal Marines ashore. After the local Ottoman governor refused to meet various British demands during a meeting aboard the British flagship, the battleship HMS Revenge, in Candia′s harbor on 13 September, Camperdown and Revenge conducted a demonstration that overcame his reluctance.

In September 1899, Camperdown went into Category B reserve, and in May 1900 into Dockyard reserve. In July 1900 she commissioned as a coast guard ship at Lough Swilly until May 1903. During early Summer (April to June) 1902 she visited Portsmouth for repairs to her steam capstan. She took part in the fleet review held at Spithead on 16 August 1902 for the coronation of King Edward VII. Captain Frederic Brock was temporarily in command for a month from 24 September until 7 November 1902, when Captain Frederick Owen Pike took command. After paying off in 1903, she was in reserve at Chatham until 1908, and was employed at Harwich as a berthing ship for submarines until she was sold in 1911.
