= International Squadron (Cretan intervention, 1897–1898) =

- Illustration as it appeared in The Graphic on 13 March 1897 of warships of the International Squadron bombarding Christian insurgents above Chania, Crete, on 21 February 1897. It is probably reversed.
- Active: February 1897 – December 1898
- Country: Multinational: Austria-Hungary; French Republic; German Empire; Kingdom of Italy; Russian Empire; United Kingdom
- Type: Naval squadron
- Engagements: Cretan Revolt (1897–1898); Greco-Turkish War (1897)

The International Squadron was a naval squadron formed by a number of Great Powers in early 1897, just before the outbreak of the Greco-Turkish War of 1897, to intervene in a native Greek rebellion on Crete against rule by the Ottoman Empire. Warships from Austria-Hungary, France, the German Empire, Italy, the Russian Empire, and the United Kingdom made up the squadron, which operated in Cretan waters from February 1897 to December 1898.

The senior admiral from each country present off Crete became a member of an "Admirals Council" – also called the "Council of Admirals" and "International Council" – charged with managing the affairs of Crete, a role the admirals played until December 1898. The most senior admiral among those in Cretan waters served both as overall commander of the International Squadron and as the council's president. Initially, Italian Vice Admiral Felice Napoleone Canevaro (1838–1926) served in these roles. When Canevaro left the International Squadron in mid-1898, French Rear Admiral Édouard Pottier (1839–1903) succeeded him as overall commander of the squadron and president of the council.

During the squadron's operations, it bombarded Crete, landed sailors and marines on the island, blockaded both Crete and some ports in Greece, and supported international occupation forces on the island. After Austria-Hungary and Germany withdrew from the squadron, the other four powers continued its operations. After the squadron brought fighting on Crete to an end, its admirals attempted to negotiate a peace settlement, ultimately deciding that a new Cretan State should be established on the island under the suzerainty of the Ottoman Empire. The squadron completed its work in November and December 1898 by removing all Ottoman forces from the island and transporting Prince George of Greece and Denmark (1869–1957) to Crete to serve as High Commissioner of the new Cretan State, bringing direct Ottoman rule of the island to an end.

== Background ==
In 1896, the Great Powers induced the Ottoman Empire to agree to institute reforms in the administration of the island of Crete – which the Ottomans had controlled since 1669 – to protect the interests of the island's Christian population, with whom many people in Greece sympathized. When the Ottomans failed to follow through on the reforms and massacred Christian inhabitants of Canea (Chania), Crete, on 23–24 January 1897, a revolt broke out on 25 January 1897 among the Cretan Christians with a goal of forcing the union of Crete with Greece. With the support of Greek Army troops deployed to the island and Greek Navy warships operating along its coast, the insurgents overran much of the countryside. Ottoman troops generally retained control of Crete's large towns and of isolated outposts scattered around the island.

Anxious to force the Ottomans to adhere to the agreement to institute the reforms promised in 1896 and to avoid a general war breaking out between Greece and the Ottoman Empire, which they feared would lead to an inevitable Greek defeat and might spread to become a general war in Europe, six Great Powers – Austria-Hungary, France, the German Empire, the Kingdom of Italy, the Russian Empire, and the United Kingdom – decided to intervene in the revolt so as to ensure that the reforms would take place. They placed pressure on the Ottomans not to reinforce their garrisons on Crete; in exchange, they took the responsibility for the general safety of the Ottoman garrisons already on the island.

== Formation of the squadron ==
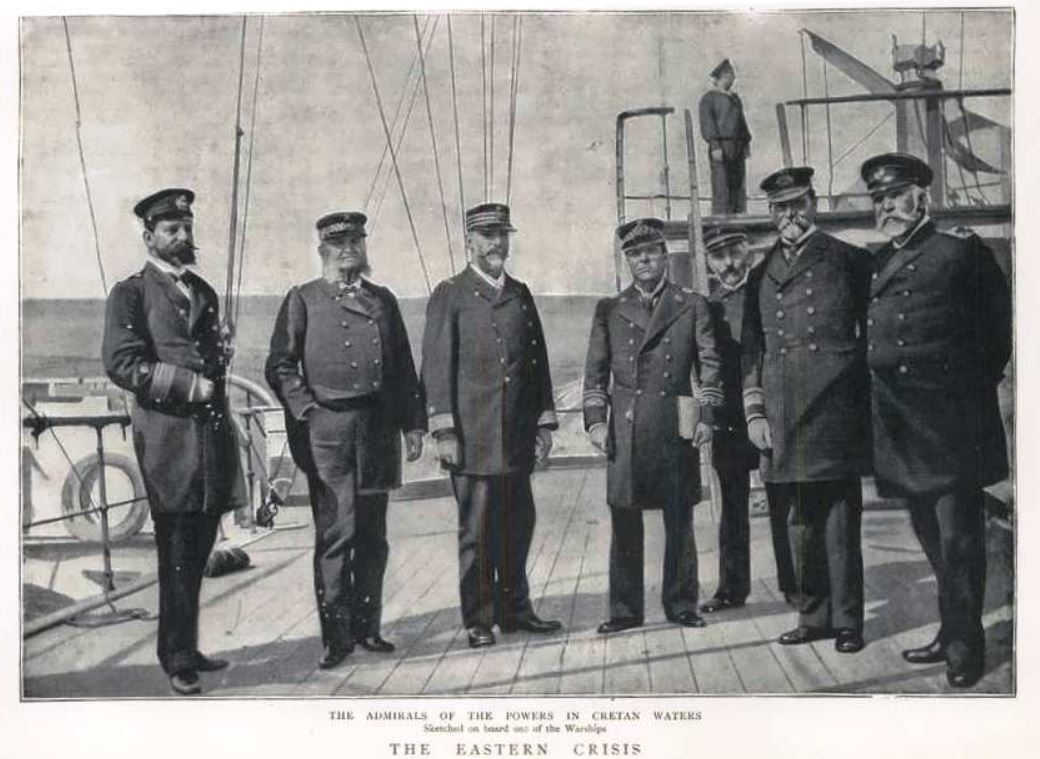
"The Admirals of the Powers in Cretan Waters" (Sketch from Black and White, 10 April 1897).

As early as May 1896, the British battleship HMS Hood and a French gunboat had arrived in Cretan waters to protect their countries′ interests and citizens in the face of unrest on Crete, and when major rioting broke out in Candia (now Heraklion) on 6 February 1897, men from the British warship on station, the battleship HMS Barfleur, intervened to bring the situation under control and to protect British subjects by bringing them aboard Barfleur. With the rapid deterioration of the situation on the island in early 1897, ships of the Austro-Hungarian Navy, French Navy, Italian Royal Navy (Regia Marina), Imperial Russian Navy, and British Royal Navy all arrived in Crete's waters in early February 1897 as a show of naval might intended to demonstrate the commitment of the Great Powers to an end of fighting on Crete and an arrangement that would protect Christians on the island without separating it from the Ottoman Empire. The first British warships to join Barfleur – led by the battleships HMS Revenge, the flagship of Rear-Admiral Robert Harris, and HMS Rodney – arrived on 9 February 1897; by 13 February, Austro-Hungarian, French, Italian, and Russian warships had anchored off Crete and Germany had committed to establishing a naval presence there. Anchoring in the harbor at Canea (now Chania), the squadrons soon combined to form the International Squadron, and the admirals commanding the various national contingents began working together to address matters on the island.

== Operations ==
=== Early actions ===
==== Greek intervention ====
While the six powers negotiated over what additional steps their naval forces off Crete should take, Greece took action to support the Cretan Christian insurgents. The Greek Navy ironclad Hydra arrived off Crete in early February 1897, nominally to protect Greek interests and citizens on Crete, and on 12 February a Greek Navy squadron consisting of the steam sloop-of-war Sphacteria and four torpedo boats under the command of Prince George of Greece and Denmark (1869–1957) arrived at Canea with orders to support the Cretan insurrection and harass Ottoman shipping. The admirals of the International Squadron informed Prince George that they would use force if necessary to prevent any aggressive Greek actions in and around Crete, and Prince George's squadron departed Cretan waters on 13 February and steamed back to Greece. On the day that Prince George's squadron departed, the admirals received a report that Greek warships had chased and fired on an Ottoman steamship off Crete, and they informed the commander of the Greek Navy that they would not allow Greek ships to fire at Ottoman vessels in the island's waters. However, the situation continued to escalate on 14 February, when a Greek Army expeditionary force commanded by Colonel Timoleon Vassos (1836–1929) consisting of two battalions of Greek Army infantry – about 1,500 men – and two batteries of artillery landed at Platanias, west of Canea; Vassos declared that his troops had come to occupy Crete on behalf of the King of Greece and unilaterally proclaimed Greece's annexation of Crete. This prompted the island's Ottoman vali (governor), George Berovich (also known as Berovich Pasha) (1845–1897), to flee to Trieste on 14 February aboard the Russian battleship Imperator Nikolai I.

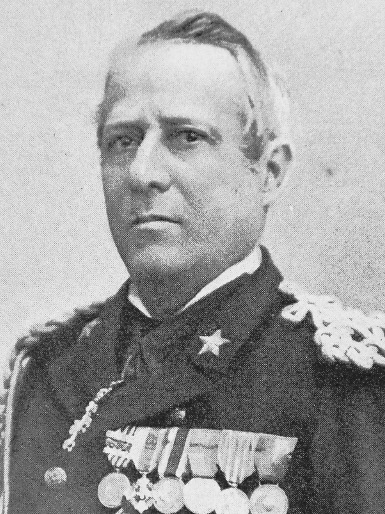
Italian Vice Admiral Felice Napoleone Canevaro (left) was the International Squadron′s first commander. French Rear Admiral Édouard Pottier (right) relieved him in mid-1898.

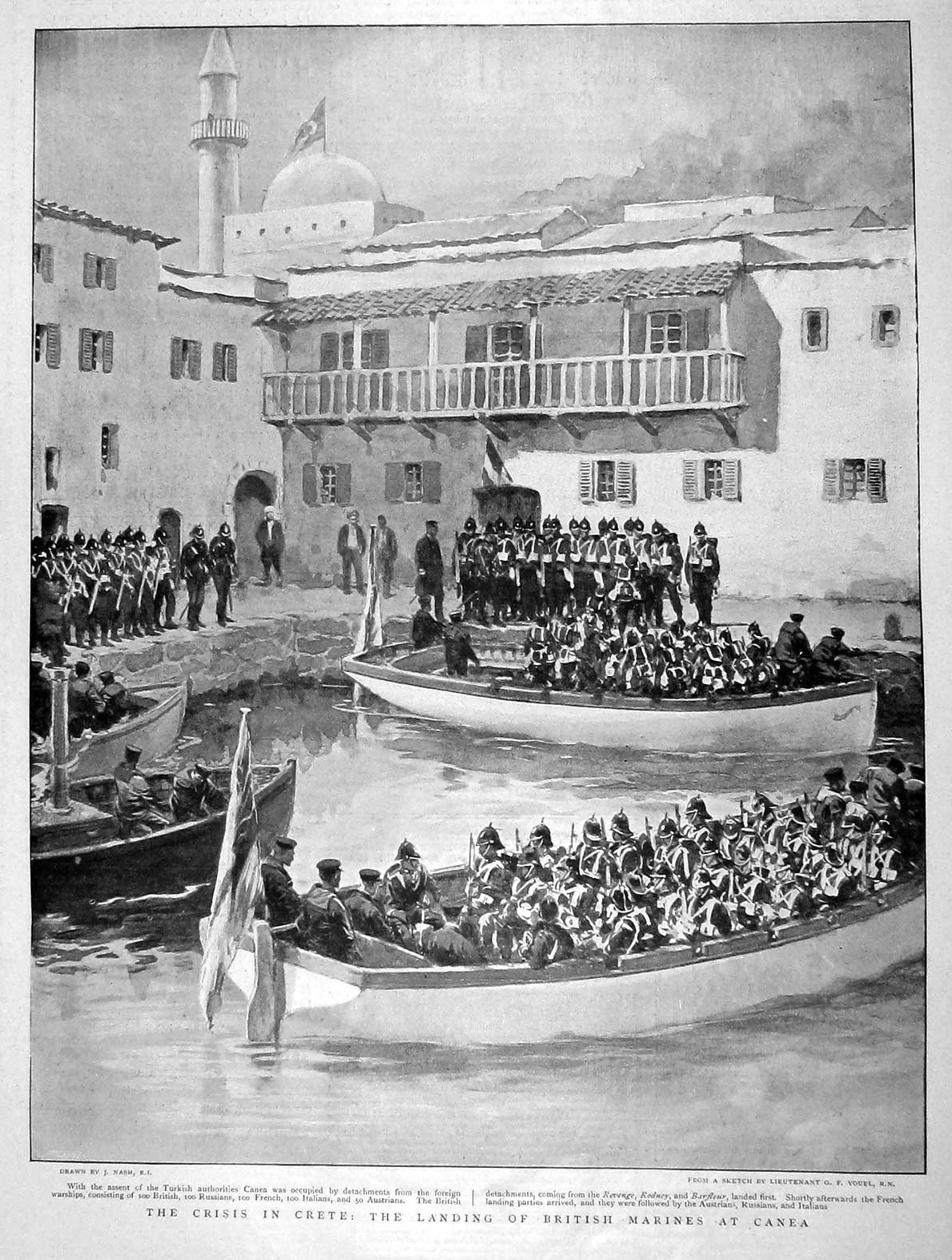
Illustration of Royal Marines landing at Canea on 15 February 1897 (Illustration from The Graphic, 6 March 1897).

Vassos's declaration was a direct challenge to both the Ottoman Empire and the Great Powers, and Berovich's departure left Crete with no functioning civil authority. To address both matters, the International Squadron took its first direct action on 15 February 1897 by landing 450 sailors and marines – 100 each from France, Italy, Russia, and the United Kingdom and 50 from Austria-Hungary – from the warships anchored in the harbor at Canea and raising the flags of all six of the Great Powers over Canea. This began both the international occupation of Crete and the role of the International Squadron's admirals in managing the island's affairs via the Admirals Council. When the first Imperial German Navy warship, the protected cruiser SMS Kaiserin Augusta, arrived off Crete on 21 February, she reinforced the International Squadron's occupying force ashore by landing an additional 50 men. Meanwhile, the International Squadron determined that the senior admiral present among the contingents of all six countries should serve as the squadron's overall commander, and accordingly Italian Vice Admiral Felice Napoleone Canevaro – on the scene in command of a Regia Marina squadron consisting of the battleships Sicilia (his flagship) and Re Umberto, the protected cruiser Vesuvio, and the torpedo cruiser Euridice – became the commander of the International Squadron on 16 or 17 February (sources vary); he also became president of the Admirals Council. The International Squadron ordered Vassos to come no closer than 6 kilometers (3 3/4 miles) to Canea, but he began operations intended to capture the town, leading to a clash on 19 February 1897 in which his expedition defeated a 4,000-man Ottoman force in the Battle of Livadeia. The International Squadron demanded that Vassos cease his operations against Canea and captured several storeships sent to supply him.

==== February bombardments ====
While Vassos's troops advanced on Canea from the west, Cretan insurgents armed with artillery provided by the Greek Army advanced on Canea from the direction of Akrotiri to the east and took control of the high ground east of Canea. The insurgent force – which included Eleftherios Venizelos (1864–1936), a future prime minister of Greece – threatened to shell Canea and carried out unsuccessful attacks on the town on 13 and 14 February that Ottoman troops and Muslim Bashi-bazouk irregulars repelled. On 21 February 1897, the insurgents hoisted a Greek flag over their position. When they ignored the International Squadron's order that day to take the flag down, disband, and disperse, Vice Admiral Canevaro ordered the squadron to bombard their positions, the squadron's first direct use of force. Although the French and Italian ships present were unable to participate because of other ships masking their fire, the British battleship HMS Revenge and torpedo gunboats HMS Dryad and HMS Harrier, the Russian battleship Imperator Aleksandr II, the Austro-Hungarian armored cruiser SMS Kaiserin und Königin Maria Theresia, and the newly arrived German protected cruiser Kaiserin Augusta bombarded the insurgent positions, Revenge receiving credit for firing three 6-inch (152-mm) shells into the farmstead serving as the insurgent base of operations. The shelling – which, according to the insurgents consisted of as many as 100 rounds – prompted the insurgents to take the Greek flag down, and the warships ceased fire after five to ten minutes. The insurgents withdrew without shelling Canea, suffering three killed and a number wounded. The insurgent Spiros Kayales became a Cretan hero when he grabbed the Greek flag after the International Squadron's gunfire had knocked it down twice and held it aloft himself. Cretan legend holds that Kayales's bravery so impressed the sailors of the International Squadron and aboard Greek ships offshore that cheers broke out aboard the French, Greek, and Italian warships anchored in the harbor; that Canevaro, seeing Kayales holding the flag up despite the shells bursting around him, ordered the ships to cease fire; and that the Admirals Council decided that Crete should have an autonomous government based on Kayales's actions. In fact, the closest ships were 4,700 yards (4,298 meters) away from the insurgent positions, too far for the insurgents to hear the cheers they reported from the warships, and the Admirals Council's eventual decision that Crete should have autonomy was based on international politics, their governments′ interests, and the state of negotiations with Cretan insurgent and Ottoman forces on the island rather than on any individual Cretan's bravery. Nonetheless, Cretans have celebrated Kayales's heroism every year on 9 February (the date of the incident on the Julian calendar then in use on Crete, which during the 19th century was twelve days behind the modern Gregorian calendar). Despite its success from a military standpoint, the "Bombardment of Akrotiri" and legend of Spyros Kayales had the deleterious effects on the Great Powers′ goals in Crete of further inflaming the nationalist passions of Cretan insurgents and misleading the island's Muslims into thinking that the International Squadron was operating in support of them rather than to prevent combat actions by either side.

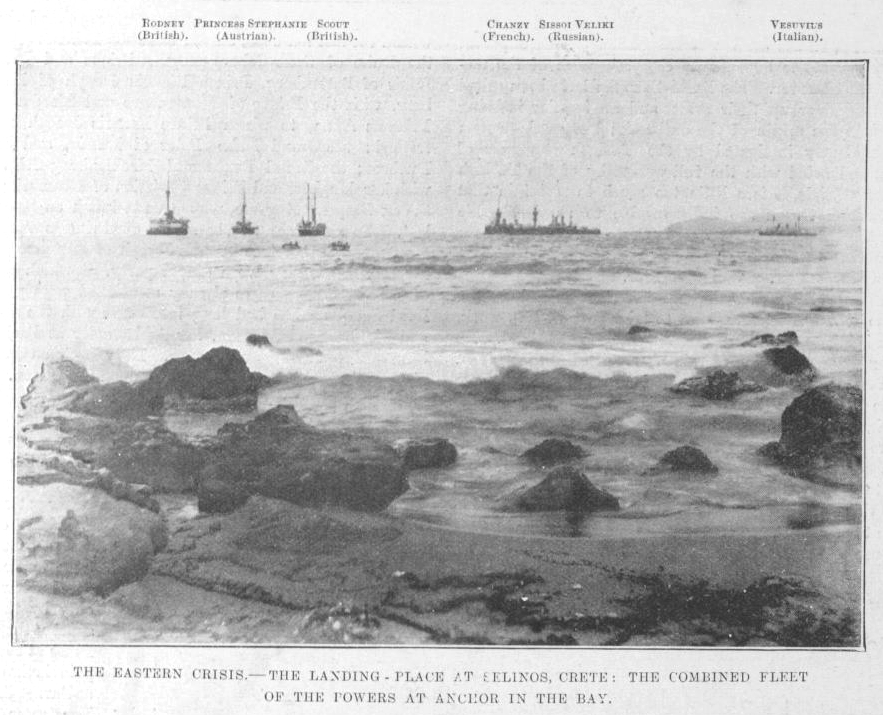
Ships of the International Squadron anchored off Selino Kastelli, Crete, while supporting the expedition to Kandanos. Left to right: The British battleship HMS Rodney, the Austro-Hungarian ironclad SMS Kronprinzessin Erzherzogin Stephanie, the British torpedo cruiser HMS Scout, the French armored cruiser Chanzy, the Russian battleship Sissoi Veliky, and the Italian protected cruiser Vesuvio.

With the greatest threat to Canea appearing to come from the east, the International Squadron by 26 February had concentrated most of its ships in Suda Bay, east of Canea, where they could fire on insurgent forces holding the Akrotiri Peninsula. The squadron's men ashore also began patrols to keep the paved road between Canea and Suda open. On 28 February 1897, insurgent forces mounted their first attack on the Ottoman-held blockhouse at Aptera on Malaxa Mountain overlooking Suda Bay; the blockhouse supported the Izzeddin Fortress, which in turn commanded the road. After receiving permission from the admirals of the International Squadron to shell the insurgents, the Ottoman Navy ironclad Mukaddeme-i Hayir fired three rounds, the first of which was particularly accurate, and her gunfire cleared the hillsides around the blockhouse of insurgents.

==== Kandanos expedition ====
Amid reports of massacres of Muslims by Christian insurgents on Crete, concern grew over the safety of the Ottoman garrison and Muslim inhabitants of Kandanos. Ships of the International Squadron, including the British battleship HMS Rodney (with the British consul at Canea, Alfred Biliotti (1833–1915), aboard) arrived off Selino Kastelli (now Palaiochora) in southwestern Crete on 5 March 1897. On 6 March an international landing force consisting of 200 British Royal Marines and sailors, 100 men each from Austro-Hungarian and French warships, 75 Russians, and 50 Italian sailors under the overall command of Captain John Harvey Rainier of Rodney came ashore and began an expedition to Kandanos, stopping at Spaniakos overnight and arriving at Kandanos on 7 March. The expedition departed Kandanos for the return journey on 8 March, bringing with it 1,570 civilians and 340 Ottoman soldiers from Kandanos and pausing during the day to pick up 112 more Ottoman troops from a fort at Spaniakos. Stopping for the night at Selino Kasteli, the expedition came under fire by Christian insurgents besieging two small Ottoman redoubts outside the village, but a Russian field gun drove them off. The expedition relieved one of the redoubts overnight. On the morning of 9 March, Christian insurgents again opened fire, but the expedition's artillery ashore and gunfire by International Squadron warships in the bay silenced them. The expedition then mounted a bayonet charge that relieved the second Ottoman redoubt, and the expeditionary force and the Ottoman soldiers and Muslim civilians it had rescued evacuated by sea. The expedition suffered no casualties among its European personnel or the Ottoman soldiers it rescued, and only one Muslim civilian was wounded during the four-day operation. The Christian insurgents lost four killed and 16 wounded.

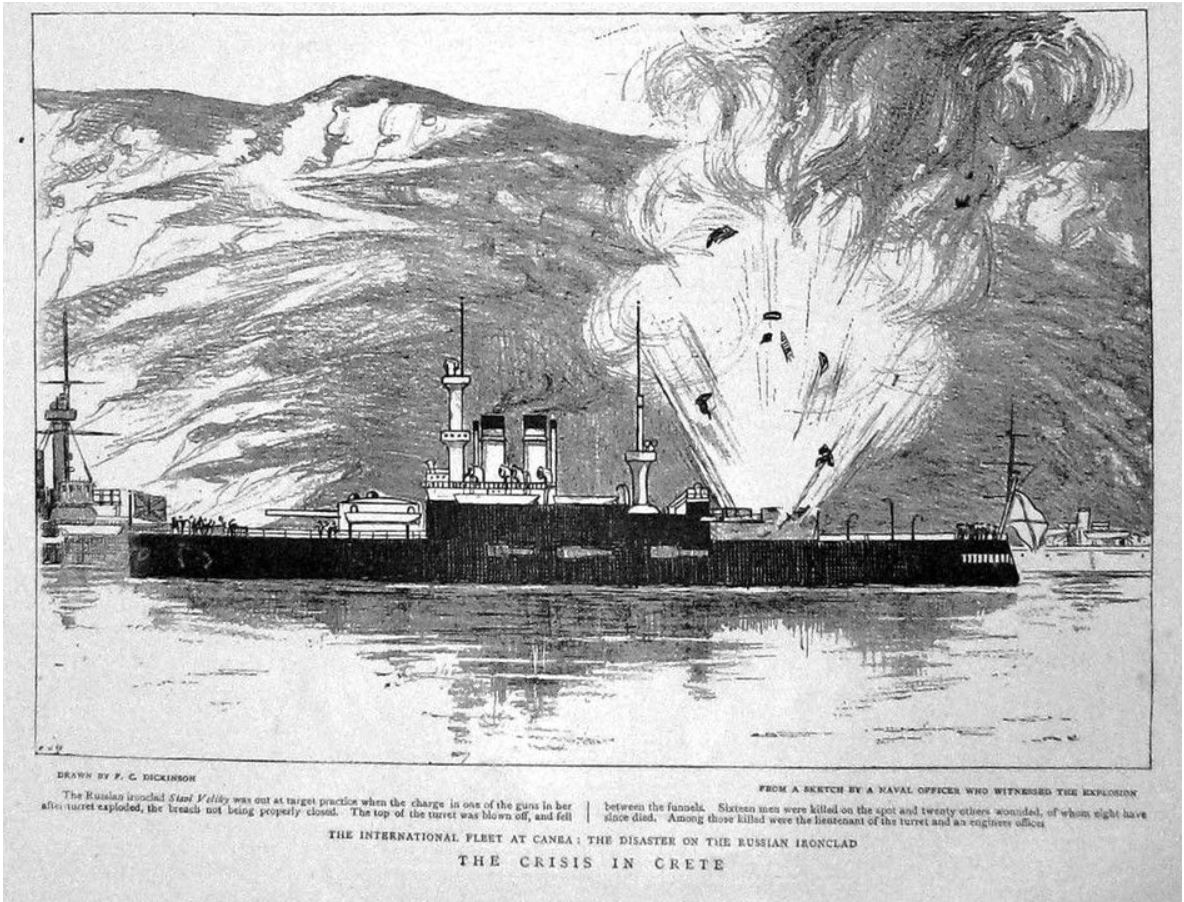
A drawing from the 27 March 1897 edition of The Graphic of the turret explosion aboard the Russian battleship Sissoi Veliky off Crete on 15 March 1897.

==== Sissoi Veliky explosion ====
Tragedy struck the International Squadron on 15 March 1897 when the Russian battleship Sissoi Veliky suffered an explosion in her after 12-inch (305-mm) gun turret one hour into a routine target practice session off Crete that blew the roof of the turret over the mainmast; it struck the base of the foremast and crushed a steam cutter and a 37-millimeter gun. The explosion – which occurred after the turret crew disabled a malfunctioning safety mechanism, allowing one of the guns to fire before its breech was properly closed – killed 16 men instantly and injured 15, six of whom later died of their injuries. Sissoi Veliky steamed to Toulon, France, for repairs.

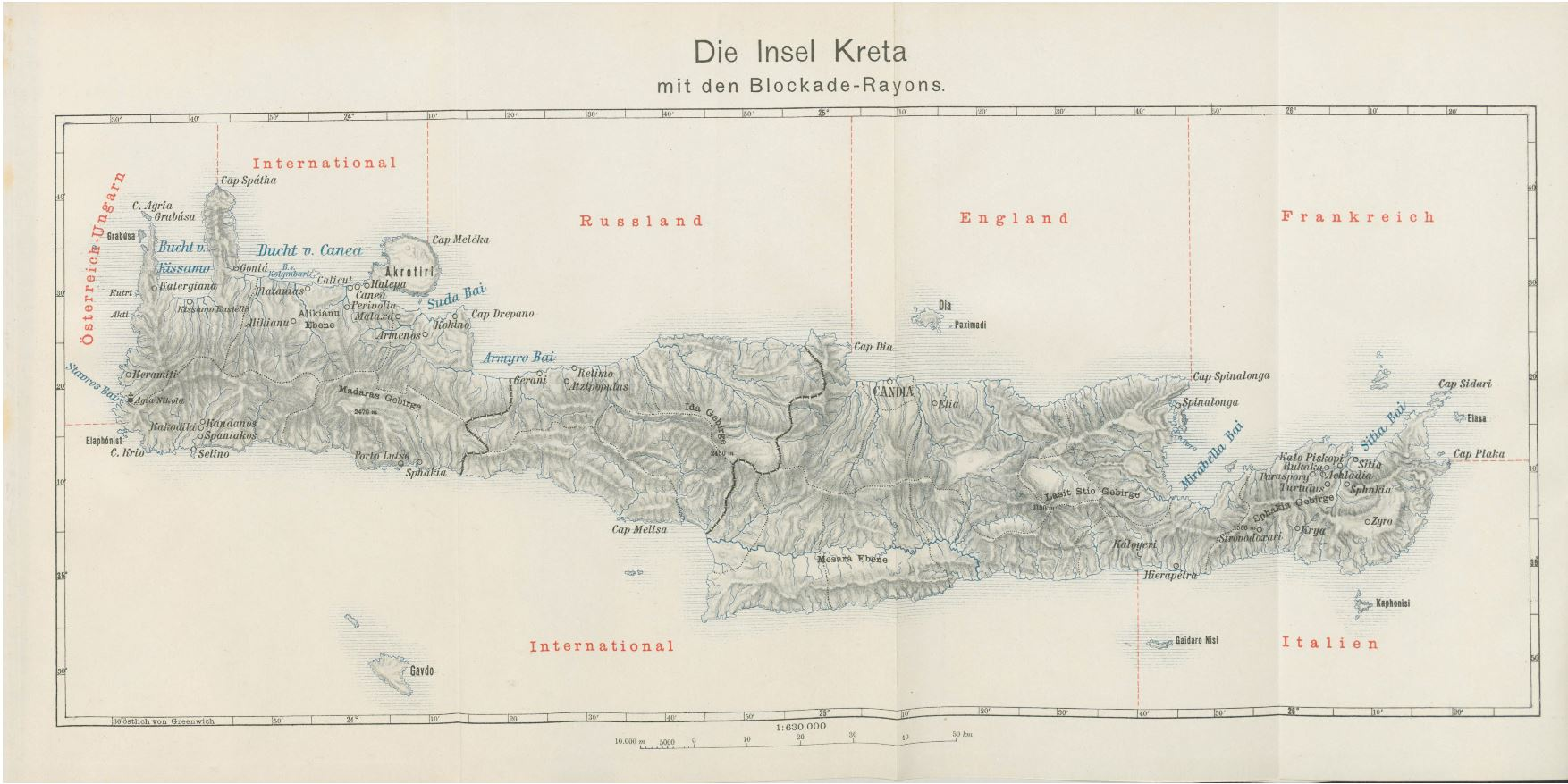
An 1897 Austro-Hungarian map of the International Squadron's blockade zones.

==== Blockade and occupation ====
On 17 March 1897, the Austro-Hungarian torpedo cruiser SMS Sebenico, patrolling to prevent Greek reinforcements and supplies from reaching Crete, intercepted a Greek schooner loaded with a cargo of munitions and manned by Cretan insurgents off Cape Dia, Crete. An exchange of gunfire followed in which Sebenico sank the schooner. The schooner's crew suffered no casualties and swam to shore on Crete.

In the meantime, the Powers had directed the Admirals Council to develop a coercive plan to force Greece to withdraw its forces from Crete. The admirals' plan, announced on 18 March 1897, had two parts. One was the institution of a blockade of Crete and of the main ports in Greece, allowing no Greek ships to call at ports in Crete and permitting ships of other nationalities to unload their cargoes only at Cretan ports occupied by forces of the International Squadron; this blockade went into effect on 21 March 1897. Austria-Hungary took the responsibility for blockading Crete's western and extreme northwestern coast, Russia for much of the western portion of the north central coast, the United Kingdom for the eastern portion of the north central coast, France for the northeastern coast, and Italy for the southeastern coast, while the blockade of a portion of the northwestern coast and most of the southern coast was a shared, international responsibility. The other part of the plan called for the division of Crete into five sectors of occupation, with each of the six powers sending a battalion of troops from its army to the island to relieve the International Squadron's sailors and marines of occupation duties ashore. Germany, which was growing increasingly sympathetic toward the Ottoman Empire and opposed the limits on coercion of Greece the International Squadron recommended, refused to send troops, limiting its contribution to one ship (first Kaiserin Augusta, later relieved by the ironclad coast defense ship SMS Oldenburg) and the marines that the ship put ashore. However, troops of the Austro-Hungarian Army, British Army, French Army, Italian Army, and Imperial Russian Army began landing in Crete to take up occupation duties in late March and early April 1897. By early April, about 2,500 troops of the five armies were ashore. The troops ashore came under the overall command of the Admirals Council, which instructed British Army Major General Herbert Chermside (1850–1929), the overall commander of the occupation forces ashore, that he should not base any of his troops beyond the range of the International Squadron's guns.

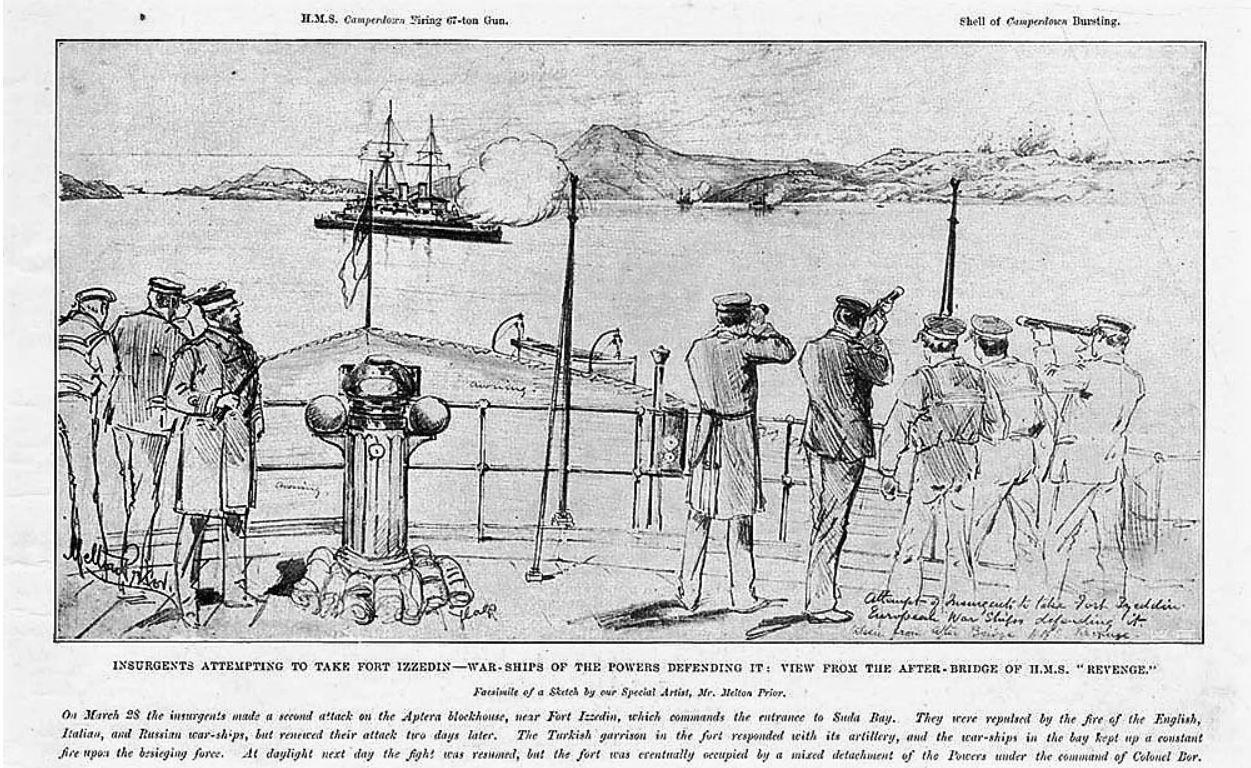
Sketch of HMS Camperdown firing her 13.5-inch (343-mm) guns at insurgents attacking Izzeddin Fortress as seen from HMS Revenge.

==== March bombardments ====
Just as the European soldiers were beginning to arrive on Crete, the insurgents renewed their attack on the Aptera blockhouse and captured it on 25 March 1897 despite shelling by Ottoman warships in Suda Bay. Immediately after the insurgents took the blockhouse, the smaller warships of the International Squadron fired about a hundred shells that landed on and around it, with one heavy shell from the Italian protected cruiser Giovanni Bausan penetrating the blockhouse's walls and exploding inside it, driving the insurgents back out. Some of the shells damaged the villages of Malaxa and Kontopoulo. On 26 and 27 March, the British battleship HMS Camperdown, using her guns in anger for the first time in her history, opened fire at a range of 5,000 yards (4,572 meters) – including four 1,250-pound (567-kg) rounds from her 13.5-inch (343-mm) guns – on insurgents besieging the Izzeddin Fortress itself near the entrance to Suda Bay, forcing the insurgents to abandon their siege. A contingent of Royal Marines from the British battleship Revenge then landed and took control of the fort.

==== Other actions ====
While soldiers of the international force came ashore to take over occupation responsibilities from the sailors and marines of the International Squadron, the squadron continued to address threats by the insurgents ashore while adding support of those troops to its responsibilities on and around the island. During March, French marines landed on Crete and took the responsibility for assisting Ottoman troops in defending Fort Soubashi, 3 miles (5 km) southwest of Canea, against Greek Army and Christian insurgent forces; on 30 March, the French marines took part in an international expedition to protect a source of fresh water at the fort. In late March, the British battleship HMS Rodney shelled insurgents attempting to mine the walls of the Ottoman fort at Kastelli-Kissamos, driving them off, and the International Squadron landed 200 Royal Marines and 130 Austro-Hungarian sailors and marines to reprovision the fort and demolish nearby buildings that had provided cover for the mining effort. Elsewhere, the Italian battleship Ruggiero di Lauria broke up a threat by Cretan insurgents at Heraptera (now Ierapetra) by threatening to bombard them.

After the actions of late March 1897, the International Squadron and the various European military contingents ashore feared a major insurgent attack against the towns held by European forces, but none came; in fact, after the International Squadron's bombardments in late March, organized insurgent operations against Ottoman and European forces ended, with hostilities thereafter limited to occasional sniping. The International Squadron's admirals held a review of the troops of the international occupation force in Canea on 15 April 1897, presumably to impress the local inhabitants with the military power the Great Powers could bring to bear to enforce peace on the island. However, as late as 21 April 1897, the British battleship HMS Camperdown anchored off Canea – where Ottoman troops, Muslim civilians, and a force of British and Italian soldiers were besieged by an estimated 60,000 insurgents – to deter insurgents who had begun a demonstration with two artillery pieces that threatened the town.

=== Greco-Turkish War of 1897 ===
Meanwhile, the Greco-Turkish War of 1897, also known as the Thirty Days War, had broken out on the mainland of Europe, with Greek forces crossing the border into Ottoman Macedonia on 24 March 1897, followed by an official declaration of war on 20 April. As the Great Powers had expected, the war ended quickly in a disastrous Greek defeat, and a ceasefire went into effect on 20 May 1897. Stymied by the International Squadron's actions and unable to advance beyond Fort Soubashi to threaten Canea or to receive reinforcements or supplies in the face of the blockade, Vassos, who had achieved little since February, accomplished nothing further during the war and left Crete on 9 May 1897. With the ceasefire agreement that ended hostilities on the European mainland requiring all Greek forces to leave Crete, his expeditionary force boarded the British protected cruiser HMS Hawke at Platanias on 23 May 1897 and withdrew from the island. On 20 September 1897, Greece and the Ottoman Empire signed the Treaty of Constantinople, formally ending their war.

=== Seeking peace ===
Ships of the International Squadron off Crete fire a salute in honor of Queen Victoria′s Diamond Jubilee on 22 June 1897.

Despite the events on the European mainland, the Christian insurrection on Crete continued. However, the military threat to the European Powers dropped so much after March 1897 that the International Squadron and the occupying forces ashore could turn their attention to ceremonial activities in the spring, such as a parade in honor of the Italian participation in the intervention on 4 May 1897 and a celebration of Queen Victoria′s Diamond Jubilee on 22 June 1897.

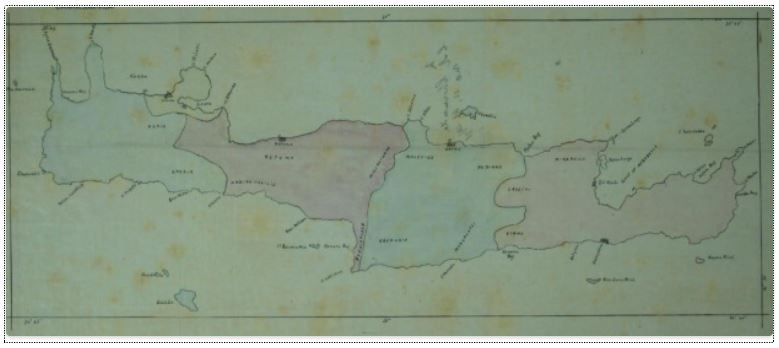
Major General Herbert Chermside′s April 1898 map of Crete showing zones of occupation and blockade responsibilities for the four remaining countries after the withdrawal of Austria-Hungary and the German Empire. Zones are, left to right, those of Italy, the Russian Empire, the United Kingdom, and France. Canea and Suda Bay remained under the international control of all four countries.

With the military situation on the island quiet, the Admirals Council attempted to establish a working agreement between the insurgents and Ottoman forces on the island that would bring the revolt to an end without Ottoman forces having to leave Crete. This proved impossible. The Admirals Council then decided to resolve the situation by establishing a new, autonomous Cretan State that would run its own internal affairs but remain under the suzerainty of the Ottoman Empire. Germany, increasingly sympathetic with the Ottoman Empire, disagreed strongly with this decision and withdrew from Crete and the International Squadron in November 1897. Austria-Hungary also left in March 1898. Although the departures of German and Austro-Hungarian ships and troops weakened the International Squadron and the occupying forces, the four remaining Great Powers continued the blockade and occupation, dividing Crete into zones of responsibility among themselves. Italy took the responsibility for the western portion of the island, Russia the west-central portion, the United Kingdom the east-central part, and France the island's eastern area, while Canea and Suda Bay remained under joint, multinational control.

Having decided to establish the Cretan State, the Admirals Council turned its attention in the spring of 1898 to finding someone to serve as High Commissioner of the new state. They offered the position to Vice Admiral Canevaro, but he turned down the offer and left the International Squadron to take office on 1 June 1898 as Italy's Minister of the Navy. French Rear Admiral Édouard Pottier succeeded him in command of the squadron and as president of the Admirals Council, and the search for a high commissioner continued.

Meanwhile, by the spring of 1898, the Powers began to relax the blockade, reduce their presence in the International Squadron, and draw down their occupying forces ashore on Crete; for example, the British presence fell to one British Army battalion ashore and typically one battleship (usually anchored at Suda Bay), one cruiser, and one gunboat on station. With the situation on Crete quiet, the British commander of forces on and around Crete, Rear-Admiral Gerard Noel (1845–1918) – who relieved Rear-Admiral Robert Harris (1843–1926) of this duty on 12 January 1898 – withdrew his flag from Crete and delegated his seat on the Admirals Council to whichever officer happened to be the British Senior Naval Officer at Crete at the time of each of the council's meetings, leading to frequent changes in British representation. For its part, the council began to loosen its formerly tight control over affairs on Crete, allowing greater autonomy in the decision-making of lower-ranking officers of the occupation force as they dealt with affairs on Crete. On 25 July 1898, the Admirals Council took the major step of turning over civil administration of Crete, except for the towns under international occupation, to the Christian Assembly, which was intended to become the legislative body of the Cretan State.

=== Candia riot ===
Cretan insurgents paid no taxes during the revolt and, with only the Muslim inhabitants of Cretan towns subject to taxation, financing of the administration of the island became increasingly difficult. Finally, the Admirals Council decided to place the customs houses on Crete under British control so that the British could exact an export duty that would fund the general welfare of the island. They ordered the Ottomans to surrender the custom houses and made plans to replace Muslim officials and employees at the houses with Cretan Christians. Takeover of customs houses in Canea and Rethymno on 3 September 1898 took place without incident.

When the British attempted to take control of the custom house at Candia (now Heraklion) on 6 September, however, violent resistance broke out among Muslim inhabitants, who believed that they were being forced to pay for a Christian takeover of their privileges. With only a 130-man detachment of the British Army's Highland Light Infantry ashore and the Royal Navy torpedo gunboat HMS Hazard the only warship present in the harbor, Muslim mobs confronted British officials, soldiers, and sailors at the harbor and the customs house, began a slaughter of Christian inhabitants, and opened a heavy fire on British military personnel at the harbor and not long afterward at the British encampment and hospital at the western end of the town. Hazard landed reinforcements and began to bombard the town in support of the beleaguered British forces ashore. Pressure on the British forces at the harbor gate became so severe that they withdrew to the water distillation ship SS Turquoise in the harbor. The Muslims around the customs house and harbor did not cease fire until Ottoman troops led by the local Ottoman governor, Edhem Pasha (1851–1909), finally appeared late in the afternoon to restore order. When British forces at the camp and hospital fell back on the Ottoman fort west of town, Ottoman troops finally intervened there as well to quell the disturbance, which ended in the early evening. Ottoman forces otherwise made no effort to assist the British, protect Christian civilians, or keep order during the riot. Estimates of deaths during the day vary; the British suffered between 14 and 17 military personnel and at least three civilians killed and between 27 and 39 servicemen wounded, and Muslims slaughtered somewhere between 153 and nearly a thousand Christians, according to different sources.

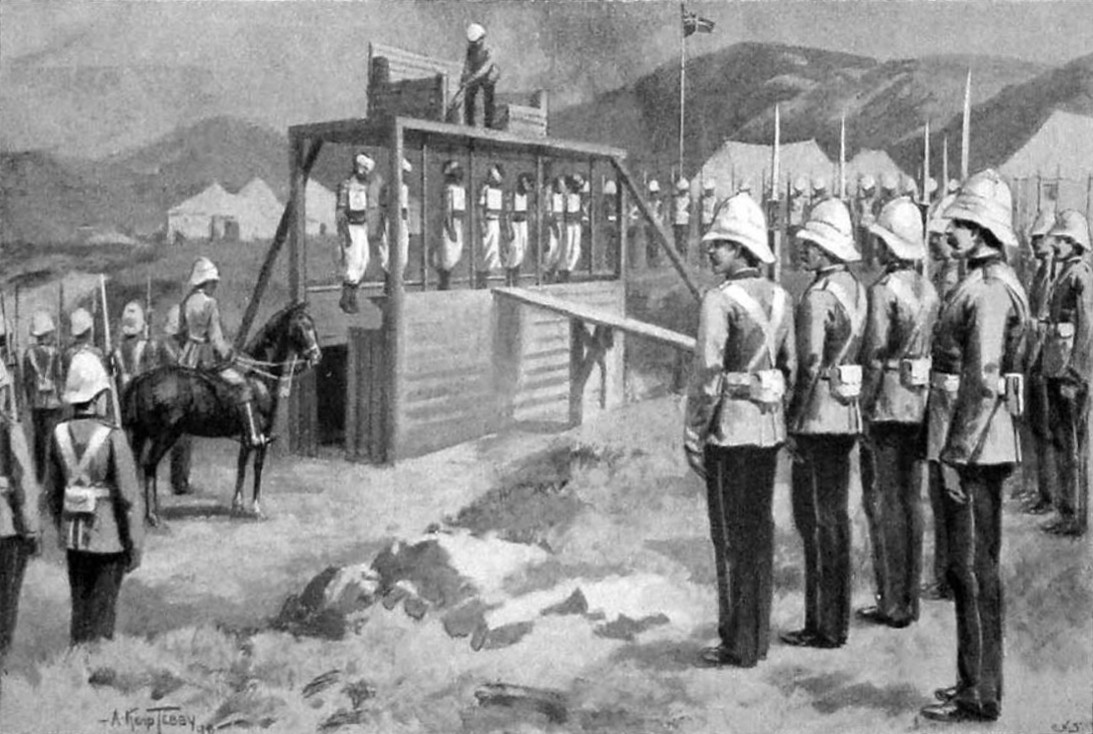
Illustration of the hanging on 18 October 1898 of the first seven men convicted of murdering British subjects in the Candia riot. (Illustration from The Graphic, 5 November 1898.)

After a tense night, reinforcements arrived in the form of the British battleship HMS Camperdown on 7 September, and she put a landing party of Royal Marines ashore. French, Italian, and Russian warships also arrived, and Austria-Hungary – although no longer a part of the International Squadron – sent the torpedo cruiser SMS Leopard to the scene. The International Squadron put 300 French marines and Italian mountain troops from Canea ashore at Candia. British Army forces also began to flood into the town, and by 23 September 2,868 British troops were on hand.

The International Squadron's senior British commander, Rear-Admiral Gerard Noel, arrived at Candia aboard his flagship HMS Revenge – joined soon afterward by two more British warships, the battleship HMS Illustrious and the protected cruiser HMS Venus – on 12 September 1898. He disembarked immediately to inspect the scene of the riot personally, and ordered the Ottoman governor, Edhem Pasha, to meet him aboard Revenge on the morning of 13 September. At the meeting, Noel ordered Edhem Pasha to demolish all buildings from which rioters had fired on the British camp and hospital, disarm the entire Muslim population of the city, pay all customs duties due since 3 May 1898 and continue to pay them daily, and hand over the persons chiefly responsible for instigating the riot so that they could face trial; when Edhem Pasha refused, Camperdown and Revenge conducted a demonstration that overcame his reluctance. Ottoman officials met all of Noel's demands.

The British took custody of the first men accused of murder on 14 September and moved swiftly, trying those accused of killing British military personnel in courts martial and those accused of killing British civilians before a British military tribunal. Twelve men were convicted of murdering British soldiers and five of murdering British civilians, and all 17 of the men were sentenced to death by hanging. Held aboard the British protected cruiser HMS Isis while awaiting their trials and executions, the men were hanged publicly in prominent locations. The first seven men convicted of murdering British military personnel were hanged on 18 October, and the final five on 29 October, and the five men convicted of murdering British civilians were hanged on 5 November. Two men convicted under Italian jurisdiction of murdering Cretan civilians were executed by a firing squad composed of three men from each of the four powers. on 23 November, after which use of the death penalty for killers of Christian civilians was dropped.

=== Evacuation of Ottoman forces ===
Ottoman Army troops depart Crete at Suda Bay in November 1898.

The Candia riot changed the International Squadron's attitude toward the situation on Crete: Previously it had viewed Christian insurgents as hostile and saw its primary role as supporting and protecting Ottoman forces, but the unhelpful behavior of Ottoman forces during the riot changed this, and thereafter the squadron saw the Ottomans as the hostile force. In the aftermath of the riot, the Admirals Council decided that all Christian and Muslim inhabitants had to be disarmed and all Ottoman forces had to leave Crete. The Ottomans stalled. The Great Powers' patience finally wore out on 4 October 1898, when they demanded that all Ottoman forces leave Crete by 19 October. Agreeing in principle to the evacuation of their forces, but objecting to the withdrawal timeline demanded by the Admirals Council and desirous of a small force of Ottoman troops remaining on Crete to guard the Ottoman flag, the Ottomans continued to stall, but finally began to withdraw their forces from the island on 23 October. However, they halted the withdrawal on 28 October with about 8,000 Ottoman troops still on the island so as to avoid embarrassment of the Ottoman Empire during a visit of Germany's Kaiser Wilhelm II (1859–1941) to Constantinople. At the insistence of the British, in punishment for the delay in evacuation, the Admirals Council demanded that the Ottoman flag be hauled down in Canea – which it was, on 3 November – and that all Ottoman troops leave the island by 5 November; in the event of them failing to do so the Powers threatened to take steps to sink all Ottoman ships in Suda Bay and bombard and destroy the Izzeddrin Fortress, then expand bombardments to include Canea, Hieraptra, Spinalonga, Kissamos, and Rethymo, requiring the Ottoman government to pay indemnities for any damages resulting from these actions. The International Squadron and the occupying forces ashore developed plans for carrying out these threats; at Candia, for example, plans called for British forces ashore to withdraw to the coast with the support of Cretan Christian insurgent forces and embark aboard the ships of the International Squadron, after which the threatened bombardment would begin.

The Ottomans responded by resuming the evacuation of their troops, but after the 5 November deadline passed, about 500 Ottoman troops remained in Candia. The British took administrative control of Candia on 5 November, so British troops evicted the remaining Ottoman troops from their barracks on 6 November 1898 and ensured that – supervised by officers and men of the British battleships HMS Revenge and HMS Empress of India – the last Ottoman forces in Crete embarked on the British torpedo gunboat HMS Hussar for transportation to Salonica. Their embarkation on Hussar brought 229 years of Ottoman occupation of Crete to an end. However, a few Ottoman troops remained behind into December 1898 to supervise the withdrawal of Ottoman munitions and ordnance, and as late as December arguments broke out between the Ottomans and the occupying powers over such matters as how many Ottoman troops could remain behind and what military ranks they could hold.

On 6 November 1898, with the last troops of the Ottoman garrison gone, the Admirals Council directed that the Ottoman flag be raised again. It took this step to indicate to Muslim Cretans that their rights would still be respected even without direct Ottoman rule of Crete.

Illustration of units of the International Squadron arriving at Suda Bay, Crete, on 21 December 1898. The French protected cruiser Bugeaud, carrying Prince George of Greece and Denmark, who will take up duty as High Commissioner of the Cretan State, leads the column. She is followed (right to left) by the Russian armored cruiser Gerzog Edinburgski, the British battleship HMS Revenge, and the Italian battleship Francesco Morosini.

=== Transportation of Prince George ===
On 26 November 1898, the Admirals Council formally offered the position of High Commissioner of the Cretan State to Prince George of Greece and Denmark. Prince George accepted. With the last Ottoman forces gone from Crete, the International Squadron's final task was to arrange for Prince George's arrival on the island to take up his duties, marking the establishment of the new state. Complications arose over his transportation to Crete. He originally proposed that he would arrive aboard the Greek royal yacht, but the Admirals Council rejected this idea. Greece proposed that a Greek Navy warship transport him to the island, but this idea did not meet with the approval of the International Squadron's admirals either. Greece then proposed that a Greek merchant ship flying the Greek flag carry him to the island, but the four powers unanimously rejected this idea as well. Finally, the Admirals Council informed Prince George that the International Squadron would bring him to Crete, with a European warship flying her own national flag carrying him, escorted by warships of the other three powers flying their own national flags.

Prince George's arrival suffered a last-minute delay when an argument broke out among the four powers over the design of the flag of the new Cretan State. After the new flag's design met with the approval of all four powers, the four flagships of the countries making up the International Squadron – the French protected cruiser Bugeaud with the International Squadron's senior commander, Vice Admiral Édouard Pottier, aboard; the Italian battleship Francesco Morosini, carrying the admiral commanding the squadron's Italian ships; the Russian armored cruiser Gerzog Edinburgski with the senior Russian commander, Rear Admiral Nikolai Skrydlov, aboard; and the British battleship HMS Revenge with the British commander, Rear Admiral Gerard Noel, aboard – finally steamed on 19 December 1898 to Milos, where Prince George awaited them on his yacht. He boarded Bugeaud on 20 December. Escorted by the other three flagships, Bugeaud took him to Suda, where he disembarked on 21 December 1898 to take up duties as High Commissioner of the new Cretan State. His arrival on the island brought 229 years of direct Ottoman rule of Crete – as well as de facto control of the island by the Admirals Council – to an end.

On 26 December 1898, the Admirals Council formally was dissolved. Its duties completed, the International Squadron dispersed.

== Legacy ==
The Cretan State, created by the decisions of the International Squadron's admirals as they negotiated the status of Crete on behalf of their governments, existed until 1913. Foreign troops continued to garrison the island until 1909, and Royal Navy ships remained on station there until 1913. In 1913, after the Greek victory in the Second Balkan War, Greece formally annexed Crete in the Treaty of Athens.

== See also ==
- Cretan State
- Cretan Turks
- History of Crete
- Ottoman Crete

== Bibliography ==
- Clowes, Sir William Laird. The Royal Navy: A History From the Earliest Times to the Death of Queen Victoria, Volume Seven. London: Chatham Publishing, 1997. ISBN 1-86176-016-7.
- McTiernan, Mick, A Very Bad Place Indeed For a Soldier. The British involvement in the early stages of the European Intervention in Crete. 1897 - 1898, King's College, London, September 2014.
