= John Harvey Rainier =

Royal Navy Admiral (1847–1915)

Admiral John Harvey Rainier
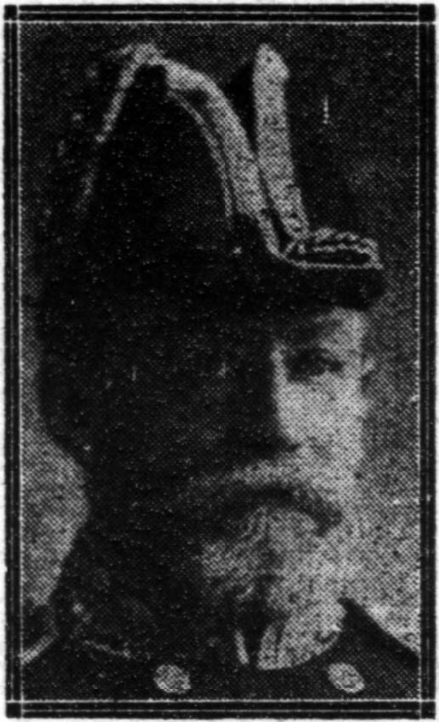
- Born: 29 April 1847
- Died: 21 November 1915 (aged 68) Southborough, Kent, United Kingdom
- Allegiance: United Kingdom
- Branch: Royal Navy
- Service years: 1860–1905
- Rank: Admiral
- Commands: HMS Kingfisher; HMS Tourmaline; HMS Iris; HMS Rodney; HMS Thunderer; HMS Nile; Devonport Fleet Reserve
- Conflicts: Cretan Revolt (1897–1898)

Admiral John Harvey Rainier (29 April 1847 – 21 November 1915) was a Royal Navy officer. He had the unusual distinction of commanding troops from six different nations in action.

== Background ==
Descended from the Huguenot family of Régnier, John Harvey Rainier was the son of the Rev. George Rainier, vicar of Ninfield, and of Sarah Rainier, née Harvey. His elder brother, George Harvey Rainier, was also a naval officer. Another brother, the Rev. W. V. Rainier, was a naval chaplain.

Rainier was descended from two families with long naval connections. On his father's side, he was related to Admiral Peter Rainier, Rear-Admiral John Spratt Rainier, and Captain Peter Rainier. Through his mother, Rainier belonged to a family whose naval associations can be traced back to the 16th century. He was the grandson of Vice-Admiral Sir Thomas Harvey, and the great-grandson of Admiral Sir Henry Harvey and of Captain John Harvey, who fell at the Glorious First of June. At least two of his uncles were also admirals.

== Early life and career ==
Rainier was educated at private schools before entering HMS Britannia in December 1860 as a cadet, scoring first of thirty-four successful candidates. From 1862 to 1866, he served on the Pacific Station in HMS Tribune, Topaze, Sutlej, Leander, and Alert. Becoming a sub-lieutenant in 1866 and a lieutenant in 1869, he served from 1867 to 1870 on the West African Station in HMS Vestal, Rattlesnake, and Plover, then on the Plover in the West Indies from 1870 to 1871. From 1872 to 1874, he served in HMS Northumberland in the Channel Squadron.

Having specialised in gunnery in 1876, from 1876 to 1880 he was on the staff and senior lieutenant of HMS Excellent, being promoted to commander in 1880. He served on the War Office Committee on Machine Guns in 1880–1881, and was secretary to the Committee on Torpedo Instruction in 1884.

Appointed to the command of the composite screw sloop HMS Kingfisher for service on the East Indies Station in 1884, Rainier landed at Zeyla in February 1885 with seamen and Royal Marines to assist in the arrest of mutinous Somali police. The same year, whilst in command of the Kingfisher, he was a member of the Defence Committee of Mauritius, and received the thanks of the Governor. Kingfisher was engaged in anti-slavery patrols off the east coast of Africa, during which he captured several slave dhows.

Promoted to captain in 1887, Rainier was next appointed to the command of the corvette HMS Tourmaline in 1889 on the North America and West Indies Station. He received the appreciation of both the Admiralty and of the Governor of the Leeward Islands for his prompt action during disturbances at Tortola in 1890, the thanks of the French governor of Martinique for taking relief to the island after the fire at Fort de France the same year, and the thanks of the governors of the Leeward and Windward Islands and of Trinidad for various services in 1890–1892. He also received the approval of the Foreign Office for the actions he took at Tucacas during a revolution in Venezuela in 1892.

== Cretan service ==
After a short stint in command of the second class protected cruiser HMS Iris in 1893, Rainier took command of the battleship HMS Rodney in 1894. In February 1897, Rodney joined the International Squadron off the coast of Crete during the island's revolt against Ottoman rule.

In March, following reports of massacres of Muslims by Christian insurgents, Rainier led an international landing force consisting of 200 British Royal Marines and sailors, 100 men each from Austro-Hungarian and French warships, 75 Russians, and 50 Italian sailors on an expedition inland to Kandanos (also spelt Candanos), which rescued 1,570 Muslim civilians and 340 Ottoman soldiers from Kandanos and 112 Ottoman troops from a fort at Spaniakos (or 3,000 in total according to some contemporaneous sources) and evacuated them by sea. Of the rescued, only one civilian was wounded, while the Christian insurgents lost four killed and 16 wounded.

For his part in the expedition, Rainier was mentioned in despatches and personally thanked by the senior foreign admiral.

== Later career ==
In 1897, Rainier took command of the turret ship HMS Thunderer, and in 1898 he was appointed to command of the battleship HMS Nile, simultaneously appointed for command of the Fleet Reserve at Devonport. The same year, he was granted a captain's good service pension. In May 1898, he was superseded in command of the Nile, but continued in command of the Devonport Fleet Reserve until March 1901, when he was promoted to rear-admiral.

Promoted to vice-admiral on 26 June 1905, he was placed on the retired list at his own request on 1 August that year. Promoted to admiral on the retired list on 5 November 1908, he died in 1915 at St. Margaret's, Southborough, Kent.

== Family ==
Rainier married in 1880 Georgina Mary (Ina) O’Callaghan, daughter of I. Stoney O’Callaghan, barrister-at-law, of Dublin; they had two sons and a daughter. Both of his sons joined the Royal Navy: John Walter Rainier (born 1881) reached the rank of captain and Daniel Harvey Rainier (born 1888) reached the rank of lieutenant-commander.
