= HMS Rodney (1884) =

Admiral class battleship

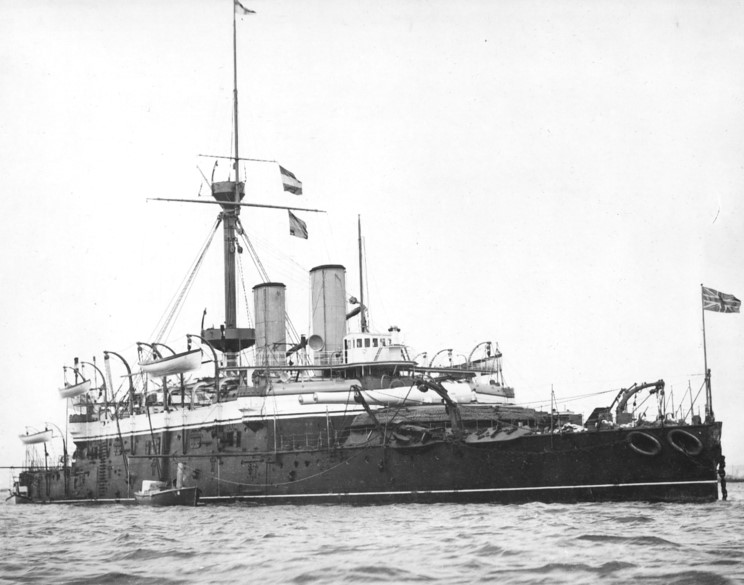
- British battleship HMS Rodney

History

United Kingdom
- Name: HMS Rodney
- Namesake: Admiral George Brydges Rodney
- Builder: Chatham Dockyard
- Laid down: 6 February 1882
- Launched: 8 October 1884
- Completed: June 1888
- Fate: Broken up, 1909

General characteristics
- Class & type: Admiral-class ironclad
- Displacement: 10,300 tons
- Length: 325 ft (99 m) pp
- Beam: 68 ft (21 m)
- Draught: 27 ft 10 in (8.48 m)
- Propulsion: Two-shaft Humphreys compound inverted; 7,500 ihp (5,600 kW) normal; 11,500 ihp (8,600 kW) forced draught
- Speed: 15.7 knots (29.1 km/h) normal, 17.4 knots (32.2 km/h) forced draught
- Complement: 530
- Armament: 4 × BL 13.5-inch (342.9 mm) guns; 6 × BL 6-inch (152.4 mm) guns; 12 × 6-pounders; 4 × above-water torpedo tubes
- Armour: Belt: 18–8 in (457–203 mm); Bulkheads: 16–7 in (406–178 mm); Barbettes: 11.5–10 in (292–254 mm); Conning Tower: 12–2 in (305–51 mm); Deck: 3–2 in (76–51 mm)

HMS Rodney was a battleship of the Victorian Royal Navy, a member of the Admiral class of warships designed by Nathaniel Barnaby. The ship was the last British battleship to carry a figurehead although smaller ships continued to carry them.

== Design ==
She was a development of the design of Collingwood, but carried 13.5-inch (342.9 mm) calibre main armament as against 12-inch (304.8 mm) in the earlier ship. This necessitated an increase of some 800 tons in displacement, and an increase of some 18 inches (46 cm) in draught. This in turn produced a significant increase in the immersion of the armour belt, which was further increased when the coal bunkers were full. While this meant that under full-load condition the top of the belt approached the water-line, the view was taken that combat with a heavily armed enemy was very unlikely in the immediate vicinity of a British port, and steaming to a more distant potential battleground would use enough fuel to reduce the draught and bring the top of the belt well above water.

=== Guns ===
The main artillery fired a shell weighing 1,250 pounds (570 kg), which would penetrate 27 inches (690 mm) of iron plate at 1,000 yards (910 m). They were carried some 20 feet (6.1 m) above the water line, and each had a firing arc of 270 degrees. The manufacture of these guns took a much greater time than had been expected; this delay was the reason for the unusual prolongation of the time between the laying down of the ship and her completion.

During a refit in 1901, her 6-pounder quick-firing Hotchkiss guns were replaced with 6-pounder quick-firing mark I Nordenfelt guns.

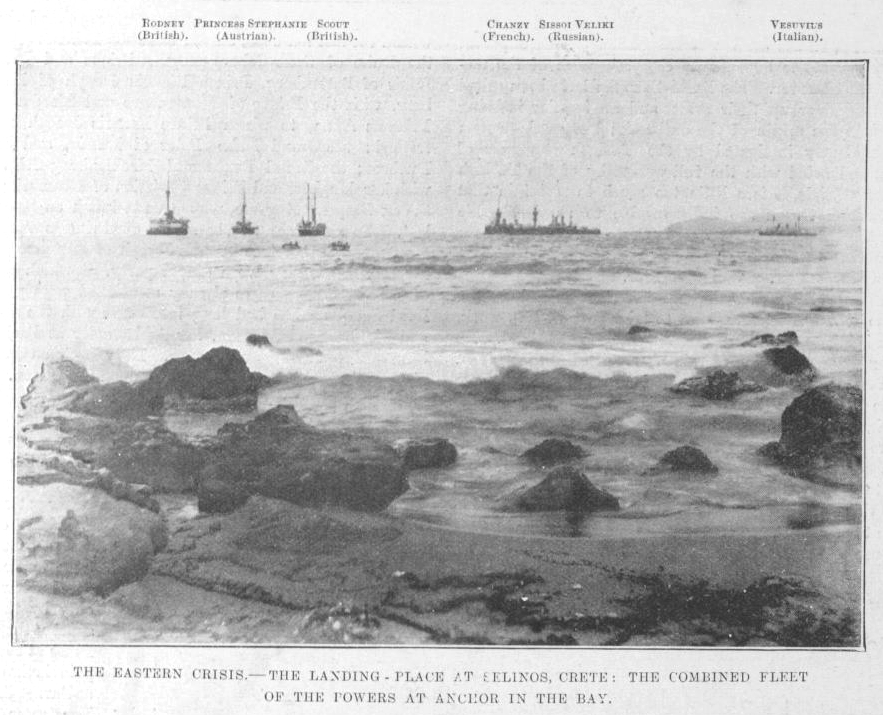
Ships of the International Squadron anchored off Selino Kastelli, Crete, while supporting the expedition to Kandanos. Left to right: Rodney, the Austro-Hungarian ironclad SMS Kronprinzessin Erzherzogin Stephanie, the British torpedo cruiser HMS Scout, the French armoured cruiser Chanzy, the Russian battleship Sissoi Veliky, and the Italian protected cruiser Vesuvio. Illustrated London News 1897

== Service history ==
Rodney was commissioned on 20 June 1888 into the Home Fleet. She was held in reserve until July 1889, and after taking part in manoevres until September 1889, she served with the Channel Fleet until May 1894. She was then posted to the Mediterranean Fleet, remaining there until 1897.

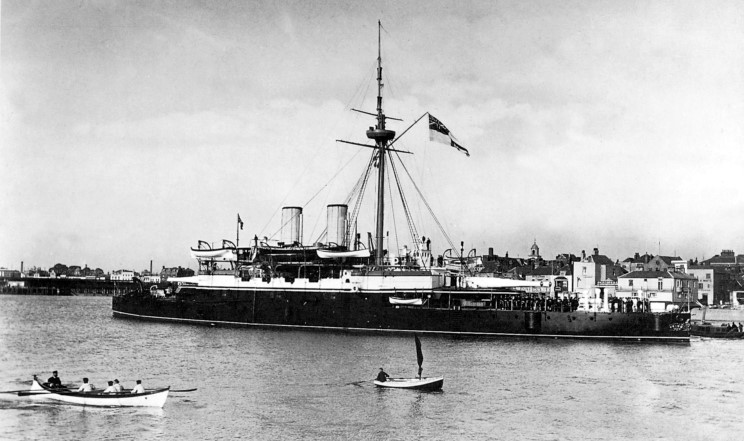
Rodney between 1888 and 1901

During her Mediterranean service, Rodney operated as part of the International Squadron, a multinational force made up of ships of the Austro-Hungarian Navy, French Navy, Imperial German Navy, Italian Royal Navy (Regia Marina), Imperial Russian Navy, and Royal Navy that intervened in the 1897–1898 Greek Christian uprising against the Ottoman Empire's rule in Crete. On 9 February 1897, she became one of the first ships to arrive off Crete, accompanying the battleship HMS Revenge, flagship of Rear-Admiral Robert Harris, to reinforce the British ship on station at Crete, the battleship HMS Barfleur. In early March 1897, with the British consul at Canea, Alfred Biliotti, aboard, she took part in an International Squadron operation to rescue Ottoman soldiers and Cretan Turk civilians at Kandanos, Crete. She joined other ships in putting ashore an international landing party at Selino Kastelli on Crete's southwest coast for the four-day expedition, which was placed under the command of Rodney's Captain John Harvey Rainier. In late March 1897, she shelled Cretan insurgents attempting to mine the walls of the Ottoman fort at Kastelli-Kissamos, driving them off, and the International Squadron landed 200 Royal Marines and 130 Austro-Hungarian sailors and marines to reprovision the fort and demolish nearby buildings that had provided cover for the mining effort.

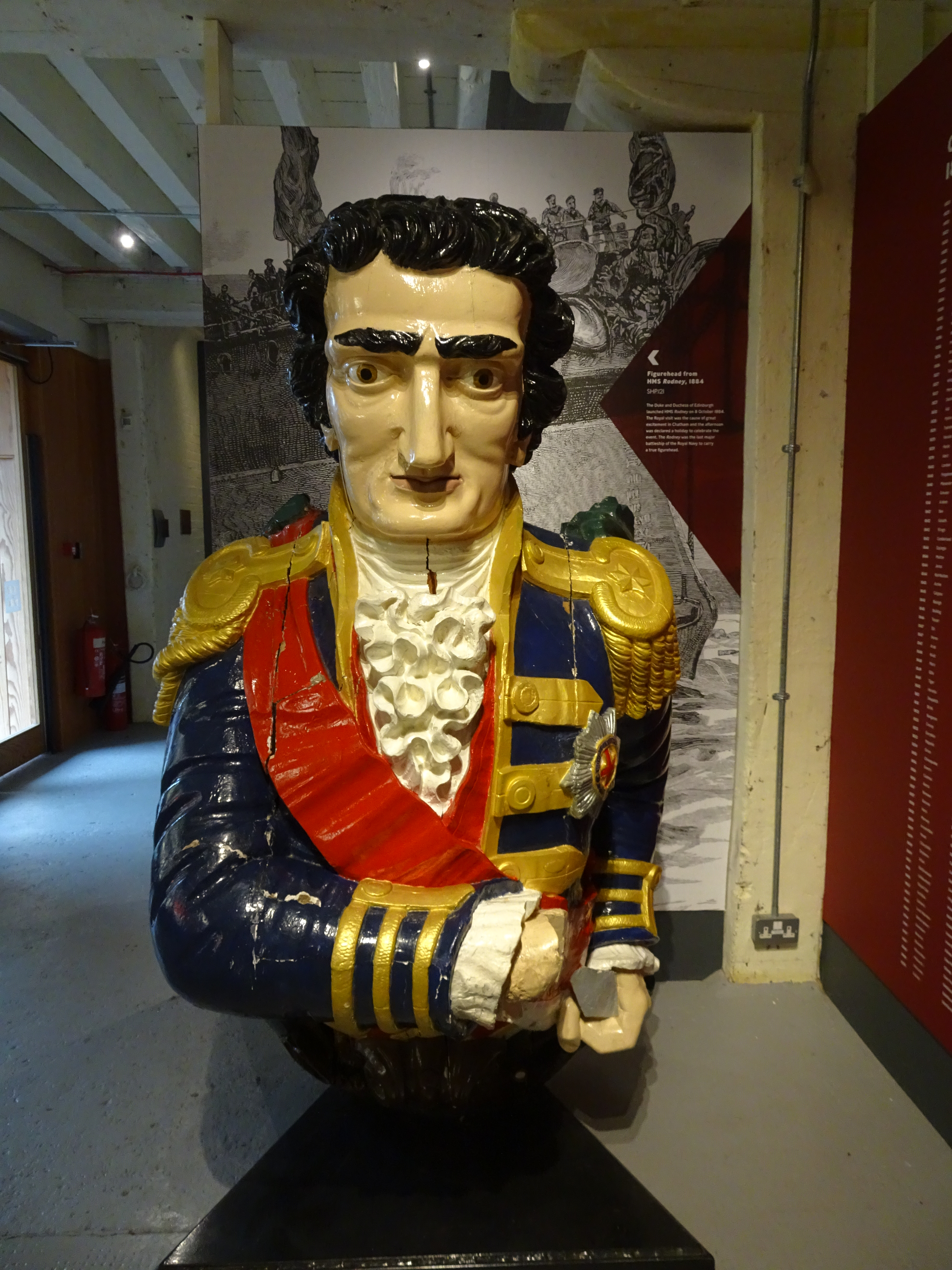
Figurehead of the Rodney at the Chatham Historic Dockyard

Rodney departed the Mediterranean later in 1897. Thereafter she was the coastguard ship based on the Firth of Forth under the command of Captain Gerald Walter Russell until February 1901, when she sailed to Chatham for a refit. She remained in reserve until being sold in 1909.
