= Candia massacre =

1898 massacre of civilians in Crete

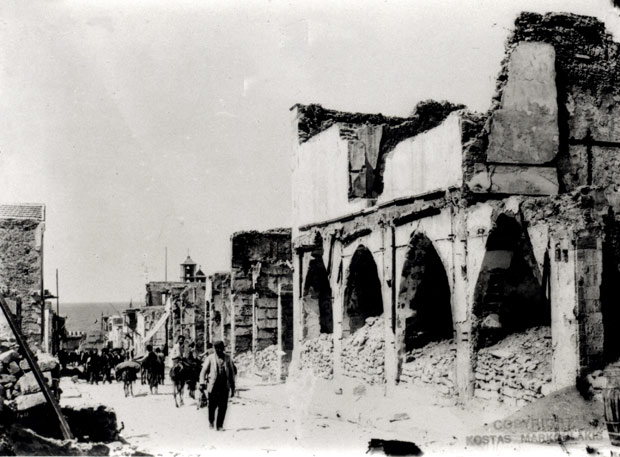
- Main street of Candia after the massacre
- Date: 6 September 1898
- Venue: Candia
- Location: Crete; 35°20′N 25°08′E
- Type: Massacre
- Cause: Granting by foreign powers the Christian Greek community of a series of civil rights
- Target: British soldiers, Greek civilians
- Participants: Armed Muslim irregular groups
- Outcome: Accelerated the end of Ottoman rule on Crete
- Deaths: 500–800
- Property damage: A significant part of Candia
- Sentence: Leaders of the Muslim perpetrators hanged
- Awards: One British sailor was awarded the Victoria Cross

The Candia massacre occurred on 6 September 1898, on Crete, then part of the Ottoman Empire. It occurred as a reaction by armed Muslim irregular groups (Bashi-bazouks) to the offer to the Christian community of a series of civil rights by foreign powers. They attacked the British security force in Candia (modern Heraklion), which was part of an international security force on the island.

Muslim irregulars then proceeded to massacre the local Christians in the city. As a result, 14 British military personnel were murdered, the British vice-consul and his family were burnt alive in their home, and 500–800 Christian inhabitants are estimated to have been massacred. A significant part of Candia was burnt and the massacre ended only after British warships began bombarding the city. The incident accelerated the end of Ottoman rule on Crete and two months later the last Ottoman soldier left the island.

== Background ==
As a result of failed Ottoman policies and oppressive measures against the local Christians, a number of uprisings broke out on Crete demanding union with Greece. Through British mediation the Ottoman sultan finally made a number of reformist concessions which were incorporated in an agreement known as the Pact of Halepa, signed on 25 October 1878. However, in 1889 the Ottoman authorities violated this pact, provoking another insurrection which was put down while the European powers showed no interest in intervention.

In 1895 the Ottoman authorities again violated the Pact of Halepa which culminated with the removal of the Christian governor-general of the island. As a result another uprising broke out in 1896–1897. This time the European powers did intervene, forcing the sultan to restore the terms of the agreement, as well as making additional reforms.

== Massacre ==
As part of the reforms, an international force was installed in Crete by the European powers. The Admirals' Council of this force decided to place the customs houses on Crete under international control so that it could exact an export duty, which would fund the general welfare of the island. Thus, the British contingent of an international security force ordered the Ottomans to surrender the custom house in Candia, (now Heraklion), on September 6 [O.S. August 25] 1898. When the British attempted to take control of the custom house they encountered resistance from local Muslims. With only a 130-man detachment of the British Army’s Highland Light Infantry ashore and the Royal Navy torpedo gunboat HMS Hazard present in the harbour of the city, local Muslims attacked the British at the harbour and the customs house. A British platoon successfully closed the harbour gates. The Muslim demonstrators then turned their firearms on local Christians. 14 British soldiers, sailors and marines were killed and an additional 40 were wounded.

Those groups then attacked the house of the local British vice-consul, Lysimachus Andrew Calocherino (Greek: Λυσίμαχος Ανδρέα Καλοκαιρινός), and burned it down, killing him together with his family. Local Muslims then proceeded to slaughter any Christians they could find in the city. Some Christians sought refuge in the cathedral of the city, while much of the town was set ablaze. In support of the beleaguered British troops caught in a crossfire from every direction, Lieutenant John Marshall of Hazard did not wait for instruction and began to shell the town. His intervention saved a small number of British military personnel who managed to escape.

The incident lasted more than four hours. As a result, a part of the city was burnt and according to various estimates, 500 to 800 Christians were massacred by Muslim irregular groups. The massacre ended only when British warships began bombarding the city. Meanwhile, the responsible Ottoman officer, Ismail Pasha, contacted French Counter-admiral Édouard Pottier, the head of the international force, and offered to provide a half-battalion in support to the British forces to quell the disturbance. However, it was later revealed that Ismail's subordinate, the local Ottoman ruler (kaymakam) Ethem Pasha, was himself involved in the outbreak of the violence.

== Aftermath ==
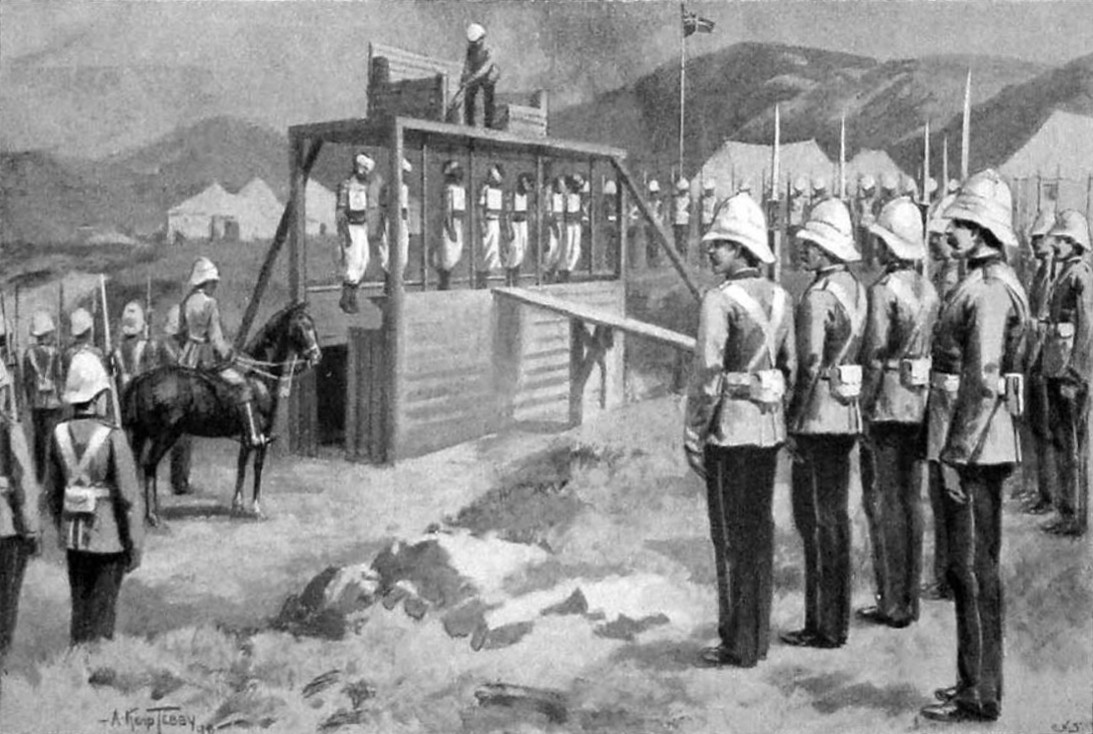
Engraving of the execution of the leaders of the irregular units that perpetrated the massacre.

Queen Victoria personally called for "drastic action", and Lord Salisbury pressed forward the military trials. One British sailor, Royal Naval Surgeon William Maillard, was awarded the Victoria Cross. The leaders of the Muslim perpetrators were hanged on the walls of Heraklion.

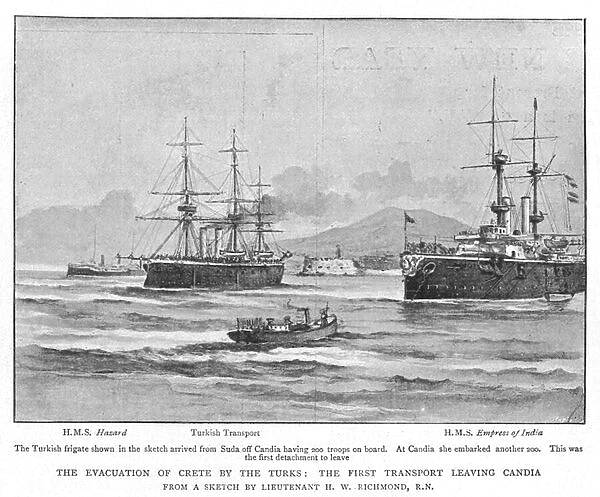
The evacuation of Crete by the Turks, the first Transport leaving Candia. The Graphic 1898

The incident accelerated the settlement of the "Cretan question". The ambassadors of France, Great Britain, Italy and Russia presented an ultimatum to the Ottoman Sultan, demanding the withdrawal of the Ottoman troops from Crete within a month. Two months later, on 28 November 1898, the last Ottoman troops left Crete, ending the 253-year Ottoman rule on the island. The following year Crete formed an autonomous state within the Ottoman Empire and in 1913 it became part of Greece.

The main street where the incidents occurred was later named "Martyrs of 25th August" (the old style calendar date of the event) to honor the victims of the massacre. A monument to the British seamen killed was erected in Upper Barrakka Gardens, Malta.

== Sources ==
- Carey, John (2003). International Humanitarian Law: Origins, Challenges, Prospects (3 Vols). Brill. ISBN 1571052674.
- Dadrian, Vahakn N. (2003). The History of the Armenian Genocide: Ethnic Conflict from the Balkans to Anatolia to the Caucasus. Berghahn Books. p. 52. ISBN 9781571816665.
- Holland, Robert (2012). Blue-Water Empire: The British in the Mediterranean since 1800. Penguin UK. ISBN 9781846145551.
- Kitromilides, Paschalis M. (2006). Eleftherios Venizelos: The Trials of Statesmanship. Edinburgh University Press. ISBN 9780748627004.
- Rodogno, Davide (2012). Against Massacre: Humanitarian Interventions in the Ottoman Empire, 1815–1914. Princeton University Press. ISBN 9780691151335.
