= Édouard Pottier =

French admiral (1839–1903)

- Born: 6 July 1839; Strasbourg, France
- Died: 3 August 1903 (aged 64); Rochefort, France
- Military career
- Allegiance: France
- Branch: French Navy
- Service years: 1855–1903
- Rank: Vice Admiral
- Commands: Coetlogon; Bayard; Bouvet; Vauban; Courbet; 4th Maritime District; International Squadron; Far East Squadron; West Mediterranean and Levant Squadron
- Conflicts: Second French intervention in Mexico; Conquest of Vĩnh Long Province; Cretan Revolt (1897–1898)
- Awards: Grand Cross of the Legion of Honour

Édouard Pottier (6 July 1839 – 3 August 1903) was a French admiral. During his career, he served in various regions of the world and took part in the operations leading to the occupation of Veracruz in 1861 during the Second French intervention in Mexico and the conquest of Vĩnh Long Province in 1867, which added that territory to French Cochinchina. Promoted to captain in 1886, he served in the Mediterranean and the Levant. Promoted to rear admiral in 1893 and vice admiral in 1898, he served as commander of the International Squadron, a multinational squadron which intervened in the Cretan Revolt of 1897–1898 against the Ottoman Empire. In 1900 he was appointed commander-in-chief of the French Far East Squadron.

== Biography ==
Pottier was born in Strasbourg on 6 July 1839 and entered the French Navy as a cadet at Brest in 1855. Promoted to midshipman on 1 August 1857, he made his first cruise, operating in the Pacific Ocean aboard the 30-gun sailing corvette Constantine. In March 1861, he was assigned to the sailing corvette Expeditive on the Iceland Station. He was promoted to enseigne de vaisseau (ship-of-the-line ensign) on 2 September 1861.

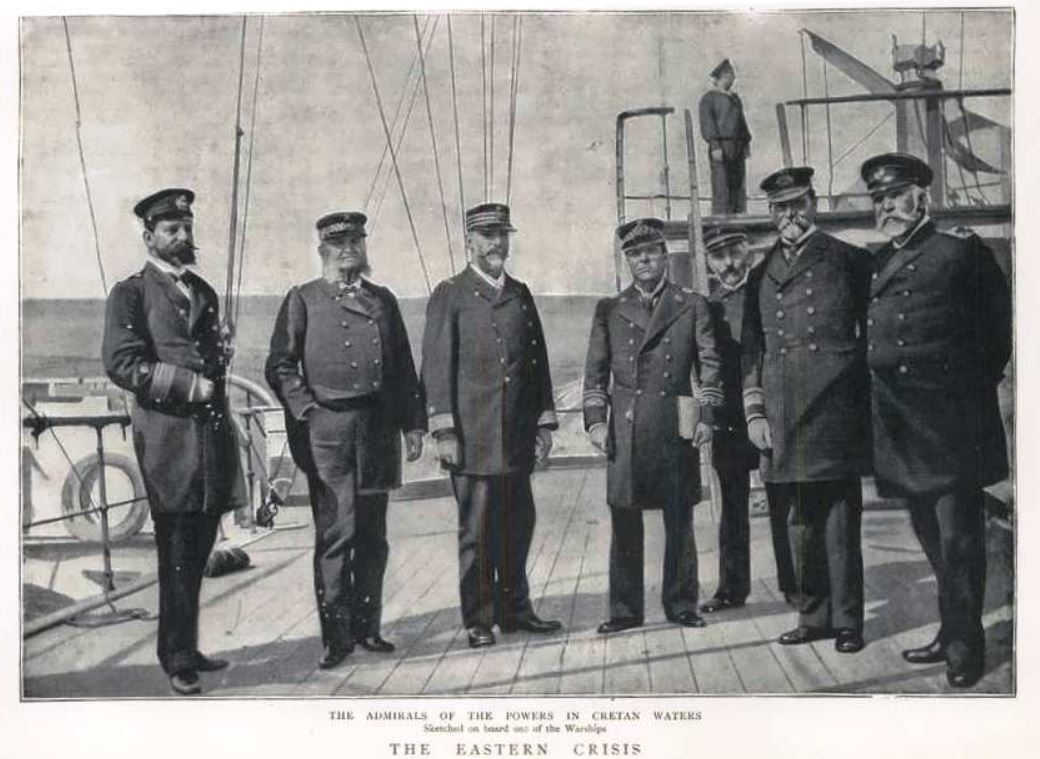
"The Admirals of the Powers in Cretan Waters" (Sketch from Black and White, 10 April 1897). Pottier, serving at the time as commander of the French contribution to the International Squadron, is second from left.

Illustration of units of the International Squadron arriving at Suda Bay, Crete, on 21 December 1898. Pottier's flagship, the protected cruiser Bugeaud, carrying Prince George of Greece and Denmark, who will take up duty as High Commissioner of the Cretan State, leads the column at right. She is followed (right to left) by the Russian armored cruiser Gerzog Edinburgski, the British battleship HMS Revenge, and the Italian battleship Francesco Morosini.

In October 1861, he reported aboard the aviso Marceau off Mexico as her second-in-command and took part in the Second French intervention in Mexico, participating in operations in the region of Veracruz. In January 1863, he reported aboard the 50-gun frigate Sybille for operations in the Indian Ocean and at New Caledonia.

Pottier became second-in-command of the screw transport Creuse in French Cochinchina in February 1865, beginning a long stay in East Asia and the Pacific that included duty aboard the river gunboat Hache. Promoted to lieutenant on 14 August 1866, he was ordered to the river gunboat Yatagan, aboard which he took part in the conquest of Vĩnh Long Province that year resulting in the incorporation of the province into French Cochinchina. Becoming a Knight of the Legion of Honour on 10 August 1868, he became second-in-command of the screw aviso Coetlogon in the China and Japan Division, and he became the ship's commanding officer in March 1871. He transferred to the transport Loire at New Caledonia in 1873.

Pottier's long stay in East Asia and the Pacific finally came to an end in 1874, when he became second-in-command of the screw aviso Forbin in the South Atlantic Division. He took part in a hydrographic survey in Patagonia from 1875 to 1876. From 1877 to 1881, he served aboard ships of the Antilles Division, first as second-in-command of the steam frigate Victoire from 1877 to 1878, then as second-in command of the cruiser Châteaurenault.

Promoted to capitaine de frégate (frigate captain) on 12 July 1881, Pottier became second-in-command of the steam frigate Flore, which was serving as a training ship for midshipmen. In August 1882, he reported aboard the ironclad battleship Dévastation as her second-in-command. In November 1882, he transferred to the new ironclad battleship Bayard – which was commissioned that month and was assigned to the Reserve Squadron – as her commanding officer. He became commanding officer of the aviso Bouvet in the Antilles Division in January 1884 and was made an Officer of the Legion of Honour on 18 November 1884.

Pottier received a promotion to capitaine de vaisseau (ship-of-the-line captain) on 8 February 1886 and took command of the battleship Vauban in the Levant Division in April 1887. In 1889, he became Director of Underwater Defenses for the 4th Maritime District, headquartered at Rochefort, France. From 1890 to 1891, he was commanding officer of the ironclad battleship Courbet in the Mediterranean and the Levant. In April 1892, he became the naval adjutant in Rochefort.

Promoted to rear admiral on 10 February 1893, Pottier became 4th Maritime District commander at Rochefort on 7 October 1893. He assumed command of a division of the Mediterranean Squadron in 1896. In 1897, he took command of the French division of the International Squadron, a multinational force that intervened in a Christian uprising against the Ottoman Empire on Crete, operating on and around Crete from February 1897 to December 1898 and managing the island's affairs via an Admirals Council consisting of the admirals commanding the national contingents of the squadron, which included Pottier. In 1898 he relieved Italian Vice Admiral Felice Napoleone Canevaro as commander of the International Squadron and president of the Admirals Council, remaining the squadron's senior officer and president of the council until the squadron's dissolution, and he was elevated to the Grand Cross of the Legion of Honour on 12 July 1898 and promoted to vice admiral on 11 October 1898. In the International Squadron's final act, Pottier steamed aboard his flagship, the protected cruiser Bugeaud – accompanied by the squadron's Italian flagship, the battleship Francesco Morosini, its Russian flagship, the armored cruiser Gerzog Edinburgski with the senior Russian commander Rear Admiral Nicholas Skrydloff aboard, and its British flagship, the battleship HMS Revenge with Rear-Admiral Gerard Noel aboard – on 19 December 1898 to Milos in the Aegean Sea, where Prince George of Greece and Denmark left his yacht on 20 December and embarked aboard Bugeaud. Escorted by the other three flagships, Bugeaud took him to Suda, Crete, where Prince George disembarked on 21 December 1898 to take up duties as High Commissioner of the new Cretan State under the suzerainty of the Ottoman sultan. His arrival on the island brought 229 years of direct Ottoman rule of Crete to an end. Pottier and the other admirals commanding the national contingents of the International Squadron promptly requested that their governments recall them, and the International Squadron was dissolved.

On 27 March 1899, Pottier became Maritime Prefect of the 4th Maritime District in Rochefort. On 1 August 1900, he became commander-in-chief of the Far East Squadron, with the ironclad battleship Redoutable as his flagship. Appointed as commander-in-chief of the West Mediterranean and Levant Squadron on 1 October 1902, he assumed that command in 1903, with the battleship Saint Louis as his flagship.

Pottier died on 3 August 1903 in Rochefort.

== Honors and awards ==
- Grand Cross of the Legion of Honour (20 September 1901)
- Commemorative medal of the Mexico Expedition
- Tonkin Expedition commemorative medal
- Ordre des Palmes académiques (English: Order of Academic Palms)
