= Nikolai Skrydlov =

Nikolai Illarionovich Skrydlov
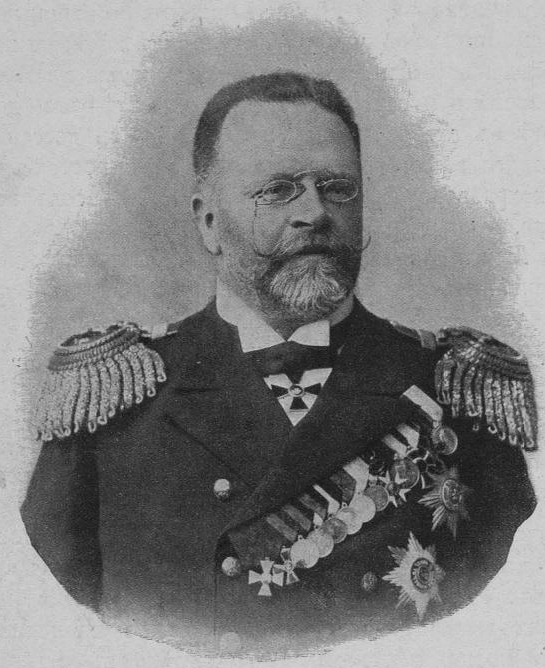
- Skrydlov in 1904
- Born: April 1, 1844; Pskov, Russian Empire
- Died: October 4, 1918 (aged 74); Petrograd, Russian SFSR
- Burial place: Tver, Russia
- Military career
- Allegiance: Russian Empire
- Branch: Russian Imperial Navy
- Service years: 1869–1907
- Rank: Admiral
- Conflicts: Russo-Turkish War; Cretan Revolt; Russo-Japanese War

Nikolai Illarionovich Skrydlov (Russian: Николай Илларионович Скрыдлов), (1 April 1844 – 4 October 1918) was an admiral in the Imperial Russian Navy.

== Biography ==
Skrydlov was born in Pskov to the family of a career naval officer in the Imperial Russian Navy, and graduated from the Sea Cadet Corps in 1862. He rose to prominence during the Russo-Turkish War (1877–78), where he commanded the small river minelayer Shutka on the Danube, which successful sank an Ottoman monitor on 8 June 1877. He was awarded the Order of St George, 4th class after he was wounded in combat.

Skrydlov was captain of the cruiser Dmitrii Donskoi from 1886 to 1889. In 1887 he took Dmitrii Donskoi on a voyage to the Far East, calling on Nagasaki in Japan on 19 May and remaining in Japanese waters for several months before reaching Vladivostok on 20 July. She overwintered in Japan and returned to the Baltic in January 1889. Skrydlov was reassigned to command the battleship Gangut from 1889 to 1893.

Promoted to rear admiral on 30 August 1893, Skrydlov was placed in charge of Russian torpedo warfare operations from 1894 to 1898, and commanded detachments of ships in the Baltic in 1895 and 1896. He commanded the Russian squadron in the Mediterranean from 1898 to 1899, participating in the International Squadron in Crete, and was the official representative of the Russian government at the funeral of French president Félix Faure in 1899. He was promoted to vice admiral on 3 July 1900.

Skrydlov became commander of the Russian Pacific Squadron from 1900 to 1902, and then of the Black Sea Fleet from 1903 to 1904. After the death of Admiral Stepan Makarov in combat during the Russo-Japanese War, Skrydlov was reappointed commander of the Russian Pacific Squadron on 1 April 1904. However, due to the Japanese blockade of Port Arthur, he was unable to reach his command, and returned from Vladivostok to St Petersburg on 20 December 1904 to accept an appointment to the Admiralty Board. He again commanded the Black Sea Fleet from 1906 to 1907, and retired from active service in August 1909 with the rank of admiral.

In October 1918, Skrydlov either died from hunger, or arrested by the Bolsheviks in the Red Terror and executed. His grave was at his family's ancestral estate in what is now the Oleninsky district of Tver.

== Awards ==
- Order of St. George, 4th class (1877)
- Order of St. Anne, 1st degree
- Order of St Vladimir 4th degree, 2nd degree.
- Order of St. Stanislaus 1st degree
- Order of the White Eagle
