= Spyros Kagiales =

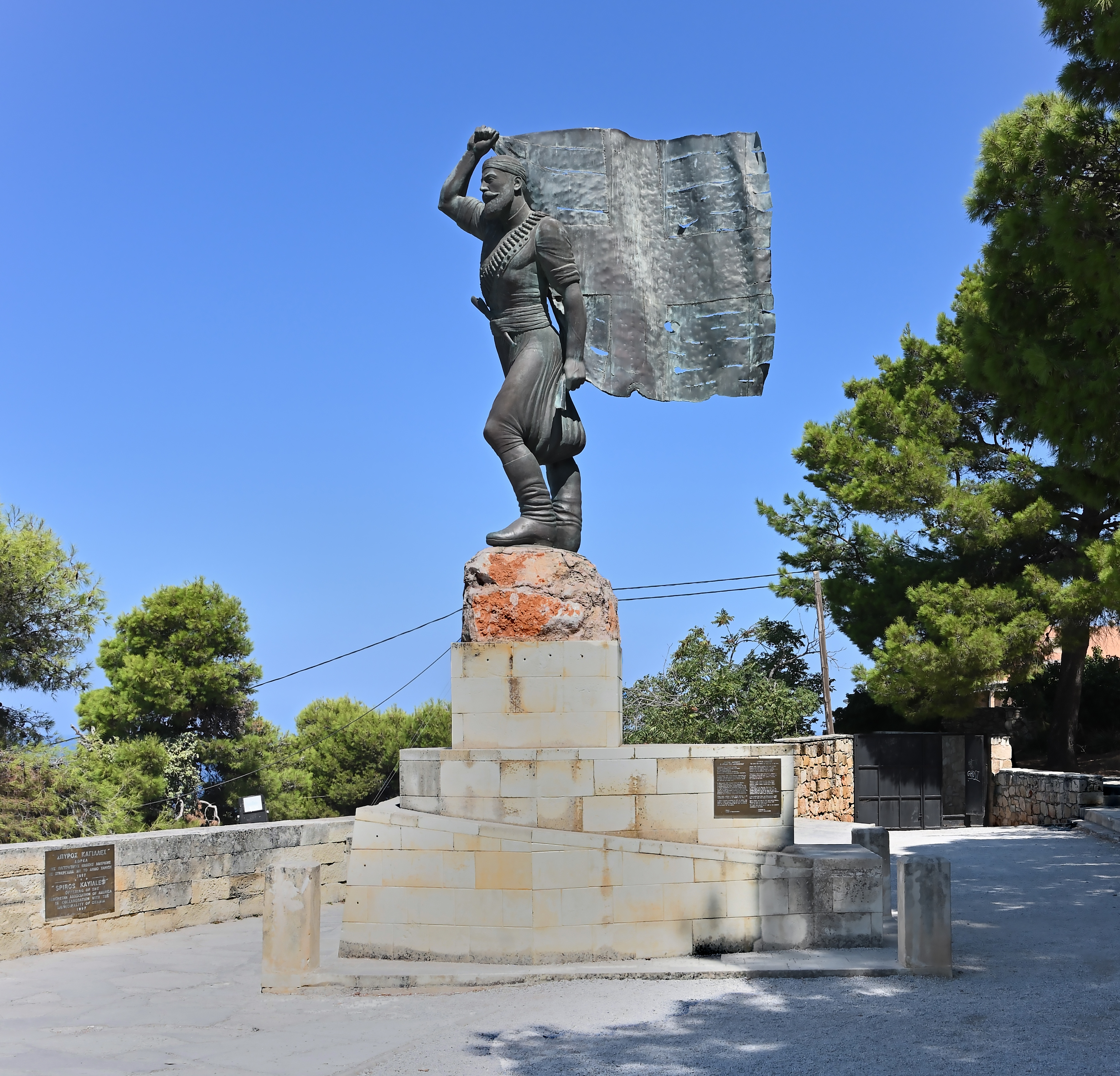
- A statue of Kagiales in Akrotiri
- Native name: Σπύρος Καγιαλές
- Born: 1872; Vilayet of Crete, Ottoman Empire (now Greece)
- Died: 5 September 1929 (aged 56–57) Halepa, Second Hellenic Republic
- Buried: Graveyard of Agia Fotini church, Halepa
- Allegiance: Kingdom of Greece
- Branch: Hellenic Army
- Conflicts: Greco-Turkish War (1897); Cretan Revolt; February Bombardment; Balkan Wars; First Balkan War; Battle of Driskos; Second Balkan War
- Spouse: Maria Kapnisaki
- Children: Georgios Kagiales; Irini Kagiale

Spiros Kagiales or Kagialedakis (Greek: Σπύρος Καγιαλές Καγιαλεδάκης; 1872–1929) was a Greek revolutionary from Crete and a soldier of the Hellenic Army who participated in the Cretan Revolts of 1895–1898 and the Balkan Wars.

== Biography ==
He was born in 1872 in Crete, then part of the Ottoman Empire, into the well-known Kagiales family. His mother Maria Ornerakis, was from Sfakia while his father, Dimitrios's family came from Gramvousa. The men of the family took part in the various struggles of their time for the freedom of Crete and its union with Greece.

From the beginning of the Cretan Revolt of 1897, Spyros Kagiales operated in Akrotiri together with his brothers Georgios, Manolis, Antonios and Sifis. He became famous for the bravery he showed while barricaded with other fighters at the church of the St. Elias on 9 February 1897. While under bombardment from the International Squadron, a shell shattered the mast of the Greek flag. Kagiales recovered the flag and, despite the bombardment, made his own body the pole. His actions gained the admiration of the Great Powers' fleet, resulting in the admirals ordering a ceasefire. The Italian commander of the fleet, Vice Admiral Felice Canevaro, wrote in his memoirs: "Raising the flag in such a heroic way was a moment in my life that I will never forget."

This event was a great diplomatic victory for the Greeks and played a major role in achieving autonomy for Crete a few months later, due to the submission of the admirals testimonies.

He later took part in the Battle of Driskos during the First Balkan War, where he was again distinguished for his bravery and was honoured with the awarding of special medals and diplomas.

His only son, Georgios, also fought in the Balkan Wars and distinguished himself on the battlefields of Macedonia, where he was killed. The loss of his son marked the rest of his life with grief.

His wife, Maria Kapnisaki, was from Kontopoula of Keramia. They also had a daughter, Irini.

He died in Halepa on 5 September 1929 and is buried in the family grave in the cemetery of Agia Fotini church.

== Legacy ==
A statue of him was unveiled on 21 July 1997 at the site of the bombardment in Akrotiri.

The municipality of Akrotiri annually celebrates the anniversary of the bombardment of 9 February 1897 and lays wreaths at his statue.
