= George Berovich =

Ottoman statesman

George Berovich Pasha
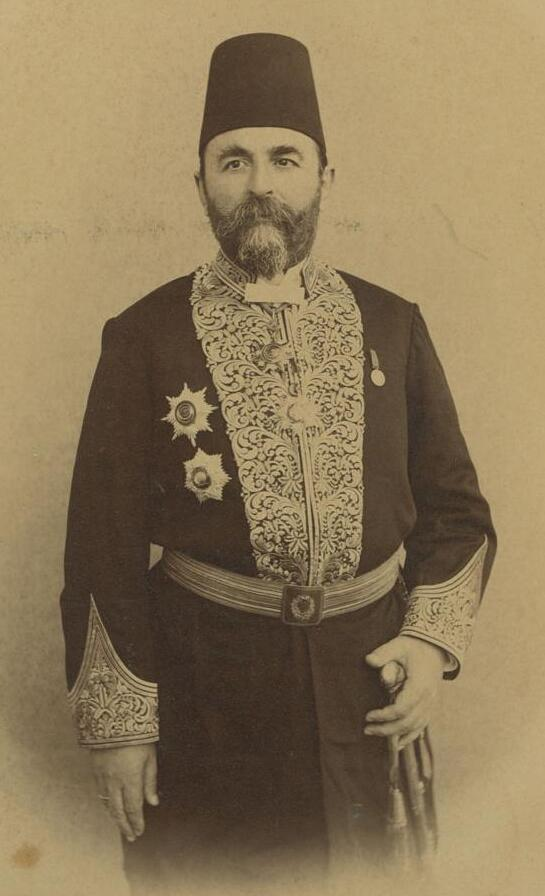

Prince of Samos
- In office 1895–1896
- Preceded by: Alexander Karatheodori Pasha
- Succeeded by: Stephanos Mousouros

Wāli of Crete
- In office 28 Jun 1896 – 14 Feb 1897
- Preceded by: Abdullah Pasha
- Succeeded by: Musavir Ismail Bey (Acting)

Personal details
- Born: 1845 Scutari, Sanjak of Scutari, Ottoman Empire (modern Albania)
- Died: 1925 Dubrovnik, Kingdom of Serbs, Croats, and Slovenes
- Profession: Statesman, Governor-General

George Berovich (Serbian: Đorđe Berović, Greek: Γεώργιος Βέροβιτς, Georgios Verovits, 1845–1897), known as Berovich Pasha (Turkish: Beroviç Paşa) was a Christian Ottoman statesman who served as Governor-General (wāli) of Crete and Prince of Samos.

== Biography ==
Berovich was born in Scutari, Sanjak of Scutari, Ottoman Empire (modern Albania). He was of Serb ethnic origin. He was the last of a line of Ottoman pashas of the Berovich family. In 19th-century Ottoman Empire, the government asked Christian families to send sons to be educated in Istanbul in order to provide Christian administrators for Christian-majority provinces.

He was appointed to several administrative positions in Turkey. Before coming to Samos, he was a counselor in the vilayet administration of Crete. He came to Samos in the midst of an armed rebellion by the Greek population of the island. Turkish army was poised to send punitive expedition but his intervention provided the mutually accepted compromise. To Greeks he was an independent Prince and the Sultan regarded him as his Pasha.

He settled the economy of the island and he was generally successful in his administration and popular with the Samians. Among other measures, he tried unsuccessfully to institute the permanence of civil servants, but reinforced the freedom of the press, promoted agriculture, and in 1895 he set up the Archaeological Museum of Samos.

He said in a speech before the Samian Parliament : "The Parliament and I have common boundaries. You shouldn't trespass my boundaries and I shouldn't trespass yours. So, we will be friends for ever".

He was reassigned to a new post by the Porte while he was on a tour at the Marathokampos region. His departure was generally viewed unfavorably by the Samian population.

A similar rebellion by the Greek population of Crete took place in 1897 and Pasha Berovich was sent by the Porte as Governor General, expected to achieve a similar compromise as on Samos. Unfortunately the fighting on Crete had already taken deep root and although Greeks regarded him favorably the Turkish population and army refused to obey. The Sultan tried to intervene in his favor by the award of the Order of Osmaniye but to no avail. He was even arrested by the Turkish army commander. The Great Powers who had laid a blockade of the island intervened to set him free. He was subsequently provided with a detachment of the Montenegrin Army as bodyguards. Their arrival in Chania was greeted with jubilation by the Greek population. After the establishment of the independent Cretan State, Pasha Berovich handed over the keys of the fort of Chania to Prince George of Greece and retired to Venice.
