= Robert Harris (Royal Navy officer, born 1843) =

Royal Navy Admiral (1843–1926)

Admiral Sir Robert Harris KCB KCMG
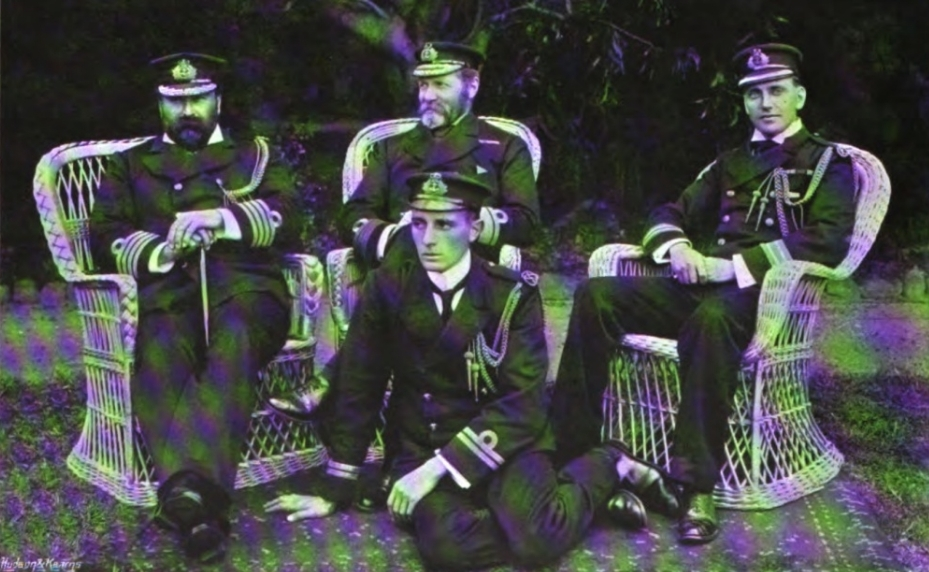
- Harris, seated centre, with his staff c.1899
- Born: 12 October 1843
- Died: 25 August 1926 (aged 82)
- Military career
- Allegiance: United Kingdom
- Branch: Royal Navy
- Rank: Admiral
- Commands: Cape of Good Hope Station; Royal Naval College, Greenwich
- Conflicts: Cretan Revolt; Second Boer War
- Awards: Knight Commander of the Order of the Bath; Knight Commander of the Order of St Michael and St George

Admiral Sir Robert Hastings Penruddock Harris KCB KCMG (12 October 1843 – 25 August 1926) was a Royal Navy officer who went on to be Commander-in-Chief, Cape of Good Hope Station.

== Naval career ==
Harris joined the Royal Navy in 1856. Promoted to captain in 1879 and to rear-admiral in 1891, he commanded the Training Squadron from 1893 to 1895 before becoming Second-in-Command of the Mediterranean Fleet in 1896. In that role he was involved in the Cretan Revolt.

He was appointed Commander-in-Chief, Cape of Good Hope Station in 1898 and played an important role in the Second Boer War: in October 1899 he formed a Naval Brigade and despatched the brigade to support General Frederick Forestier-Walker in defeating of the Boers at the Battle of Ladysmith – one of the guns surrendered by the Boers survives at Devonport today. Promoted to vice admiral in 1901 he went on to serve as President of the Royal Naval College, Greenwich in 1903 with promotion to admiral in 1904.

He lived at a house called The Brake in Yelverton, Devon.

== Family ==
He married Florence Cordelia Henn-Gennys; they had three sons and five daughters.

Military offices
Preceded by Sir Harry Rawson	Commander-in-Chief, Cape of Good Hope Station; 1898–1900	Succeeded by Sir Arthur Moore
Preceded by Sir Robert More-Molyneux	President, Royal Naval College, Greenwich; 1903–1906	Succeeded by Sir Arthur Fanshawe
