= Cretan Revolt (1897–1898) =

Successful insurrection against the Ottoman Empire

Cretan Revolt of 1897–1898
- Part of the Greco-Turkish War (1897) and the Cretan revolts
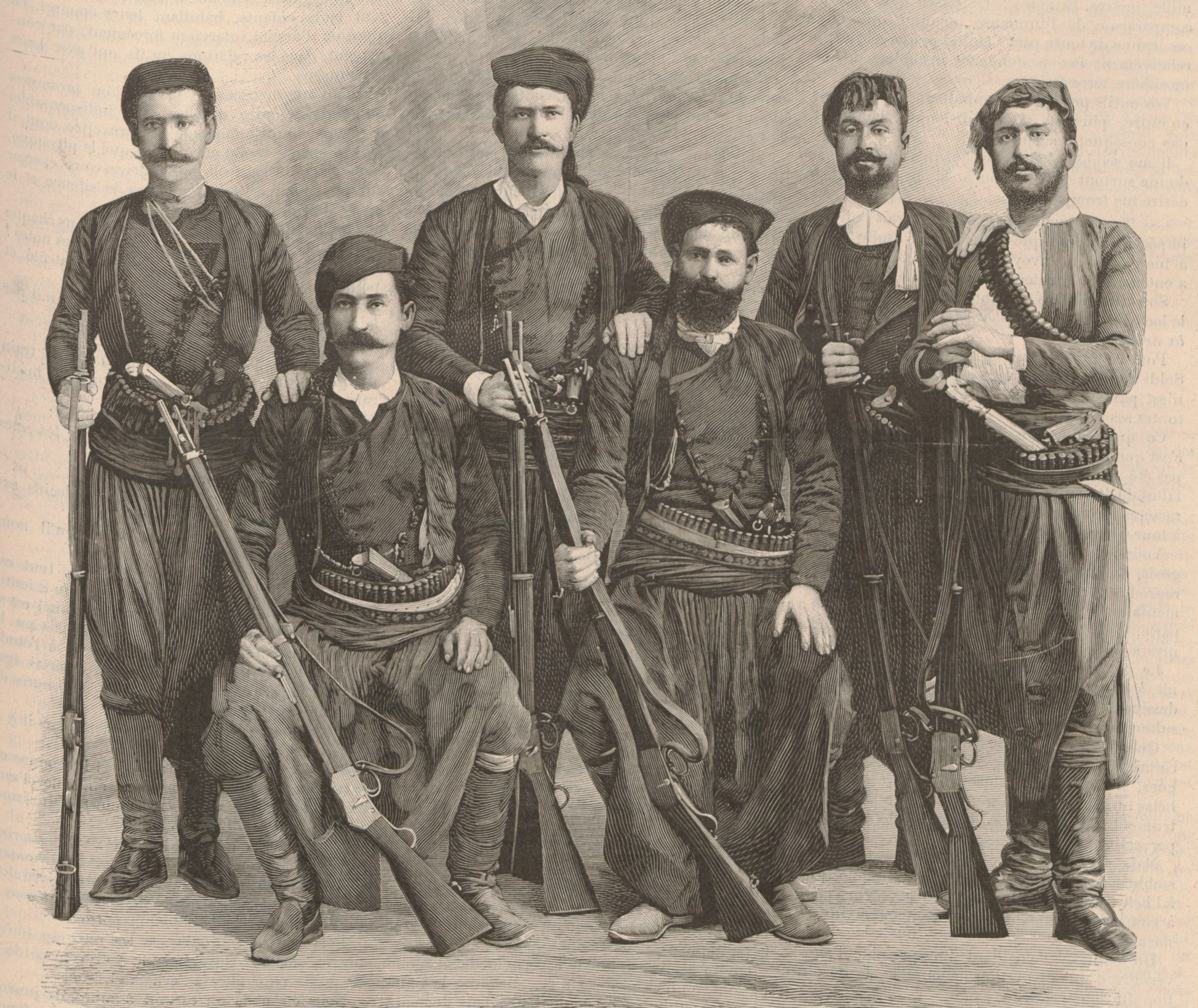
- Cretan rebel leaders in early 1897
Date	January 1897 – October 1898
Location	Ottoman Crete, Ottoman Empire (now Crete, Greece)
Result	Cretan victory: Cretan insurgents establish control over most of the island's countryside; Greek annexation of Crete prevented by the Great Powers; Withdrawal of the Greek expeditionary force in 1897; Withdrawal of Ottoman military forces from Crete in 1898; Establishment of the Cretan State under nominal Ottoman sovereignty

Belligerents
Cretan revolutionaries Kingdom of Greece	Ottoman Empire	International Squadron; United Kingdom of Great Britain and Ireland; French Third Republic; Kingdom of Italy; Russian Empire; German Empire; Austria-Hungary

Commanders and leaders
Eleftherios Venizelos (Kingdom of Greece) Theodoros Deligiannis (Kingdom of Greece) Timoleon Vassos (Kingdom of Greece) Prince George	(Ottoman Empire) Abdul Hamid II (Ottoman Empire) Turhan Pasha Përmeti (Ottoman Empire) Edhem Pasha	(United Kingdom of Great Britain and Ireland) Robert Harris (Kingdom of Italy) Felice Napoleone Canevaro

Strength
c. 30,000 Cretan irregulars 1,467 mainland Greek regulars	18,290 Ottoman regulars 15,000–20,000 armed Cretan Muslim auxiliaries	Unknown

Casualties and losses
Unknown	Unknown	Unknown
- 55,000 Christian civilians killed

The Cretan Revolt of 1897–1898 was a successful insurrection by the Greek Orthodox population of Crete against the rule of the Ottoman Empire, after decades of unrest and demands for union with Greece. The insurgents received arms and volunteers from the Kingdom of Greece. By the end of January 1897, they controlled most of the island's countryside, leaving the Ottomans largely confined to the principal towns.

In an effort to maintain the European balance of power, the Great Powers intervened in February 1897, preventing the Cretan insurgents and Greek troops from capturing the remaining Ottoman-held towns. The International Squadron, made up of warships from the United Kingdom, France, Italy, Russia, Germany and Austria-Hungary, occupied coastal towns, bombarded insurgent positions and blockaded the island to prevent supplies from reaching the Greek forces.

The revolt continued after Greece's defeat in the Greco-Turkish War (1897). Following the Candia massacre in September 1898, relations between the European forces and the Ottoman authorities broke down. The Great Powers then forced the Ottoman army to leave Crete, bringing direct Ottoman administration to an end. The island became an autonomous Cretan State under nominal Ottoman sovereignty, with Prince George of Greece as High Commissioner.

== Background ==
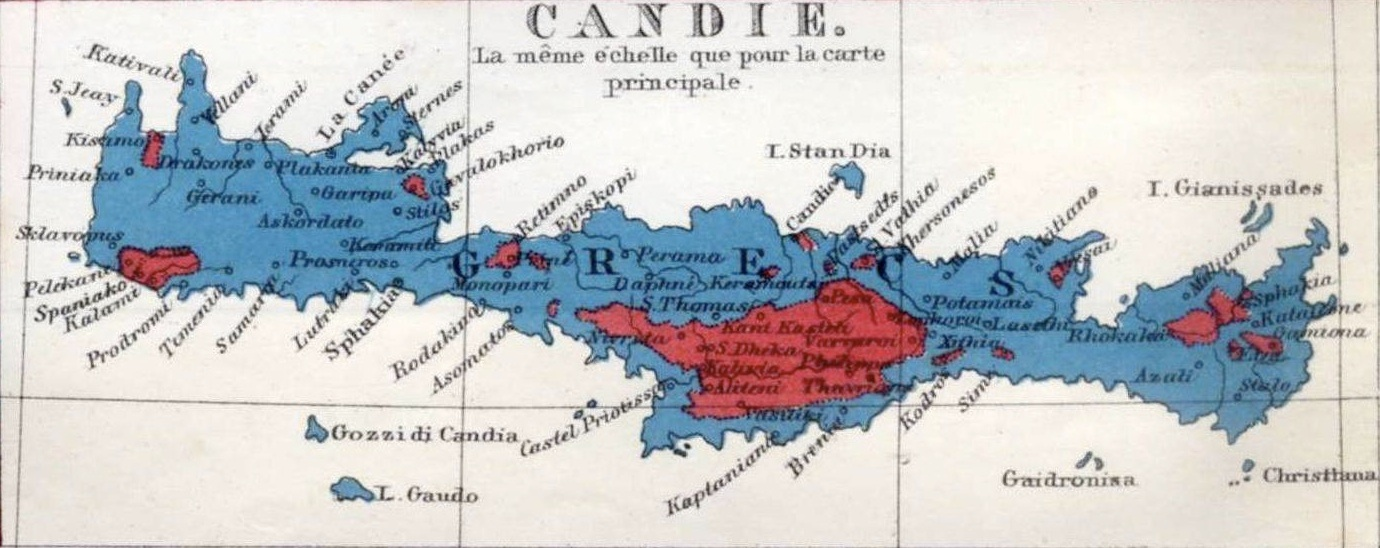
Map of the ethnic distribution in Crete (1861), by French ethnographer Guillaume Lejean. Cretan Greeks Cretan Muslims

=== Previous revolts ===
The Ottoman conquest of Crete ended in 1669 with the capture of Candia. Crete then became an Ottoman province.

During the Greek War of Independence, the Christian population of Crete also rose against Ottoman rule. Greece gained its independence, but Crete remained in the Ottoman Empire. Many Christian Cretans continued to seek union with Greece.

The Greek Cretans revolted again in 1866–1869 and 1878. Neither uprising achieved union with Greece, but the latter led to the Pact of Halepa, which granted greater local autonomy.

=== Cretan Greek activism ===
On 3 February 1895 (Julian calendar), representatives of the Cretan provinces of Apokoronas, Kydonia, Sfakia, Rethymno and Agios Vasileios met at Klema, near Chania. They drafted a memorandum to the Greek government and several European powers, asking for a Christian governor and international protection for Crete.

After the Hamidian massacres of Armenians in Anatolia, there was growing concern in Europe that Crete's Christian population might suffer similar violence.

The Ottomans replaced the Muslim governor with the Christian Alexander Karatheodoris. His appointment alarmed some Muslim Cretans, who feared rule by the Christian majority. Violence followed, with attacks and reprisals by armed groups from both communities.

The Cretan Assembly demanded the restoration of the provisions of the Pact of Halepa. On 18 June 1895, Karatheodoris dissolved the Assembly.

=== Cretan unrest, 1895–1896 ===
In September 1895, Greek Cretans formed a revolutionary assembly, which met at Krapi on 10 September. It demanded autonomy under a Christian governor appointed for five years, the restoration and extension of the rights granted by the Pact of Halepa, and an annual tribute to the Ottoman Empire.

Karatheodoris ordered the arrest of members of the revolutionary assembly. On 27 November 1895, fighting broke out at Vryses between Cretan insurgents and approximately 3,000 Ottoman troops commanded by Tayyar Pasha. After a day of fighting, the Ottoman troops withdrew without capturing the assembly members.

In March 1896, Karatheodoris was replaced by Turhan Pasha Përmeti as governor of Crete. Përmeti declared a general amnesty as part of a peace initiative, but the revolutionary assembly rejected it.

In May 1896, Cretan insurgents besieged the Ottoman garrison at Vamos, with fighting continuing until 18 May.

Meanwhile, attacks on Christians in Chania and the surrounding districts of Kydonia and Kissamos contributed to the escalation of communal violence.

=== Constitutional settlement of 1896 ===
To end the fighting, the consuls of the European powers proposed a new constitution for Crete. It called for:

- The appointment of a Christian governor for a five-year term, subject to the approval of the Great Powers.
- The allocation of twice as many public positions to Christians as to Muslims.
- The reorganisation of the Cretan gendarmerie under European officers.
- Greater economic, administrative and judicial autonomy under international supervision.

Both the Ottoman authorities and the revolutionary assembly accepted the agreement, and fighting subsided in August 1896.

In September 1896, the Ottomans appointed George Berovich Pasha, formerly governor of the Principality of Samos, as the new wāli of Crete.

== The revolt ==
=== January 1897 ===
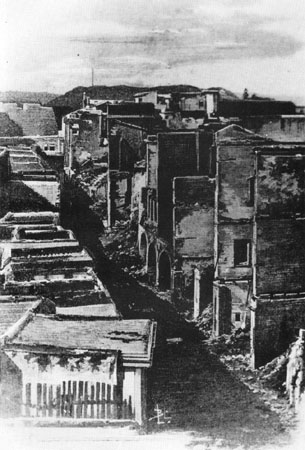
View of Chania after the burning of Christian neighbourhoods by Muslims.

Within a month of Berovich Pasha's appointment, sectarian violence began to increase again. The public prosecutor Kriaris was murdered in Chania and threats were made against the Christian community.

In January 1897, Muslim armed groups attacked and burned Christian neighbourhoods in Chania, including the residence of the bishop. Eleftherios Venizelos later recalled seeing Chania in flames and blamed these attacks for the outbreak of the revolt.

Venizelos established a camp on the Akrotiri peninsula, near Souda Bay, so that he could communicate with the European admirals. The insurgents raised the Greek flag and proclaimed their desire for union with Greece.

By the end of January 1897, the Cretan insurgents controlled most of the countryside. Historian Mick McTiernan writes that Ottoman rule was largely confined to the major towns, which were under siege by armed Christian Cretans. Many Muslims who had fled the fighting in rural areas took refuge in these towns. The insurgents received arms and volunteers from mainland Greece.

French police reports from February 1897 also described alleged activities involving members of the Armenian Revolutionary Federation, particularly Hratch Antreassian and Armen Garo. One report alleged that Antreassian had travelled to Crete with 20,000 francs from Armenian support funds in Europe. The reports described suspected contacts and funding, but did not establish the presence of an Armenian military contingent.

=== February 1897 ===
==== Greek intervention ====
In February 1897, Greek prime minister Theodoros Deligiannis ordered a military intervention in Crete under pressure from the opposition and public opinion.

Prince George was placed in command of a Greek naval force tasked with preventing the arrival of Ottoman reinforcements. Greek volunteers, arms and ammunition were also supplied to the Cretan insurgents.

In mid-February, about 1,500 Greek soldiers under Colonel Timoleon Vassos landed at Kolymbari, west of Chania. Vassos proclaimed the island's union with Greece in the name of King George I and began operations alongside the insurgents.

The Greek forces advanced towards Chania from the west, while Cretan insurgents occupied the heights overlooking the city from the east.

According to historian Efpraxia S. Paschalidou, Chania was close to falling to the Greek forces when the European admirals intervened. International troops occupied the city and prevented Vassos from capturing it. The Ottoman authorities accepted the occupation.

On 19 February, a force of approximately 600 Cretan insurgents, volunteers and Greek soldiers attacked and captured the Ottoman fortress at Voukolies.

==== European intervention ====
The International Squadron consisted of naval forces from the United Kingdom, France, Italy, Russia, Germany and Austria-Hungary. It acted independently of the Greek expeditionary force.

The European governments wanted to prevent a wider Greco-Ottoman war and keep Crete under Ottoman sovereignty. Their forces occupied the main coastal towns, including Chania, Rethymno, Candia and Sitia, and established protected zones around Ottoman positions.

The international troops prevented attacks on Ottoman garrisons, while the Greek forces were instructed not to engage them.

After the capture of Voukolies, the Great Powers demanded a ceasefire and threatened to prevent further military supplies from reaching the Greek expeditionary force. Vassos declared that he would avoid the four cities occupied by European forces but intended to occupy the remainder of the island.

==== Bombardment of Akrotiri ====
On 21 February 1897, European warships bombarded Cretan insurgent positions on the Akrotiri peninsula, including the heights of Prophet Elijah, where Venizelos had established his headquarters.

The vessels involved included the British HMS Revenge, HMS Dryad and HMS Harrier, the German SMS Kaiserin Augusta, and the Austro-Hungarian SMS Kaiserin und Königin Maria Theresia.

Paschalidou attributes the bombardment to the enforcement of an internationally established buffer zone, which insurgents had entered while pursuing Ottoman troops. The French and Italian vessels did not participate in this particular bombardment.

The bombardment drew protests in Greece and criticism in parts of the European press. It also became known for the defence of the Greek flag by the insurgent Spiros Kayales.

According to the account of C. Kerofilas, the European fleet sought to force the removal of the Greek flag from the insurgent position. Venizelos refused to lower it, declaring that the European vessels could use their guns but that the flag would not fall.

=== March 1897 ===
In March 1897, the European fleets tightened the blockade to stop further Greek supplies and reinforcements from reaching the insurgents.

European forces also protected Ottoman-held positions elsewhere on the island and evacuated besieged garrisons.

At Kandanos, where Muslim inhabitants and Ottoman troops were besieged by Cretan insurgents, an international force of approximately 500 men landed near Palaiochora. The expedition evacuated Muslim civilians and Ottoman soldiers to Chania. The evacuation went ahead despite objections from the insurgents.

In eastern Crete, the insurgent commander Aristotelis Korakas besieged Ottoman-held positions around Candia and later moved towards Ierapetra. According to Paschalidou, an Italian warship intervened against his forces at Ierapetra, using naval artillery and machine-gun fire. French warships also intervened to prevent Greek attacks on Spinalonga.

On 10 March, Venizelos received the French, Italian and British admirals. The Great Powers considered three possible solutions to the Cretan question:

- Restoration of full Ottoman authority.
- Union of Crete with Greece.
- Autonomy for Crete under Ottoman sovereignty.

Britain favoured autonomy, which would prevent Crete's annexation by Greece while leaving the island formally within the Ottoman Empire.

The European powers proposed autonomy rather than immediate union with Greece. The Greek government rejected the proposal, under pressure from public opinion.

In March, the Great Powers proclaimed their intention to establish an autonomous Cretan administration under Ottoman suzerainty and enforced their naval blockade.

The admirals also intervened in the siege of the Ottoman fort at Malaxa, where the besieged garrison faced shortages of food. They demanded that the Cretan insurgents withdraw, threatening bombardment if necessary.

European forces prevented the capture of several Ottoman positions, but they did not restore Ottoman control over the countryside.

=== April–July 1897 ===
==== Greco-Turkish War and Greek withdrawal ====
On 17 April 1897, the Ottoman Empire declared war on Greece, beginning the Greco-Turkish War (1897). The principal fighting occurred in Thessaly and Epirus rather than Crete.

After the Greek army's defeat on the mainland, the Great Powers again pressed Greece to withdraw its troops from Crete.

In May 1897, Vassos and the remaining Greek regular troops withdrew from the island. Greece also abandoned its immediate attempt to annex Crete.

The revolt continued after the Greek army withdrew. Cretan insurgents still held much of the countryside and demanded that Ottoman troops leave the island.

On 13 May, Venizelos declared that the insurgents would not lay down their arms until the last Ottoman soldier had left the island.

==== Continuation of the revolt ====
The International Squadron continued to occupy the principal towns and maintained its blockade of the island. British and other European forces established positions between Ottoman garrisons and the insurgents to reduce the possibility of renewed fighting.

International troops patrolled insurgent-held areas, but the Cretans generally avoided confronting them directly, because they did not consider them as enemies and as to not provoke them.

On 10 July 1897, at Armeni, Ioannis Sfakianakis was elected president of the revolutionary assembly. He proposed a Cretan government headed by a European prince chosen by the Great Powers and approved by the Ottomans.

In August, Venizelos assumed a leading position in the revolutionary assembly, which subsequently met at Archanes. In November, the revolutionary assembly became the Cretan Assembly.

Towards the end of 1897, Ottoman attempts to reinforce their remaining garrisons were opposed by the European powers.

Russia proposed the appointment of Prince George of Greece as governor of Crete. Great Britain and France supported the proposal, while Germany and Austria-Hungary initially opposed it.

=== Political developments in 1898 ===
In March 1898, Germany announced its withdrawal from the Cretan intervention. Austria-Hungary also withdrew from active involvement, leaving Great Britain, France, Italy and Russia as the four principal protecting powers.

The four remaining powers proceeded with plans for Cretan autonomy. They established an administrative council and began handing local affairs to Christian Cretan representatives.

On 1 July 1898, the Council of Admirals authorised the Cretan Assembly to elect an executive committee. A five-member committee, including Venizelos, was subsequently elected.

By mid-1898, the transfer of administrative powers to Christian Cretans had increased tensions between the European forces, the Ottoman authorities and sections of the Muslim population.

== Ottoman withdrawal from Crete ==
In September 1898, the international authorities sought to hand over customs and tax collection in Candia to the new administration. The Ottoman authorities and sections of the Muslim population opposed the move.

On 6 September 1898, violence erupted in Candia when British troops attempted to take control of a customs office. Armed Muslim irregulars attacked the British detachment, and fighting spread through the city.

During the Candia massacre, fourteen British soldiers were killed and twenty-seven wounded. The British vice-consul and other British subjects were also killed, together with a large number of Cretan Christians. British warships subsequently opened fire during the disturbances.

The massacre brought relations between the European forces and the Ottoman authorities to a breaking point. Until then, the International Squadron had generally protected Ottoman-held positions from the insurgents. Afterwards, the Great Powers sought the removal of the Ottoman troops.

The British reinforced their troops on the island, arrested those accused of participating in the killings and organised military trials. Several participants were sentenced to death.

The four protecting powers subsequently demanded the withdrawal of all Ottoman troops from Crete. The Ottoman government initially resisted the timetable for evacuation, but the European powers threatened military action, including bombardment of Ottoman positions.

The Ottoman troops began leaving in October 1898. By early November, the main garrisons had been evacuated and the European powers had taken charge of the remaining fortifications and administration.

This ended direct Ottoman military and administrative rule in Crete, although the island remained nominally under Ottoman sovereignty.

After the Ottoman withdrawal, the international forces began disarming the insurgents and maintaining order during the changeover to an autonomous government.

== Autonomy of Crete ==
The four protecting powers agreed to establish an autonomous Cretan administration under their supervision.

In November 1898, the representatives of France, Italy, Great Britain and Russia proposed to King George I of Greece that his son, Prince George, be appointed High Commissioner of Crete.

Prince George was appointed for an initial three-year term. He was to restore order, organise the administration and protect the rights of Christian and Muslim inhabitants. Crete would remain nominally under Ottoman sovereignty, with its autonomous status guaranteed by the four powers.

Each of the four powers also agreed to advance financial assistance to the new administration.

Prince George arrived in Crete in December 1898 and was welcomed by the European admirals and large crowds of Christian Cretans. His arrival marked the beginning of the new administration.

The establishment of the Cretan State brought the revolt to an end. Crete had gained substantial autonomy, though union with Greece had not yet been achieved.

== Aftermath ==
Prince George's government appointed a sixteen-member committee, composed of twelve Christians and four Muslims, to draft a constitution for Crete.

The constitution was adopted in January 1899. Elections were subsequently held for an assembly consisting of 138 Christian and 50 Muslim deputies.

The question of union with Greece remained unresolved. Prince George and Venizelos soon disagreed over the island's administration and how union might be achieved.

In 1905, Venizelos led the Theriso revolt against Prince George's administration, criticising its political practices and its failure to secure union with Greece.

The outbreak of the First Balkan War in 1912 opened the way for union. Cretan deputies entered the Greek Parliament, and on 1 December 1913 the union of Crete with Greece was formally recognised.

=== Migration ===
On 29 December 1898, Prince George of Greece, the new governor of the island, issued a proclamation to Cretan Muslims, inviting them to remain in Crete under equal protection of the law, while also assuring them that they were free to leave if they wished. The proclamation stated: "You are free to remain on the island or to depart at will". Those wishing to leave could obtain passports without conditions from the military authorities.

Ottoman authorities opted for the latter and encouraged the emigration of Cretan Muslims to Anatolia, while the Great Powers also accepted this policy. In 1899, Sultan Abdülhamid II issued an order proclaiming that Cretan Muslims should leave Crete. A 23 May 1899 The New Zealand Times article noted that: "In compliance with the order of the Sultan, issued from Constantinople, the Moslems of Crete are emigrating from the island in large numbers". Between 1897 and 1900, the Muslim population of Crete fell from approximately 70,000 to 33,496 due to this emigration.

== See also ==
- Greco-Turkish War (1897)
- International Squadron (Cretan intervention, 1897–1898)
- Candia massacre
- Cretan State

== Sources ==
- An Index of Events in the Military History of the Greek Nation, Hellenic Army General Staff, Army History Directorate, Athens, 1998.
- S. M. Chester, Life of Venizelos, with a Letter from His Excellency M. Venizelos, Constable, London, 1921.
- Clowes, William Laird (1996). The Royal Navy: A History from the Earliest Times to the Death of Queen Victoria. Vol. 7. Chatham Publishing. ISBN 1-86176-016-7.
- Detorakēs, Theocharēs E. (1994). History of Crete. Detorakis. ISBN 9789602207123.
- Holland, Robert; Markides, Diana (2006). The British and the Hellenes: Struggles for Mastery in the Eastern Mediterranean, 1850–1960. Oxford University Press. ISBN 978-0-19-924996-1.
- C. Kerofilas, Eleftherios Venizelos: His Life and Work, John Murray, 1915.
- Paschalis M. Kitromilides, Eleftherios Venizelos: The Trials of Statesmanship, Edinburgh University Press, 2008.
- McTiernan, Mick (2014). A Very Bad Place Indeed For a Soldier: The British Involvement in the Early Stages of the European Intervention in Crete, 1897–1898. King's College London.
- McTiernan, Mick (2021). "'The Most Awfully Rotten Job Altogether': British Troops in Crete, 1897–1899". Journal of the Society for Army Historical Research. 99: 313–338.
- Paschalidou, Efpraxia S. (2009). "Military Operations of the Great Powers During the Cretan Revolution (1897): The Greek Perspective" (PDF). Bilten Slovenske vojske. 11 (1): 119–133.
- Jean Tulard, Histoire de la Crète, Presses Universitaires de France, 1979.
