= Italian ironclad Italia =

Ironclad warship of the Italian Royal Navy

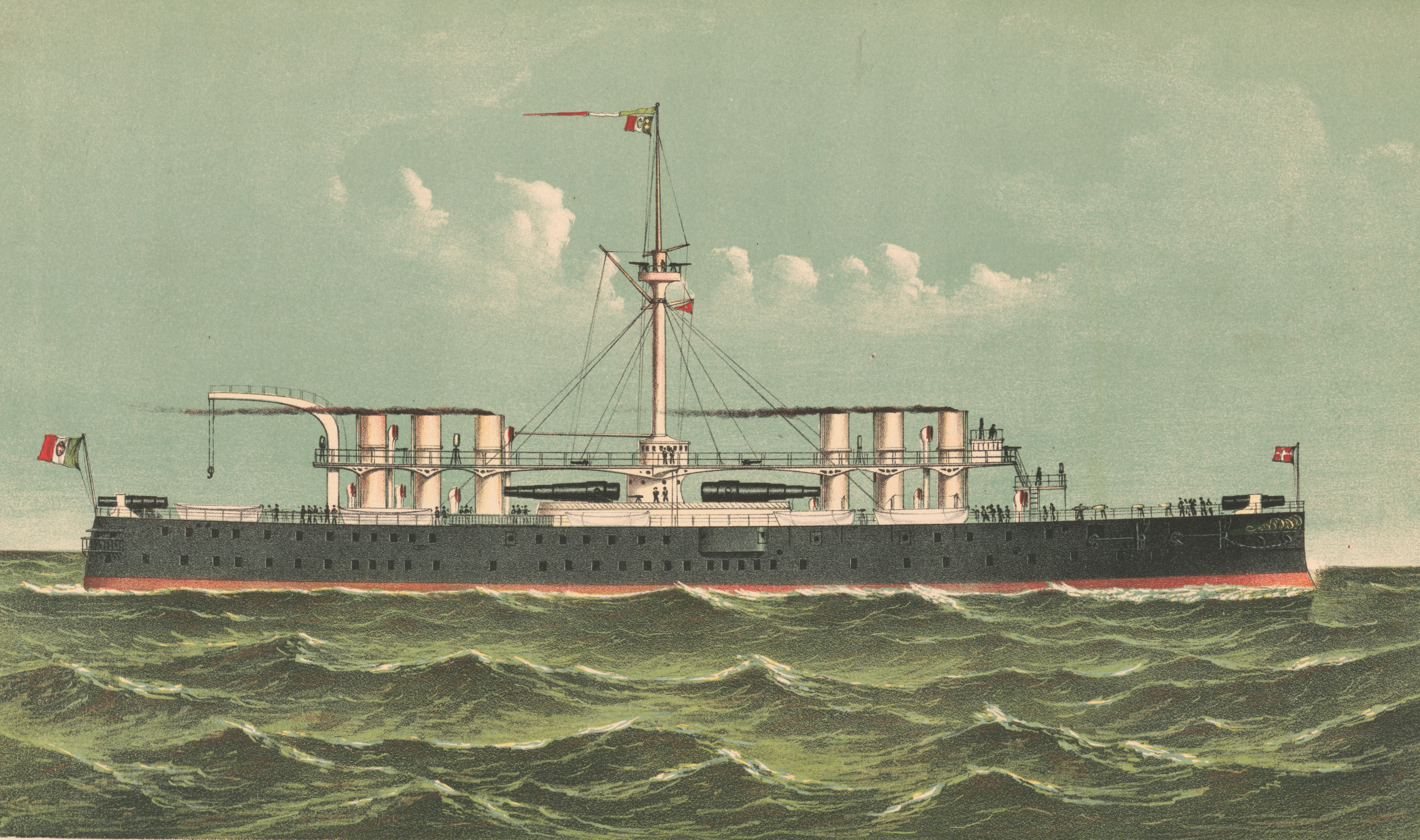
- Illustration of Italia c. 1891

History

Italy
- Name: Italia
- Namesake: Italy
- Operator: Regia Marina
- Builder: Regio Cantiere di Castellammare di Stabia
- Laid down: 3 January 1876
- Launched: 29 September 1880
- Completed: 16 October 1885
- Stricken: 16 November 1921
- Fate: Scrapped, 1921

General characteristics
- Class & type: Italia-class ironclad
- Displacement: Normal: 13,678 long tons (13,897 t); Full load: 15,407 long tons (15,654 t)
- Length: 124.7 m (409 ft 1 in) length overall
- Beam: 22.54 m (74 ft)
- Draft: 8.75 m (28 ft 8 in)
- Installed power: 15,907 ihp (11,862 kW); 26 fire-tube boilers
- Propulsion: 4 × compound steam engines; 4 × screw propellers
- Speed: 17.5 knots (32.4 km/h; 20.1 mph)
- Range: 5,000 nautical miles (9,260 km) at 10 knots (19 km/h; 12 mph)
- Complement: 37 officers; 719 enlisted men
- Armament: 4 × 432 mm (17 in) guns; 8 × 149 mm (5.9 in) guns; 4 × 120 mm (4.7 in) guns; 4 × 356 mm (14 in) torpedo tubes
- Armor: Deck: 76 to 102 mm (3 to 4 in); Barbette: 480 mm (19 in); Conning tower: 300 mm (11.8 in)

Italia was an Italian ironclad battleship built for the Italian Regia Marina (Royal Navy), the lead ship of the Italia class. She and her single sister ship, Lepanto, had lengthy construction times. Italia was laid down in January 1876, launched in September 1880, and completed in October 1885. She was armed with a main battery of four 432 mm (17 in) guns mounted in a central barbette and was capable of a top speed of 17.8 knots (33.0 km/h; 20.5 mph). Unusually for ships of that era, Italia had an armored deck rather than the typical belt armor.

Italia spent the first two decades of her career in the Active and Reserve Squadrons, where she took part in annual training maneuvers with the rest of the fleet. She was withdrawn from service in 1905 for a significant modernization. Upon returning to service in 1909, Italia was employed as a training ship. During the Italo-Turkish War of 1911–1912, the ship provided fire support to Italian troops defending Tripoli in Libya. She was used as a floating battery at Brindisi after Italy entered World War I in 1915. The ship was rebuilt as a grain carrier in December 1917 – June 1918. Italia served in this capacity for only a short time, being stricken in November 1921 and then scrapped.

== Design ==
The Italia class, designed by Benedetto Brin, was ordered in the mid-1870s as part of a naval construction program aimed at countering the Austro-Hungarian Navy. They were based on the preceding Italian design, the Duilio class, though they incorporated several significant improvements. These included more powerful main guns, higher freeboard, and greater speed. Their speed came at the expense of armor protection, and their hulls carried only light deck plating.

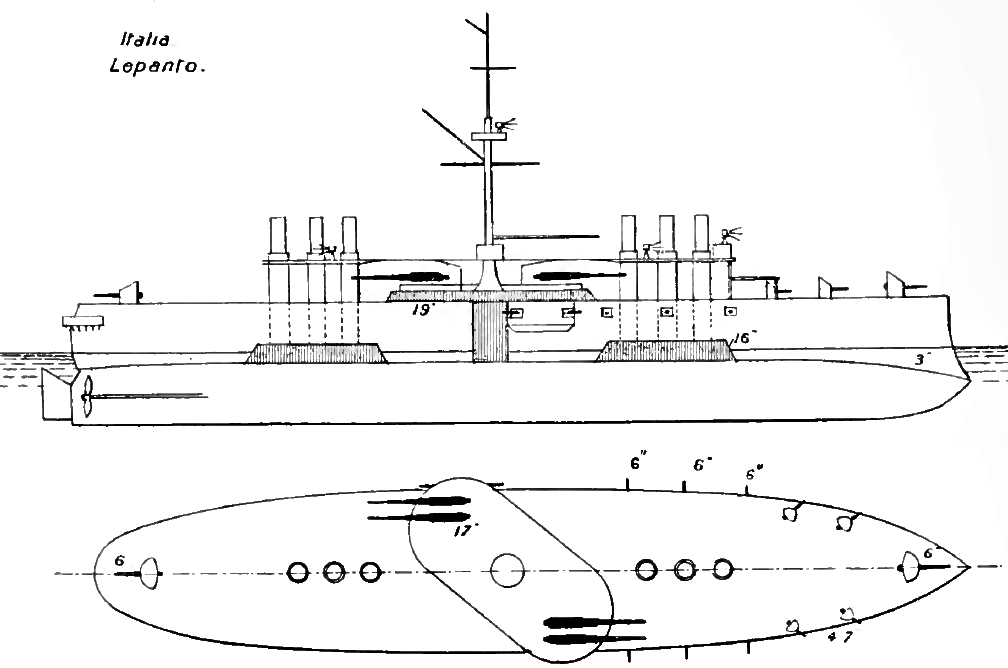
Plan and profile drawing of the Italia class

Italia was 124.7 m (409 ft 1 in) long overall and had a beam of 22.54 m (74 ft) and an average draft of 8.75 m (28 ft 8 in). She displaced 13,678 long tons (13,897 t) normally and up to 15,407 long tons (15,654 t) at full load. She had a crew of 37 officers and 719 enlisted men.

Her propulsion system consisted of four compound steam engines each driving a single screw propeller, with steam supplied by sixteen coal-fired, oval fire-tube boilers. Her engines produced a top speed of 17.5 knots (32.4 km/h; 20.1 mph) at a maximum of 15,907 indicated horsepower (11,862 kW). She could steam for 5,000 nautical miles (9,300 km; 5,800 mi) at a speed of 10 knots (19 km/h; 12 mph).

Italia was armed with a main battery of four 432 mm (17 in) guns, mounted in two pairs en echelon in a central barbette. Three guns were 26-caliber guns, while the fourth was a slightly longer 27-caliber version. She carried a secondary battery of eight 149 mm (5.9 in) 26-caliber guns and four 119 mm (4.7 in) 23-caliber guns. As was customary for capital ships of the period, she carried four 356 mm (14 in) torpedo tubes in the hull above the waterline, two per broadside.

Unlike other ships built at the time, Italia dispensed with vertical belt armor. Brin believed that contemporary steel alloys could not effectively defeat armor-piercing shells of the day, and so he discarded it completely. Italia was instead protected by an armored deck that was 76 to 102 mm (3 to 4 in) thick. Her conning tower was armored with 300 mm (11.8 in) of steel plate on the sides. The barbette had 480 mm (19 in) of steel armor.

== Service history ==
=== Construction – 1902 ===
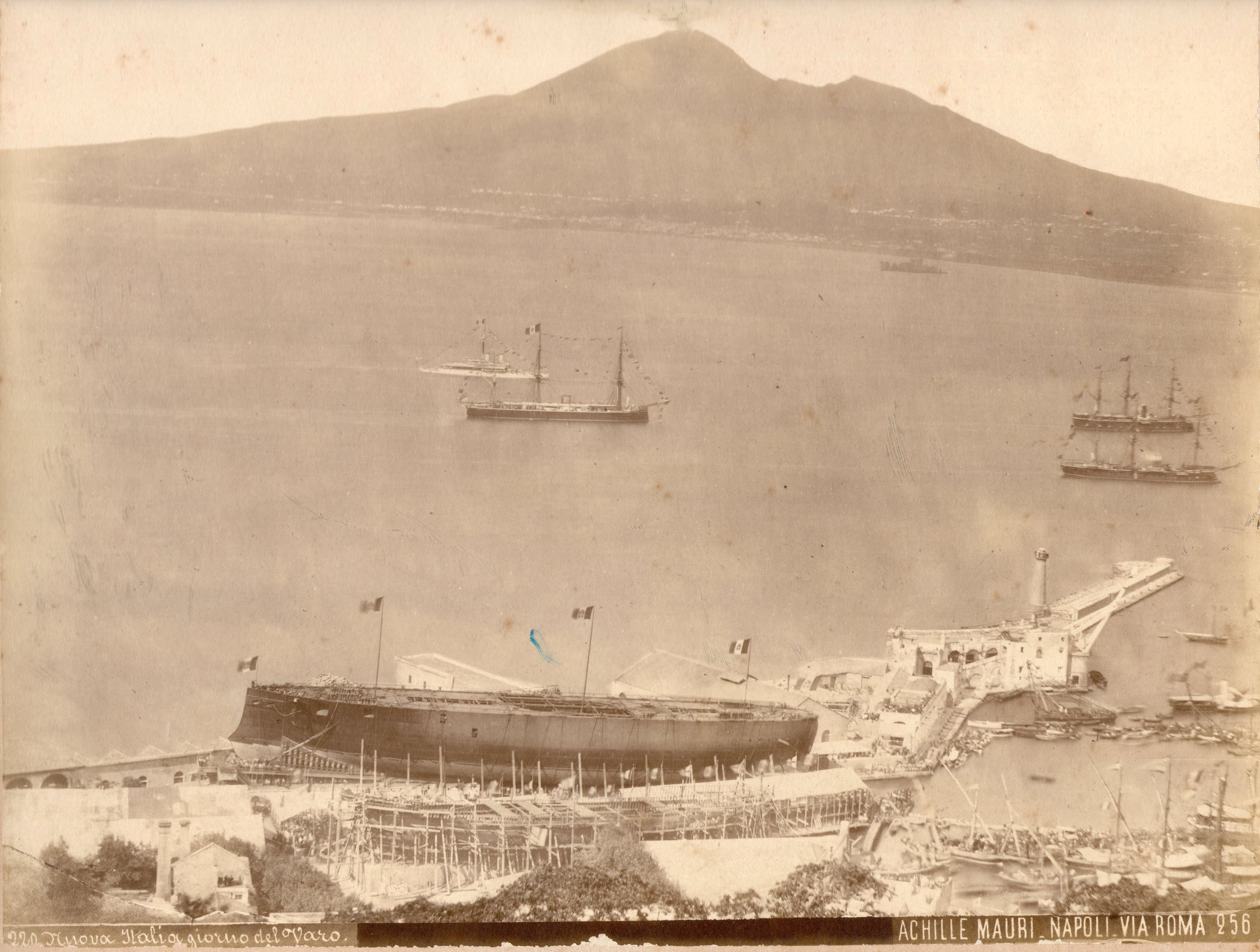
Italia at her launching

Italia was under construction for nearly 10 years. (Note: In comparison, the preceding ironclad Duilio took only seven years to build, and the subsequent ironclad Ruggiero di Lauria took less than six and a half years.) She was laid down at Regio Cantiere di Castellammare di Stabia shipyard on 3 January 1876, originally under the name Stella D'Italia. She then spent over four-and-a-half years on the building ways and was launched on 29 September 1880. She was not completed for another five years, her construction finally being finished on 16 October 1885. She nonetheless was completed 22 months before her sister Lepanto, which took almost 11 years to build. She began sea trials in December, which continued through March 1886. She failed to reach her designed speed, due to insufficient steam capacity and poor ventilation for her boilers. At some point after her completion, Italia received several smaller caliber guns, including two 75 mm (3 in) guns, twelve 57 mm (2.24 in) 40-caliber guns, twelve 37 mm (1.5 in) Hotchkiss revolver cannon, and two machine guns.

Italia entered service on 10 January 1886 and went on her first training cruise in April. She visited a number of Italian ports, including Naples, Palermo, Cagliari, Livorno, and Palmas, before returning to the naval base at La Spezia. The ship next went on a cruise to visit ports in France, Spain, and Portugal over the course of May and June. Italia joined the navy's primary unit, the Permanent Squadron (Squadra Permaente) on 11 July and became its flagship on 1 August, when its commander, Vice Admiral Orengo hoisted his flag aboard the ship. In October, Italia and the rest of the squadron visited Greece and the Ottoman Empire. The ship was laid up in 1887 and saw no active service that year.

The ship was recommissioned in January 1888 and returned to the Permanent Squadron. She took part in the annual 1888 fleet maneuvers, along with the ironclads Duilio, Lepanto, Enrico Dandolo, and San Martino, a protected cruiser, four torpedo cruisers, and numerous smaller vessels. The maneuvers consisted of close-order drills and a simulated attack on and defense of La Spezia. Later that year, the ship was present during a naval review held for the German Kaiser Wilhelm II during a visit to Italy. Italia was again placed in reserve in 1890. She spent the next five years alternating between active service and reserve status. She served as the flagship of the 2nd Division of the Active Squadron during the 1893 fleet maneuvers, along with the ironclad Andrea Doria, the torpedo cruiser Iride, and four torpedo boats. During the maneuvers, which lasted from 6 August to 5 September, the ships of the Active Squadron simulated a French attack on the Italian fleet. Beginning on 14 October 1894, the Italian fleet, including Italia, assembled in Genoa for a naval review held in honor of King Umberto I at the commissioning of the new ironclad Re Umberto. The festivities lasted three days.

In 1895, Italia and Lepanto were assigned to the Reserve Squadron, along with the ironclads Ruggiero di Lauria and Re Umberto. That year, she served as the flagship of the unit's 3rd Division; her activities that year largely consisted of training cruises. Italia and her sister ship Lepanto nearly collided during that year's fleet maneuvers. She remained in the unit through 1896, during which time she also served as a gunnery training ship. In July, the fleet was reorganized and the Maneuver Squadron (Squadra di Manovra was created, and Italia became its flagship. Italia was not assigned to either the active or reserve squadrons in 1898, though she took part in the annual fleet maneuvers that year. In the early 1890s, the Italian Navy considered rebuilding Italia along the same lines as Enrico Dandolo, which had received new, quick-firing 254 mm (10 in) guns in place of her slow 432 mm guns. Italia and her sister were to have their guns replaced with new 340 mm (13.4 in) guns, but by 1902 this plan had been abandoned as too costly.

=== 1905–1921 ===
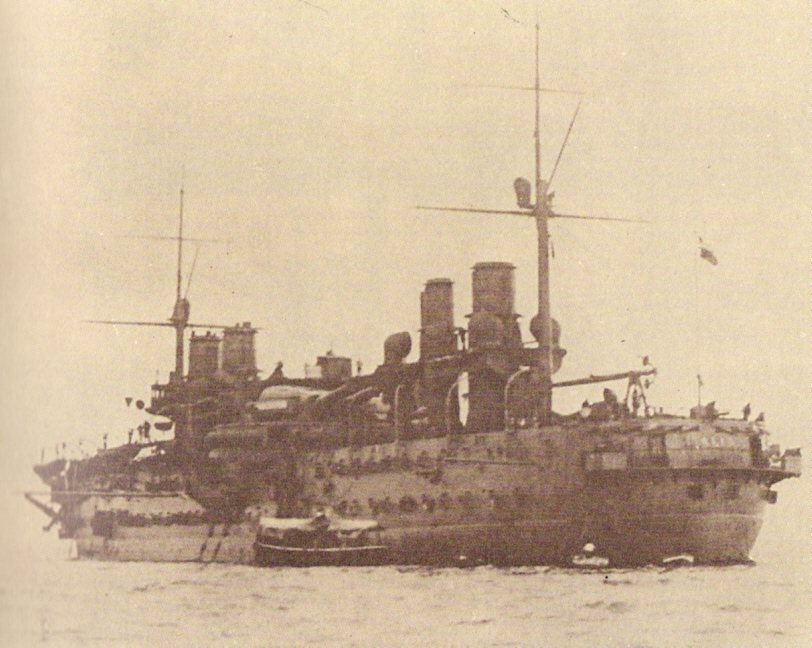
Italia as she appeared after her 1905–1908 refit

In 1905, Italia went into drydock for a major reconstruction that lasted into 1908. Her six funnels were reduced to four, and a second mast was erected. One of her 150 mm guns, six of the 57 mm guns, and eight of the 37 mm revolver cannon were removed. After returning to service in 1909, she served as a torpedo training ship based in La Spezia; she served in this capacity through 1910. The following year, she was also employed as a barracks ship. At the start of the Italo-Turkish War of 1911–1912, Italia was assigned to the 5th Division of the Italian fleet, along with her sister Lepanto and Enrico Dandolo. In December 1911, Italia and Lepanto were prepared to be sent to Tripoli, to replace the three Re Umberto-class ironclads. There, they were to support the Italian garrison that had captured the city. The Italian Navy planned to send the two ships in large part because it had a large stockpile of 432 mm shells, but the plan was never actually carried out.

She was employed as a training ship for petty officers in December 1912, and by 1914 she was stationed in Taranto as a guard ship. Italia was laid up on 1 June 1914 and stricken from the naval register three days later. Despite having all of her secondary guns removed, the ship was towed to Brindisi on 20 April 1915, shortly before Italy entered World War I, to defend the harbor. She was formally returned to the naval register on 23 May, the day Italy declared war on Austria Hungary, and was recommissioned on 1 June as a "first class auxiliary". She remained at Brindisi until 16 December 1917, when she was taken to La Spezia for conversion into a grain carrier, retaining only two of her 119 mm guns. She was transferred initially to the Ministry of Transport on 1 June but was quickly reassigned to the State Railways on 27 July 1919. She remained there briefly, returning to the Navy on 13 January 1921. Italia was finally stricken on 16 November 1921 and subsequently broken up for scrap.
