= Ruggiero di Lauria =

Ruggiero di Lauria may refer to:

- Roger of Lauria (ca. 1245-1305), or Ruggiero di Lauria, Italian admiral
- Italian ironclad Ruggiero di Lauria, an ironclad battleship completed in 1888 and stricken in 1909
- Ruggiero di Lauria-class ironclad
- Italian offshore patrol vessel Ruggiero di Lauria (P435), now KRI Prabu Siliwangi, launched in 2023 and sold to Indonesia in 2024
