= Italia-class ironclad =

Ironclad warship class of the Italian Royal Navy

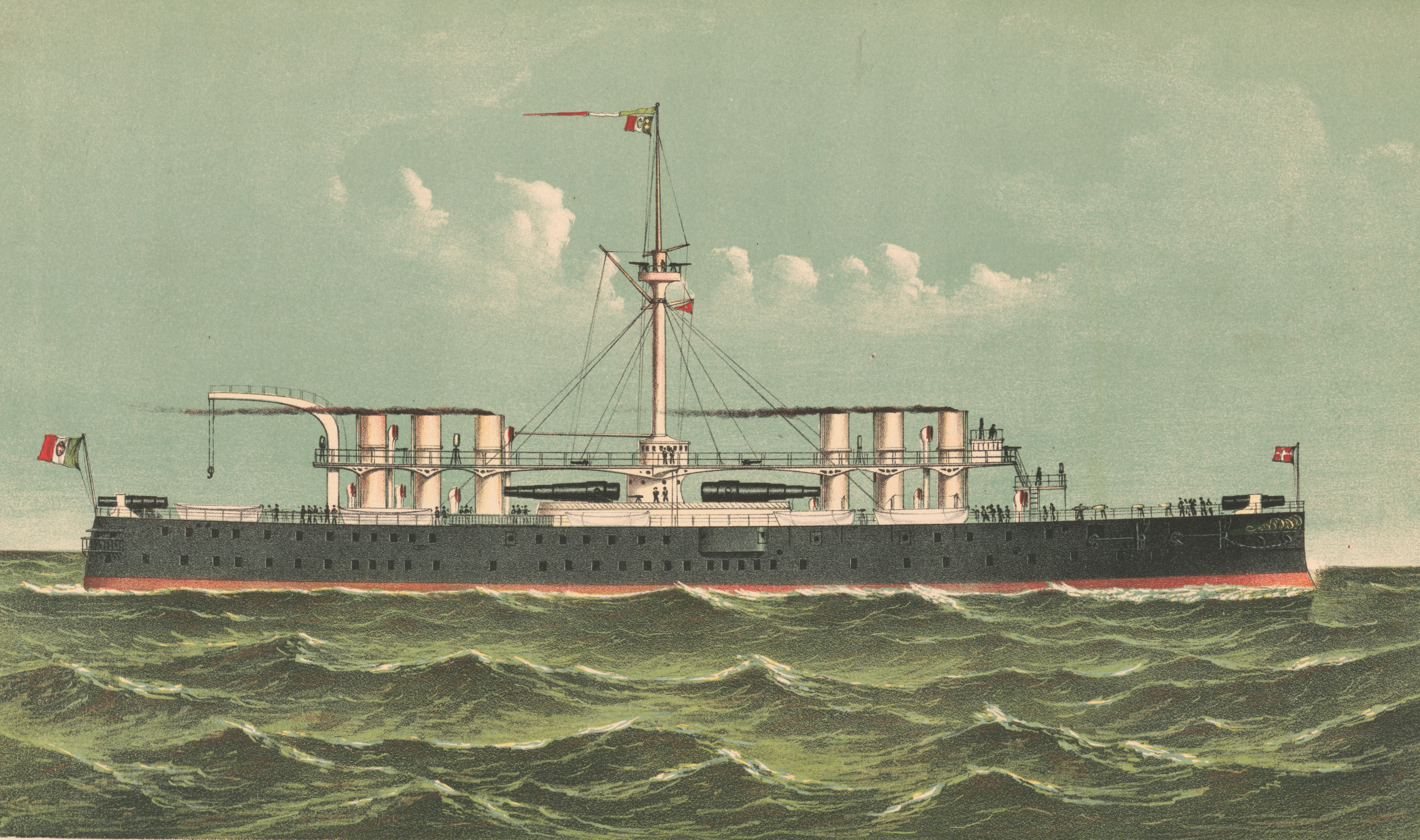
- Illustration of Italia c. 1891

Class overview
- Name: Italia class
- Builders: Cantiere navale fratelli Orlando; R C di Castellammare di Stabia
- Operators: Regia Marina
- Preceded by: Duilio class
- Succeeded by: Ruggiero di Lauria class
- Built: 1876–1887
- In service: 1885–1921
- Completed: 2
- Retired: 2

General characteristics
- Type: Ironclad battleship
- Displacement: Normal: 13,678 long tons (13,897 t); Full load: 15,407 long tons (15,654 t)
- Length: 124.7 m (409 ft 1 in) length overall
- Beam: 22.54 m (74 ft)
- Draft: 8.75 m (28 ft 8 in)
- Installed power: 15,907 ihp (11,862 kW); 26 fire-tube boilers
- Propulsion: 4 × compound steam engines; 4 × screw propellers
- Speed: 17.5 knots (32.4 km/h; 20.1 mph)
- Range: 5,000 nautical miles (9,260 km) at 10 knots (19 km/h; 12 mph)
- Complement: 37 officers; 719 enlisted men
- Armament: 4 × 432 mm (17 in) guns; 8 × 149 mm (5.9 in) guns; 4 × 120 mm (4.7 in) guns; 4 × 356 mm (14 in) torpedo tubes
- Armor: Deck: 76 to 102 mm (3 to 4 in); Barbette: 480 mm (19 in); Conning tower: 300 mm (11.8 in)

The Italia class was a class of two ironclad battleships built for the Italian Regia Marina (Royal Navy) in the 1870s and 1880s. The two ships—Italia and Lepanto—were designed by Benedetto Brin, who chose to discard traditional belt armor entirely, relying on a combination of very high speed and extensive internal subdivision to protect the ships. This, along with their armament of very large 432 mm (17 in) guns, has led some naval historians to refer to the Italia class as prototypical battlecruisers.

Despite serving for over thirty years, the ships had uneventful careers. They spent their first two decades in service with the Active and Reserve Squadrons, where they were primarily occupied with training maneuvers. Lepanto was converted into a training ship in 1902 and Italia was significantly modernized in 1905–1908 before also becoming a training ship. They briefly saw action during the Italo-Turkish War, where they provided gunfire support to Italian troops defending Tripoli. Lepanto was discarded in early 1915, though Italia continued on as a guard ship during World War I, eventually being converted into a grain transport. She was ultimately broken up for scrap in 1921.

== Design ==
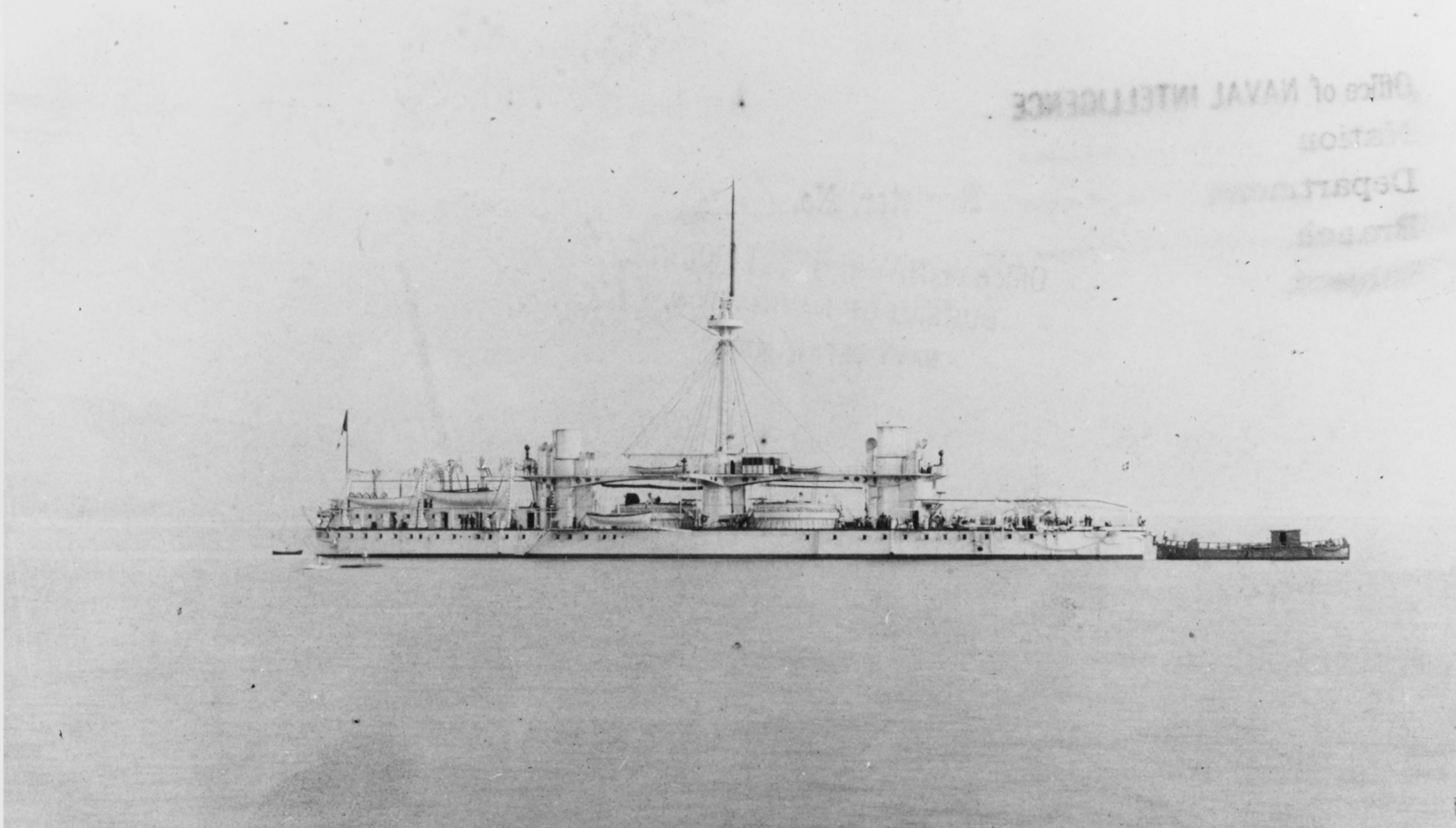
Enrico Dandolo of the Duilio class, which provided the basis for the Italia design

Starting in the 1870s, following the Italian fleet's defeat at the Battle of Lissa, the Italians began a large naval expansion program, at first aimed at countering the Austro-Hungarian Navy. The Italias were the second class of the program, which also included the Duilio class, designed in the early-1870s by Insp Eng Benedetto Brin. The Italia class was ordered by Admiral Simone Antonio Saint-Bon, the Italian naval minister, who envisioned an improved version of the Duilio class that also had the ability to carry large numbers of soldiers, as the Navy had been given the responsibility of defending Italy's lengthy coastline.

Brin prepared the initial design in 1875. The need to keep the size of the ships under control, coupled with developments in armor-piercing shell technology, forced him to make significant alterations compared to the Duilio design to incorporate Saint Bon's requirements. It had come to be realized by naval designers in Italy and abroad that armor plate could no longer effectively resist the latest shell designs, so Brin reasoned that the great weight of an armor belt was unwarranted. Armor plate also tended to fragment when struck by shells, creating damage beyond that caused by the projectile itself, further militating against its use. Additionally, fitting belt armor on a ship the size of Italia would cause a prohibitive increase in displacement, and so he discarded it completely in favor of a thin armored deck, unlike foreign capital ship designs.

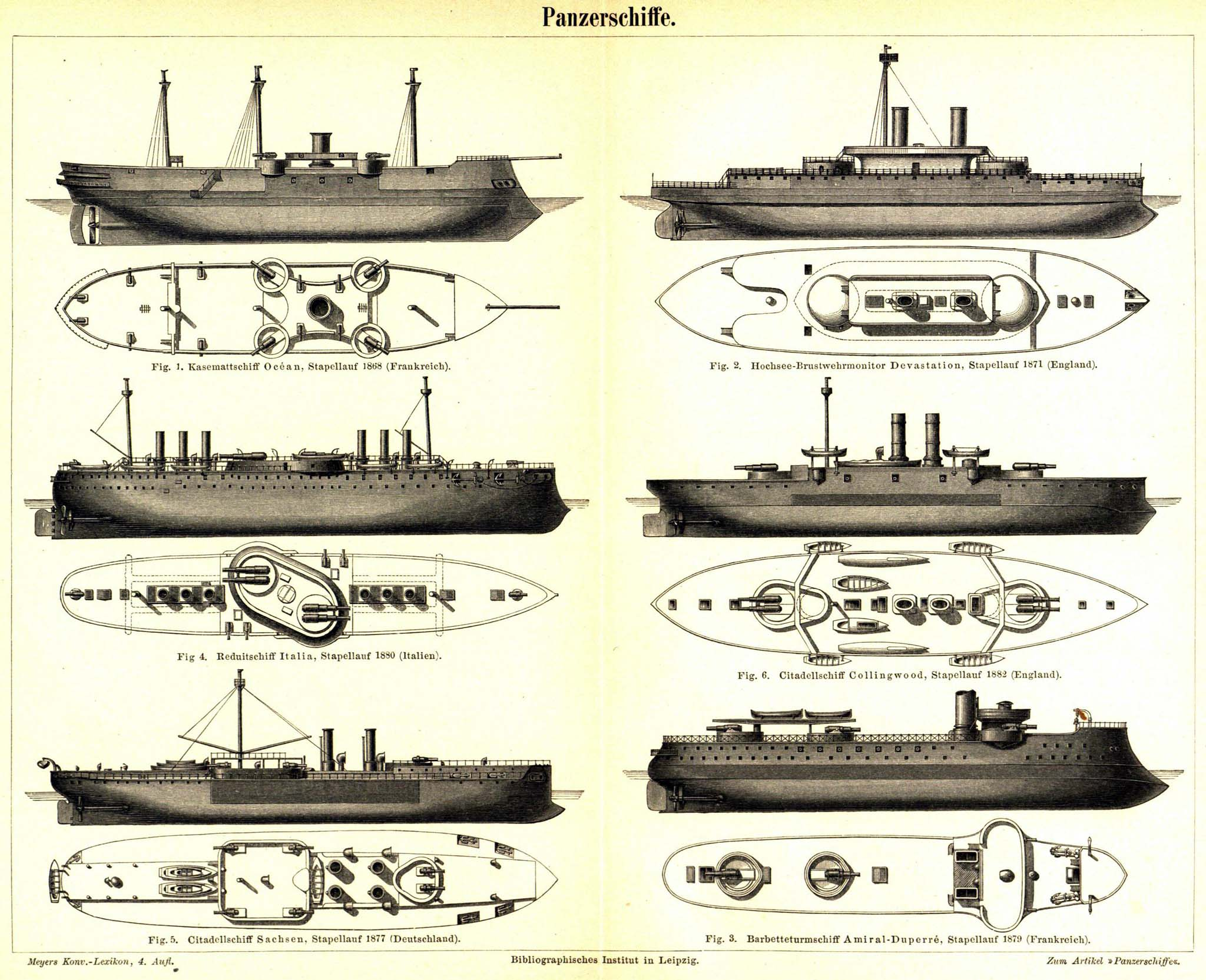
Illustration comparing several European ironclads built in the 1870s, including Italia (center left), though not to scale

Brin originally planned for the ships to displace 13,850 long tons (14,070 t), to have a main battery of two 450 mm (17.7 in) guns in individual barbettes, a secondary armament of eighteen 149 mm (5.9 in) guns, and to carry 3,000 long tons (3,000 t) of coal for increased range over that of the Duilio class. Brin opted to use open barbettes over the heavy, enclosed gun turrets of the Duilios to save weight, which permitted the addition of a full upper deck. This, in turn, provided the space to carry a division of 10,000 soldiers according to Saint Bon's requirements.

As the design evolved, developments in related technologies prompted changes to Brin's design. The development of slow-burning propellants led General Rosset, an artillerist in the Italian Army, suggested that slightly smaller, 432 mm (17 in) guns could be built with longer barrels for the same weight as the 450 mm guns. The longer barrels could take advantage of the slow-burning propellant to increase muzzle velocity, giving the guns better penetrating power. After the original guns were bought by Britain during a war scare with the Russian Empire in 1878, Brin altered the design to incorporate Rosset's ideas. The single 450 mm guns were replaced with pairs of 432 mm guns. By that time, he had made other changes, including reducing the 149 mm armament to eight weapons, and the coal capacity to 1,700 long tons (1,700 t), on 15,000 long tons (15,241 t) displacement. The number of 149 mm guns was reduced because it was found that the additional guns could not have been manned when the 432 mm guns were in use.

The ships were authorized in 1875, with funding allocated to begin construction the following year, though design work continued even after they had been laid down in 1876. They were faster and more seaworthy than the preceding Duilio class, owing to their higher freeboard. They were very large and fast warships for their time, displacing over 15,000 tons at full load; Italia could make 17.8 knots (33.0 km/h), while Lepanto could achieve 18.4 knots (34.1 km/h). Other ironclads of the era could not make more than 15 knots (28 km/h). Their high speed, powerful main battery, and thin armor protection has led to some naval historians to characterize the ships as proto-battlecruisers. Designed at a time when the primary threat to capital ships was a slow-firing gun equipped with cast iron shot, the Italias had the poor luck to enter service after quick-firing guns with explosive shells had been developed, rendering their protection scheme useless.

=== General characteristics ===
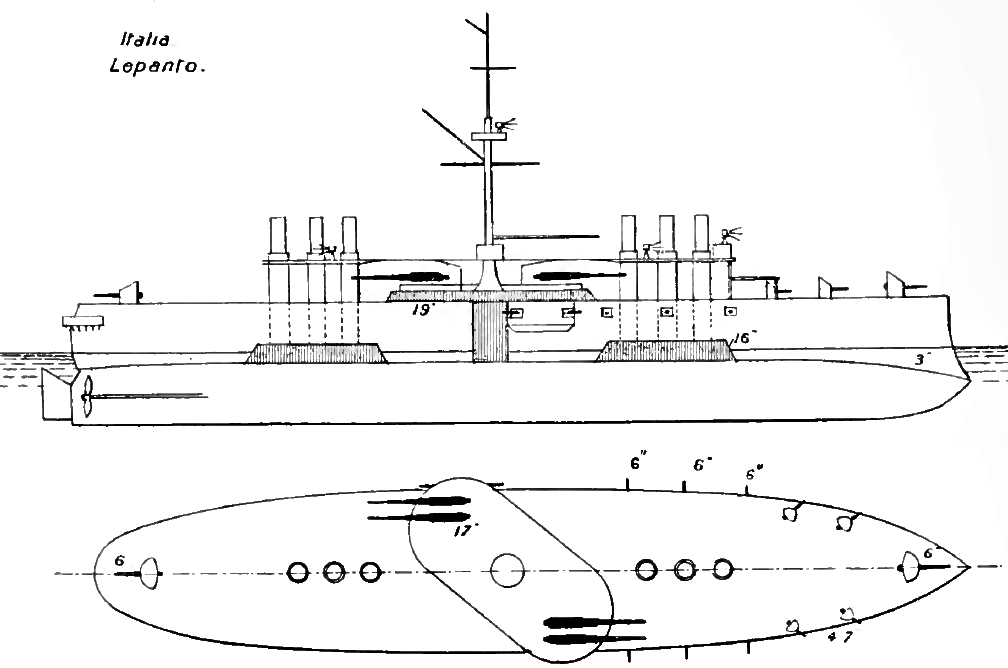
Plan and profile drawing of the Italia class

The ships of the Italia class were 122 meters (400 ft 3 in) long between perpendiculars and 124.7 m (409 ft 1 in) long overall. Italia had a beam of 22.54 m (73 ft 11 in), while Lepanto was slightly narrower, at 22.34 m (73 ft 4 in). The ships had a draft of 8.75 m (28 ft 8 in) and 9.39 m (30 ft 10 in), respectively. Italia displaced 13,678 long tons (13,897 t) normally and up to 15,407 long tons (15,654 t) at full load, while Lepanto displaced 13,336 long tons (13,550 t) normally and 15,649 long tons (15,900 t) fully laden. The ships' great size allowed the designers to use very fine hull lines, which gave them high hydrodynamic efficiency and contributed to their speed.

Both ships' hulls had a ram bow and were constructed of steel, which offered a significant weight savings of 15 percent compared to iron hulls. Below the waterline, Italia's hull was sheathed in wood and zinc to prevent biofouling, but Lepanto was not similarly fitted. They had a double bottom that extended for 77.55 m (254.4 ft), a distance that spanned the propulsion machinery rooms and the ammunition magazines. The hulls were divided into sixty-nine watertight compartments below the armor deck and another eighty-four in the double bottom. Steering was controlled by a single rudder, which was steam operated aboard Italia and hydraulically driven aboard Lepanto.

The Italia-class vessels had a minimal superstructure. Both were fitted with a single military mast with fighting tops placed directly amidships; a small hurricane deck connected the ships' funnels and the mast. The deck was placed highly enough to allow the main battery guns to fully traverse, even with their barrels at maximum elevation. Atop the deck, a small bridge was placed. Italia had a crew of 37 officers and 719 enlisted men, while Lepanto had the same number of officers and 656 enlisted men. The ships had 25 feet (7.6 m) of freeboard. They each carried a number of small boats, including two second-class torpedo boats aboard Italia and three picket boats aboard Lepanto.

=== Propulsion machinery ===
Their propulsion system consisted of four compound steam engines each driving a single screw propeller, which were 20 ft 6 in (6.25 m) in diameter. The engines could be run either in compound mode for greater fuel efficiency or in direct-acting mode for higher speed. Steam was supplied by twenty-six coal-fired, oval fire-tube boilers aboard Italia, while Lepanto received eight of the oval boilers and sixteen locomotive boilers. The ships' engine rooms were placed amidships, each engine in its own watertight compartment, with three boiler rooms on either end the engines. Italia's boilers were trunked into six funnels, placed in two sets of three all on the centerline. Lepanto only had four funnels in two pairs; during Italia's refit in 1905–1908, her funnels were reduced to an identical arrangement.

The ships' propulsion system was projected to produce 18,000 indicated horsepower (13,000 kW) using forced draft to reach the intended top speed of 18 knots (33 km/h; 21 mph). On her initial speed trials, Italia's engines produced a top speed of 17.5 knots (32.4 km/h; 20.1 mph) from a maximum of 15,907 ihp (11,862 kW), and she could maintain this speed for about an hour. Lepanto was faster, with a top speed of 18.38 knots (34.04 km/h; 21.15 mph) from 16,150 ihp (12,040 kW). The ships had a coal storage capacity of 3,000 long tons (3,000 t), though in practice likely carried 1,550 long tons (1,570 t). Figures for the ships' cruising radius vary; Conway's All the World's Fighting Ships reports that they could steam for 5,000 nautical miles (9,300 km; 5,800 mi) at a speed of 10 knots (19 km/h; 12 mph), while the historian Sergie Vinogradov states that they had a range of 8,700 nmi (16,100 km; 10,000 mi) at the same speed.

=== Armament ===
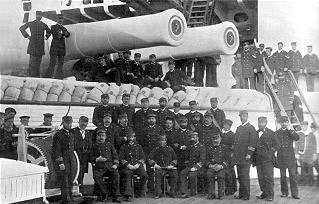
Admiral Felice Napoleone Canevaro and the officers of Italia pose under a pair of her 17-inch (432-mm) guns.

Italia and Lepanto each carried a main armament of four 432 mm (17 in) breech-loading guns. Italia received three 26-caliber guns and one 27-caliber gun, while Lepanto was equipped entirely with 27-caliber guns. The former guns were the A model, and they fired a 2,000-pound (910 kg) shell at a muzzle velocity of around 1,811 feet per second (552 m/s), significantly better than the older 432 mm guns' 1,550 ft/s (470 m/s) for the same weight shell. The longer 27-caliber weapons produced an even higher velocity of 1,903 ft/s (580 m/s); armor penetration at the muzzle was 960 mm (37.6 in) and 1,000 mm (39.4 in) of wrought iron, respectively. Both caliber guns' rate of fire was very slow, taking eight minutes to reload after each shot, though they were still faster than the muzzle-loading 432 mm guns.

The guns were mounted in pairs en echelon amidships in a single, large, diagonal, oval barbette, with one pair of guns on a turntable to port and the other to starboard. The port pair was mounted aft of the starboard pair. The magazine was below the armored deck, and ammunition was brought up to the main guns via an armored trunk. They had to be returned to a fixed loading position after every shot: the forward guns pointed 45 degrees off the bow while the aft guns were 45 degrees from the stern. Records of ammunition storage vary; contemporary British sources report that Italia carried forty-five shells per gun and Lepanto was fitted with forty, while a Russian source reports fifty shells per gun for both vessels. The ships' high freeboard allowed the main guns to be mounted 33 feet (10 m) above the waterline, and the design and location of the barbette and turntables gave the guns good fields of fire. Their elevation ranged from −10 degrees to +15, which allowed them to engage targets as close as 55 m (180 ft).

The ships carried a secondary battery of eight medium caliber guns in single pivot mounts. Italia carried the originally-intended 149 mm 26.7-caliber guns, while Lepanto received newer 152 mm (6 in) 32-caliber guns. These guns were distributed along the length of the ships; one was on the upper deck forward as a bow-chaser, four were on the broadside forward of the main battery, another pair were astern of the main guns, and the eighth gun was on the upper deck as a stern-chaser. These were supported by a battery of four 120 mm (4.7 in) guns, also in single mounts. The ships also carried a pair of 75 mm (3 in) mountain guns and two machine guns for use by landing parties ashore. As was customary for capital ships of the period, they carried four 356 mm (14 in) torpedo tubes. These were placed on the broadside above the waterline. The torpedoes carried a 125 kg (276 lb) warhead and had a range of 600 m (2,000 ft).

=== Armor ===
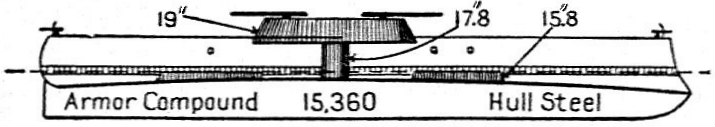
Sketch of the armor layout aboard Italia

Instead of belt armor the ships were protected by a mild steel armored deck, the details of which are unclear. Vinogradov notes that contemporary sources report a range of thicknesses from 3 to 4.7 in. He suggests that the most likely explanation is that the ships were not identical. British intelligence reports credit Italia with a deck thickness of 102 mm (4 in) in the central portion of the ship and reduced to 3 in at the bow and stern. The same reports state that Lepanto had a uniform 3 in deck. The armored deck sloped downward to meet the ships' sides at a point 6 feet (1.8 m) below the waterline and combined with two bulkheads that ran the entire length of the ships, set back several feet from the side, and numerous other bulkheads interspersed among the two main bulkheads to create a hull extensively divided into watertight compartments. The resulting "cellular raft" of small compartments was designed to detonate shells before they could penetrate very far into the ships; confining the resulting explosion and flooding to limited areas, dampening and containing the effect.

For rest of the ship's protection, recently developed compound armor was selected for Italia, which was manufactured by the British firms Cammell Laird and John Brown & Company. Lepanto received an improved steel that had been developed by the French company Schneider-Creusot. The ships' conning tower was armored with 300 mm (11.8 in) of plate on the sides. The barbettes had 480 mm (19 in) on the sides to protect the guns, back with a layer of teak that was 521 mm (20.5 in) thick. The tops of the barbettes had two layers of 15 mm (0.59 in) to protect the gun crews from small arms fire from enemy fighting tops. Each ship had armored tubes connecting the barbettes to the magazines below; these had 400 mm (15.7 in) thick sides. The bases of the funnels, where the boiler uptakes connected to them, also received 15.7 in of armor.

=== Modifications ===
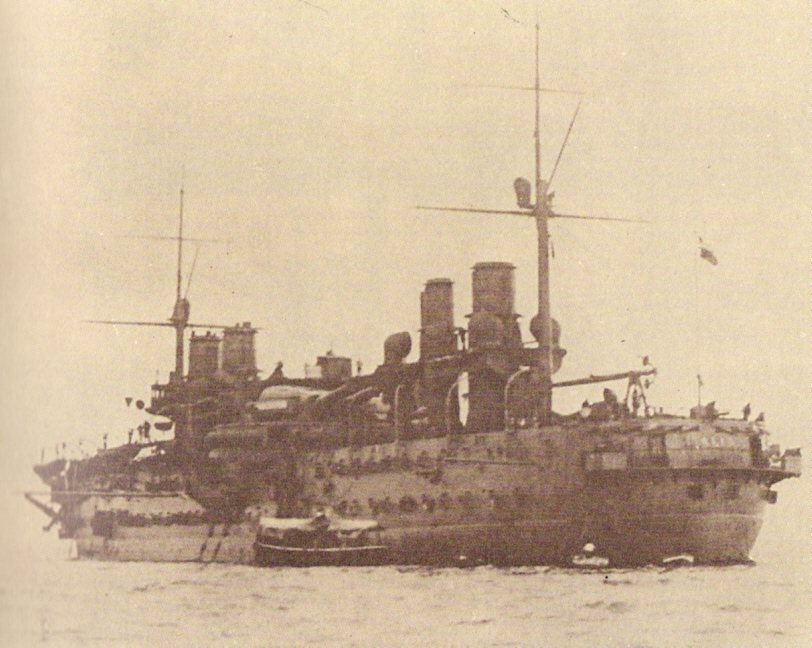
Italia as she appeared after her 1905–1908 refit

Their secondary batteries were revised over the course of their careers. During a refit in the late 1890s, the ships were given a tertiary battery for close-range defense against torpedo boats. Each ship received twelve 57 mm (2.24 in) Hotchkiss guns and twelve 37 mm (1.5 in) Hotchkiss guns in individual mounts. In another refit completed by 1908, Italia had her 150 mm guns replaced with seven 152 mm weapons, and her anti-torpedo boat armament was reduced to six 57 mm guns and two 37 mm guns. The historian Sergei Vinogradov notes that some sources report that two additional torpedo tubes were fitted to Italia at this time, but states that "this seems unlikely." The refit also saw the removal of the central military mast and the installation of two light pole masts.

By 1911, Lepanto had had a second refit as well, which removed all of her 152 mm guns and torpedo tubes and reduced her tertiary battery to nine 57 mm and six 37 mm guns. While serving as a floating battery at Brindisi during World War I, Italia had all of her secondary and tertiary guns removed, and in 1918, when she was converted into a grain transport vessel, her main battery was removed as well, though she received two 120 mm 32-caliber guns for defense.

== Construction ==
Construction data
Name	Builder	Laid down	Launched	Completed
Italia	Regio Cantiere di Castellammare di Stabia	3 January 1876	29 September 1880	16 October 1885
Lepanto	Cantiere navale fratelli Orlando	4 November 1876	17 March 1883	16 August 1887

== Service history ==
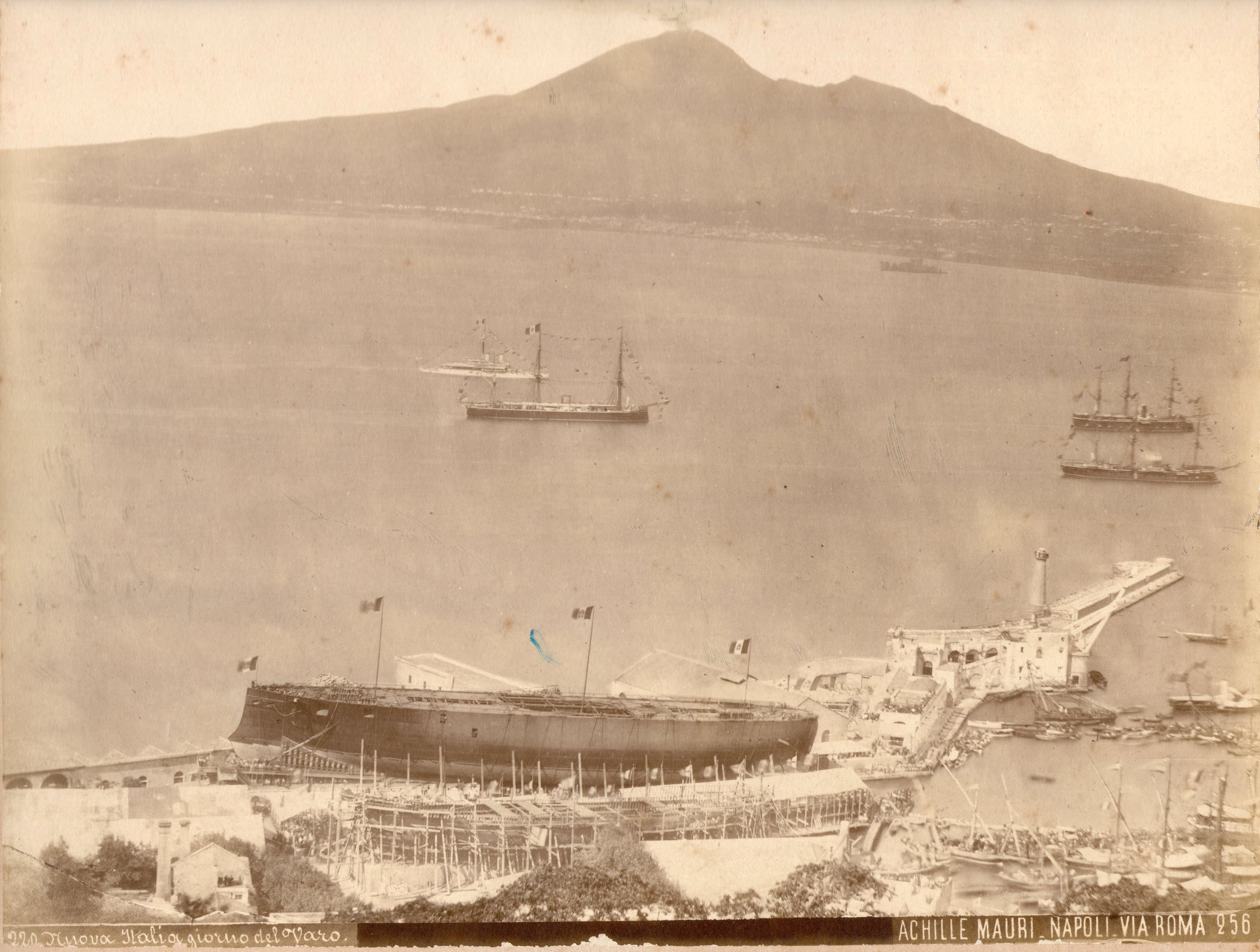
Italia at her launching

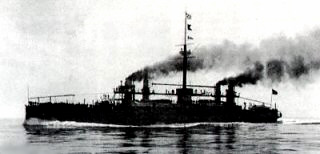
Lepanto in the Mediterranean Sea in the late 1880s

Italia and Lepanto spent the first decade of their careers alternative between the Active and Reserve Squadrons of the Italian fleet. Italia served as the flagship of the Active Squadron after entering service in 1886 but was reduced to the reserve the following year. She resumed flagship duties in early 1888, and was joined in the unit by Lepanto later that year. Italia was again laid up in late 1890 and Lepanto was similarly deactivated the next year. Over the following five years, both ships alternated between active and reserve status. During their active careers, they were primarily occupied with training exercises. As Italy was a member of the Triple Alliance at the time, the simulated opponent in these maneuvers was typically France; during the 1893 annual fleet maneuvers, both ships served in the squadron simulating an attack on the Italian coast.

In 1896, both ships began to serve in auxiliary roles, Italia as a gunnery training ship and Lepanto as a training vessel for signalmen and helmsmen. The following year, in June 1897, Lepanto steamed to Britain to represent Italy at the Fleet Review for Queen Victoria's Diamond Jubilee. The ships continued to alternate between the squadrons for the rest of the decade, with 1897 and 1898 in the Reserve, and 1899 in the Active Squadron. During this period, the Italian Navy considered rebuilding the ships along the same lines as the ironclad Enrico Dandolo, but the project proved to be too costly, and by 1902 the plan was abandoned.

Lepanto was removed from front-line service in 1902 and converted into a gunnery training ship; to aid in this task, the ship received a variety of light weapons that trainees would go on to use in the fleet. During this period, she also took part in annual training exercises with the rest of the fleet. In October 1910, she was reduced to a barracks ship. Italia was modernized in 1905–1908, losing two of her funnels and several of her small-caliber guns; from 1909 to 1910, she served as a torpedo training ship. She was then used as a barracks ship in 1911. Both ships were reactivated in September 1911 after the outbreak of the Italo-Turkish War, initially assigned to the 5th Division. After the capture of Tripoli in October, Italia and Lepanto were intended to be sent to the city to provide gunfire support for the soldiers defending it, but the plan came to nothing and they remained in Italy.

Lepanto was stricken from the naval register on 26 May 1912, but she was reinstated on 13 January 1913 as an auxiliary. Italia, meanwhile, had been reduced again to training duties in December 1912, this time for non-commissioned officers and engine room personnel. Lepanto did not remain in service long, being stricken again on 1 January 1914 and being sold to ship breakers on 27 March 1915. Italia was stricken from the register on 4 June 1914, but was not discarded before the start of World War I the following month. In April 1915, as Italy prepared to enter the conflict on the side of the Triple Entente, Italia was towed to Brindisi to be used as a guard ship, and she was restored to the naval register on 23 May. In December 1917, she was taken to La Spezia, where she was converted into a grain carrier, serving briefly with the Ministry of Transport in June 1919 before being transferred to the State Railways in July. The ship returned to the Navy in January 1921, but was stricken in November that year and sold for scrap.
