= Italian ironclad Andrea Doria =

Ironclad warship of the Italian Royal Navy

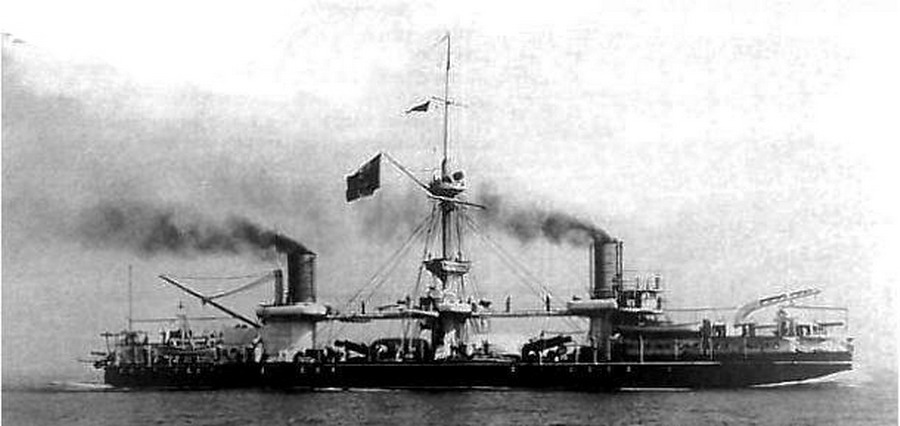
- Andrea Doria on 18 April 1899.

History

Italy
- Name: Andrea Doria
- Namesake: Andrea Doria
- Operator: Regia Marina
- Builder: Arsenale di La Spezia
- Laid down: 7 January 1882
- Launched: 21 November 1885
- Completed: 16 May 1891
- Stricken: 25 May 1911
- Fate: Scrapped 1929

General characteristics
- Class & type: Ruggiero di Lauria-class ironclad
- Displacement: Normal: 9,886 long tons (10,045 t); Full load: 11,027 long tons (11,204 t)
- Length: 105.9 m (347 ft 5 in) length overall
- Beam: 19.84 m (65 ft 1 in)
- Draft: 8.29 to 8.37 m (27 ft 2 in to 27 ft 6 in)
- Installed power: 8 × fire-tube boilers; 10,591 ihp (7,898 kW)
- Propulsion: 2 × marine steam engines; 2 × screw propellers
- Speed: 16.1 knots (29.8 km/h; 18.5 mph)
- Range: 2,800 nmi (5,186 km) at 10 knots (19 km/h; 12 mph)
- Complement: 507–509
- Armament: 4 × 432 mm (17 in)/27 guns; 2 × 152 mm (6 in) guns; 4 × 120 mm (5 in) guns; 4 × 356 mm (14 in) torpedo tubes
- Armor: Belt: 451 mm (17.75 in); Deck: 76 mm (3 in); Barbettes: 361 mm (14.2 in); Conning tower: 249 mm (9.8 in)

Andrea Doria was an ironclad battleship built for the Italian Regia Marina (Royal Navy) in the 1880s and 1890s. Named for the 16th-century Genoese admiral Andrea Doria, she was the third and final ship of the Ruggiero di Lauria class. The ship was armed with a main battery of four 432 mm (17 in) guns, was protected with 451 mm (17.75 in) thick belt armor, and was capable of a top speed of 17 knots (31 km/h; 20 mph).

The ship's construction period was very lengthy, beginning in August 1881 and completing in February 1888. She was quickly rendered obsolescent by the new pre-dreadnought battleships being laid down, and as a result, her career was limited. She spent her career alternating between the Active and Reserve Squadrons, where she took part in training exercises each year with the rest of the fleet. Andrea Doria was stricken from the naval register in 1911 and used as a depot ship until Italy entered World War I in 1915. The ship was renamed GR 104 and employed as a guard ship in Brindisi. She was converted into a floating oil tank after the war and was eventually broken up for scrap in 1929.

== Design ==
Line-drawing of the Ruggiero di Lauria class

In the early 1870s, the Italian Regia Marina (Royal Navy) began a construction program to counter the Austro-Hungarian Navy that had defeated it at the Battle of Lissa in 1866. The program consisted of several very large turret ships, beginning with the Duilio-class ironclads, which provided the basis for the Ruggiero di Lauria class, though the new ships incorporated several advancements, including improved guns and more effective compound armor.

Andrea Doria was 105.9 meters (347 ft 5 in) long overall and had a beam of 19.84 m (65 ft 1 in) and an average draft of 8.29 m (27 ft 2 in). She displaced 9,886 long tons (10,045 t) normally and up to 11,027 long tons (11,204 t) at full load. The ship had a short forecastle, connected by a hurricane deck to a raised sterncastle. Her superstructure included a small conning tower with a bridge on the forecastle. The ship was fitted with a single, heavy military mast placed amidships. She had a crew of 507–509 officers and men.

Her propulsion system consisted of a pair of compound marine steam engines each driving a single screw propeller. Steam was supplied by eight coal-fired, cylindrical fire-tube boilers that were vented through a pair of widely spaced funnels at the ends of the hurricane deck. Her engines produced a top speed of 16.1 knots (29.8 km/h; 18.5 mph) at 10,500 indicated horsepower (7,800 kW). She could steam for 2,800 nautical miles (5,200 km; 3,200 mi) at a speed of 10 knots (19 km/h; 12 mph).

Andrea Doria was armed with a main battery of four 432 mm (17 in) 27-caliber guns, mounted in two pairs en echelon in a central barbette. She carried a secondary battery of two 152 mm (6 in) 32-cal. guns, one at the bow and the other at the stern, and four 120 mm (5 in) 32-cal. guns; two of these were placed side by side behind the bow 152 mm gun, and the other two were mounted side by side on the aft superstructure. As was customary for capital ships of the period, she carried five 356 mm (14 in) torpedo tubes submerged in the hull.

She was protected by steel armor; her belt armor was 451 mm (17.75 in) thick, and her armored deck was 76 mm (3 in) thick. The deck sloped downward at the sides to provide additional protection against incoming fire. Her conning tower was armored with 249 mm (9.8 in) of steel plate on the sides. The barbette had 361 mm (14.2 in) of steel armor.

== Service history ==
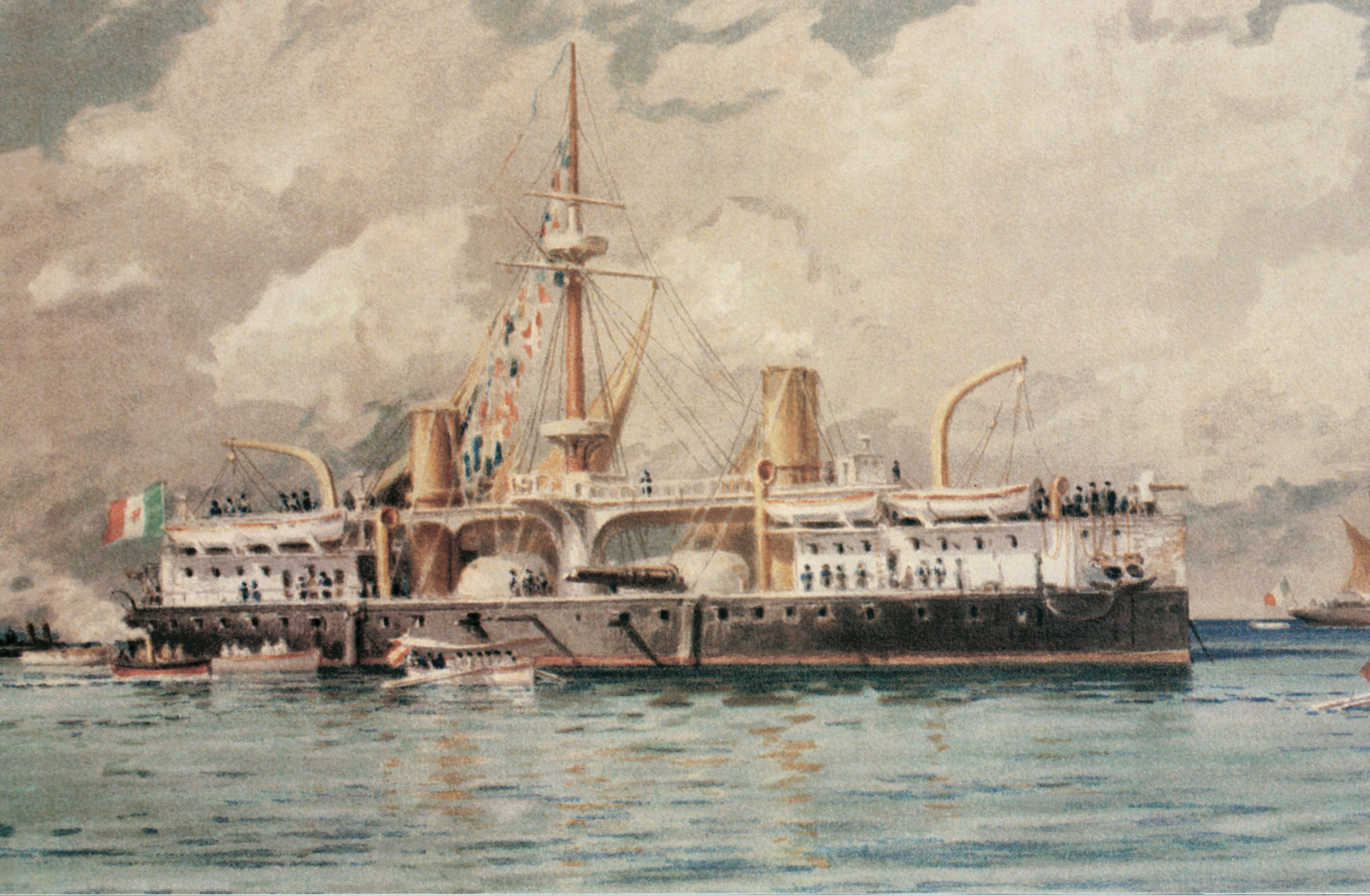
A painting of Ruggiero di Lauria, sister ship to Andrea Doria

Andrea Doria was under construction for nine-and-a-half years. She was laid down at La Spezia Navy Yard on 7 January 1882 and launched on 21 November 1885. She was not completed for another five-and-a-half years, her construction finally being finished on 16 May 1891. Because of the rapid pace of naval technological development in the late 19th century, her lengthy construction period meant that she was an obsolete design by the time she entered service. The British Royal Navy had begun building the Royal Sovereign class, the first pre-dreadnought battleships, two years before Andrea Doria entered service; these ships marked a significant step forward in capital ship design. In addition, technological progress, particularly in armor production techniques—first Harvey armor and then Krupp armor—rapidly rendered older vessels like Andrea Doria obsolete.

Andrea Doria served with the 2nd Division of the Active Squadron during the 1893 fleet maneuvers, along with the ironclad Italia, which served as the divisional flagship, the torpedo cruiser Iride, and four torpedo boats. During the maneuvers, which lasted from 6 August to 5 September, the ships of the Active Squadron simulated a French attack on the Italian fleet. Beginning on 14 October 1894, the Italian fleet, including Lepanto, assembled in Genoa for a naval review held in honor of King Umberto I at the commissioning of the new ironclad Re Umberto. The festivities lasted three days. Andrea Doria joined the ironclads Ruggiero di Lauria, Re Umberto, and Sardegna and the cruisers Stromboli, Etruria, and Partenope for a visit to Spithead in the United Kingdom in July 1895. Later that year, the squadron stopped in Germany for the celebration held to mark the opening of the Kaiser Wilhelm Canal.

In 1896, Andrea Doria served in the 2nd Division for the summer maneuvers, held in July. The Division also included her sister Francesco Morosini and the protected cruiser Giovanni Bausan. The 1st and 2nd Divisions of the Active Squadron were tasked with defending against a hostile fleet, simulated by older ships in reserve. In 1899, Andrea Doria, Ruggiero di Lauria, Sicilia, and Sardegna took part in a naval review in Cagliari for the Italian King Umberto I, which included a French and British squadron as well. That year, Andrea Doria and her two sisters served in the Active Squadron, which was kept in service for eight months of the year, with the remainder spent with reduced crews. The Squadron also included the ironclads Re Umberto, Sicilia, and Lepanto. In 1900, Andrea Doria and her sisters were significantly modified and received a large number of small guns for defense against torpedo boats. These included a pair of 75 mm (3 in) guns, ten 57 mm (2.24 in) 40-caliber guns, twelve 37 mm (1.5 in) guns, five 37 mm revolver cannon, and two machine guns.

In 1905, Ruggiero di Lauria and her two sisters were joined in the Reserve Squadron by the three Re Umberto-class ironclads and Enrico Dandolo, three cruisers, and sixteen torpedo boats. This squadron only entered active service for two months of the year for training maneuvers, and the rest of the year was spent with reduced crews. By 1908, the Italian Navy began to discard its ironclad battleships, including Andrea Doria's two sister ships in 1909. She lingered on in active service only briefly, before she too was stricken on 15 January 1911. She was thereafter used as a depot ship in Taranto. Shortly before Italy entered World War I on the side of the Triple Entente, Andrea Doria was renamed GR 104—a new dreadnought battleship of the same name had just been completed—and was transferred to Brindisi, where she served as a guard ship. Following the end of the war, she was converted into a floating oil tank; she served in this capacity until 1929, when she was broken up for scrap.
