= Italian ironclad Enrico Dandolo =

Ironclad warship of the Italian Royal Navy

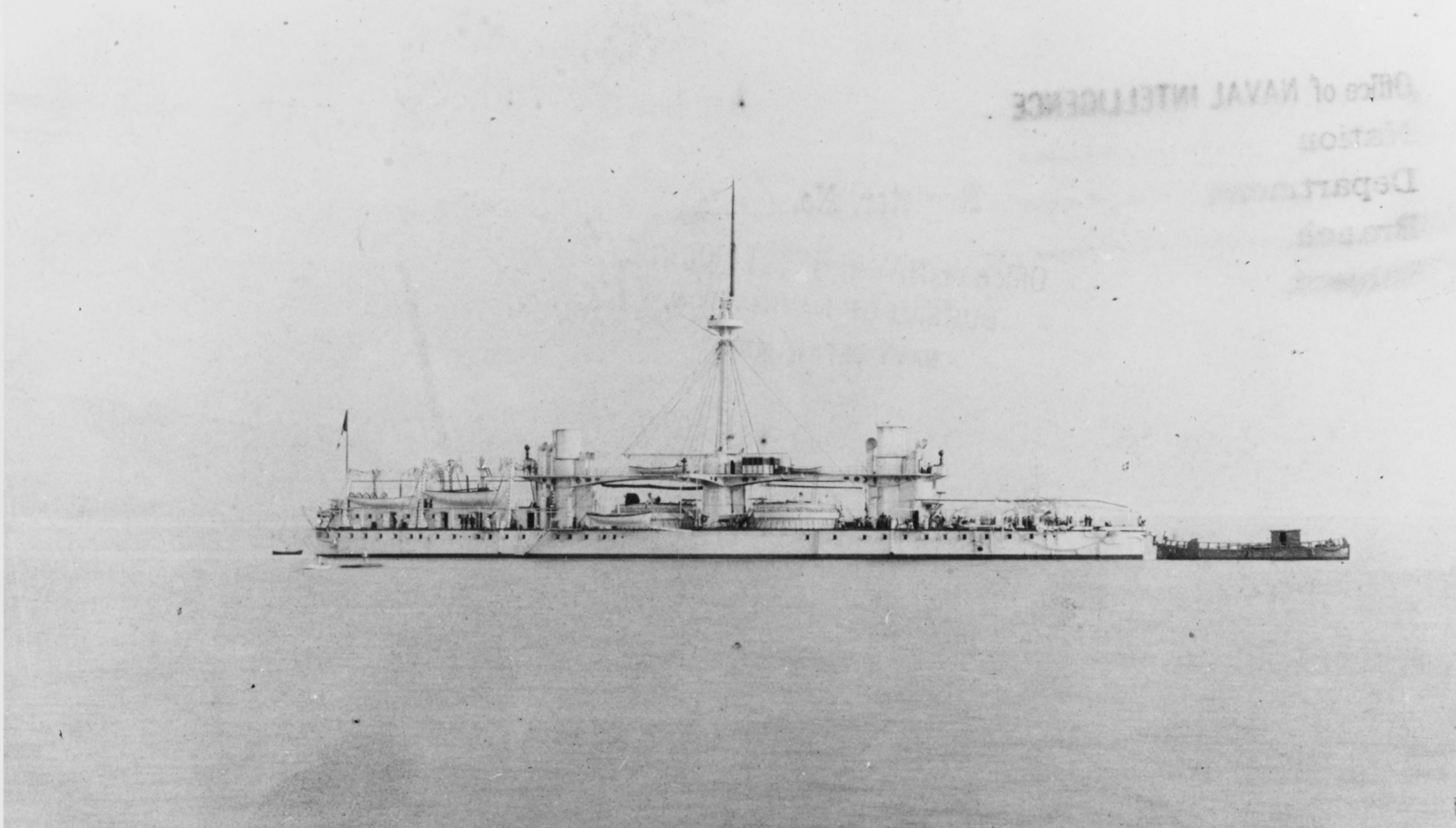
- Enrico Dandolo shortly after her completion in 1882

History

Italy
- Name: Enrico Dandolo
- Namesake: Enrico Dandolo
- Laid down: 6 January 1873
- Launched: 10 July 1878
- Completed: 11 April 1882
- Commissioned: 1882
- Decommissioned: 4 July 1920

General characteristics
- Class & type: Duilio-class ironclad
- Displacement: Normal: 11,025 long tons (11,202 t); Full load: 12,037 long tons (12,230 t)
- Length: 109.16 m (358 ft 2 in)
- Beam: 19.65 m (64 ft 6 in)
- Draft: 8.36 m (27 ft 5 in)
- Installed power: 8 × fire-tube boilers; 8,045 ihp (5,999 kW)
- Propulsion: 2 × marine steam engines; 2 × screw propellers
- Speed: 15 knots (28 km/h; 17 mph)
- Range: 3,760 nmi (6,960 km; 4,330 mi) at 10 knots (19 km/h; 12 mph)
- Complement: 420
- Armament: 4 × 450 mm (17.7 in) guns; 3 × 356 mm (14 in) torpedo tubes
- Armor: Belt: 546 mm (21.5 in); Turrets: 432 mm (17 in); Deck: 30 to 51 mm (1.2 to 2 in)

Enrico Dandolo was the second of two Duilio-class ironclad turret ships built for the Italian Regia Marina (Royal Navy) in the 1870s. They were fitted with the largest guns available, 450 mm (18 in) rifled, muzzle-loading guns, and were the largest, fastest and most powerful ships of their day. Enrico Dandolo was built in La Spezia, with her keel laid in January 1873 and her hull launched in July 1878. Construction was finally completed in April 1882 when the ship, named for the 41st Doge of Venice, was commissioned into the Italian fleet.

Enrico Dandolo spent much of her career in the Active Squadron of the Italian fleet, primarily occupied with training exercises. She was heavily modernized in 1895–1898, receiving a new battery of fast-firing 254 mm (10 in) guns in place of the old 17.72 in guns. The ship served in the Reserve Squadron after 1905, and then became a gunnery training ship. During the Italo-Turkish War of 1911–1912, Enrico Dandolo was among the few ships of the Italian fleet to see no action. She was employed as a harbor defense ship, first in Tobruk, Libya in 1913 and then in Brindisi and Venice during World War I. The ship was ultimately broken up for scrap in 1920.

== Design ==
The Duilio-class ironclads were designed by the noted Italian naval architect Benedetto Brin; they were revolutionary warships at the time they were designed, being the first ironclad battleships to be built without a sailing rig, and they marked the beginning of a trend toward larger and larger guns. Brin originally intended a main battery of four 35-long-ton (36 t) guns in a pair of turrets placed centrally, but during the course of work on the ships, he increased the size to 65 long tons (66 t) and ultimately to 100 long tons (100 t).

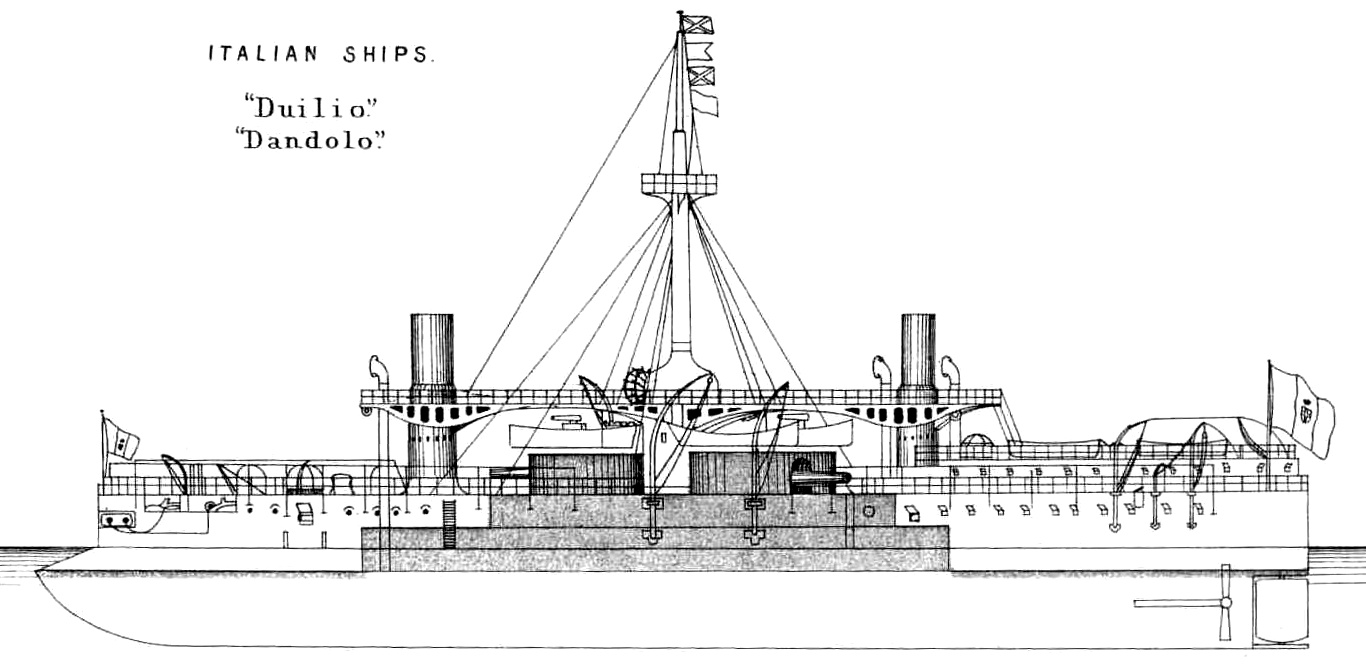
Line-drawing of the Duilio class

Enrico Dandolo was 109.16 meters (358 ft 2 in) long overall and had a beam of 19.65 m (64 ft 6 in) and an average draft of 8.36 m (27 ft 5 in). She displaced 11,025 long tons (11,202 t) normally and up to 12,037 long tons (12,230 t) at full load. The ship's hull featured a straight stem and stern, along with a pronounced ram bow below the waterline. Enrico Dandolo had a minimal superstructure, which included a small conning tower that was connected via a hurricane deck to a heavy military mast located amidships and another small platform further aft. She had a crew of 420 officers and men, which later increased to 515.

Her propulsion system consisted of two vertical compound steam engines each driving a single screw propeller. Steam was supplied by eight coal-fired, rectangular boilers that were divided into two boiler rooms on either end of the ship's central battery, each vented through its own funnel, which were incorporated into the ends of the hurricane deck. Her engines produced a top speed of 15.6 knots (28.9 km/h; 18.0 mph) at 8,045 indicated horsepower (5,999 kW). She could steam for 2,875 nautical miles (5,324 km; 3,308 mi) at a speed of 13 knots (24 km/h; 15 mph).

Enrico Dandolo was armed with a main battery of four 450 mm (17.7 in) 20-caliber guns, mounted in two turrets placed en echelon amidships. This arrangement gave all four guns very wide fields of fire. These were the largest naval guns in use by any country at the time. As was customary for capital ships of the period, she carried three 356 mm (14 in) torpedo tubes.

Enrico Dandolo was protected by belt armor that was 546 mm (21.5 in) thick at its strongest section, which protected the ship's magazines and machinery spaces. Both ends of the belt were connected by transverse bulkheads that were 400 mm (15.75 in) thick. She had an armored deck that was 28 to 51 mm (1.1 to 2 in) thick. Her gun turrets were armored with 432 mm (17 in) of steel plate. The ship's bow and stern were not armored, but they were extensively subdivided into a cellular "raft" that was intended to reduce the risk of flooding.

== Service history ==
=== Construction – 1894 ===
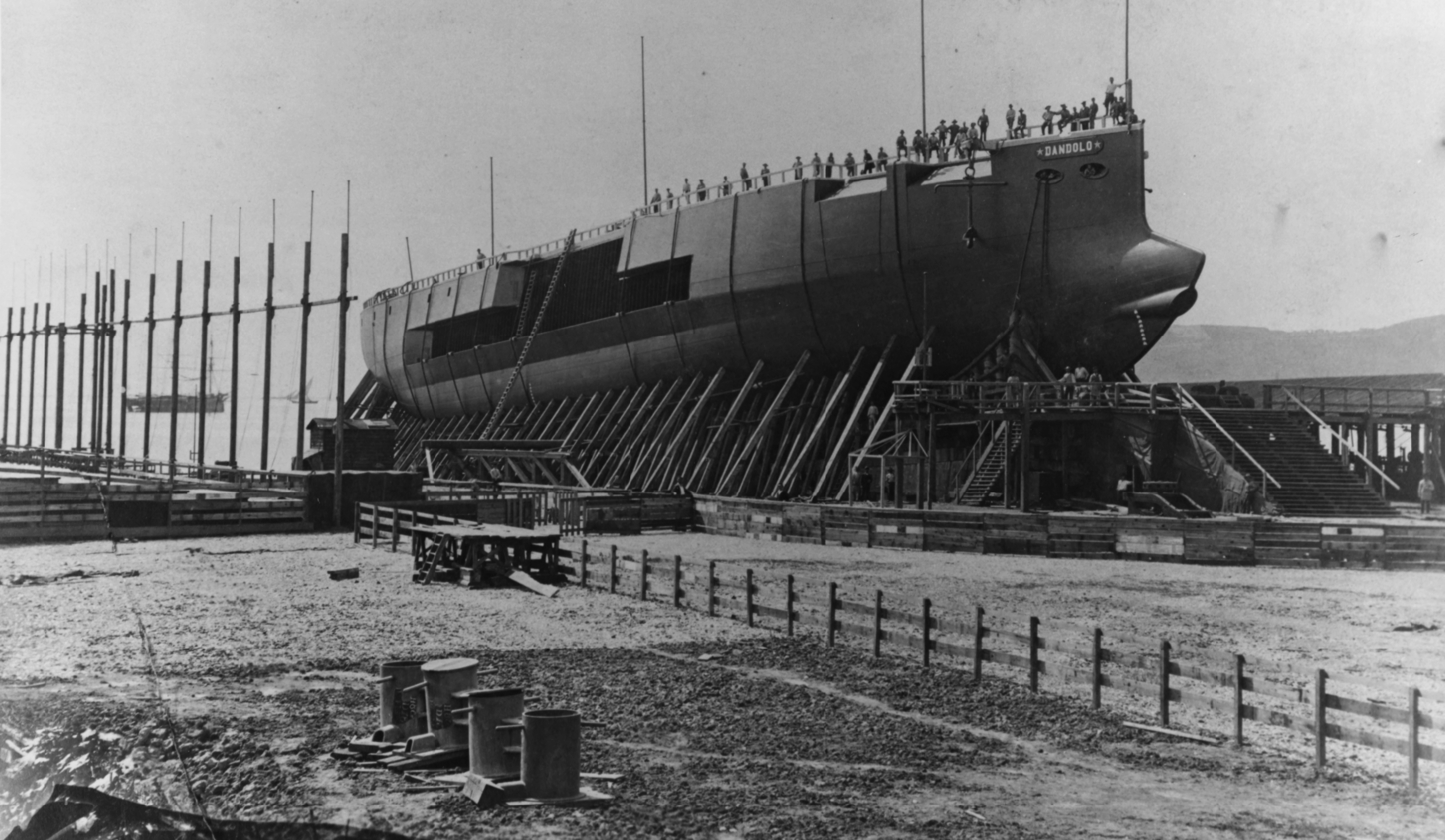
Enrico Dandolo shortly before her launching in 1878

Enrico Dandolo, named after Enrico Dandolo, the 41st Doge of Venice, was laid down at La Spezia on 6 January 1873 and was launched on 10 July 1878. Fitting-out work was completed on 11 April 1882. During the annual fleet maneuvers held in 1885, Enrico Dandolo served as the flagship of the 1st Division of the "Western Squadron", with Vice Admiral Martini commanding. She was joined by her sister Duilio, the protected cruiser Giovanni Bausan, and a sloop. The "Western Squadron" attacked the defending "Eastern Squadron", simulating a Franco-Italian conflict, with operations conducted off Sardinia.

During the following year's fleet maneuvers, which began on 10 June, Enrico Dandolo was assigned to the "defending squadron", along with the ironclads Palestro, Castelfidardo, and Affondatore, the protected cruiser Dogali, the torpedo cruiser Folgore, and several smaller vessels. The first half of the maneuvers tested the ability to attack and defend the Strait of Messina, and concluded in time for a fleet review by King Umberto I on the 21st. The second phase consisted of joint maneuvers with the Italian Army; the fleet was tasked with attempting to force an amphibious landing, which it effected at San Vicenzo on 30 July, the last day of the exercises.

Enrico Dandolo took part in the annual 1888 fleet maneuvers, along with the ironclads Lepanto, Italia, Duilio, and San Martino, one protected cruiser, four torpedo cruisers, and numerous smaller vessels. The maneuvers consisted of close-order drills and a simulated attack on and defense of La Spezia. The ship served as the flagship of the 3rd Division of the Active Squadron during the 1893 fleet maneuvers, along with Affondatore, the torpedo cruiser Goito, and four torpedo boats. During the maneuvers, which lasted from 6 August to 5 September, the ships of the Active Squadron simulated a French attack on the Italian fleet. For the rest of the year, Enrico Dandolo was assigned to the 2nd Division of the Italian fleet, along with the protected cruiser Vesuvio and the torpedo cruiser Partenope.

=== 1895–1920 ===
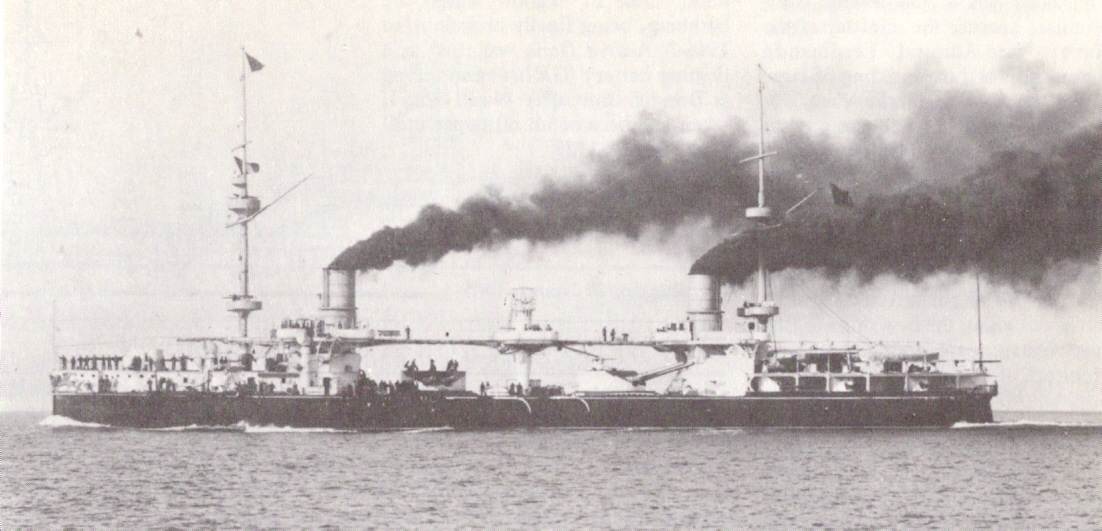
Enrico Dandolo on 6 December 1898 after her reconstruction

She was thoroughly reconstructed between 1895 and 1898 to a design created by Inspector Engineer Giacinto Pulino. The ship's old, slow-firing 17.7 in guns were replaced with new 250 mm (10 in) guns, and she received a new secondary battery to defend the ship against torpedo boats. The battery consisted of five 120 mm (4.7 in) 40-caliber guns, sixteen 57 mm (2.24 in) 43-caliber quick-firing guns, eight 37 mm (1.5 in) 20-caliber revolver cannon, and four machine guns. The main battery guns were placed in significantly smaller turrets that had 220 mm (8.8 in) of armor plating; the lighter guns and turrets reduced the ship's displacement to 10,679 t (10,510 long tons; 11,772 short tons) normally and 11,264 t (11,086 long tons; 12,416 short tons) at full load. Enrico Dandolo also received a new engine, though her performance remained the same. The ship's crew increased to 495.

In 1901, Enrico Dandolo was joined in the 2nd Division by the ironclads Andrea Doria and Francesco Morosini, the armored cruiser Carlo Alberto, Partenope, and three torpedo boats. She remained in service in the Active Squadron the following year, with Andrea Doria, Francesco Morosini, the three Re Umberto-class ironclads, and the new pre-dreadnought battleship Ammiraglio di Saint Bon. In 1905, Enrico Dandolo was transferred to the Reserve Squadron, along with the three Ruggiero di Laurias and the three Re Umbertos, three cruisers, and sixteen torpedo boats. This squadron only entered active service for two months of the year for training maneuvers, and the rest of the year was spent with reduced crews. She thereafter served in the Gunnery School as a training ship, along with the torpedo cruiser Saetta.

At the start of the Italo-Turkish War of 1911–1912, Enrico Dandolo was assigned to the 5th Division of the Italian fleet, along with the ironclads Italia and Lepanto, but she saw no action during the conflict. She became the guardship at Tobruk, Libya in 1913 and was transferred to Brindisi and Venice during World War I. While stationed at Brindisi, six of her 37 mm guns were removed. She was stricken on 23 January 1920 and later broken up for scrap.
