= Ruggiero di Lauria-class ironclad =

Ironclad warship class of the Italian Royal Navy

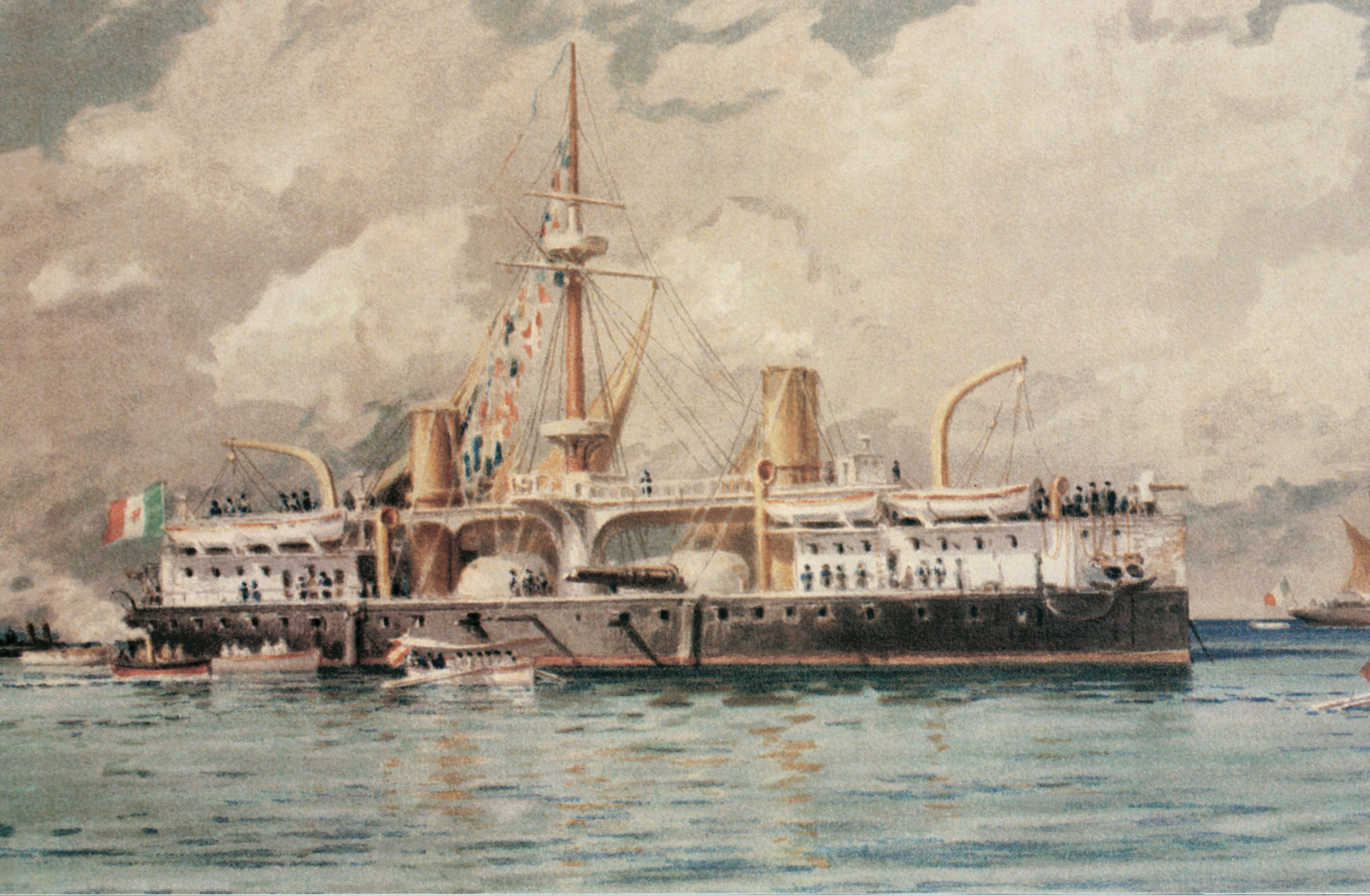
- Painting of Ruggiero di Lauria

Class overview
- Name: Ruggiero di Lauria class
- Builders: Regio Cantiere di Castellammare di Stabia; Venetian Arsenal; Arsenale di La Spezia
- Operators: Regia Marina
- Preceded by: Italia class
- Succeeded by: Re Umberto class
- Built: 1881–1891
- In commission: 1888–1911
- Completed: 3
- Retired: 3

General characteristics
- Type: Ironclad battleship
- Displacement: Normal: 9,886 long tons (10,045 t); Full load: 10,997 long tons (11,173 t)
- Length: 105.9 m (347 ft 5 in) length overall
- Beam: 19.84 m (65 ft 1 in)
- Draft: 8.29 to 8.37 m (27 ft 2 in to 27 ft 6 in)
- Installed power: 8 × fire-tube boilers; 10,591 ihp (7,898 kW)
- Propulsion: 2 × marine steam engines; 2 × screw propellers
- Speed: 16 to 17 knots (30 to 31 km/h; 18 to 20 mph)
- Range: 2,800 nmi (5,186 km) at 10 knots (19 km/h; 12 mph)
- Complement: 507–509
- Armament: 4 × 432 mm (17 in) 27-cal. guns; 2 × 152 mm (6 in) 32-cal. guns; 4 × 356 mm (14 in) submerged torpedo tubes
- Armor: Belt: 451 mm (17.75 in); Deck: 76 mm (3 in); Barbettes: 361 mm (14.2 in); Conning tower: 249 mm (9.8 in)

The Ruggiero di Lauria class was a class of ironclad battleships built for the Italian Regia Marina (Royal Navy) during the late 19th century. The three ships—Ruggiero di Lauria, Francesco Morosini, and Andrea Doria–were improved versions of the earlier Duilio-class ironclads. The primary improvements were new breech-loading guns, better armor protection, and more powerful machinery. The ships, designed by Giuseppe Micheli, marked a temporary diversion from the ideas of Benedetto Brin, who had designed the two preceding classes along with the following class.

Construction of the ships was very lengthy, and by the time they were completed, the first pre-dreadnought battleships were being built. Rendered obsolescent by these new ships, the Ruggiero di Laurias had limited careers. The spent their time in service alternating between the Active and Reserve Squadrons, and they were primarily occupied with conducting training exercises. The ships were removed from service in 1909–1911; Francesco Morosini was expended as a target ship, while Ruggiero di Lauria became a floating oil tank and Andrea Doria was converted into a depot ship. During World War I, Andrea Doria returned to service as a guard ship before being repurposed for oil storage after the war, eventually being broken up in 1929. Ruggiero di Lauria survived until 1943, when she was sunk by bombers during World War II. Her wreck was salvaged in 1945.

== Design ==
Starting in the 1870s, following the Italian fleet's defeat at the Battle of Lissa, the Italians began a large naval expansion program, initially aimed at countering the Austro-Hungarian Navy. The program included the Duilio and Italia classes, which were both designed by Benedetto Brin. The Ruggiero di Laurias were authorized in the naval program for 1880, and the task of designing them was assigned to Engineering Inspector Giuseppe Micheli. Vice Admiral Ferdinando Acton opposed the very large ironclads designed by Brin, and so he charged Micheli with creating a ship that would not exceed 10,000 long tons (10,160 t). Micheli chose to base his new design on a cut-down version of Duilio, though he incorporated several improvements, including more modern, breech-loading guns, a more powerful propulsion system, and new, more effective compound armor. Micheli's tenure as the designer for Italian capital ships was short-lived, with Brin returning to create the follow-on Re Umberto class, the final members of the second generation of Italian ironclads.

=== General characteristics and machinery ===
Line-drawing of the Ruggiero di Lauria class

The ships of the Ruggiero di Lauria class were 100 meters (330 ft) long between perpendiculars and 105.9 meters (347 ft) long overall. They had a beam of 19.84 m (65 ft 1 in) and a draft of 8.29 to 8.37 m (27 ft 2 in to 27 ft 6 in). They displaced 9,886 long tons (10,045 t) normally and up to 11,145 long tons (11,324 t) at full load. The ships were built with a high forecastle to improve sea-keeping over the Duilio class. A single military mast with fighting tops was located amidships; a hurricane deck connected the forward and aft superstructure. Both sections of superstructure was used to store several smaller boats; each section also had a large crane to handle the boats. The ships had a crew of 507–509 officers and men.

Their propulsion system consisted of a pair of compound marine steam engines, each driving a single screw propeller, with steam supplied by eight coal-fired, cylindrical fire-tube boilers. The boilers were trunked into two funnels, one in the forward superstructure and the other in the aft superstructure. Ruggiero di Lauria was the fastest member of the class, reaching a top speed of 17 knots (31 km/h; 20 mph) at 10,591 indicated horsepower (7,898 kW). Francesco Morosini and Andrea Dorea had a top speed of around 16 kn (30 km/h; 18 mph). The ships could steam for 2,800 nautical miles (5,200 km; 3,200 mi) at a speed of 10 knots (19 km/h; 12 mph).

=== Armament and armor ===
The Ruggiero di Laurias were armed with a main battery of four 432 mm (17 in) 27-caliber rifled breechloading guns, mounted in two pairs n echelon in a central barbette. These guns were the A 1882 model, and they fired a 910-kilogram (2,000 lb) shell at a muzzle velocity of around 560 metres per second (1,837 ft/s). Their rate of fire was very slow, taking eight minutes to reload after each shot. They carried a secondary battery of two 152 mm (6 in) 32-caliber guns, one at the bow and the other at the stern, and four 120 mm (4.7 in) 32-caliber guns. The 152 mm gun fired a variety of shells, including 46 kg (102 lb) armor-piercing shells, while the 120 mm guns fired 16 kg (36 lb) shells. From 1900, the ships had their secondary battery significantly expanded with two 75 mm (3 in) guns, ten 57 mm (2.24 in) 40-caliber guns, twelve 37 mm (1.5 in) guns, five 37 mm revolver cannon, and two machine guns. As was customary for capital ships of the period, they carried five 356 mm (14 in) torpedo tubes submerged in the hull. The torpedoes carried a 125 kg (276 lb) warhead and had a range of 600 m (2,000 ft).

The ships' protection scheme consisted of compound armor. The Ruggiero di Laurias had an armored belt that was 451 mm (17.75 in) thick; the citadel received the same thickness of steel. They had an armored deck that was 76 mm (3 in) thick, and their conning tower was armored with 249 mm (9.8 in) of steel plate. The barbette had 361 mm (14.2 in) of steel armor.

== Construction ==
The ships' construction times were very lengthy; by the time they were completed, the United Kingdom had begun building the Royal Sovereign-class battleships, the first pre-dreadnought battleships, which rendered older ironclad battleships obsolescent. In addition, technological progress, particularly in armor production techniques—first Harvey armor and then Krupp armor—contributed to the ships' rapid obsolescence.

Construction data
| Name | Builder | Laid down | Launched | Completed |
|---|---|---|---|---|
| Ruggiero di Lauria | Regio Cantiere di Castellammare di Stabia | 3 August 1881 | 9 August 1884 | 1 February 1888 |
| Francesco Morosini | Venetian Arsenal | 4 December 1881 | 30 July 1885 | 21 August 1889 |
| Andrea Doria | Arsenale di La Spezia | 7 January 1882 | 21 November 1885 | 16 May 1891 |

== Service history ==
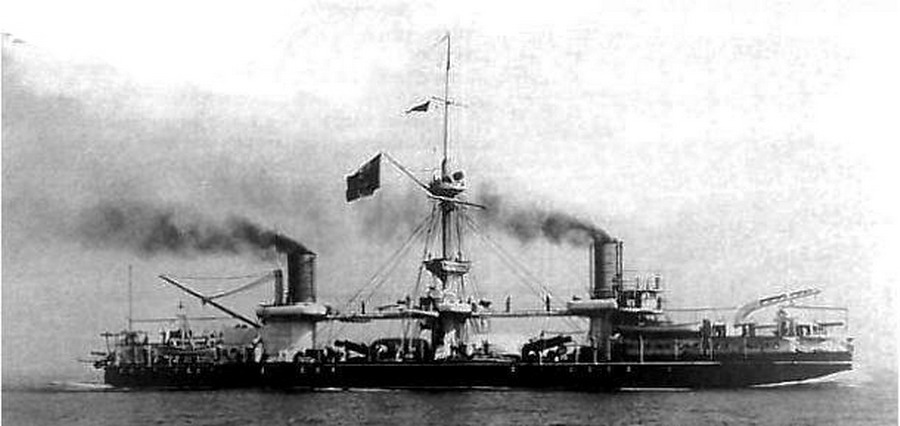
Andrea Doria underway on 18 April 1899

The three Ruggiero di Laurias served in the Active Squadron for the first several years of their careers, into the mid-1890s. By 1895, Ruggiero di Lauria had been transferred to the Reserve Squadron, though Andrea Doria and Francesco Morosini remained in the Active Squadron. That year, Ruggiero di Lauria and Andrea Doria joined the Active Squadron for a major cruise to Britain and Germany. All three ships were assigned to the Active Squadron in 1899. That year, Ruggiero di Lauria and Andrea Doria took part in a naval review in Cagliari for the Italian King Umberto I, which included a French and British squadron as well.

All three ships had been transferred to the Reserve Squadron by 1905, and they were quickly discarded. In 1908, the Italian Navy decided to discard Ruggiero di Lauria and Francesco Morosini, while Andrea Doria remained in service until 1911. Francesco Morosini was expended as a target ship for torpedo experiments in September 1909. Ruggiero di Lauria was converted into a floating oil tank in 1909 and was renamed GM 45; she was sunk in an air raid in 1943 during World War II. Andrea Doria served as a depot ship until Italy entered World War I in May 1915, when she was employed as a guard ship in Brindisi. After the war, she too was converted into an oil tank, before being broken up for scrap in 1929.
