= Duilio-class ironclad =

Ironclad warship class of the Italian Royal Navy

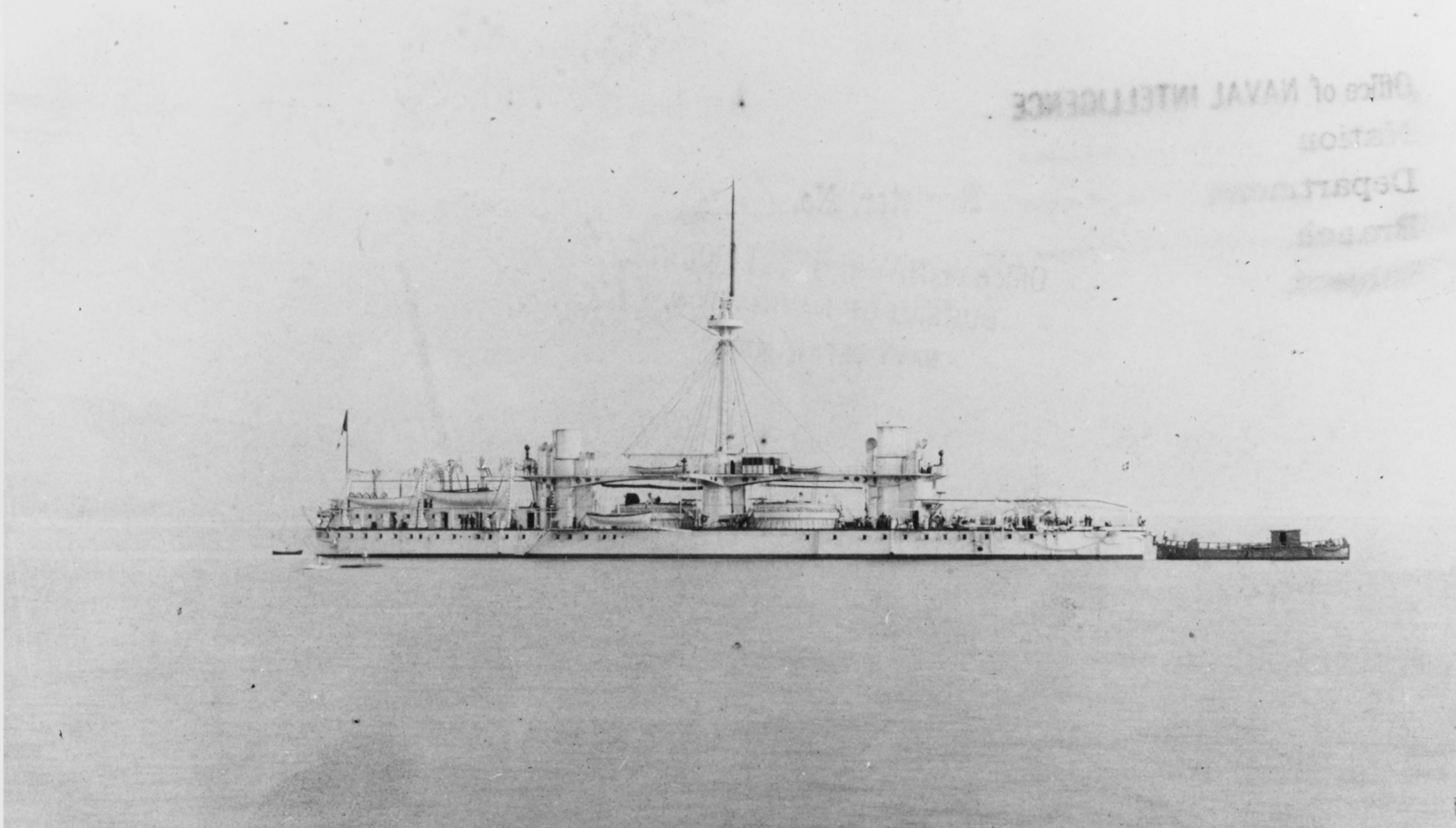
- Enrico Dandolo shortly after her completion in 1882

Class overview
- Name: Duilio-class ironclad
- Builders: Arsenale di La Spezia; R C di Castellammare di Stabia
- Operators: Regia Marina
- Preceded by: Principe Amedeo class
- Succeeded by: Italia class
- Built: 1873–1882
- In service: 1880–1920
- Completed: 2
- Scrapped: 2

General characteristics
- Type: Ironclad battleship
- Displacement: Normal: 10,962 long tons (11,138 t); Full load: 12,071 long tons (12,265 t)
- Length: 109.16 m (358 ft 2 in)
- Beam: 19.74 m (64 ft 9 in)
- Draft: 8.31 m (27 ft 3 in)
- Installed power: 8 × fire-tube boilers; 7,711 ihp (5,750 kW)
- Propulsion: 2 × marine steam engines; 2 × screw propellers
- Speed: 15.04 knots (27.85 km/h; 17.31 mph)
- Range: 3,760 nmi (6,960 km; 4,330 mi) at 10 kn (19 km/h; 12 mph)
- Complement: 420
- Armament: 4 × 450 mm (17.7 in) guns; 3 × 356 mm (14 in) torpedo tubes
- Armor: Belt: 546 mm (21.5 in); Turrets: 432 mm (17 in); Deck: 30 to 51 mm (1.2 to 2 in)

The Duilio class was a pair of ironclad turret ships built for the Royal Italian Navy (Regia Marina) in the 1870s and 1880s. The two ships, Duilio and Enrico Dandolo, were fitted with the largest guns available, 450 mm (17.7 in) rifled muzzle-loading guns, and were the largest, fastest and most powerful ships of their day. To save weight on such large vessels, the ship's designer, Benedetto Brin adopted a radical solution for the time: he reserved armor only for the central portion of the ship where it protected the ships' engines and ammunition magazines, while the rest of the hull was extensively sub-divided with watertight compartments.

Both ships had uneventful careers. They spent the majority of their time in service with the Active and Reserve Squadrons of the main Italian fleet. There, they were primarily occupied with conducting training exercises. In 1895–1898, Enrico Dandolo was heavily reconstructed, but the excessive cost of the modernization prevented Duilio from being similarly rebuilt. Both ships were reassigned as training ships in the early to mid-1900s. Duilio was stricken from the naval register in 1909 and converted into a floating oil tank, while Enrico Dandolo remained in service as a guard ship during World War I. She was sent to the breaker's yard in 1920. Duilio's ultimate fate is unknown.

== Design ==
Starting in the early 1870s, following the Italian fleet's defeat at the Battle of Lissa, the Italians began a large naval expansion program, initially aimed at countering the Austro-Hungarian Navy. In addition, the opening of the Suez Canal in 1869 promised to restore the strategic significance of the Mediterranean; Italy would need a powerful fleet to assert its will and protect its merchant shipping in the region. The program began with the Duilio class, which was designed by the naval architect Benedetto Brin. Originally intended to carry Armstrong 35 t (34-long-ton; 39-short-ton) muzzle-loading guns, they were modified several times during their lengthy construction time to accommodate the largest guns that Armstrong produced, next to 60 t (59-long-ton; 66-short-ton) guns and ultimately to the 100-long-ton (102 t) 450 mm gun.

Brin had originally wanted to build three ships, but their great cost forced him to settle for two. At the time, Italy's industrial capacity was insufficient to build the ships out of domestic material. Everything from the iron used to build the hulls to the ships' machinery and guns had to be imported. The Duilio class formed the basis for the following two ironclad designs, the Italia class, also designed by Brin and laid down in 1876, and the Ruggiero di Lauria class, designed by Giuseppe Micheli and laid down in 1881–1882.

=== General characteristics and machinery ===
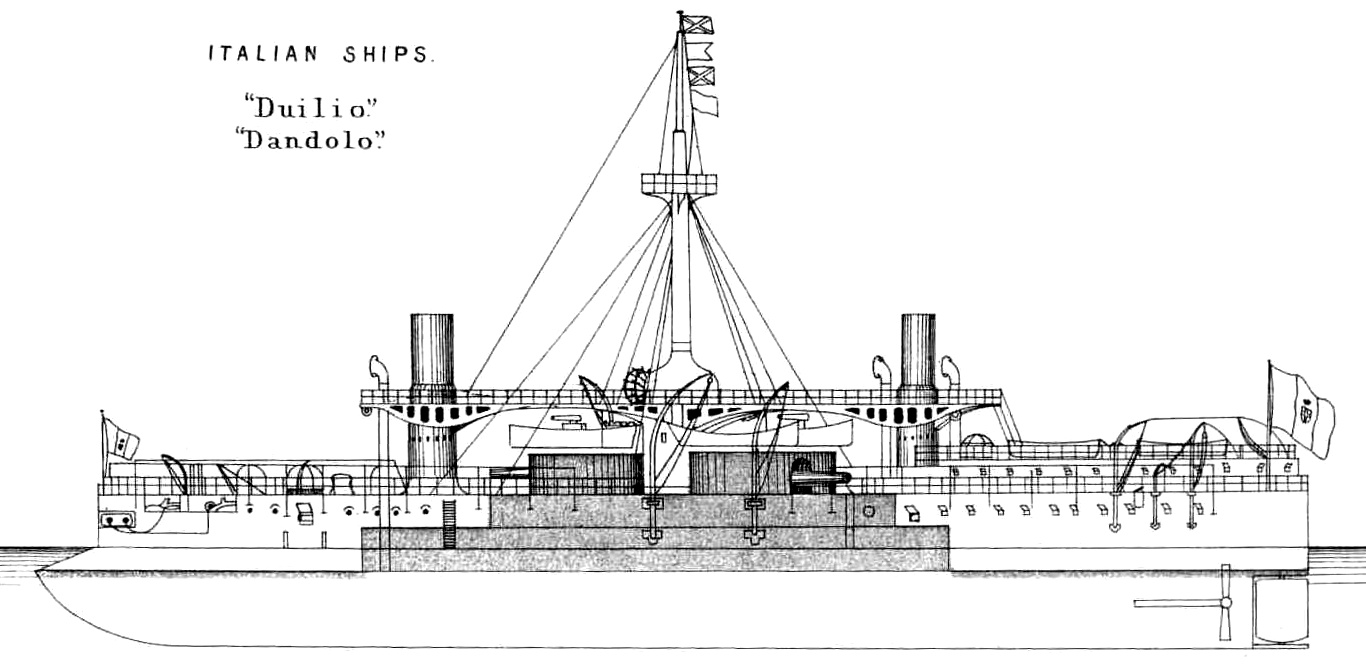
Line drawing of the Duilio class

The ships of the Duilio class were 103.5 meters (339 ft 7 in) long between perpendiculars and 109.16 m (358 ft 2 in) long overall. Duilio had a beam of 19.74 m (64 ft 9 in), while Enrico Dandolo had a slightly narrower beam of 19.65 m (64 ft 6 in). The ships had a draft of 8.31 to 8.36 m (27 ft 3 in to 27 ft 5 in). Duilio displaced 10,962 long tons (11,138 t) normally and up to 12,071 long tons (12,265 t) at full load; Enrico Dandolo was slightly heavier, at 11,025 long tons (11,202 t) and 12,037 long tons (12,230 t), respectively.

The ships had a small superstructure forward that included the conning tower and one funnel; this was connected via a hurricane deck to a central military mast and the aft superstructure, with included a second funnel. They were the first ironclads in any navy to dispense with sails, rigged only with the military mast. The ships had a crew of 420 officers and men, which later increased to 515. Both ships carried a number of smaller boats, but Duilio was built with a compartment in her stern to house a small torpedo boat, the 26.5 long tons (26.9 t) Clio.

The ships' propulsion system consisted of two vertical compound steam engines each driving a single screw propeller, with steam supplied by eight coal-fired, rectangular boilers. The boilers were in two groups, one forward and one aft, and each group was trunked into a single large funnel. Duilio's engines produced a top speed of 15.04 knots (27.85 km/h; 17.31 mph) at 7,711 indicated horsepower (5,750 kW). Specific figures for Enrico Dandolo's original engines have not survived. The new engines installed in her 1895–1898 refit were slightly more powerful, producing a speed of 15.6 knots (28.9 km/h; 18.0 mph) from 8,045 ihp (5,999 kW). The ships could steam for 3,760 nautical miles (6,960 km; 4,330 mi) at a speed of 10 knots (19 km/h; 12 mph); the range fell to 2,875 nmi (5,324 km; 3,308 mi) at 13 knots (24 km/h; 15 mph).

=== Armament and armor ===
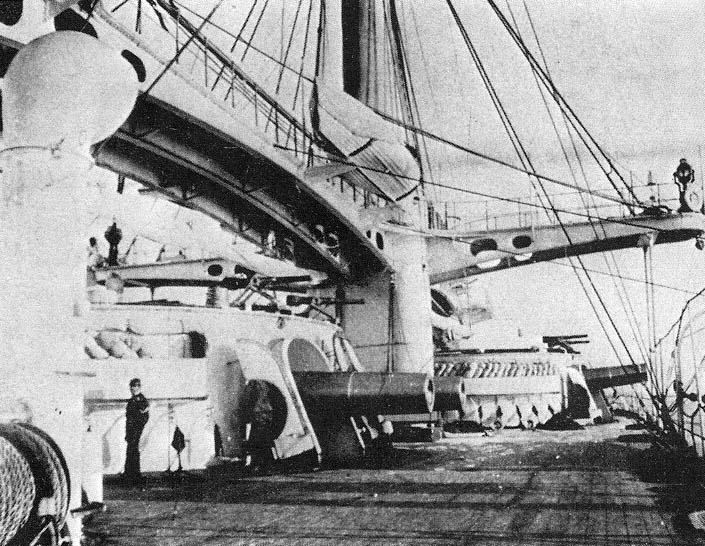
Duilio's two main battery turrets

Duilio and Enrico Dandolo were armed with a main battery of four 450 mm (17.7 in) 100-ton guns of 20-caliber, mounted in two turrets placed en echelon amidships. These guns fired a 1,905-pound (864 kg) shell at a muzzle velocity of 1,490 to 1,670 feet per second (450 to 510 m/s) depending on the propellant charge. They had a rate of fire of one shot per fifteen minutes; the guns fired so slowly primarily as a result of their great size. As was customary for capital ships of the period, they carried three 356 mm (14 in) torpedo tubes. The torpedoes carried a 125 kg (276 lb) warhead and had a range of 600 m (2,000 ft).

Throughout their careers, the ships' armament was revised significantly. In 1890, Duilio received three 120 mm (4.7 in) 40-caliber guns; These guns fired a 36 lb (16 kg) shell at a velocity of 2,854 ft/s (870 m/s). In 1900, two 75 mm (3 in) guns, eight 57 mm (2.24 in) 40-caliber quick-firing guns, and four 37 mm (1.5 in) 20-caliber revolver cannon were also added. The 57 mm guns were manufactured by Nordenfelt and they fired a 6 lb (2.7 kg) shell. Enrico Dandolo was rebuilt in 1895–1898, and her armament was completely revised. In place of her 17.7 in guns she received four 250 mm (10 in) 40-caliber QF guns. These guns fired a 494.3 lb (224.2 kg) armor-piercing shell at a velocity of 2,460 ft/s (750 m/s). Her secondary battery consisted of five 120 mm (4.7 in) 40-caliber guns, sixteen 57 mm (2.2 in) 43-caliber QF guns—slightly longer versions of the same-caliber guns fitted to Duilio—eight 37 mm (1.5 in) 20-caliber Hotchkiss revolver cannon, and four machine guns.

The Duilio-class ships were protected by steel belt armor that was 546 mm (21.5 in) thick at its strongest section, which protected the ship's magazines and machinery spaces. The belt armor plate was manufactured by the French steel mill Schneider-Creusot. The central citadel and the gun turrets received new nickel steel armor. Both ends of the belt were connected by transverse bulkheads that were 400 mm (15.75 in) thick. They had an armored deck that was 28 to 51 mm (1.1 to 2 in) thick. Their gun turrets were armored with 432 mm (17 in) of steel plate, while Enrico Dandolo's new turrets had only 220 mm (8.8 in) of steel plate. The ships' bow and stern were not armored, but they were extensively subdivided into a cellular "raft" that was intended to reduce the risk of flooding.

Enrico Dandolo after her reconstruction

The lack of armor on both ends of the design sparked controversy: after the former Chief Constructor of the Royal Navy Edward James Reed visited the ships under construction, he criticized this particular design feature, arguing that in case of damage to either end the entering water would have compromised the stability; the new Italian Minister of the Navy, Simone Pacoret di Saint-Bon, replied during a Parliament session that such an event was very unlikely, as it could happen only if all the bulkheads of the watertight compartments were destroyed.

== Ships ==
Construction data
Name	Namesake	Builder	Laid down	Launched	Completed
Duilio	Gaius Duilius	Regio Cantiere di Castellammare di Stabia, Castellammare di Stabia	24 April 1873	8 May 1876	6 January 1880
Enrico Dandolo	Enrico Dandolo	Arsenale di La Spezia, La Spezia	8 January 1873	10 July 1878	11 April 1882

== Service history ==
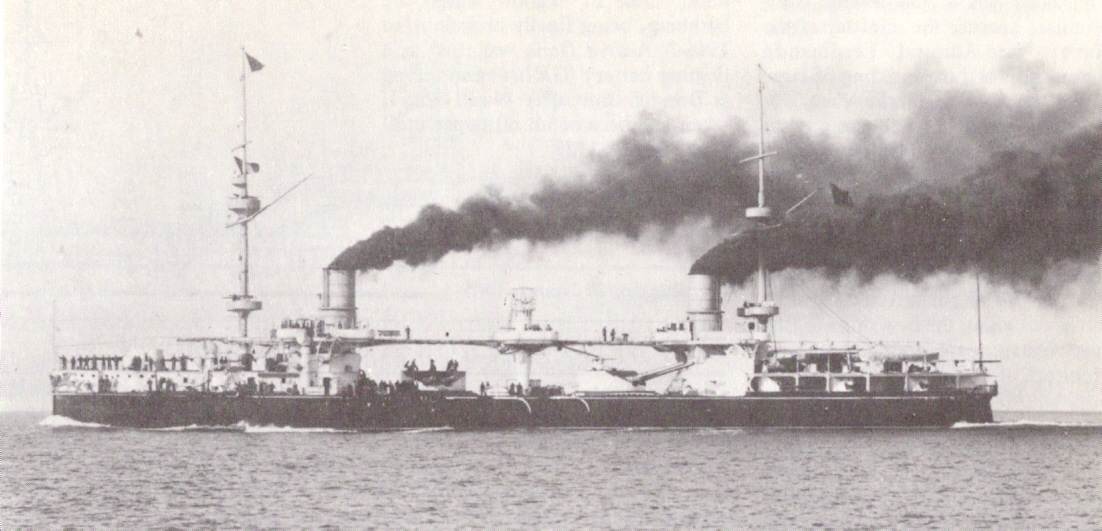
Enrico Dandolo after her reconstruction in the 1890s

During gunnery trials in March 1880 shortly after entering service, one of Duilio's guns in her aft turret burst. After joining the fleet, both ships served in the Active Squadron, though they alternated between it and the Reserve Squadron throughout their careers. During this period, they were chiefly occupied with conducting training maneuvers. Italy joined the Triple Alliance with the German Empire and Austria-Hungary in 1882, shortly after the two Duilios entered service; as a result, the country's most likely opponent became France. The exercises in which the ships took part therefore frequently simulated defensive operations against a hostile, numerically superior French Mediterranean Fleet. For the 1893 maneuvers, Duilio was part of the squadron that simulated the defending Italian fleet, while Enrico Dandolo operated on the opposing force.

Starting in 1895, Enrico Dandolo was extensively modernized, receiving an entirely new armament and new engines, as well as a second military mast. Duilio received a much more limited refit in 1900, primarily receiving a large number of secondary guns. The Navy decided against rebuilding her along the same lines as Enrico Dandolo due to the prohibitive cost of the project. In 1902, Diulio was removed from front-line service and thereafter employed as a training ship. Enrico Dandolo followed her in 1905 for service as a gunnery training vessel. In 1909, Duilio was stricken from the naval register, disarmed, and converted into a floating oil tank. Her ultimate fate is unknown. Enrico Dandolo continued on in service for a few more years, first becoming a guard ship at Tobruk, Libya in 1913. After Italy entered World War I in May 1915, she was transferred to Brindisi and later Venice, where she continued guard ship duties. She was stricken in January 1920 and broken up for scrap.
