= Italian cruiser Aretusa =

Torpedo cruiser of the Italian Royal Navy

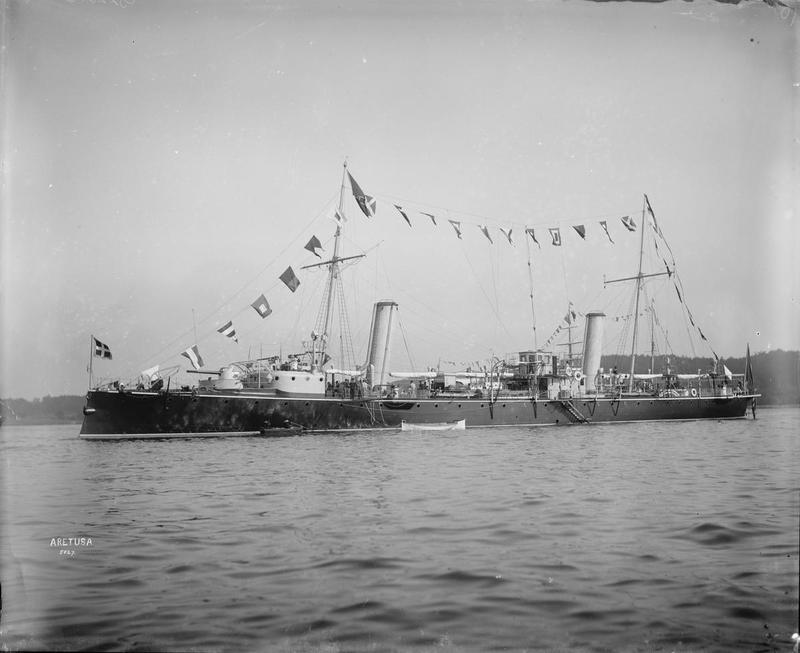
- Aretusa in 1895

History

Italy
- Name: Aretusa
- Namesake: Arethusa
- Builder: Cantiere navale fratelli Orlando, Livorno
- Laid down: 1 June 1889
- Launched: 14 March 1891
- Commissioned: 1 September 1892
- Fate: Discarded December 1912

General characteristics
- Class & type: Partenope-class torpedo cruiser
- Displacement: Normal: 833 long tons (846 t)
- Length: 73.1 m (239 ft 10 in)
- Beam: 8.22 m (27 ft)
- Draft: 3.48 m (11 ft 5 in)
- Installed power: 4 × locomotive boilers; 3,884 to 4,422 ihp (2,896 to 3,297 kW)
- Propulsion: 2 × triple-expansion steam engines; 2 × screw propellers
- Speed: 18.1 to 20.8 knots (33.5 to 38.5 km/h; 20.8 to 23.9 mph)
- Range: 1,800 nautical miles (3,300 km; 2,100 mi) at 10 knots (19 km/h; 12 mph)
- Complement: 96–121
- Armament: 1 × 120 mm (4.7 in) gun; 6 × 57 mm (2.24 in) guns; 3 × 37 mm (1.5 in) guns; 5 × 450 mm (17.7 in) torpedo tubes
- Armor: Deck: 1.6 in (41 mm); Conning tower: 1.6 in

Aretusa was a torpedo cruiser of the Partenope class built for the Italian Regia Marina (Royal Navy) in the 1880s. Laid down in June 1889 at the Cantiere navale fratelli Orlando shipyard, she was launched in March 1891 and was commissioned in September 1892. Her main armament were her six torpedo tubes, which were supported by a battery of ten small-caliber guns. Aretusa spent most of her career in the main Italian fleet, where she was primarily occupied with training exercises. At the start of the Italo-Turkish War in September 1911, she was assigned to the Red Sea Squadron in Italian Eritrea. She bombarded Ottoman positions in the Arabian Peninsula and took part in a blockade of the coast. Worn out by the end of the war in October 1912, Aretusa was sold for scrap that December and broken up.

== Design ==
Plan and profile of the Partenope class

The Partenope-class cruisers were derivatives of the earlier, experimental Goito-class cruisers, themselves based on the preceding cruiser Tripoli. The class marked a temporary shift toward the ideas of the Jeune École in Italian naval thinking. The doctrine emphasized the use of small, torpedo-armed craft to destroy expensive ironclads.

Aretusa was 73.1 meters (239 ft 10 in) long overall and had a beam of 8.22 m (27 ft) and an average draft of 3.48 m (11 ft 5 in). She displaced 833 long tons (846 t) normally. The ship had a short forecastle deck that terminated at the conning tower. She had a crew of between 96 and 121 personnel.

Her propulsion system consisted of a pair of horizontal triple-expansion steam engines, each driving a single screw propeller. Steam was supplied by four coal-fired locomotive boilers, which were vented through two widely spaced funnels. Specific figures for Aretusa's engine performance have not survived, but the ships of her class had top speeds of 18.1 to 20.8 knots (33.5 to 38.5 km/h; 20.8 to 23.9 mph) at 3,884 to 4,422 indicated horsepower (2,896 to 3,297 kW). The ship had a cruising radius of about 1,800 nautical miles (3,300 km; 2,100 mi) at a speed of 10 knots (19 km/h; 12 mph).

Aretusa was armed with a main battery of one 120 mm (4.7 in) /40 gun placed on the forecastle. Close-range defense against torpedo boats was provided by a secondary battery of six 57 mm (2.24 in) /43 guns mounted singly. (Note: "/40" refers to the length of the gun in terms of calibers, meaning that the length of the barrel is 40 times its internal diameter.) She was also equipped with three 37 mm (1.5 in) /20 guns in single mounts. Her primary offensive weapon was her five 450 mm (17.7 in) torpedo tubes. The ship was protected by an armored deck that was up to 1.6 in (41 mm) thick; her conning tower was armored with the same thickness of steel plate.

== Service history ==
Aretusa in the late 1890s

Aretusa was laid down at the Cantiere navale fratelli Orlando (Orlando Brothers' Shipyard) in Livorno on 1 June 1889, and was launched on 14 March 1891. After fitting-out work was completed, the ship was commissioned into the fleet on 1 September 1892. During the 1893 fleet maneuvers, Aretusa served with the 3rd Division of the Reserve Squadron, along with the protected cruisers Vesuvio and Ettore Fieramosca and four torpedo boats. During the maneuvers, which lasted from 6 August to 5 September, the ships of the Reserve Squadron defended against a simulated attack by the Active Squadron, which gamed a French attack on the Italian fleet. Beginning on 14 October 1984, the Italian fleet, including Aretusa, assembled in Genoa for a naval review held in honor of King Umberto I at the commissioning of the new ironclad Re Umberto. The festivities lasted three days.

In 1895, Aretusa was stationed in the 2nd Maritime Department, split between Taranto and Naples, along with most of the torpedo cruisers in the Italian fleet. These included her sister ships Partenope, Minerva, Euridice, Iride, Urania, and Caprera, the four Goito-class cruisers, and Tripoli. Aretusa joined the ironclads Re Umberto, Sardegna, Ruggiero di Lauria, and Andrea Doria and the cruisers Stromboli, Etruria, and Partenope for a visit to Spithead in the United Kingdom in July 1895. As of 1898, Aretusa was assigned to the Active Squadron, with included the ironclads Sicilia and Sardegna and two other cruisers.

=== Italo-Turkish War ===
At the start of the Italo-Turkish War in September 1911, Aretusa was stationed in Italian Eritrea in the Red Sea Squadron. Italian naval forces in the region also included five protected cruisers and several smaller vessels. Shortly after the start of the war on 2 October, Aretusa and the gunboat Volturno encountered the Ottoman torpedo cruiser Peyk-i Şevket off Al Hudaydah. In a short engagement, the Italians vessels forced the Ottoman ship to flee into Al Hudaydah, bombarded the port facilities, and then withdrew. Peyk-i Şevket was later interned in British-controlled Suez.

The threat of an Ottoman attack from the Arabian Peninsula led the Italian High Command to reinforce the Red Sea Squadron; the additional ships included another cruiser and several destroyers. The protected cruiser Piemonte and two destroyers annihilated a force of seven Ottoman gunboats in the Battle of Kunfuda Bay on 7 January 1912. Following the neutralization of Ottoman naval forces in the region, Aretusa and the rest of the Italian ships then commenced a bombardment campaign against the Turkish ports in the Red Sea before declaring a blockade of the city of Al Hudaydah on 26 January.

On 27 July and 12 August, Aretusa, her sister ship Caprera, and Piemonte conducted two bombardments of Al Hudaydah. During the second attack, they destroyed an Ottoman ammunition dump. With the threat of an Ottoman attack greatly reduced, the High Command thereafter began to withdraw forces from the Red Sea Squadron. By the end of August, the unit was reduced to three protected cruisers, Aretusa, Caprera and two auxiliaries. On 14 October, the Ottoman government agreed to sign a peace treaty, ending the war. Aretusa's career ended shortly thereafter; the Regia Marina discarded the ship in December and she was subsequently broken up for scrap.
