= Italian cruiser Iride =

Torpedo cruiser of the Italian Royal Navy

- Iride probably in the late 1890s

History

Italy
- Name: Iride
- Builder: Regio Cantiere di Castellammare di Stabia, Castellammare di Stabia
- Laid down: 21 February 1889
- Launched: 20 July 1890
- Commissioned: 1 November 1892
- Fate: Sold for scrap in December 1920

General characteristics
- Class & type: Partenope-class torpedo cruiser
- Displacement: Normal: 931 long tons (946 t)
- Length: 73.1 m (239 ft 10 in)
- Beam: 8.22 m (27 ft)
- Draft: 3.48 m (11 ft 5 in)
- Installed power: 4 × locomotive boilers; 3,884 to 4,422 ihp (2,896 to 3,297 kW)
- Propulsion: 2 × triple-expansion steam engines; 2 × screw propellers
- Speed: 18.1 to 20.8 knots (33.5 to 38.5 km/h; 20.8 to 23.9 mph)
- Range: 1,800 nautical miles (3,300 km; 2,100 mi) at 10 knots (19 km/h; 12 mph)
- Complement: 96–121
- Armament: 1 × 120 mm (4.7 in) gun; 6 × 57 mm (2.24 in) guns; 3 × 37 mm (1.5 in) guns; 6 × 450 mm (17.7 in) torpedo tubes
- Armor: Deck: 1.6 in (41 mm); Conning tower: 1.6 in

Iride was a torpedo cruiser of the Partenope class built for the Italian Regia Marina (Royal Navy) in the 1880s. Laid down in February 1889 at the Regio Cantiere di Castellammare di Stabia shipyard, she was launched in July 1890 and was commissioned in November 1892. Her main armament were her six torpedo tubes, which were supported by a battery of ten small-caliber guns. Iride spent most of her career in the main Italian fleet, where she was primarily occupied with training exercises. During the Italo-Turkish War in September 1911, she remained in Italian waters until late in the conflict; she escorted a troop convoy to North Africa in April 1912 and bombarded Ottoman positions in June and July. Iride was eventually broken up for scrap in December 1920.

== Design ==
Plan and profile of the Partenope class

The Partenope-class cruisers were derivatives of the earlier, experimental Goito-class cruisers, themselves based on the preceding cruiser Tripoli. The class marked a temporary shift toward the ideas of the Jeune École in Italian naval thinking. The doctrine emphasized the use of small, torpedo-armed craft to destroy expensive ironclads.

Iride was 73.1 meters (239 ft 10 in) long overall and had a beam of 8.22 m (27 ft) and an average draft of 3.48 m (11 ft 5 in). She displaced 931 long tons (946 t) normally. The ship had a short forecastle deck that terminated at the conning tower. She had a crew of between 96 and 121 personnel.

Her propulsion system consisted of a pair of horizontal triple-expansion steam engines, each driving a single screw propeller. Steam was supplied by four coal-fired locomotive boilers, which were vented through two widely spaced funnels. Specific figures for Iride's engine performance have not survived, but the ships of her class had top speeds of 18.1 to 20.8 knots (33.5 to 38.5 km/h; 20.8 to 23.9 mph) at 3,884 to 4,422 indicated horsepower (2,896 to 3,297 kW). The ship had a cruising radius of about 1,800 nautical miles (3,300 km; 2,100 mi) at a speed of 10 knots (19 km/h; 12 mph).

Iride was armed with a main battery of one 120 mm (4.7 in) /40 gun placed on the forecastle. Close-range defense against torpedo boats was provided by a secondary battery of six 57 mm (2.24 in) /43 guns mounted singly. (Note: "/40" refers to the length of the gun in terms of calibers, meaning that the length of the barrel is 40 times its internal diameter.) She was also equipped with three 37 mm (1.5 in) /20 guns in single mounts. Her primary offensive weapon was her six 450 mm (17.7 in) torpedo tubes. The ship was protected by an armored deck that was up to 1.6 in (41 mm) thick; her conning tower was armored with the same thickness of steel plate.

== Service history ==
Iride was laid down at the Regio Cantiere di Castellammare di Stabia (Royal Dockyard in Castellammare di Stabia) on 21 February 1889, and was launched on 20 July 1890. After fitting-out work was completed, the ship was commissioned into the fleet on 1 November 1892. Iride took part in the annual fleet exercises in 1893 in the "attacking squadron", which also included six ironclads, her sister ship Euridice and the torpedo cruisers Goito and Monzambano. Beginning on 14 October 1894, the Italian fleet, including Iride, assembled in Genoa for a naval review held in honor of King Umberto I at the commissioning of the new ironclad Re Umberto. The festivities lasted three days.

In 1895, Iride was stationed in the 2nd Maritime Department, split between Taranto and Naples, along with most of the torpedo cruisers in the Italian fleet. These included her sister ships Partenope, Aretusa, Euridice, Urania, Minerva, and Caprera, the four Goito-class cruisers, and Tripoli. In 1902, Iride was assigned as the station ship for Constantinople, responsible for safeguarding Italian interests in the Ottoman Empire.

In 1904–1905, Iride was assigned to the Levant Station in the eastern Mediterranean. She took part in the 1907 fleet maneuvers that took place in September and October that year. At the start of the Italo-Turkish War in September 1911, Iride was stationed in Italy, alternating between the ports of La Spezia and Naples, along with her sister ships Urania and Caprera. By January 1912, Iride had been stationed in Tripoli to support the garrison there against Ottoman forces. In early April, Iride, the torpedo cruiser Agordat, and six torpedo boats rendezvoused with a troop convoy carrying 10,000 men to Zuwarah near the border with Tunisia. In June and July, Iride and the armored cruiser Carlo Alberto bombarded Turkish forces near Zuara. The Ottomans eventually agreed to surrender in October, ending the war.

Italy declared neutrality after the outbreak of World War I in August 1914, but by July 1915, the Triple Entente had convinced the Italians to enter the war against the Central Powers with promises of territory acquisition in Italia irredenta. The Austro-Hungarian Navy, which had been Italy's primary rival for decades, was the primary opponent in the conflict. The Austro-Hungarian battle fleet lay in its harbors directly across the narrow Adriatic Sea. Admiral Paolo Thaon di Revel, the Italian naval chief of staff, believed that the narrow waters and numerous islands of the Adriatic allowed Austro-Hungarian submarines and minelayers to operate with a great degree of freedom. The threat from these underwater weapons to his capital ships was too serious for him to use the fleet in an active way. Instead, Revel decided to implement blockade at the relatively safer southern end of the Adriatic with the battle fleet, while smaller vessels, such as the MAS boats, conducted raids on Austro-Hungarian ships and installations. As a result, Iride did not see action during the war. She was sold for scrap in December 1920 and was subsequently broken up for scrap.
