= Italian cruiser Calatafimi =

Torpedo cruiser of the Italian Royal Navy

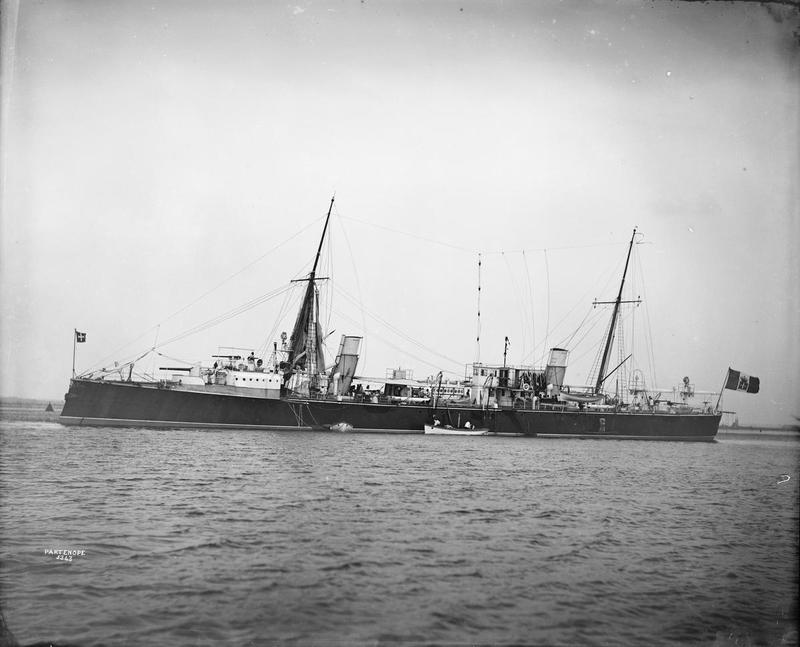
- Calatafimi's sistership Partenope c. 1895

History

Italy
- Name: Calatafimi
- Namesake: Battle of Calatafimi
- Builder: Regio Cantiere di Castellammare di Stabia, Castellammare di Stabia
- Laid down: 15 September 1891
- Launched: 18 March 1893
- Commissioned: 16 January 1894
- Fate: Sold for scrap in March 1907

General characteristics
- Class & type: Partenope-class torpedo cruiser
- Displacement: Normal: 839 long tons (852 t)
- Length: 73.1 m (239 ft 10 in)
- Beam: 8.22 m (27 ft)
- Draft: 3.48 m (11 ft 5 in)
- Installed power: 4 × locomotive boilers; 3,884 to 4,422 ihp (2,896 to 3,297 kW)
- Propulsion: 2 × triple-expansion steam engines; 2 × screw propellers
- Speed: 18.1 to 20.8 knots (33.5 to 38.5 km/h; 20.8 to 23.9 mph)
- Range: 1,800 nautical miles (3,300 km; 2,100 mi) at 10 knots (19 km/h; 12 mph)
- Complement: 96–121
- Armament: 1 × 120 mm (4.7 in) gun; 6 × 57 mm (2.24 in) guns; 3 × 37 mm (1.5 in) guns; 6 × 450 mm (17.7 in) torpedo tubes
- Armor: Deck: 1.6 in (41 mm); Conning tower: 1.6 in

Calatafimi was a torpedo cruiser of the Partenope class built for the Italian Regia Marina (Royal Navy) in the 1880s. She was built by the Cantiere navale fratelli Orlando shipyard; her keel was laid in July 1891, she was launched in May 1894, and was commissioned in December 1895. Her main armament were her five torpedo tubes, which were supported by a battery of eleven small-caliber guns. Calatafimi spent most of her career in the main Italian fleet, where she was primarily occupied with training exercises. The ship was sold in March 1907 and broken up for scrap.

== Design ==
Plan and profile of the Partenope class

The Partenope-class cruisers were derivatives of the earlier, experimental Goito-class cruisers, themselves based on the preceding cruiser Tripoli. The class marked a temporary shift toward the ideas of the Jeune École in Italian naval thinking. The doctrine emphasized the use of small, torpedo-armed craft to destroy expensive ironclads.

Calatafimi was 73.1 meters (239 ft 10 in) long overall and had a beam of 8.22 m (27 ft) and an average draft of 3.48 m (11 ft 5 in). She displaced 839 long tons (852 t) normally. The ship had a short forecastle deck that terminated at the conning tower. She had a crew of between 96 and 121 personnel.

Her propulsion system consisted of a pair of horizontal triple-expansion steam engines, each driving a single screw propeller. Steam was supplied by four coal-fired locomotive boilers, which were vented through two widely spaced funnels. Specific figures for Calatafimi's engine performance have not survived, but the ships of her class had top speeds of 18.1 to 20.8 knots (33.5 to 38.5 km/h; 20.8 to 23.9 mph) at 3,884 to 4,422 indicated horsepower (2,896 to 3,297 kW). The ship had a cruising radius of about 1,800 nautical miles (3,300 km; 2,100 mi) at a speed of 10 knots (19 km/h; 12 mph).

Calatafimi was armed with a main battery of one 120 mm (4.7 in) /40 gun placed on the forecastle. Close-range defense against torpedo boats was provided by a secondary battery of six 57 mm (2.24 in) /43 guns mounted singly. (Note: "/40" refers to the length of the gun in terms of calibers, meaning that the length of the barrel is 40 times its internal diameter.) She was also equipped with three 37 mm (1.5 in) /20 guns in single mounts. Her primary offensive weapon was her six 450 mm (17.7 in) torpedo tubes. The ship was protected by an armored deck that was up to 1.6 in (41 mm) thick; her conning tower was armored with the same thickness of steel plate.

== Service history ==
The new cruiser was originally to have been named Tersicore, but she was renamed Calatafimi the day construction began. The last member of her class, Calatafimi was laid down on 15 September 1891 at the Regio Cantiere di Castellammare di Stabia (Royal Dockyard in Castellammare di Stabia), and was launched on 18 March 1893. After fitting-out work was completed, the ship was commissioned into the fleet on 16 January 1894. The following year, she was assigned to the 2nd Division of the Permanent Squadron, which included her sister ship Euridice, the ironclad battleship Francesco Morosini, and the protected cruiser Etruria. The Squadron was based at La Spezia at the time, though Calatafimi was stationed primarily in Taranto and Naples, along with most of the other torpedo cruisers of the Italian fleet.

In 1895, unrest in the Ottoman Empire that killed hundreds of foreign nationals prompted several of the European great powers to send an international fleet to pressure the Ottomans into compensating the victims. In November, a small Italian squadron sent to Smyrna to join the fleet in there; Calatafimi was mobilized as part of a larger force in Naples that consisted of the ironclads Francesco Morosini, Lepanto, and Ruggiero di Lauria, the protected cruiser Elba, the torpedo cruiser Folgore, and five torpedo boats. This second squadron was stocked with coal and ammunition in the event that it would need to reinforce the squadron at Smryna.

In 1896, she took part in the annual summer maneuvers in July as part of the First Division of the Reserve Squadron, which also included the ironclads Re Umberto and Lepanto and the protected cruiser Ettore Fieramosca. She remained with the unit the following year, which also included the ironclads Lepanto, Italia, Duilio, Francesco Morosini, and Ruggiero di Lauria, the protected cruisers Lombardia and Calabria, and a pair of torpedo boats. In 1898, Calatafimi was assigned to the Reserve Squadron, which included the ironclads Lepanto, Francesco Morosini, and Ruggiero di Lauria, three protected cruisers, and the torpedo cruiser Goito. The following year, she returned to the Active Squadron, where she served with six ironclads, the armored cruiser Vettor Pisani, the protected cruiser Lombardia, and Goito. The ship was sold for scrap in March 1907 and subsequently broken up.
