= Italian cruiser Caprera =

Torpedo cruiser of the Italian Royal Navy

- Caprera in 1895, shortly after entering service

History

Italy
- Name: Caprera
- Namesake: Caprera
- Builder: Cantiere navale fratelli Orlando
- Laid down: 27 July 1891
- Launched: 6 May 1894
- Commissioned: 12 December 1895
- Fate: Sold for scrap in May 1913

General characteristics
- Class & type: Partenope-class torpedo cruiser
- Displacement: Normal: 833 long tons (846 t)
- Length: 73.1 m (239 ft 10 in)
- Beam: 8.22 m (27 ft)
- Draft: 3.48 m (11 ft 5 in)
- Installed power: 4 × locomotive boilers; 3,884 to 4,422 ihp (2,896 to 3,297 kW)
- Propulsion: 2 × triple-expansion steam engines; 2 × screw propellers
- Speed: 18.1 to 20.8 knots (33.5 to 38.5 km/h; 20.8 to 23.9 mph)
- Range: 1,800 nautical miles (3,300 km; 2,100 mi) at 10 knots (19 km/h; 12 mph)
- Complement: 96–121
- Armament: 2 × 120 mm (4.7 in) gun; 6 × 57 mm (2.24 in) guns; 3 × 37 mm (1.5 in) guns; 5 × 450 mm (17.7 in) torpedo tubes
- Armor: Deck: 1.6 in (41 mm); Conning tower: 1.6 in

Caprera was a torpedo cruiser of the Partenope class built for the Italian Regia Marina (Royal Navy) in the 1880s. She was built by the Cantiere navale fratelli Orlando shipyard; her keel was laid in July 1891, she was launched in May 1894, and was commissioned in December 1895. Her main armament were her five torpedo tubes, which were supported by a battery of eleven small-caliber guns. Caprera spent most of her career in the main Italian fleet, where she was primarily occupied with training exercises. She served in the Red Sea during the Italo-Turkish War of 1911–1912, where she conducted shore bombardments and blockaded Ottoman ports in the area. Caprera did not remain in service long after the war, being sold for scrap in May 1913.

== Design ==
Plan and profile of the Partenope class

The Partenope-class cruisers were derivatives of the earlier, experimental Goito-class cruisers, themselves based on the preceding cruiser Tripoli. The class marked a temporary shift toward the ideas of the Jeune École in Italian naval thinking. The doctrine emphasized the use of small, torpedo-armed craft to destroy expensive ironclads.

Caprera was 73.1 meters (239 ft 10 in) long overall and had a beam of 8.22 m (27 ft) and an average draft of 3.48 m (11 ft 5 in). She displaced 833 long tons (846 t) normally. The ship had a short forecastle deck that terminated at the conning tower. She had a crew of between 96 and 121 personnel.

Her propulsion system consisted of a pair of horizontal triple-expansion steam engines, each driving a single screw propeller. Steam was supplied by four coal-fired locomotive boilers, which were vented through two widely spaced funnels. Specific figures for Caprera's engine performance have not survived, but the ships of her class had top speeds of 18.1 to 20.8 knots (33.5 to 38.5 km/h; 20.8 to 23.9 mph) at 3,884 to 4,422 indicated horsepower (2,896 to 3,297 kW). The ship had a cruising radius of about 1,800 nautical miles (3,300 km; 2,100 mi) at a speed of 10 knots (19 km/h; 12 mph).

Caprera was armed with a main battery of two 120 mm (4.7 in) /40 guns, one placed on the forecastle and the other toward the stern. Close-range defense against torpedo boats was provided by a secondary battery of six 57 mm (2.24 in) /43 guns mounted singly. (Note: "/40" refers to the length of the gun in terms of calibers, meaning that the length of the barrel is 40 times its internal diameter.) She was also equipped with three 37 mm (1.5 in) /20 guns in single mounts. Her primary offensive weapon was her five 450 mm (17.7 in) torpedo tubes. The ship was protected by an armored deck that was up to 1.6 in (41 mm) thick; her conning tower was armored with the same thickness of steel plate.

== Service history ==
Caprera was laid down at the Cantiere navale fratelli Orlando (Orlando Brothers' Shipyard) in Livorno on 27 July 1891, originally under the name Clio. She was renamed Caprera on 23 February 1893 and was launched on 6 May 1894, the last member of her class to enter the water. After fitting-out work was completed, she underwent sea trials in mid-1895. While testing the engines with forced draft, the ship reached 17.75 knots (32.87 km/h; 20.43 mph). The ship was commissioned into the fleet on 12 December 1895. Upon entering service, Caprera was initially stationed in the 2nd Maritime Department, split between Taranto and Naples, along with most of the torpedo cruisers in the Italian fleet. These included her sister ships Partenope, Aretusa, Euridice, Iride, Minerva, and Urania, the four Goito-class cruisers, and Tripoli. Shortly thereafter, she was transferred to Italian East Africa. She departed with the protected cruiser Etna in late December, passing through the Suez Canal on 30 December, along with a transport carrying a battalion of infantry. The rest of the Red Sea Squadron, which included the protected cruisers Dogali and Etruria, met Caprera and Etna in Massawa.

Caprera joined the 2nd Division of the active fleet in 1897, which also included the ironclad Andrea Doria, the armored cruiser Marco Polo, the protected cruisers Etna, Stromboli, and Liguria, and the torpedo cruisers Urania and Partenope. The ship was assigned to the Atlantic Naval Division in 1899, along with Marco Polo and the protected cruisers Etna, Dogali, and Giovanni Bausan. In 1903, Caprera was sent to strengthen the Red Sea Station, which also included the old screw corvette Cristoforo Colombo, the gunboat Volturno, and the aviso Barbarigo. By 1907, Caprera had been transferred to the Reserve Squadron, along with four of the older ironclad battleships. The following year, she was stationed in Italian East Africa. While there, an Italian meteorologist conducted several experiments aboard the ship with a hot air balloon to study the monsoon winds in the region, beginning in Zanzibar. The tests, which were conducted in the last week of July, were unsuccessful, as the weather was unfavorable.

At the start of the Italo-Turkish War in September 1911, Caprera was stationed in Italy, alternating between the ports of La Spezia and Naples, along with her sister ships Urania and Iride. The threat of an Ottoman attack from the Arabian Peninsula across the Red Sea to Italian Eritrea led the Italian High Command to reinforce the Red Sea Squadron. Caprera and several destroyers were sent to strengthen the Italian defenses. The protected cruiser Piemonte and two destroyers annihilated a force of seven Ottoman gunboats in the Battle of Kunfuda Bay on 7 January 1912, wiping out the core of Ottoman naval forces in the area. Caprera and the rest of the Italian ships then commenced a bombardment campaign against the Turkish ports in the Red Sea before declaring a blockade of the city of Al Hudaydah on 26 January. On 27 July and 12 August, Caprera, her sister ship Aretusa, and the protected cruiser Piemonte conducted two bombardments of Al Hudaydah. During the second attack, they destroyed an Ottoman ammunition dump. On 14 October, the Ottoman government agreed to sign a peace treaty, ending the war. Caprera did not remain in service long after the end of the war. She was sold for scrap in May 1913 and thereafter broken up.
