= Italian cruiser Urania =

Torpedo cruiser of the Italian Royal Navy

- Urania shortly after entering service, c. 1893–94

History

Italy
- Name: Urania
- Namesake: Urania
- Builder: Cantieri navali Odero, Genoa
- Laid down: 16 February 1889
- Launched: 18 June 1891
- Commissioned: 21 July 1893
- Fate: Sold for scrapping January 1912

General characteristics
- Class & type: Partenope-class torpedo cruiser
- Displacement: Normal: 931 long tons (946 t)
- Length: 73.1 m (239 ft 10 in)
- Beam: 8.22 m (27 ft)
- Draft: 3.48 m (11 ft 5 in)
- Installed power: 4 × locomotive boilers; 3,884 to 4,422 ihp (2,896 to 3,297 kW)
- Propulsion: 2 × triple-expansion steam engines; 2 × screw propellers
- Speed: 18.1 to 20.8 knots (33.5 to 38.5 km/h; 20.8 to 23.9 mph)
- Range: 1,800 nautical miles (3,300 km; 2,100 mi) at 10 knots (19 km/h; 12 mph)
- Complement: 96–121
- Armament: 1 × 120 mm (4.7 in) gun; 6 × 57 mm (2.24 in) guns; 3 × 37 mm (1.5 in) guns; 6 × 450 mm (17.7 in) torpedo tubes
- Armor: Deck: 1.6 in (41 mm); Conning tower: 1.6 in

Urania was a torpedo cruiser of the Partenope class built for the Italian Regia Marina (Royal Navy) in the 1880s. She was built by the Cantieri navali Odero shipyard; her keel was laid in February 1889, she was launched in June 1891, and was commissioned in July 1893. Her main armament were her six torpedo tubes, which were supported by a battery of ten small-caliber guns. Urania spent most of her career in the main Italian fleet, where she was primarily occupied with training exercises. She was still in service at the outbreak of the Italo-Turkish War in September 1911, but she did not take part in any operations. Instead, she remained in Italian waters and was broken up for scrap in January 1912.

== Design ==
Plan and profile of the Partenope class

The Partenope-class cruisers were derivatives of the earlier, experimental Goito-class cruisers, themselves based on the preceding cruiser Tripoli. The class marked a temporary shift toward the ideas of the Jeune École in Italian naval thinking. The doctrine emphasized the use of small, torpedo-armed craft to destroy expensive ironclads.

Urania was 73.1 meters (239 ft 10 in) long overall and had a beam of 8.22 m (27 ft) and an average draft of 3.48 m (11 ft 5 in). She displaced 931 long tons (946 t) normally. The ship had a short forecastle deck that terminated at the conning tower. She had a crew of between 96 and 121 personnel.

Her propulsion system consisted of a pair of horizontal triple-expansion steam engines, each driving a single screw propeller. Steam was supplied by four coal-fired locomotive boilers, which were vented through two widely spaced funnels. Specific figures for Urania's engine performance have not survived, but the ships of her class had top speeds of 18.1 to 20.8 knots (33.5 to 38.5 km/h; 20.8 to 23.9 mph) at 3,884 to 4,422 indicated horsepower (2,896 to 3,297 kW). The ship had a cruising radius of about 1,800 nautical miles (3,300 km; 2,100 mi) at a speed of 10 knots (19 km/h; 12 mph).

Urania was armed with a main battery of one 120 mm (4.7 in) /40 gun placed on the forecastle. Close-range defense against torpedo boats was provided by a secondary battery of six 57 mm (2.24 in) /43 guns mounted singly. (Note: "/40" refers to the length of the gun in terms of calibers, meaning that the length of the barrel is 40 times its internal diameter.) She was also equipped with three 37 mm (1.5 in) /20 guns in single mounts. Her primary offensive weapon was her six 450 mm (17.7 in) torpedo tubes. The ship was protected by an armored deck that was up to 1.6 in (41 mm) thick; her conning tower was armored with the same thickness of steel plate.

== Service history ==
Urania was laid down on 16 February 1889 at the Cantieri navali Odero (Odero Shipyard) in Genoa, and was launched on 18 June 1891. After fitting-out work was completed, the ship was commissioned into the fleet on 21 July 1893. During the 1893 fleet maneuvers, Urania served with the 2nd Division of the Reserve Squadron, along with the ironclad Castelfidardo, the protected cruiser Stromboli, and four torpedo boats. During the maneuvers, which lasted from 6 August to 5 September, the ships of the Reserve Squadron defended against a simulated attack by the Active Squadron, which gamed a French attack on the Italian fleet. In 1895, Urania was stationed in the 2nd Maritime Department, split between Taranto and Naples, along with most of the torpedo cruisers in the Italian fleet. These included her sister ships Partenope, Aretusa, Euridice, Iride, Minerva, and Caprera, the four Goito-class cruisers, and Tripoli.

The ship was assigned to the 2nd Division of the main fleet in 1897, initially along with the three Ruggiero di Lauria-class ironclads and the protected cruisers Etna and Stromboli. By the June, the unit had been reorganized significantly, consisting of Urania, the ironclad Andrea Doria, the armored cruiser Marco Polo, the protected cruisers Etna, Stromboli, and Liguria, and the torpedo cruisers Caprera and Partenope. In 1899, Urania was assigned to the 2nd Division of the main fleet, which consisted of the ironclads Affondatore, Castelfidardo, and Sicilia and her sister ship Partenope. The 2nd Division was usually kept in reserve, which amounted to three months of active service per year, with the rest of the time spent in harbor with reduced crews. At the start of the Italo-Turkish War in September 1911, Urania was stationed in Italy, alternating between the ports of La Spezia and Naples, along with her sister ships Iride and Caprera. She did not see action during the war. In January 1912, with the war still on-going, the ship was sold for scrap and thereafter broken up.
