= Italian cruiser Minerva =

Torpedo cruiser of the Italian Royal Navy

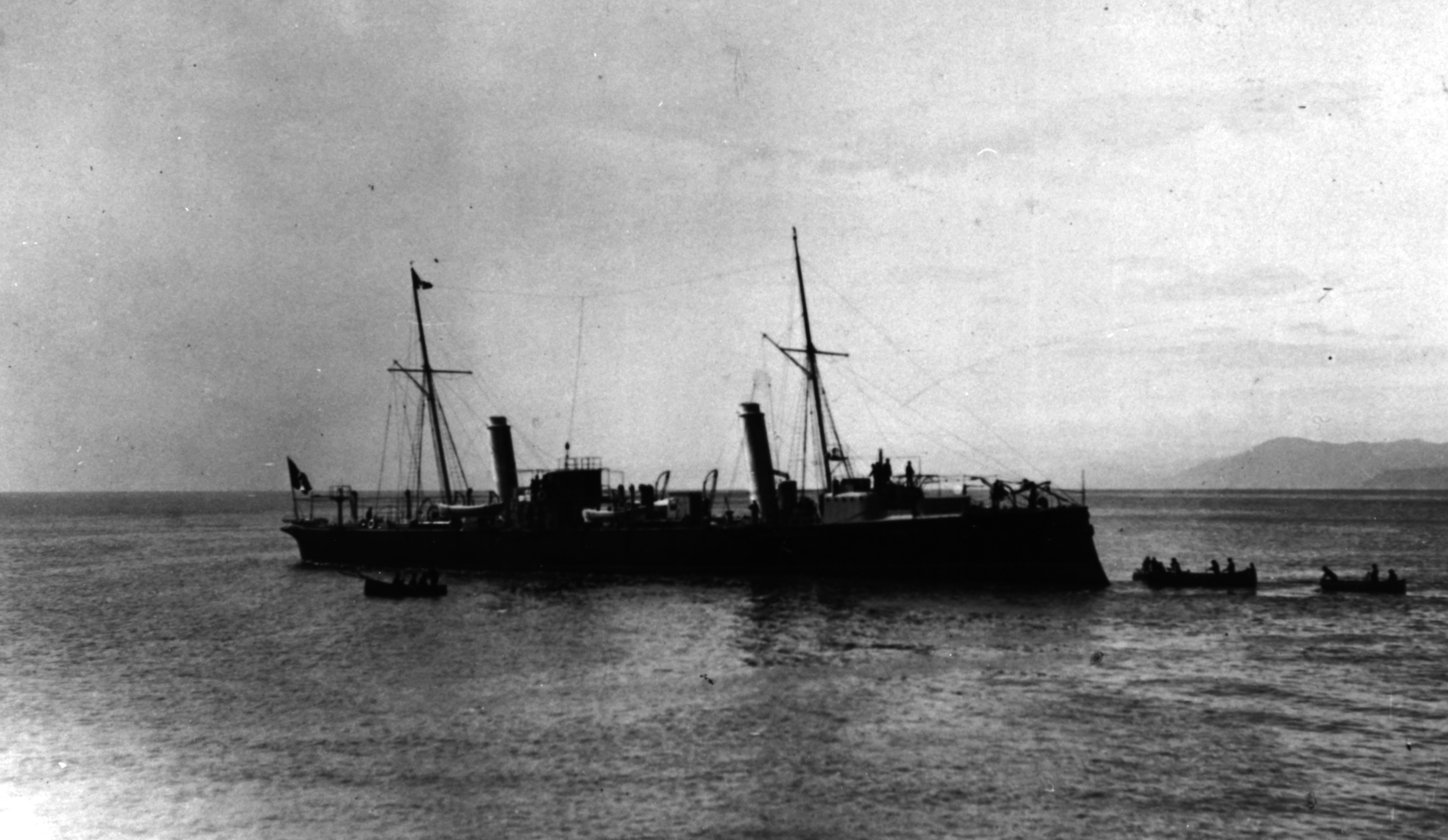
- Minerva shortly after her launching, still incomplete

History

Italy
- Name: Minerva
- Namesake: Minerva
- Builder: Gio. Ansaldo & C., Genoa
- Laid down: 1 February 1889
- Launched: 27 February 1892
- Commissioned: 20 August 1892
- Fate: Scrapped 1921

General characteristics
- Class & type: Partenope-class torpedo cruiser
- Displacement: Normal: 833 long tons (846 t)
- Length: 73.1 m (239 ft 10 in)
- Beam: 8.22 m (27 ft)
- Draft: 3.48 m (11 ft 5 in)
- Installed power: 4 × locomotive boilers; 3,884 to 4,422 ihp (2,896 to 3,297 kW)
- Propulsion: 2 × triple-expansion steam engines; 2 × screw propellers
- Speed: 18.1 to 20.8 knots (33.5 to 38.5 km/h; 20.8 to 23.9 mph)
- Complement: 96–121
- Armament: 1 × 120 mm (4.7 in) gun; 6 × 57 mm (2.24 in) guns; 3 × 37 mm (1.5 in) guns; 6 × 450 mm (18 in) torpedo tubes
- Armor: Deck: 1.6 in (41 mm); Conning tower: 1.6 in

Minerva was a torpedo cruiser of the Partenope class built for the Italian Regia Marina (Royal Navy) in the 1880s. The second of eight ships, Minerva was built by Gio. Ansaldo & C.; her keel was laid down in February 1889, she was launched in February 1892, and she was commissioned in August that year. Her main armament were her five torpedo tubes, which were supported by a battery of ten small-caliber guns. Minerva spent most of her career in the main Italian fleet, where she was primarily occupied with training exercises. She was converted into a minelayer in 1909–1910. She did not see significant action during the Italo-Turkish War in 1911 or World War I in 1915–1918, though she was used to lay defensive minefields during the latter conflict. The ship was sold for scrap in 1921.

== Design ==
Plan and profile of the Partenope class

The Partenope-class cruisers were derivatives of the earlier, experimental Goito-class cruisers, themselves based on the preceding cruiser Tripoli. The class marked a temporary shift toward the ideas of the Jeune École in Italian naval thinking. The doctrine emphasized the use of small, torpedo-armed craft to destroy expensive ironclads.

Minerva was 73.1 meters (239 ft 10 in) long overall and had a beam of 8.22 m (27 ft) and an average draft of 3.48 m (11 ft 5 in). She displaced 833 long tons (846 t) normally. The ship had a short forecastle deck that terminated at the conning tower. She had a crew of between 96 and 121 personnel.

Her propulsion system consisted of a pair of horizontal triple-expansion steam engines each driving a single screw propeller. Steam was supplied by four coal-fired locomotive boilers, which were vented through two widely spaced funnels. On speed trials with a displacement of 828 long tons (841 t), Minerva's engines produced an average top speed of 19 knots (35 km/h; 22 mph) from 3,884 indicated horsepower (2,896 kW) with forced draft. The ship had a cruising radius of about 1,800 nautical miles (3,300 km; 2,100 mi) at a speed of 10 knots (19 km/h; 12 mph).

Minerva was armed with a main battery of one 120 mm (4.7 in) /40 gun placed on the forecastle. Close-range defense against torpedo boats was provided by a secondary battery of six 57 mm (2.24 in) /43 guns mounted singly. (Note: "/40" refers to the length of the gun in terms of calibers, meaning that the length of the barrel is 40 times its internal diameter.) She was also equipped with three 37 mm (1.5 in) /20 guns in single mounts. Her primary offensive weapon was her six 450 mm (18 in) torpedo tubes. The ship was protected by an armored deck that was up to 1.6 in (41 mm) thick; her conning tower was armored with the same thickness of steel plate.

== Service history ==
Minerva was laid down on 1 February 1889 at the Gio. Ansaldo & C. shipyard in Genoa, and was launched on 27 February 1892. After fitting-out work was completed less than six months later, the ship was commissioned into the fleet on 20 August. During the 1893 fleet maneuvers, Minerva served with the 1st Division of the Reserve Squadron, along with the ironclads Re Umberto and Duilio and four torpedo boats. During the maneuvers, which lasted from 6 August to 5 September, the ships of the Reserve Squadron defended against a simulated attack by the Active Squadron, which gamed a French attack on the Italian fleet. In 1895, Minerva was stationed in the 2nd Maritime Department, split between Taranto and Naples, along with most of the torpedo cruisers in the Italian fleet. These included her sister ships Partenope, Aretusa, Euridice, Iride, Urania, and Caprera, the four Goito-class cruisers, and Tripoli.

Minerva served in the active squadron in 1902. In 1903, Minerva was assigned to the 1st Squadron, along with Euridice. The unit also included eight battleships, six other cruisers, and six destroyers. The 1st Squadron was kept in active service for seven months of the year for training, and had reduced crews for the remainder of the year. She remained in the squadron the following year, which was reduced in size, with the two oldest battleships having been withdrawn, though three destroyers were added. Between 1909 and 1910, the ship was modernized and converted into a minelayer. She received new oil-fired boilers and had her armament reduced to two 3 in (76 mm) guns, four 57 mm guns and two 37 mm guns. Minerva's speed was reduced to 18.28 knots (33.85 km/h; 21.04 mph) on 3,524 ihp (2,628 kW). At the start of the Italo-Turkish War in September 1911, Minerva was attached to the 4th Division of the 2nd Squadron of the Italian fleet. By this time, she was being used as a minelayer. She did not see significant action during the war.

Italy had declared neutrality at the start of World War I, but by July 1915, the Triple Entente had convinced the Italians to enter the war against the Central Powers. Admiral Paolo Thaon di Revel, the Italian naval chief of staff, believed that the threat from Austro-Hungarian submarines and naval mines in the narrow waters of the Adriatic was too serious for him to use the fleet in an active way. Instead, Revel decided to implement a blockade at the relatively safer southern end of the Adriatic with the main fleet, while smaller vessels, such as the MAS boats, conducted raids on Austro-Hungarian ships and installations. Minerva was initially used to lay a series of defensive minefields, along with her sister Partenope and the cruiser Goito, in support of this strategy. Minerva survived the war and was discarded in May 1921, the last surviving member of her class. She was subsequently broken up for scrap.
