= Italian ship Partenope =

Partenope was the name of at least two ships of the Italian Navy and may refer to:

- Italian cruiser Partenope, a Partenope-class cruiser launched in 1889 and sunk in 1918
- Italian torpedo boat Partenope, a Spica-class torpedo boat launched in 1937 and scuttled in 1943
