= Italian ship Calatafimi =

Calatafimi was the name of at least two ships of the Italian Navy and may refer to:

- Italian cruiser Calatafimi, a Partenope-class cruiser launched in 1893 and sold for scrap in 1907
- Italian destroyer Calatafimi, a Curtatone-class destroyer launched in 1923. Seized by Germany in 1943 being renamed TA19 and sunk in 1944
