= Partenope-class cruiser =

Torpedo cruiser class of the Italian Royal Navy

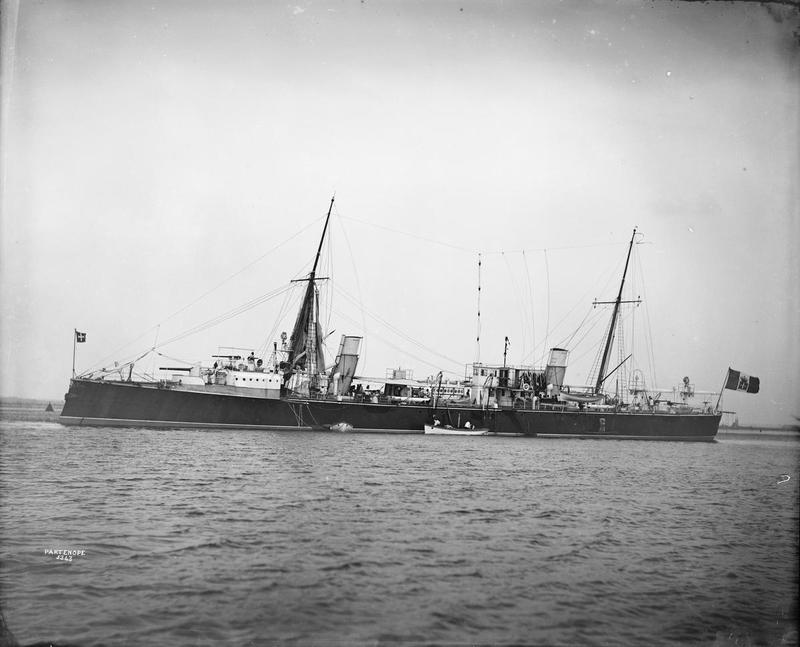
- Partenope c. 1895

Class overview
- Name: Partenope-class
- Builders: Cantiere navale fratelli Orlando; Cantieri navali Odero; Gio. Ansaldo & C.; R C di Castellammare di Stabia
- Operators: Regia Marina
- Preceded by: Folgore class
- Succeeded by: Agordat class
- Built: 1888–1894
- In commission: 1890–1921
- Completed: 8
- Lost: 1
- Scrapped: 7

General characteristics
- Type: Torpedo cruiser
- Displacement: Normal: 821 long tons (834 t)
- Length: 73.1 m (239 ft 10 in)
- Beam: 8.22 m (27 ft)
- Draft: 3.48 m (11 ft 5 in)
- Installed power: 4 × locomotive boilers; 3,884 to 4,422 ihp (2,896 to 3,297 kW)
- Propulsion: 2 × triple-expansion steam engines; 2 × screw propellers
- Speed: 18.1 to 20.8 knots (33.5 to 38.5 km/h; 20.8 to 23.9 mph)
- Complement: 96–121
- Armament: 1 × 120 mm (4.7 in) gun; 6 × 57 mm (2.24 in) guns; 3 × 37 mm (1.5 in) guns; 5 × 450 mm (17.7 in) torpedo tubes
- Armor: Deck: 1.6 in (41 mm); Conning tower: 1.6 in

The Partenope class was a group of eight torpedo cruisers built for the Italian Regia Marina (Royal Navy) in the 1880s and 1890s. The class comprised Partenope, Minerva, Euridice, Urania, Iride, Aretusa, Caprera, and Calatafimi. Based on the earlier cruiser Tripoli, the Partenope class represented a temporary embrace of the Jeune École, which emphasized the use of cheap torpedo-armed vessels as a means to defeat the much more expensive ironclad battleships of the day. To fulfill their intended role, the vessels were armed with five or six 450 mm (17.7 in) torpedo tubes.

The ships of the class primarily served in the main Italian fleet throughout their careers. Their time with the fleet was spent conducting training exercises, along with occasional travels to foreign countries. In late 1900s, Partenope and Minerva were converted into minelayers and Euridice and Calatafimi were sold for scrap. Several of the vessels saw action during the Italo-Turkish War of 1911–1912, primarily conducting shore bombardments in North Africa and the Arabian Peninsula. Three more vessels—Urania, Aretusa, and Caprera—were sold in the later stages of the war or shortly thereafter. Partenope laid minefields in the Adriatic Sea after Italy entered World War I in 1915, and was later sunk by a German U-boat in March 1918. Minerva and Iride survived the war and were sold for scrap in 1921 and 1920, respectively.

== Design ==
The design for the Partenope class was prepared by Engineering Inspector Carlo Vigna, and was based on the earlier torpedo cruiser Tripoli, the first modern vessel of the type built by Italy. The development of torpedo cruisers in Italy in the mid-1880s represented a shift away from the emphasis on large capital ships that had been built for the previous decade and toward the ideas of the Jeune École, which emphasized small, fast, torpedo-armed vessels that could damage or destroy the much larger battleships at a fraction of the cost. The Partenope class were followed by the Agordat class, the last class of torpedo cruisers built by Italy.

=== General characteristics and machinery ===
Urania shortly after entering service

The ships of the Partenope class were 70 meters (230 ft) long between perpendiculars and 73.1 m (239 ft 10 in) long overall. They had a beam of 8.22 m (27 ft) and an average draft of 3.48 m (11 ft 5 in). They displaced from 821 to 931 long tons (834 to 946 t) normally. Their hulls were steel-built and had a ram bow. The ships had forecastle that ran the first third of the ships' length, thereafter stepping down to the main deck that extended for the rest of their length. The forward conning tower was erected atop the forecastle, and a smaller, secondary conning tower was located further aft. The ships had a crew that ranged from 96 to 121.

Their propulsion system consisted of a pair of horizontal triple-expansion steam engines, each driving a single screw propeller. Steam was supplied by four coal-fired locomotive boilers that were trunked into two widely spaced funnels. They were initially fitted with a fore and aft sailing rig with two masts to supplement the steam engines on longer voyages, but the rigging was later removed.

Specific figures for each ship's engine performance have not survived, but the ships of the class had top speeds of 18.1 to 20.8 knots (33.5 to 38.5 km/h; 20.8 to 23.9 mph) from 3,884 to 4,422 indicated horsepower (2,896 to 3,297 kW). Coal storage amounted to 180 long tons (180 t), which provided a cruising radius of about 1,800 nautical miles (3,300 km; 2,100 mi) at a speed of 10 knots (19 km/h; 12 mph).

=== Armament and armor ===
Plan and profile of the Partenope class

The Partenope-class cruisers, with the exception of Caprera, were armed with a main battery of one 120 mm (4.7 in) 40-caliber (cal.) gun that was carried in a single pivot mount on the forecastle. Defense against torpedo boats was provided by a secondary battery of six 57 mm (2.24 in) 43-cal. guns mounted singly. They were also equipped with three 37 mm (1.5 in) 20-cal. guns in single mounts. Caprera instead had two 120 mm guns, four 57 mm guns, and two of the 37 mm weapons. Caprera's second 120 mm gun was placed at the stern. The ships' primary offensive weapon was their 450 mm (17.7 in) torpedo tubes; Partenope and Caprera had five tubes, while the rest of the class had six.

The ships were protected by a curved armored deck that was up to 1.6 in (41 mm) thick; the deck was flat over the longitudinal center and sloped down at the sides to connect to the outer hull plating. Their forward conning towers were armored with the same thickness of steel plate on the sides.

=== Modifications ===
All eight ships had their sailing rig replaced with a pair of light pole masts. Partenope and Minerva were reboilered in 1906–1908 and 1909–1910, respectively, with new oil-fired models. Partenope's performance after the refit was 17.05 knots (31.58 km/h; 19.62 mph) from 2,481 ihp (1,850 kW), while Minerva was faster, at 18.28 knots (33.85 km/h; 21.04 mph) from 3,524 ihp (2,628 kW). During their refits in the late 1900s, Partenope and Minerva were converted into minelayers. Their armament was revised significantly, and now consisted of a pair of 3 in (76 mm) guns, four 57 mm guns, and two 37 mm guns. Partenope's forecastle was completely rebuilt, significantly increasing her freeboard. Partenope was equipped to carry sixty naval mines, with a bank of thirty mines on a platform on each side of the ship; the details of Minerva's mine handling equipment and storage are unknown.

== Ships ==
Caprera soon after entering service

Construction data
Name	Builder	Laid down	Launched	Completed
Partenope	Regio Cantiere di Castellammare di Stabia, Castellammare di Stabia	8 June 1888	23 December 1889	11 September 1890
Minerva	Gio. Ansaldo & C., Genoa	1 February 1889	27 February 1892	20 August 1892
Euridice	Regio Cantiere di Castellammare di Stabia	14 February 1889	22 September 1890	1 May 1891
Urania	Cantieri navali Odero, Genoa	16 February 1889	18 June 1891	21 July 1893
Iride	Regio Cantiere di Castellammare di Stabia	21 February 1889	20 July 1891	1 November 1892
Aretusa	Cantiere navale fratelli Orlando, Livorno	1 June 1889	14 March 1891	1 September 1892
Caprera	Cantiere navale fratelli Orlando, Livorno	27 July 1891	6 May 1894	12 December 1895
Calatafimi	Cantiere navale fratelli Orlando, Livorno	15 September 1891	18 March 1893	16 January 1894

== Service history ==
Iride, probably in the late 1890s

For much of the ships' careers, they were assigned to the main Italian fleet, where they were frequently occupied with conducting training exercises. These exercises frequently gamed attacks by the French fleet, such as the maneuvers conducted in 1893, which simulated a French attack on Naples. In 1895, Partenope joined a squadron that visited Great Britain, and later that year took part in an international naval demonstration off Crete in an attempt to defuse tensions between Greece and the Ottoman Empire. Euridice took part in a similar demonstration, again off Crete, in 1897; this was a reaction to the Greco-Turkish War that had broken out that year. Between 1906 and 1908, Partenope was converted into a minelayer, and Minerva underwent a similar conversion in 1909–1910. Two ships, Calatafimi and Euridice, were discarded in early 1907.

During the Italo-Turkish War, Partenope operated off Libya, bombarding Ottoman troops and supporting Italian forces. Iride escorted a troopship convoy to North Africa and then conducted shore bombardments. Aretusa was stationed in the Red Sea at the outbreak of the war, and she briefly engaged the Ottoman cruiser Peyk-i Şevket. Aretusa, joined by Caprera in early 1912, thereafter participated in bombardment and blockade operations against Ottoman ports in the area. Minerva was assigned to the 4th Division at the time, but did not see action during the war. Three more members of the class were sold for scrap after the end of the war, with Urania and Aretusa being stricken in 1912 and Caprera being discarded in early 1913.

Partenope and Minerva laid a series of defensive minefields in the Adriatic Sea after Italy entered World War I in 1915. They did not see action for much of the rest of the war, owing to the cautious strategies adopted by Italy and its enemy across the Adriatic, Austria-Hungary. On 24 March 1918, the German U-boat UC-67 torpedoed and sank Partenope north of Bizerte, Tunisia. Iride and Minerva survived the war and were discarded in December 1920 and May 1921, respectively.
