= Italian cruiser Euridice =

Torpedo cruiser of the Italian Royal Navy

- Euridice in the late 1890s

History

Italy
- Name: Euridice
- Namesake: Eurydice
- Laid down: 14 February 1889
- Launched: 22 September 1890
- Commissioned: 1 May 1891
- Fate: Sold for scrapping in March 1907

General characteristics
- Class & type: Partenope-class torpedo cruiser
- Displacement: Normal: 904 long tons (919 t)
- Length: 73.1 m (239 ft 10 in)
- Beam: 8.22 m (27 ft)
- Draft: 3.48 m (11 ft 5 in)
- Installed power: 4 × locomotive boilers; 3,884 to 4,422 ihp (2,896 to 3,297 kW)
- Propulsion: 2 × triple-expansion steam engines; 2 × screw propellers
- Speed: 18.1 to 20.8 knots (33.5 to 38.5 km/h; 20.8 to 23.9 mph)
- Range: 1,800 nautical miles (3,300 km; 2,100 mi) at 10 knots (19 km/h; 12 mph)
- Complement: 96–121
- Armament: 1 × 120 mm (4.7 in) gun; 6 × 57 mm (2.24 in) guns; 3 × 37 mm (1.5 in) guns; 6 × 450 mm (17.7 in) torpedo tubes
- Armor: Deck: 1.6 in (41 mm); Conning tower: 1.6 in

Euridice was a torpedo cruiser of the Partenope class built for the Italian Regia Marina (Royal Navy) in the 1880s. She was built by the Regio Cantiere di Castellammare di Stabia shipyard, with her keel laying in February 1889, her launching in September 1890, and her commissioning in May 1891. Her main armament was her six torpedo tubes, which were supported by a battery of ten small-caliber guns. Euridice spent most of her career in the main Italian fleet, where she was primarily occupied with training exercises. She was withdrawn from service in 1907 and sold for scrapping.

== Design ==
Plan and profile of the Partenope class

The Partenope-class cruisers were derivatives of the earlier, experimental Goito-class cruisers, themselves based on the preceding cruiser Tripoli. The class marked a temporary shift toward the ideas of the Jeune École in Italian naval thinking. The doctrine emphasized the use of small, torpedo-armed craft to destroy expensive ironclads.

Euridice was 73.1 meters (239 ft 10 in) long overall and had a beam of 8.22 m (27 ft) and an average draft of 3.48 m (11 ft 5 in). She displaced 904 long tons (919 t) normally. The ship had a short forecastle deck that terminated at the conning tower. She had a crew of between 96 and 121 personnel.

Her propulsion system consisted of a pair of horizontal triple-expansion steam engines, each driving a single screw propeller. Steam was supplied by four coal-fired locomotive boilers, which were vented through two widely spaced funnels. Specific figures for Euridice's engine performance have not survived, but the ships of her class had top speeds of 18.1 to 20.8 knots (33.5 to 38.5 km/h; 20.8 to 23.9 mph) at 3,884 to 4,422 indicated horsepower (2,896 to 3,297 kW). The ship had a cruising radius of about 1,800 nautical miles (3,300 km; 2,100 mi) at a speed of 10 knots (19 km/h; 12 mph).

Euridice was armed with a main battery of one 120 mm (4.7 in) /40 gun placed on the forecastle. Close-range defense against torpedo boats was provided by a secondary battery of six 57 mm (2.24 in) /43 guns mounted singly. (Note: "/40" refers to the length of the gun in terms of calibers, meaning that the length of the barrel is 40 times its internal diameter.) She was also equipped with three 37 mm (1.5 in) /20 guns in single mounts. Her primary offensive weapon was her six 450 mm (17.7 in) torpedo tubes. The ship was protected by an armored deck that was up to 1.6 in (41 mm) thick; her conning tower was armored with the same thickness of steel plate.

== Service history ==
The keel for Euridice was laid down on 14 February 1889 at the Regio Cantiere di Castellammare di Stabia (Royal Dockyard in Castellammare di Stabia). The completed hull was launched on 22 September 1890. After fitting-out work was completed, the ship was commissioned into the fleet on 1 May 1891. Euridice took part in the annual fleet exercises in 1893 in the "attacking squadron", which also included six ironclads, her sister ship Iride and the torpedo cruisers Goito and Monzambano. During the maneuvers, which lasted from 6 August to 5 September, the ships of the Active Squadron simulated a French attack on the Italian fleet. Beginning on 14 October 1894, the Italian fleet, including Euridice, assembled in Genoa for a naval review held in honor of King Umberto I at the commissioning of the new ironclad Re Umberto. The festivities lasted three days.

In 1895, she was assigned to the 2nd Division of the Permanent Squadron, which included her sister ship Calatafimi, the ironclad battleship Francesco Morosini, and the protected cruiser Etruria. The Squadron was based at La Spezia at the time, though Euridice was stationed primarily in Taranto and Naples, along with most of the other torpedo cruisers of the Italian fleet. In 1896, she took part in the annual summer maneuvers in July as part of the Second Division of the Reserve Squadron, which also included the ironclads Italia and Ruggiero di Lauria and the protected cruiser Stromboli.

In February 1897, Euridice deployed to Crete to serve in the International Squadron, a multinational force made up of ships of the Austro-Hungarian Navy, French Navy, Imperial German Navy, Regia Marina, Imperial Russian Navy, and British Royal Navy that intervened in the 1897–1898 Greek uprising on Crete against rule by the Ottoman Empire. She arrived as part of an Italian division that also included the ironclads Sicilia (flagship of the division's commander, Vice Admiral Felice Napoleone Canevaro) and Re Umberto and the protected cruiser Vesuvio. At the time, she was assigned to the 1st Division, which included the three Re Umberto class ironclads, Vesuvio, and the protected cruiser Giovanni Bausan.

Euridice served in the active squadron in 1902. In 1903, Euridice was assigned to the 1st Squadron, along with her sister Minerva. The unit also included eight battleships, six other cruisers, and six destroyers. The 1st Squadron was kept in active service for seven months of the year for training and had reduced crews for the remainder of the year. The ship was sold for scrap in March 1907 and subsequently broken up.
