= Italian cruiser Partenope =

Torpedo cruiser of the Italian Royal Navy

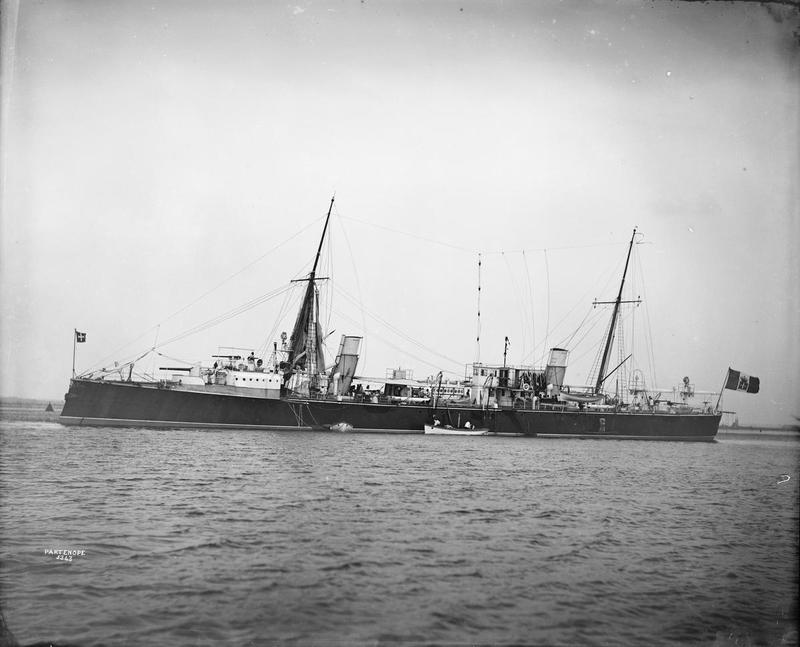
- Partenope c. 1895

History

Italy
- Name: Partenope
- Namesake: Parthenope
- Owner: Regia Marina
- Builder: Regio Cantiere di Castellammare di Stabia
- Laid down: 8 June 1888
- Launched: 23 December 1889
- Commissioned: 11 September 1890
- Fate: Sunk, 24 March 1918

General characteristics
- Class & type: Partenope-class torpedo cruiser
- Displacement: Normal: 821 long tons (834 t)
- Length: 73.1 m (239 ft 10 in)
- Beam: 8.22 m (27 ft)
- Draft: 3.48 m (11 ft 5 in)
- Installed power: 4 × locomotive boilers; 3,884 to 4,422 ihp (2,896 to 3,297 kW)
- Propulsion: 2 × triple-expansion steam engines; 2 × screw propellers
- Speed: 18.1 to 20.8 knots (33.5 to 38.5 km/h; 20.8 to 23.9 mph)
- Complement: 96–121
- Armament: 1 × 120 mm (4.7 in) gun; 6 × 57 mm (2.24 in) guns; 3 × 37 mm (1.5 in) guns; 5 × 450 mm (18 in) torpedo tubes
- Armor: Deck: 1.6 in (41 mm); Conning tower: 1.6 in

Partenope was a torpedo cruiser built for the Italian Regia Marina (Royal Navy) in the 1880s, the lead ship of her class, which included seven other vessels. The ship was built by the Regio Cantiere di Castellammare di Stabia; she was laid down in June 1888, was launched in December 1889, and was completed in September 1890. Her main armament were her five torpedo tubes, which were supported by a battery of ten small-caliber guns.

Partenope spent most of her career in the main Italian fleet, where she was primarily occupied with training exercises. In 1906–1908, she was converted into a minelayer, losing her torpedo tubes. During the Italo-Turkish War of 1911–1912, she provided gunfire support to Italian forces in Libya. She was used to lay a series of minefields in the Adriatic Sea after Italy entered World War I in 1915. In March 1918, Partenope was torpedoed and sunk by the German submarine UC-67 off Bizerte.

== Design ==
Plan and profile of the Partenope class

The Partenope-class cruisers were derivatives of the earlier, experimental Goito-class cruisers, themselves based on the preceding cruiser Tripoli. The class marked a temporary shift toward the ideas of the Jeune École in Italian naval thinking. The doctrine emphasized the use of small, torpedo-armed craft to destroy expensive ironclads.

Partenope was 73.1 meters (239 ft 10 in) long overall and had a beam of 8.22 m (27 ft) and an average draft of 3.48 m (11 ft 5 in). She displaced 821 long tons (834 t) normally. The ship had a short forecastle deck that terminated at the conning tower. She had a crew of between 96 and 121 personnel.

Her propulsion system consisted of a pair of horizontal triple-expansion steam engines each driving a single screw propeller. Steam was supplied by four coal-fired locomotive boilers, which were vented through two widely spaced funnels. Specific figures for Partenope's engine performance have not survived, but the ships of her class had top speeds of 18.1 to 20.8 knots (33.5 to 38.5 km/h; 20.8 to 23.9 mph) at 3,884 to 4,422 indicated horsepower (2,896 to 3,297 kW). The ship had a cruising radius of about 1,800 nautical miles (3,300 km; 2,100 mi) at a speed of 10 knots (19 km/h; 12 mph).

Partenope was armed with a main battery of one 120 mm (4.7 in) /40 gun placed on the forecastle. Close-range defense against torpedo boats was provided by a secondary battery of six 57 mm (2.24 in) /43 guns mounted singly. (Note: "/40" refers to the length of the gun in terms of calibers, meaning that the length of the barrel is 40 times its internal diameter.) She was also equipped with three 37 mm (1.5 in) /20 guns in single mounts. Her primary offensive weapon was her five 450 mm (17.7 in) torpedo tubes. The ship was protected by an armored deck that was up to 1.6 in (41 mm) thick; her conning tower was armored with the same thickness of steel plate.

== Service history ==
Partenope was laid down on 8 June 1888 at the Regio Cantiere di Castellammare di Stabia (Royal Dockyard in Castellammare di Stabia), and was launched on 23 December 1889. After fitting-out work was completed, the ship was commissioned into the fleet on 11 September 1890. Throughout the first decade of her career, Partenope primarily served with the main Italian fleet in the 2nd Division, which was usually kept in reserve. The reserve ships were typically only kept in service for three months of the year for annual training maneuvers, while the 1st Division was on active status for nine months per year.

In 1893, Partenope was assigned to the 2nd Division of the Italian fleet, along with the ironclad Enrico Dandolo and the protected cruiser Vesuvio. By 1895, the 2nd Division consisted of the ironclads Sardegna and Ruggiero di Lauria, along with Partenope. Partenope joined the ironclads Re Umberto, Sardegna, Ruggiero di Lauria, and Andrea Doria and the cruisers Stromboli and Etruria for a visit to Spithead in the United Kingdom in July 1895. All of the ships, save Sardegna and Ruggiero di Lauria, joined an international naval demonstration in late 1895 off Crete during a period of tension between Greece and the Ottoman Empire that culminated in the Greco-Turkish War. Partenope joined the 2nd Division of the active fleet in 1897, which also included Andrea Doria, the armored cruiser Marco Polo, the protected cruisers Etna, Stromboli, and Liguria, and the torpedo cruiser Urania and Caprera. By 1899, the division consisted of the ironclads Affondatore, Castelfidardo, and Sicilia and her sister ship Urania in addition to Partenope. During 1901, Partenope was joined by the ironclads Enrico Dandolo, Andrea Doria, and Francesco Morosini, the armored cruiser Carlo Alberto, and three torpedo boats.

By 1904, the Italian fleet had expanded enough to increase the 1st Division to the 1st Squadron; this unit spent seven months in commission for training and five in reserve. Partenope was transferred to the new unit, along with her sister Minerva. The 1st Squadron included six battleships, four other cruisers, and nine destroyers. Between 1906 and 1908, the ship was modernized and converted into a minelayer. She received new oil-fired boilers and had her armament reduced to two 3 in (76 mm) guns, four 57 mm guns and two 37 mm guns. Partenope's speed was reduced to 17.05 knots (31.58 km/h; 19.62 mph) on 2,481 ihp (1,850 kW). The ship was now equipped to carry sixty naval mines, with a bank of thirty mines on a platform on each side of the ship.

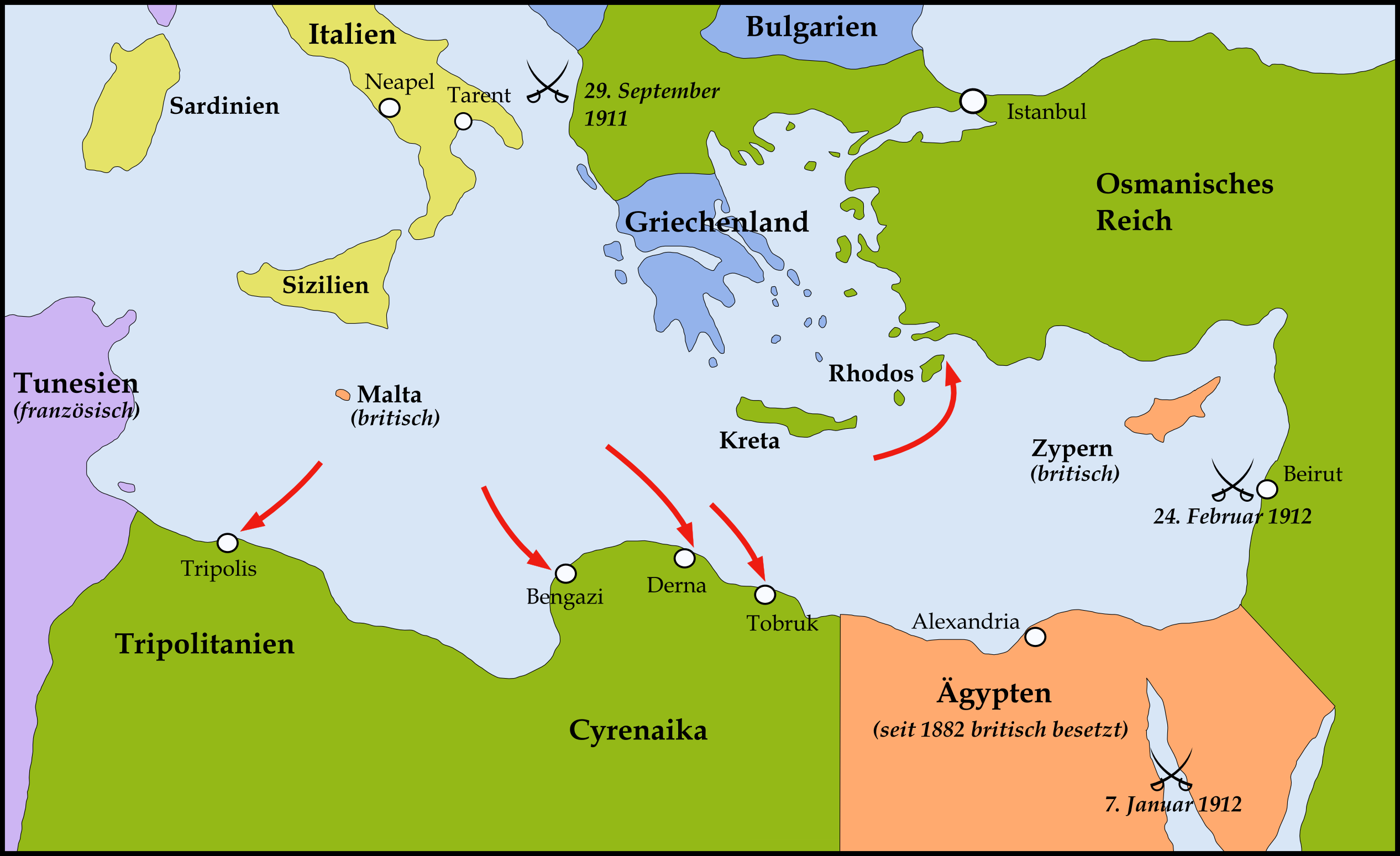
Map of Italian operations during the Italo-Turkish War; Partenope primarily operated off Tripoli in the west

At the start of the Italo-Turkish War in September 1911, Partenope was attached to the 2nd Division of the 1st Squadron of the Italian fleet. By this time, she was being used as a minelayer. On 9 November, she, the armored cruiser Carlo Alberto, the protected cruiser Liguria, and the torpedo boat Cigno provided critical gunfire support that broke a series of Ottoman attacks on the city of Tripoli. A month later, Partenope, Liguria, and the torpedo boats Dardo and Euro conducted a series of bombardments on the ports of Zuwarah, Misrata, and Argub. Partenope then returned to Tripoli, where she continued providing gunfire support to the defending Italian garrison there. She and the ironclads Sardegna and Re Umberto bombarded the oasis at Taguira, though no Turkish forces were present. The Italians then sent a garrison to protect the oasis.

Italy had declared neutrality at the start of World War I, but by July 1915, the Triple Entente had convinced the Italians to enter the war against the Central Powers. Admiral Paolo Thaon di Revel, the Italian naval chief of staff, believed that the threat from Austro-Hungarian submarines and naval mines in the narrow waters of the Adriatic was too serious for him to use the fleet in an active way. Instead, Revel decided to implement a blockade at the relatively safer southern end of the Adriatic with the main fleet, while smaller vessels, such as the MAS boats, conducted raids on Austro-Hungarian ships and installations. Partenope was initially used to lay a series of defensive minefields, along with her sister Minerva and the cruiser Goito, in support of this strategy. On 24 March 1918, the German U-boat UC-67 torpedoed and sank Partenope north of Bizerte, Tunisia, at coordinates 37°53′N 10°10′E.
