= Italian ironclad Sicilia =

Ironclad warship of the Italian Royal Navy

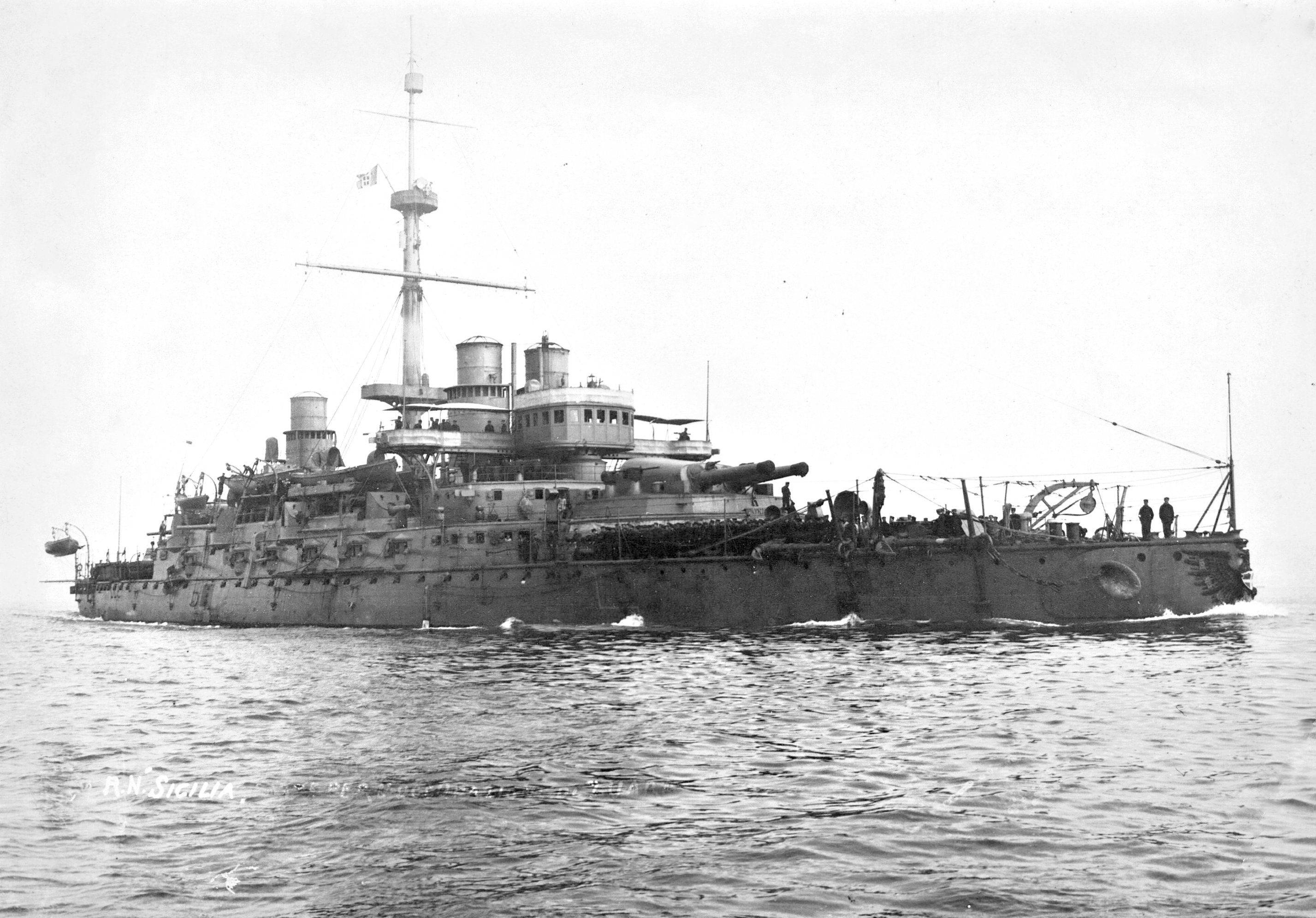
- Sicilia

History

Italy
- Name: Sicilia
- Namesake: Sicily
- Builder: Venetian Arsenal
- Laid down: 3 November 1884
- Launched: 6 June 1891
- Completed: 4 May 1895
- Stricken: 9 July 1914
- Fate: Stricken 1923

General characteristics
- Class & type: Re Umberto-class ironclad
- Displacement: Normal: 13,058 long tons (13,268 t); Full load: 14,842 long tons (15,080 t)
- Length: 127.6 m (418 ft 7.5 in)
- Beam: 23.4 m (76 ft 10.5 in)
- Draft: 8.8 m (28 ft 11.5 in)
- Installed power: 19,131 ihp (14,266 kW); 18 × fire-tube boilers
- Propulsion: 2 × compound steam engines; 2 × screw propellers
- Speed: 20.1 knots (37.2 km/h; 23.1 mph)
- Range: 4,000–6,000 nmi (7,408–11,112 km) at 10 knots (19 km/h; 12 mph)
- Complement: 736
- Armament: 4 × 343 mm (13.5 in) guns; 8 × 152 mm (6 in) guns; 16 × 120 mm (4.7 in) guns; 20 × 57 mm (2.24 in) six-pounder guns; 10 × 37 mm (1.5 in) guns; 5 × 450 mm (17.7 in) torpedo tubes
- Armor: Belt and side: 102 mm (4 in); Deck: 76.2 mm (3 in); Barbettes: 349 mm (13.75 in); Conning tower: 302 mm (11.88 in)

Sicilia was the second of three Re Umberto-class ironclad battleships built for the Italian Regia Marina (Royal Navy). The ship, named for the island of Sicily, was laid down in Venice in November 1884, launched in July 1891, and completed in May 1895. She was armed with a main battery of four 343 mm (13.5 in) guns and had a top speed of 20.3 knots (37.6 km/h; 23.4 mph), though this high speed came at the cost of armor protection.

Sicilia spent the first decade of her career in the Active Squadron of the Italian fleet. Thereafter, she was transferred to the Reserve Squadron, and by 1911, she was part of the Training Division. She took part in the Italo-Turkish War of 1911–1912, where she escorted convoys to North Africa and supported Italian forces ashore by bombarding Ottoman troops. She was thereafter used as a depot ship for the new dreadnought battleship Giulio Cesare. During World War I, she continued in service as a depot ship, and later in the war she was converted into a repair ship. Sicilia was stricken in 1923 and subsequently broken up for scrap.

== Design ==
The Italian Regia Marina embarked on a major construction program in the mid-1870s that included ten modern ironclad battleships, which gave Italy the third largest battle fleet in the world, behind only Great Britain and France. The previous designs—the Duilio, Italia, and Ruggiero di Lauriaes—carried their main battery in an en echelon arrangement, while the new Re Umberto class adopted a fore-and-aft arrangement that maximized firing arcs.

=== Characteristics ===
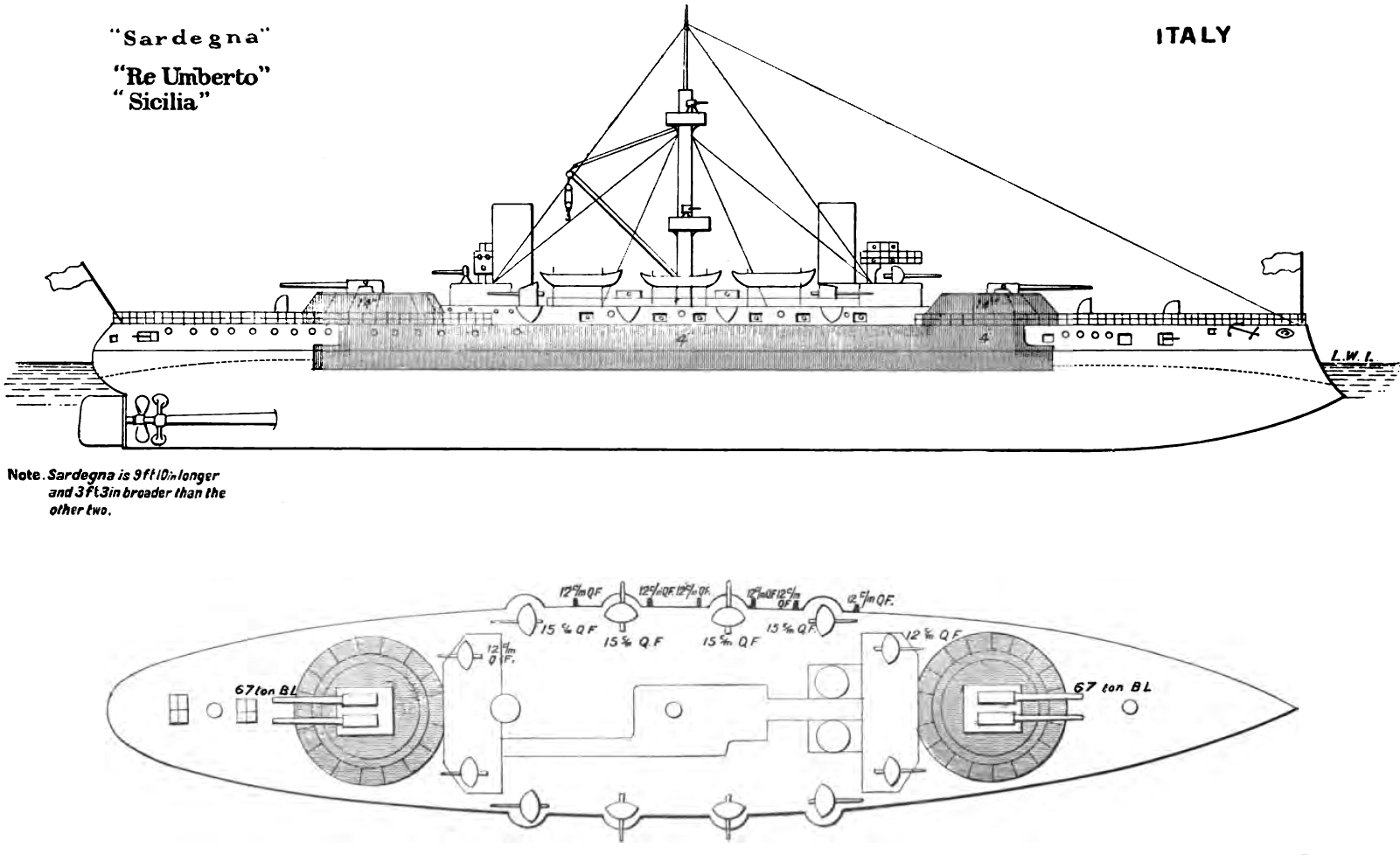
Line-drawing of the Re Umberto class

Sicilia was 127.6 meters (419 ft) long overall; she had a beam of 23.44 m (76.9 ft) and an average draft of 8.83 m (29.0 ft). She displaced 13,058 long tons (13,268 t) normally and up to 14,842 long tons (15,080 t) at full load. The ship had an inverted bow with a ram below the waterline. She was fitted with a single military mast located amidships, which had fighting tops for some of the light guns. The ship's superstructure included a conning tower forward and a secondary conning tower further aft. She had a crew of 736 officers and men.

Her propulsion system consisted of a pair of vertical compound steam engines each driving a single screw propeller, with steam supplied by eighteen coal-fired, cylindrical fire-tube boilers. The boilers were vented through three funnels, two placed side by side just aft of the conning tower and the third much further aft. Her engines produced a top speed of 20.1 knots (37.2 km/h; 23.1 mph) at 19,131 indicated horsepower (14,266 kW). Specific figures for her cruising radius have not survived, but the ships of her class could steam for 4,000 to 6,000 nautical miles (7,400 to 11,100 km; 4,600 to 6,900 mi) at a speed of 10 knots (19 km/h; 12 mph).

Sicilia was armed with a main battery of four 343 mm (13.5 in) 30-caliber guns, mounted in two twin-gun turrets, one on either end of the ship. She carried a secondary battery of eight 152 mm (6 in) 40-cal. guns placed singly in shielded mounts atop the upper deck, with four on each broadside. Close-range defense against torpedo boats was provided by a battery of sixteen 120 mm (4.7 in) guns in casemates in the upper deck, eight on each broadside. These were supported by twenty 57 mm (2.24 in) 43-cal. guns and ten 37 mm (1.5 in) guns. As was customary for capital ships of the period, she carried five 450 mm (17.7 in) torpedo tubes in above-water launchers.

The ship was lightly armored for her size. She was protected by belt armor that was 102 mm (4 in) thick; the belt was fairly narrow and only covered the central portion of the hull, from the forward to the aft main battery gun. She had an armored deck that was 76 mm (3 in) thick, and her conning tower was armored with 300 mm (11.8 in) of steel plate. The turrets had 102 mm thick faces and the supporting barbettes had 349 mm (13.75 in) thick steel.

== Service history ==
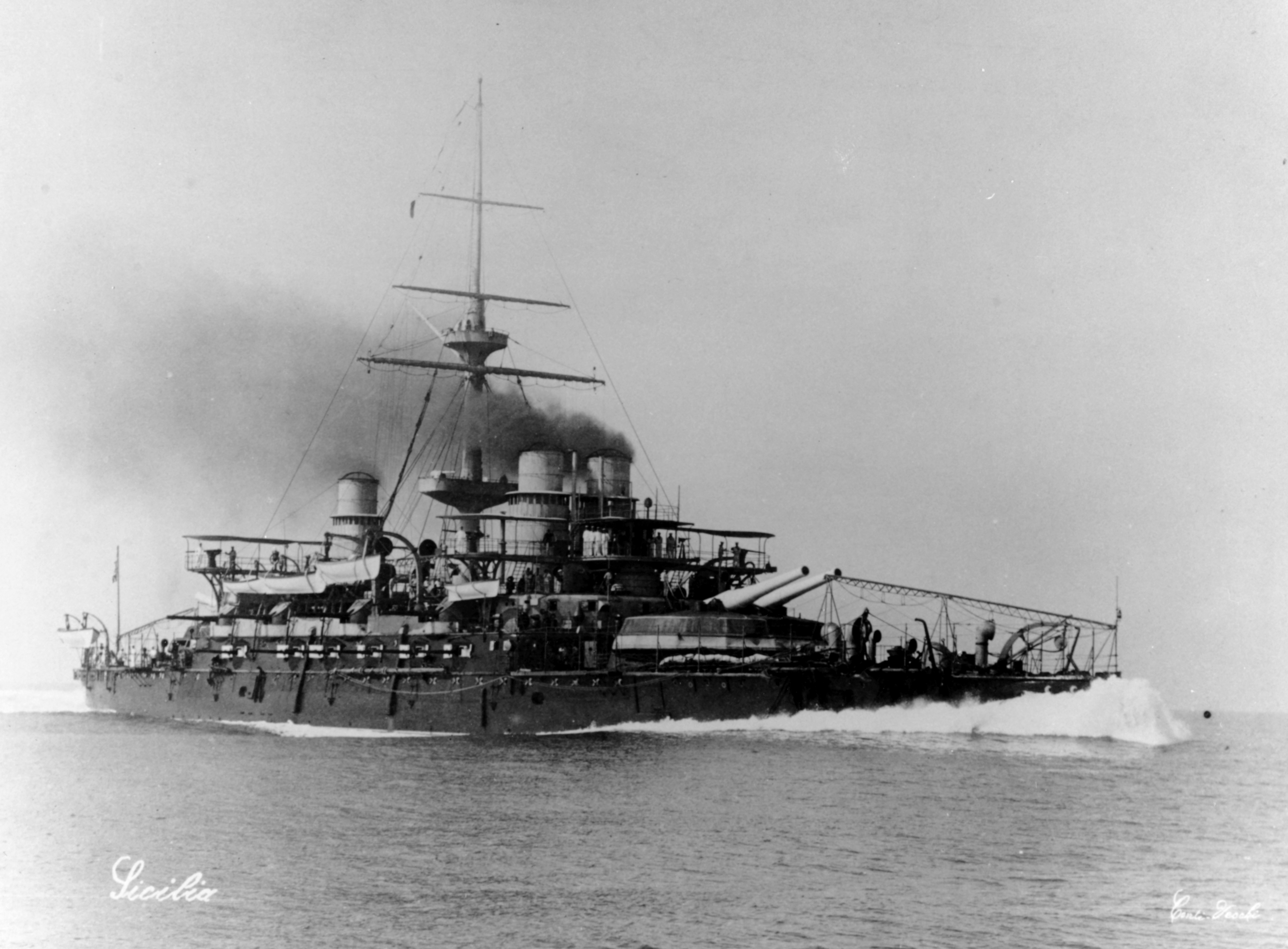
Sicilia steaming at full speed in her original configuration

Sicilia was named after the island of Sicily. She was built by the Venetian Arsenal in Venice. Her keel was laid down on 3 November 1884, and her completed hull was launched on 6 July 1891. At her launching ceremony, the new ship was christened by Queen Margherita. Fitting-out work was completed on 4 May 1895, after which the ship entered service with the Italian fleet. Sicilia took part in the annual fleet maneuvers held in August and September of 1896, which saw the ship assigned to the squadron tasked with defending against a simulated French attack on the Italian coast.

In February 1897, Sicilia arrived off Crete to serve in the International Squadron, a multinational force made up of ships of the Austro-Hungarian Navy, French Navy, Imperial German Navy, Regia Marina, Imperial Russian Navy, and British Royal Navy that intervened in the 1897–1898 Greek uprising on Crete against rule by the Ottoman Empire. At the time, Sicilia was the flagship of the 1st Division under Vice Admiral Felice Napoleone Canevaro, which also included her two sister ships, the protected cruisers Giovanni Bausan and Vesuvio, and the torpedo cruiser Euridice.

By 1899, Sicilia had been assigned to the 2nd Division. It also included the ironclads Affondatore and Castelfidardo, and the torpedo cruisers Partenope and Urania. For 1903, the Active Squadron was on active service for seven months, with the rest of the year spent with reduced crews. In 1904–1905, Sicilia and her sisters were still in service with the Active Squadron, which was kept in service for nine months of the year, with three months in reduced commission. The following year, the ships were transferred to the Reserve Squadron, along with the three Ruggiero di Lauria-class ironclads and the ironclad Enrico Dandolo, three cruisers, and sixteen torpedo boats. This squadron only entered active service for two months of the year for training maneuvers, and the rest of the year was spent with reduced crews. Sicilia was still in the Reserve Squadron in 1908, along with her two sisters and the two Ammiraglio di Saint Bon-class battleships. By this time, the Reserve Squadron was kept in service for seven months of the year.

=== Italo-Turkish War ===
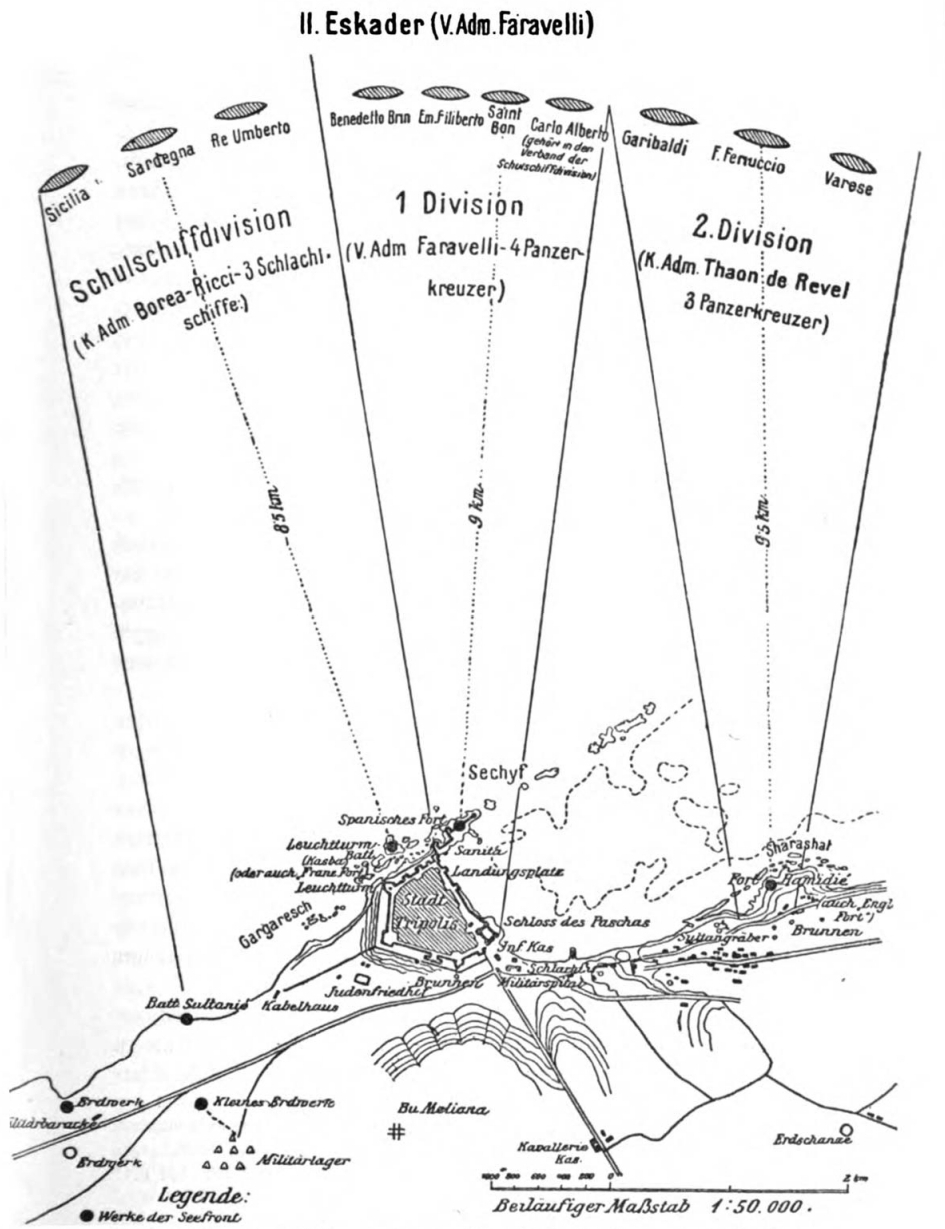
Map showing the bombardment of Tripoli

On 29 September 1911, Italy declared war on the Ottoman Empire in order to seize Libya. At the time, Sicilia and her two sisters were assigned to the Training Division, along with the old armored cruiser Carlo Alberto, with Sicilia serving as the flagship of Rear Admiral Raffaele Borea Ricci D'Olmo. On 3–4 October, Sicilia and her sisters were tasked with bombarding Fort Sultanje, which was protecting the western approach to Tripoli. The ships used their 6-inch guns to attack the fort to preserve their stock of 13.5-inch shells. By the morning of the 4th, the ships' gunfire had silenced the guns in the fort, allowing landing forces to go ashore and capture the city. These included a contingent led by Sicilia's captain. The ships of the Training Division thereafter alternated between Tripoli and Khoms to support the Italian garrisons in the two cities; this included repulsing a major Ottoman attack on Tripoli over 23–26 October, where Sicilia and Sardegna supported the Italian left flank against concerted Ottoman assaults. In November, Sicilia, Re Umberto, the torpedo cruiser Partenope, the destroyer Fulmine, and the torpedo boat Cassiopea bombarded the oasis at Taguira, though no Turkish forces were present. The Italians then sent a garrison to protect the oasis.

By December, the three ships were stationed in Tripoli, where they were replaced by the old ironclads Italia and Lepanto. Sicilia and her sisters arrived back in La Spezia, where they had their ammunition and supplies replenished. In May 1912, the Training Division patrolled the coast, but saw no action. The following month, Sicilia and her sisters, along with six torpedo boats, escorted a convoy carrying an infantry brigade to Buscheifa, one of the last ports in Libya still under Ottoman control. The Italian force arrived off the town on 14 June and made a landing; after taking the city, the Italian forces then moved on to Misrata. Sicilia and the rest of the ships continued supporting the advance until the Italians had secured the city on 20 July. The Training Division then returned to Italy, where they joined the escort for another convoy on 3 August, this time to Zuara, the last port in Ottoman hands. The ships covered the landing two miles east of Zuara two days later, which was joined by supporting attacks from the west and south. With the capture of the city, Italy now controlled the entire Libyan coast. On 14 October the Ottomans agreed to sign a peace treaty to end the war.

=== Later career ===
Sicilia became a depot ship for the new dreadnought battleship Giulio Cesare, which was then nearing completion at Taranto. Sicilia was stricken on 9 July 1914 and slated to be scrapped, but the Regia Marina decided to retain the ship after World War I broke out at the end of the month. On 16 August 1914, the ship was disarmed and returned to service as a depot ship in Taranto for ammunition and sailors. Italy had declared neutrality at the start of World War I, but by May 1915, the Triple Entente had convinced the Italians to enter the war against the Central Powers. Later in the war, Sicilia was converted into a repair ship. The ship was stricken again in 1923 and thereafter broken up for scrap.
