= Italian ironclad Re Umberto =

Ironclad warship of the Italian Royal Navy

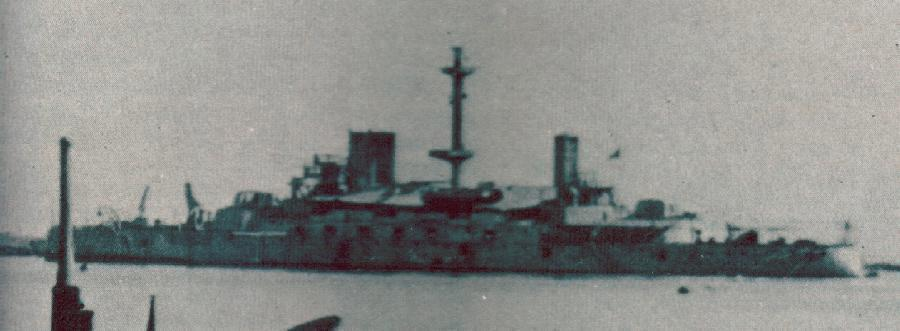
- Re Umberto at Brindisi in 1917

History

Italy
- Name: Re Umberto
- Namesake: Umberto I of Italy
- Builder: Regio Cantiere di Castellammare di Stabia
- Laid down: 10 July 1884
- Launched: 17 October 1888
- Completed: 16 February 1893
- Stricken: 10 May 1914
- Reinstated: 9 December 1915
- Fate: Stricken 1920

General characteristics
- Class & type: Re Umberto-class ironclad
- Displacement: Normal: 13,673 long tons (13,892 t); Full load: 15,454 long tons (15,702 t)
- Length: 418 ft 7.5 in (127.6 m)
- Beam: 76 ft 10.5 in (23.4 m)
- Draft: 30 ft 6 in (9.3 m)
- Installed power: 19,500 ihp (14,541 kW); 18 × fire-tube boilers
- Propulsion: 2 × compound steam engines; 2 × screw propellers
- Speed: 18.5 knots (34.3 km/h; 21.3 mph)
- Range: 4,000–6,000 nmi (7,400–11,100 km; 4,600–6,900 mi) at 10 knots (19 km/h; 12 mph)
- Complement: 733
- Armament: 4 × 343 mm (13.5 in) guns; 8 × 152 mm (6 in) guns; 16 × 120 mm (4.7 in) guns; 16 × 57 mm (2.24 in) six-pounder guns; 10 × 37 mm (1.5 in) guns; 5 × 450 mm (17.7 in) torpedo tubes
- Armor: Belt and side: 102 mm (4 in); Deck: 76.2 mm (3 in); Barbettes: 349 mm (13.75 in); Conning tower: 302 mm (11.88 in)

Re Umberto ("King Humbert") was a Re Umberto-class ironclad battleship built for the Italian Regia Marina (Royal Navy) in the 1880s, the lead ship of her class. She was laid down in July 1884 and launched in October 1888; work proceeded so slowly that she was not finished until February 1893. She was armed with a main battery of four 343 mm (13.5 in) guns and had a top speed of 20.3 knots (37.6 km/h; 23.4 mph), though this high speed came at the cost of armor protection.

Re Umberto carried out various duties during her service career, including large-scale fleet maneuvers and diplomatic missions in Europe. She saw limited action during the Italo-Turkish War in 1911–1912, escorting convoys and bombarding Ottoman troops in North Africa. By the end of the year she was withdrawn from front-line service. Decommissioned before World War I, she was used during the war as a depot ship and then as a floating battery. In 1918 her armament was exchanged for a number of 3-inch (76 mm) guns and trench mortars as part of her role as the lead ship in the planned Italian assault on the main Austro-Hungarian naval base at Pola. The war ended before the Italians could carry out the attack and she was stricken again in 1920.

== Design ==
The Italian Regia Marina embarked on a major construction program in the mid-1870s that included ten modern ironclad battleships, which gave Italy the third largest battle fleet in the world, behind only Great Britain and France. The previous designs—the Duilio, Italia, and Ruggiero di Lauriaes—carried their main battery in an en echelon arrangement, while the new Re Umberto class adopted a fore-and-aft arrangement that maximized firing arcs.

=== Characteristics ===
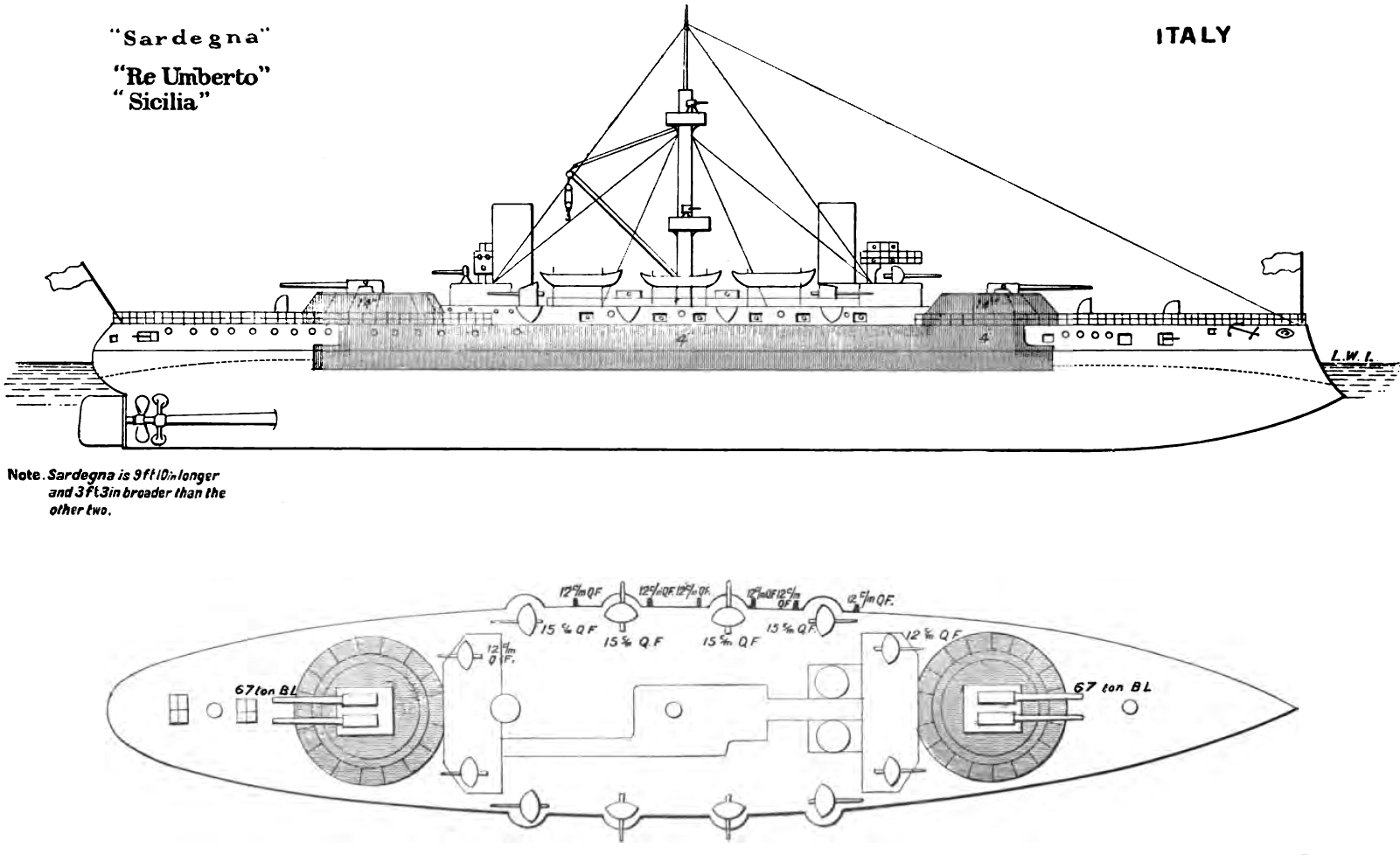
Line-drawing of the Re Umberto class

Re Umberto was 127.6 meters (419 ft) long overall; she had a beam of 23.44 m (76.9 ft) and an average draft of 9.29 m (30.5 ft). She displaced 13,673 long tons (13,892 t) normally and up to 15,454 long tons (15,702 t) at full load. The ship had an inverted bow with a ram below the waterline. She was fitted with a single military mast located amidships, which had fighting tops for some of the light guns. The ship's superstructure included a conning tower forward and a secondary conning tower further aft. She had a crew of 733 officers and men.

Her propulsion system consisted of a pair of vertical compound steam engines, each driving a single screw propeller, with steam supplied by eighteen coal-fired, cylindrical fire-tube boilers. The boilers were vented through three funnels, two placed side by side just aft of the conning tower and the third much further aft. Her engines produced a top speed of 18.5 knots (34.3 km/h; 21.3 mph) at 19,500 indicated horsepower (14,500 kW). Specific figures for her cruising radius have not survived, but the ships of her class could steam for 4,000 to 6,000 nautical miles (7,400 to 11,100 km; 4,600 to 6,900 mi) at a speed of 10 knots (19 km/h; 12 mph).

Re Umberto was armed with a main battery of four 343 mm (13.5 in) 30-caliber guns, mounted in two twin-gun turrets, one on either end of the ship. She carried a secondary battery of eight 152 mm (6 in) 40-cal. guns placed singly in shielded mounts atop the upper deck, with four on each broadside. Close-range defense against torpedo boats was provided by a battery of sixteen 120 mm (4.7 in) guns in casemates in the upper deck, eight on each broadside. These were supported by sixteen 57 mm (2.24 in) 43-cal. guns and ten 37 mm (1.5 in) guns. As was customary for capital ships of the period, she carried five 450 mm (17.7 in) torpedo tubes in above-water launchers.

The ship was lightly armored for her size. She was protected by belt armor that was 102 mm (4 in) thick; the belt was fairly narrow and only covered the central portion of the hull, from the forward to the aft main battery gun. She had an armored deck that was 76 mm (3 in) thick, and her conning tower was armored with 300 mm (11.8 in) of steel plate. The turrets had 102 mm thick faces and the supporting barbettes had 349 mm (13.75 in) thick steel.

== Service history ==
Re Umberto in dry dock c. 1897

Re Umberto was named after the Italian King Umberto I of Italy. Re Umberto was built by the Castellammare Naval Shipyard in Castellammare di Stabia, Naples. Her keel was laid down on 10 July 1884. After over four years of construction, she was launched on 17 October 1888. Following sea trials, the battleship was formally commissioned into the Regia Marina on 16 February 1893.

At the time Re Umberto was commissioned into the Regia Marina, the navy maintained two battleship squadrons; the Active Squadron and the Reserve Squadron. The ships alternated between the two in February of each year; in 1895, Re Umberto was assigned to the Reserve Squadron, along with the older battleships Ruggiero di Lauria, Italia, and Lepanto. In June 1895, the Kaiser Wilhelm Canal in Germany was completed; to celebrate, dozens of warships from fourteen different countries gathered in Kiel for a celebration hosted by Kaiser Wilhelm II. Re Umberto was one of four battleships in the flotilla that represented Italy. In July 1895 the battleship visited Portsmouth, England, anchoring at Spithead, with the English admiralty on Wednesday, July 10, sailing out on the steam-yacht Enchantress to meet the Italian squadron. The Italian naval officers were later treated to a garden party and in the evening a banquet followed by a grand ball. On July 20 a hundred Italian officers with the Duke of Genoa and Admirals Accini and Grandville inspected the dockyard. On July 22 a naval review took place with a display of torpedo boats and torpedo boat destroyers witnessed by amongst others 150 members of both Westminster houses as well as the sailing public. The British Prince of Wales visited Re Umberto and lunched with the Duke of Genoa on board the Duke's yacht Savoia followed by a banquet at the Portsmouth town hall. On the 23rd the English prince held a banquet on Savoia and Re Umberto staged a ball on board the next evening.

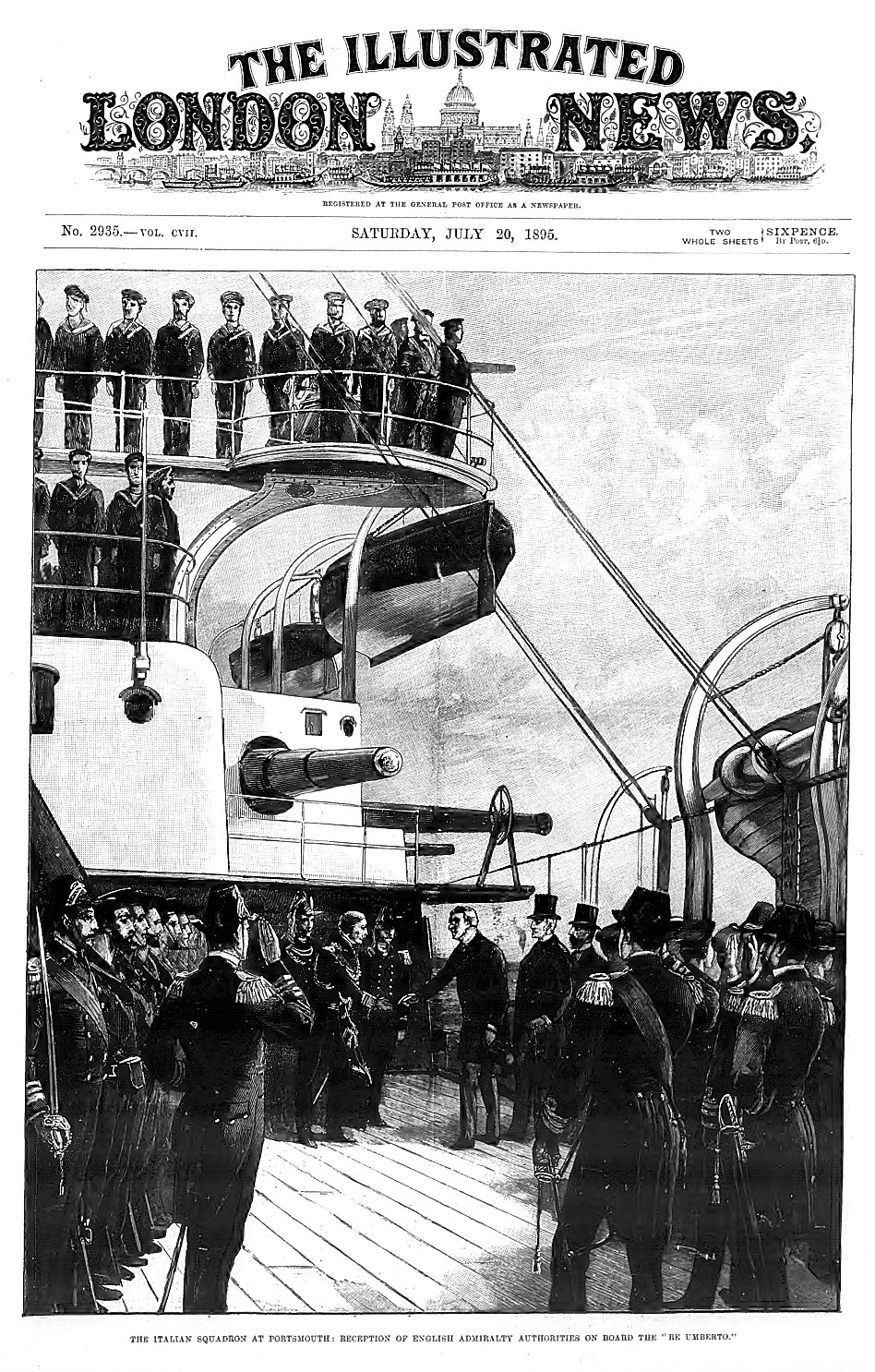
Re Umberto visits Portsmouth July 1895

All three ships of the class participated in the 1896 naval maneuvers in the Tyrrhenian Sea, held in August and September. Re Umberto was assigned to the squadron tasked with defending against a simulated French attack on the Italian coast. In February 1897, Re Umberto deployed to Crete to serve in the International Squadron, a multinational force made up of ships of the Austro-Hungarian Navy, French Navy, Imperial German Navy, Regia Marina, Imperial Russian Navy, and British Royal Navy that intervened in the 1897–1898 Greek uprising on Crete against rule by the Ottoman Empire. She arrived as part of an Italian division that also included her sister ship Sicilia (flagship of the division's commander, Vice Admiral Felice Napoleone Canevaro), the protected cruiser Vesuvio, and the torpedo cruiser Euridice. By 1899, Re Umberto had been assigned to the Active Squadron, which at that time was kept in active service for eight months of the year. It included five other battleships and several cruisers.

For 1903, the Active Squadron was on active service for seven months, with the rest of the year spent with reduced crews. In 1904–1905, Re Umberto and her sisters were in service with the Active Squadron, which was kept in service for nine months of the year, with three months in reduced commission. The following year, the ships were transferred to the Reserve Squadron, along with the three Ruggiero di Lauria-class ships and the ironclad Enrico Dandolo, three cruisers, and sixteen torpedo boats. This squadron only entered active service for two months of the year for training maneuvers, and the rest of the year was spent with reduced crews. Re Umberto was still in the Reserve Squadron in 1908, along with her two sisters and the two Ammiraglio di Saint Bon-class battleships. By this time, the Reserve Squadron was kept in service for seven months of the year.

=== Italo-Turkish War ===
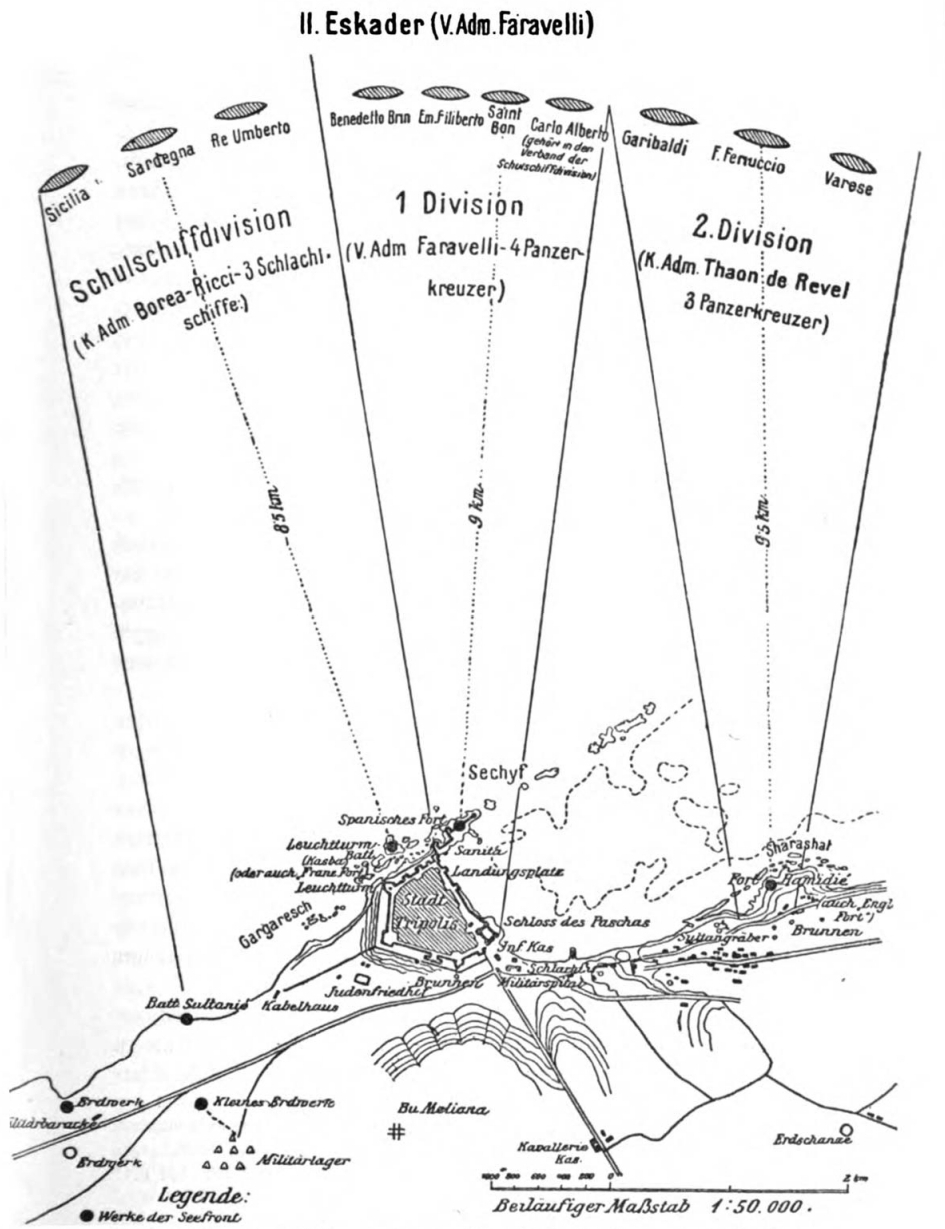
Map showing the bombardment of Tripoli

On 29 September 1911, Italy declared war on the Ottoman Empire in order to seize Libya. At the time, Re Umberto and her two sisters were assigned to the Training Division, along with the old armored cruiser Carlo Alberto, under the command of Rear Admiral Raffaele Borea Ricci D'Olmo. On 3–4 October, Re Umberto and her sisters were tasked with bombarding Fort Sultanje, which was protecting the western approach to Tripoli. The ships used their 6-inch guns to attack the fort to preserve their stock of 13.5-inch shells. By the morning of the 4th, the ships' gunfire had silenced the guns in the fort, allowing landing forces to go ashore and capture the city. The ships of the Training Division thereafter alternated between Tripoli and Khoms to support the Italian garrisons in the two cities. In November, Re Umberto, Sicilia, the torpedo cruiser Partenope, the destroyer Fulmine, and the torpedo boat Cassiopea bombarded the oasis at Taguira, though no Turkish forces were present. The Italians then sent a garrison to protect the oasis.

By December, the three ships were stationed in Tripoli, where they were replaced by the old ironclads Italia and Lepanto. Re Umberto and her sisters arrived back in La Spezia, where they had their ammunition and supplies replenished. In May 1912, the Training Division patrolled the coast, but saw no action. The following month, Re Umberto and her sisters, along with six torpedo boats, escorted a convoy carrying an infantry brigade to Buscheifa, one of the last ports in Libya still under Ottoman control. The Italian force arrived off the town on 14 June and made a landing; after taking the city, the Italian forces then moved on to Misrata. Re Umberto and the rest of the ships continued supporting the advance until the Italians had secured the city on 20 July. The Training Division then returned to Italy, where they joined the escort for another convoy on 3 August, this time to Zuara, the last port in Ottoman hands. The ships covered the landing two miles east of Zuara two days later, which was joined by supporting attacks from the west and south. With the capture of the city, Italy now controlled the entire Libyan coast. On 14 October the Ottomans agreed to sign a peace treaty to end the war.

=== Later career ===
Re Umberto was laid up in Genoa in 1912 and became a depot ship. Towed to La Spezia in June 1915, after having been stricken from the Navy List on 10 May 1914, she became a depot ship for the dreadnought Andrea Doria. She was reinstated on 9 December 1915 and became a floating battery at Brindisi and, later, Valona, Albania. In 1918, Re Umberto was tasked to lead the planned assault on the primary Austro-Hungarian naval base at Pola and modified for the role by the removal of her armament and the addition of eight 3-inch guns with gun shields as well as a number of trench mortars. A special saw and cutters were also installed to deal with the harbor boom and net defenses. The war ended before the Italians could carry out the attack and she was again stricken on 4 July 1920.
