= Italian cruiser Tripoli =

Torpedo cruiser of the Italian Royal Navy

- Tripoli sometime before 1897

Class overview
- Preceded by: Pietro Micca
- Succeeded by: Goito class

History

Kingdom of Italy
- Name: Tripoli
- Namesake: Tripoli
- Builder: Regio Cantiere di Castellammare di Stabia
- Laid down: 10 June 1885
- Launched: 25 August 1886
- Completed: 1 December 1886
- Stricken: 4 March 1923

General characteristics
- Type: Torpedo cruiser
- Displacement: Normal: 835 long tons (848 t); Full load: 952 long tons (967 t)
- Length: 73.4 m (240 ft 10 in)
- Beam: 7.88 m (25 ft 10 in)
- Draft: 3.65 m (12 ft)
- Installed power: 6 × locomotive boilers; 2,543 ihp (1,896 kW)
- Propulsion: 3 × double-expansion steam engines; 3 × screw propellers
- Speed: 17.5 kn (32.4 km/h; 20.1 mph)
- Range: 1,000 nmi (1,900 km; 1,200 mi) at 10 kn (19 km/h; 12 mph)
- Complement: 105–111
- Armament: 1 × 4.7 in (120 mm) gun; 6 × 57 mm (2.24 in) guns; 2 × 37 mm (1.5 in) guns; 3 × 37 mm Hotchkiss guns; 5 × 14 in (356 mm) torpedo tubes
- Armor: Deck: 1.5 in (38 mm)

Tripoli was the first modern torpedo cruiser built for the Italian Regia Marina (Royal Navy). She was built by the Regio Cantiere di Castellammare di Stabia shipyard in 1885–86. The only vessel of her class, she provided the basis for the Goito and Partenope classes that followed. She was armed with five 14-inch (356 mm) torpedo tubes and a battery of light guns, and was capable of a top speed of 17.5 knots (32.4 km/h; 20.1 mph). Tripoli spent her career in the main Italian fleet, where she was occupied primarily with peacetime training exercises. She was modernized several times throughout her career, and in 1910, was converted into a minelayer, a role she served in for another thirteen years, including during World War I. She was the longest serving torpedo cruiser in the Italian fleet, with over 36 years in service by the time she was discarded in March 1923.

== Design ==
Tripoli was the first modern torpedo cruiser built by the Regia Marina; she followed the earlier cruiser Pietro Micca, which had been a failed design that did not see much use. The design for Tripoli was prepared by Engineering Inspector Benedetto Brin. Brin had previously designed several classes of very large ironclad battleships, including the Duilio and Italia classes, but by the 1880s, he had begun to embrace the ideas of the Jeune École, which emphasized small, fast, torpedo-armed vessels that could damage or destroy the much larger battleships at a fraction of the cost. Though an experimental design, Tripoli proved to be much more successful in service than Pietro Micca, and she served as the basis for twelve further cruisers of the Goito and Partenope classes.

=== Characteristics ===
Tripoli early in her career; note the light sailing rig

Tripoli was 70 meters (229 ft 8 in) long between perpendiculars and 73.4 m (240 ft 10 in) long overall. She had a beam of 7.88 m (25 ft 10 in) and an average draft of 3.65 m (12 ft). She displaced 835 long tons (848 t) normally and 952 long tons (967 t) at full load. The ship was originally fitted with two pole masts with a light rigging, though the masts were later cut down. She had a crew of between 105 and 111.

Her propulsion system consisted of three double-expansion steam engines, each driving a single screw propeller; she was the first Italian warship to be fitted with a triple-shaft propulsion system. Steam was supplied by six coal-fired locomotive boilers that were trunked into two funnels. Tripoli could steam at a top speed of 17.5 knots (32.4 km/h; 20.1 mph) from 2,543 indicated horsepower (1,896 kW). Tripoli had a cruising radius of 1,000 nautical miles (1,900 km; 1,200 mi) at a speed of 10 knots (19 km/h; 12 mph).

The primary armament for Tripoli was five 14 in (356 mm) torpedo tubes. Two tubes were mounted in the bow and the other three were mounted in trainable deck launchers, one at the stern and two amidships. She was also equipped with one 4.7-inch (120 mm) 32-caliber (cal.) gun for use against enemy counterparts. Defense against torpedo boats was provided by a secondary battery of six 57 mm (2.24 in) 43-cal. guns, two 37 mm (1.5 in) 20-cal. guns, and three 37 mm revolving Hotchkiss guns, all mounted singly. In 1904, the ship was rearmed with a single 3 in (76 mm) 40-cal. gun, six 57 mm 40-cal. guns, one 47 mm (1.9 in) 40-cal. gun; two of the torpedo tubes were removed. In 1910, Tripoli was converted into a minelayer; the remaining torpedo tubes were removed and equipment to handle 64 mines was installed. A second 3 in gun was added and all of the light guns were removed with the exception of four of the 57 mm guns. The ship was protected with an armored deck that was 1.5 in (38 mm) thick.

== Service history ==
The keel for Tripoli was laid down at the Regio Cantiere di Castellammare di Stabia shipyard on 10 June 1885. Work proceeded quickly, and she was launched on 25 August 1886, and fitting out was completed by 1 December that year. The ship took part in the annual fleet maneuvers of 1887, which began on 10 June 1887. Tripoli was assigned to the "attacking squadron", along with the ironclads San Martino, Duilio, and Ancona, the protected cruiser Giovanni Bausan, and several other vessels. The first half of the maneuvers tested the ability to attack and defend the Strait of Messina, and concluded in time for a fleet review by King Umberto I on the 21st. The second phase consisted of joint maneuvers with the Italian Army; Tripoli and the torpedo cruiser Folgore were tasked with blockading Livorno. The exercises lasted until 30 July. In 1888, she took part in the annual fleet maneuvers, along with five ironclads, a protected cruiser, the torpedo cruisers Goito, Saetta, and Folgore, and numerous smaller vessels. The maneuvers consisted of close-order drills and a simulated attack on and defense of La Spezia. Later that year, the ship was present during a naval review held for the German Kaiser Wilhelm II during a visit to Italy.

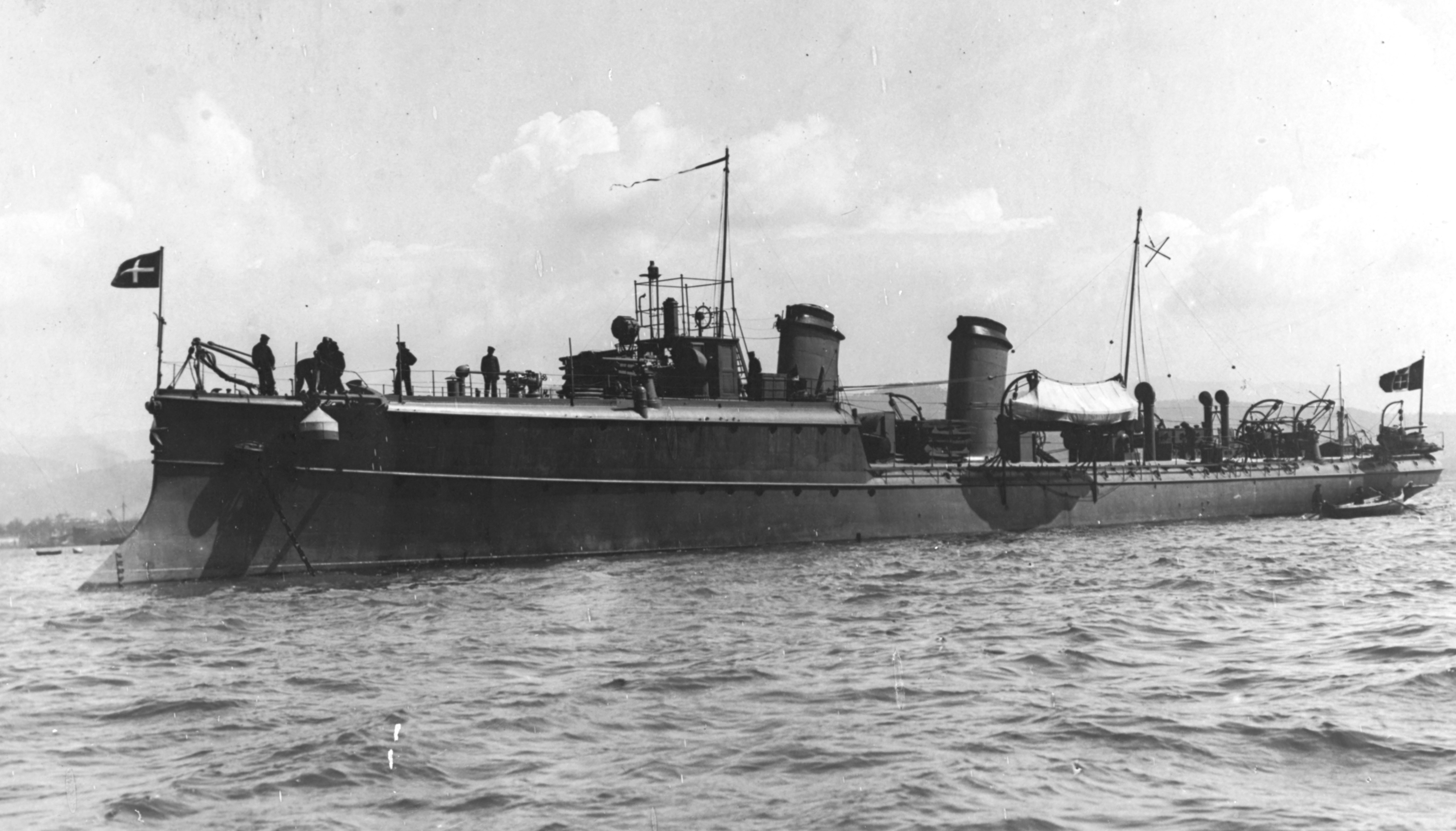
Tripoli after her modernization

Tripoli was assigned to the 2nd Division of the Active Squadron, along with the ironclad Francesco Morosini, the protected cruiser Ettore Fieramosca, and four torpedo boats. In 1895, Tripoli was stationed in the 2nd Maritime Department, split between Taranto and Naples, along with most of the torpedo cruisers in the Italian fleet. These included the four Goito and the eight Partenope-class cruisers. In 1896, she took part in the annual summer maneuvers in July as part of the Second Division of the Active Squadron, which also included the ironclads Francesco Morosini and Andrea Doria and the protected cruiser Giovanni Bausan.

Tripoli was taken out of service in 1897–1898 to be modernized. She was re-boilered with new water-tube boilers manufactured by the German firm Schichau-Werke, a new bow with a higher forecastle was fitted, and her masts were cut down. The ship was stationed in Naples in 1900, along with the old ironclads Regina Maria Pia, Castelfidardo, and Affondatore, the armored cruiser Marco Polo, the four Goito-class cruisers, and the two new Agordat-class cruisers. In 1910, Tripoli was converted into a minelayer, with capacity for 64 naval mines. At the outbreak of the Italo-Turkish War in September 1911, Goito was stationed in Venice along with Tripoli and Montebello. None of the vessels saw action during the war.

Italy had declared neutrality at the start of World War I, but by July 1915, the Triple Entente had convinced the Italians to enter the war against the Central Powers. Admiral Paolo Thaon di Revel, the Italian naval chief of staff, believed that the threat from Austro-Hungarian submarines and naval mines in the narrow waters of the Adriatic was too serious for him to use the fleet in an active way. Instead, Revel decided to implement a blockade at the relatively safer southern end of the Adriatic with the main fleet, while smaller vessels, such as the MAS boats, conducted raids on Austro-Hungarian ships and installations. She continued to serve as a minelayer during the war in support of Revel's strategy. She was officially reclassified as a minelayer on 1 July 1921, though she did not remain in service for very long, being stricken from the naval register on 4 March 1923 and thereafter broken up for scrap. At the time of her disposal, Tripoli was the last torpedo cruiser still in the Italian fleet's inventory, surpassing even the Agordat class, which had been built fifteen years after Tripoli entered service.
