= Regio Cantiere di Castellammare di Stabia =

Italian shipyard

Coordinates: 40.6923°N 14.4678°E

- Castellammare di Stabia, Italy
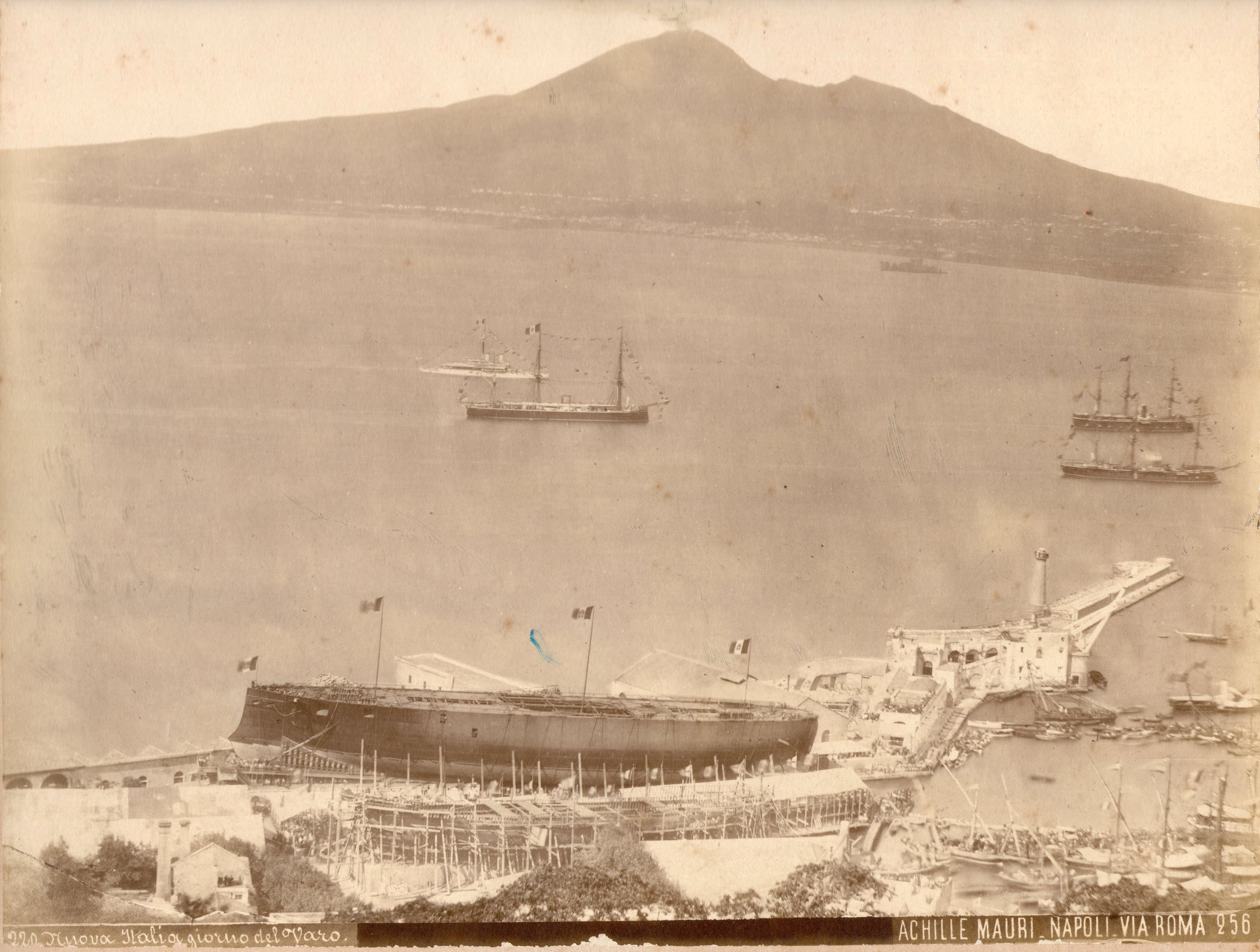
- Launching of the ironclad Italia in 1880

Site information
- Type: Shipyard
- Controlled by: Royal Italian Navy

Site history
- Built: 1783; 243 years ago
- In use: 1783–1939 (privatized)

The Regio Cantiere di Castellammare di Stabia (Royal Dockyard of Castellammare di Stabia) was founded in 1783 by Sir John Acton, Prime Minister of Ferdinand IV of the Kingdom of Naples. Its first vessel, the Neapolitan ship of the line Partenope, was completed three years later. The shipyard was initially unable to build more than one ship of the line and a frigate simultaneously until it was enlarged by order of King Joachim Murat in 1808. It built its first steam-powered ship in the early 1840s.

The shipyard was absorbed by the Naples-based holding company, Navalmeccanica, in 1939. Almost totally destroyed during World War II, the dockyard had to be rebuilt before it could resume operations. Navalmeccanica was incorporated into Italcantieri in 1966, which was in turn taken over by Fincantieri in 1984.

== Bibliography ==
- Brescia, Maurizio (2012). Mussolini's Navy: A Reference Guide to the Regina Marina 1930–45. Annapolis, Maryland: Naval Institute Press. ISBN 978-1-59114-544-8.
