= QF 6-pounder Nordenfelt =

QF 6 pounder Nordenfelt
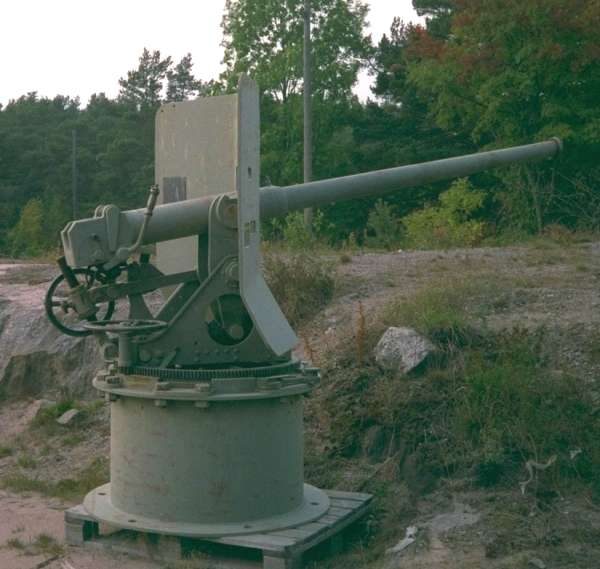
- 48-calibre version at Gyltö, western archipelago of Finland, 1999
- Type: Naval gun Coast defence gun
- Place of origin: United Kingdom

Service history
- In service: 1885 - 19??
- Used by: Many countries

Production history
- Designed: 1885
- Manufacturer: Nordenfelt Guns and Ammunition Company; Maxim-Nordenfelt

Specifications
- Mass: UK 42-cal version : 638 pounds (289 kg) barrel & breech
- Length: various, 42-50 calibres
- Shell: Fixed QF 6 lb (2.7 kg)
- Calibre: 57-millimetre (2.24 in)
- Breech: Vertical sliding-block with locking wedge
- Muzzle velocity: 1,818 ft/s (554 m/s)
- Maximum firing range: 4,500–6,000 yd (4,100–5,500 m)

The QF 6 pounder Nordenfelt was a light 57 mm naval gun and coast defence gun of the late 19th century used by many countries.

Note that this gun should not be confused with the short-barreled 57 mm Cockerill-Nordenfelt "Canon de caponnière" or fortification gun, which was used to arm the German A7V tank in World War I.

Nordenfelt guns can be visually differentiated from equivalent and similar Hotchkiss guns by having slimmer barrels than the Hotchkiss, hence the Nordenfelt was considerably lighter.

== United Kingdom ==
The UK adopted a 42-calibre version as Ordnance QF 6-pounder Nordenfelt (Note: British forces traditionally denoted smaller ordnance by the weight of its standard projectile, in this case 6 pounds (2.7 kg).) Mk I, Mk II, Mk III.

=== United Kingdom Naval service ===
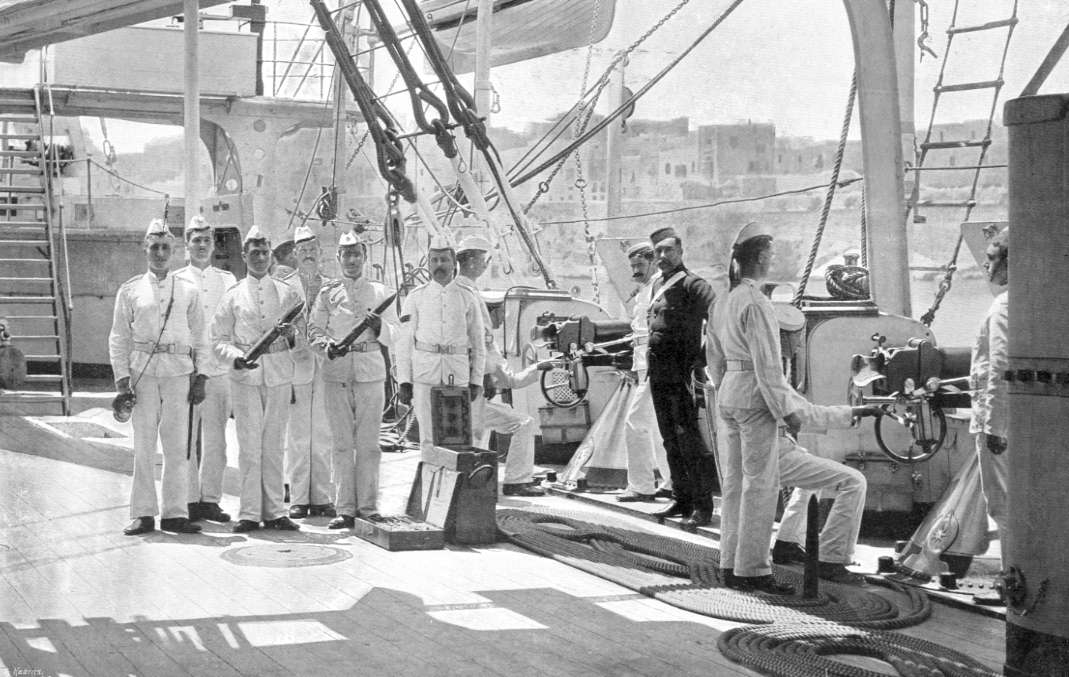
Gun drill on HMS Camperdown, circa 1896

They were originally mounted from 1885 onwards for use against the new (steam-driven) torpedo boats which started to enter service in the late 1870s. The Nordenfelt gun was adopted at the same time as the very similar QF 6 pounder Hotchkiss, but the Navy was not satisfied with the special Nordenfelt ammunition and fuzes. Following the explosion in 1900 of an ammunition ship due to defective fuses, Britain replaced Nordenfelt fuzes with the Hotchkiss design. Nordenfelt guns were phased out in favour of the Hotchkiss and were declared obsolete by 1919.

== Finland ==
When Finland gained its independence from Russia in 1917 dozens of QF 6-pounder Nordenfelt cannons were stationed in Finland. After the Finnish Civil War in 1918 around 35 - 40 Nordenfelt cannons became available to the Finnish army.

These guns were later used as a standard light coastal gun of the Finnish coastal artillery and were in service until the 1950s. During World War II some of these guns were also used as fortification artillery and bunker guns in the Mannerheim Line.

== Lithuania ==
Lithuanian coast police boat "Partizanas" with 57 mm Nordenfelt gun, 1933-1939.

One 57 mm Nordenfelt coast defence gun of unknown origin, likely inherited from Russian Empire, in 1933 was taken from Army's storage and mounted on newly built coastal police ship "Partizanas". No records about its practical use are known, despite the ship used its armaments in at least one operation against smugglers in the Baltic Sea.

No records about its performance have survived, yet the documents indicate that by September 1939 ship was rearmed with 37 mm gun.

== Ammunition ==
Diagrams showing the proprietary Nordenfelt 1-inch (top left) and 6-pounder (all others, labelled "2.2 inch") ammunition designs :

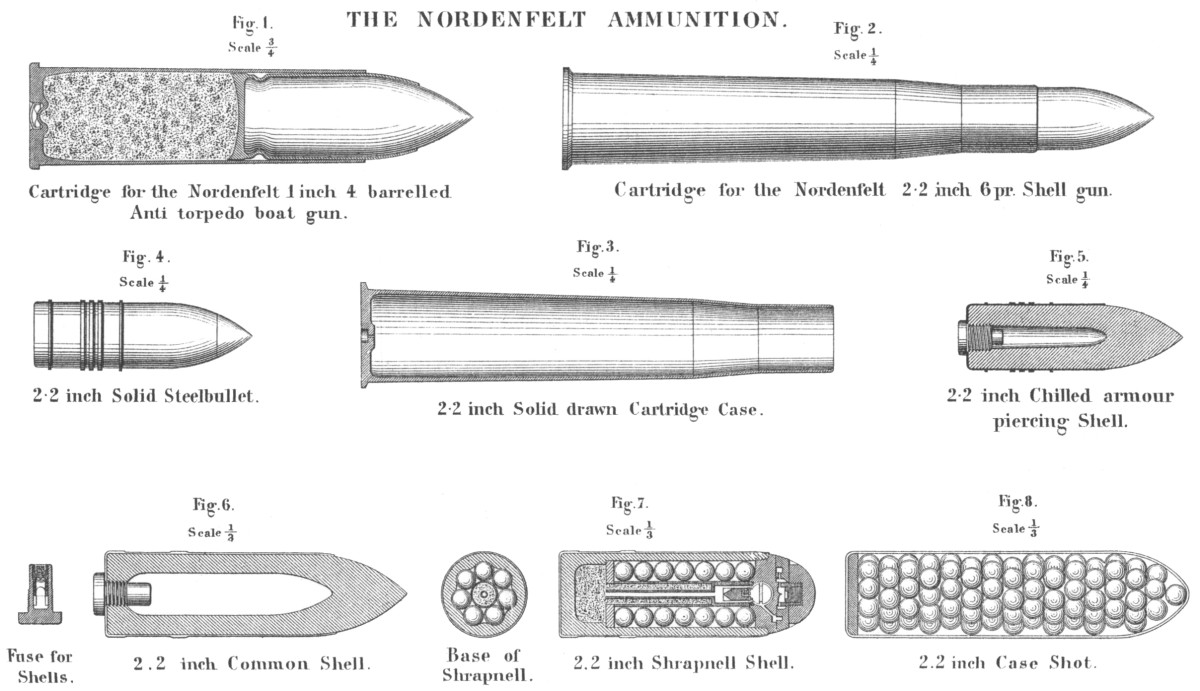

== Surviving examples ==
- A gun at Royal Queensland Yacht Squadron, Manly, Queensland, Australia
- A gun at the Manege Military Museum, Helsinki, Finland
- One used in the Battle of Manila Bay in 1898 is displayed at Denton, Maryland

== See also ==
- List of naval guns

=== Weapons of comparable role, performance and era ===
- QF 6-pounder Hotchkiss: Hotchkiss equivalent

== Bibliography ==
- Text Book of Gunnery, 1902. LONDON : PRINTED FOR HIS MAJESTY'S STATIONERY OFFICE, BY HARRISON AND SONS, ST. MARTIN'S LANE
- I.V. Hogg and L.F. Thurston, British Artillery Weapons & Ammunition 1914-1918. London: Ian Allan, 1972.
