= List of torpedo cruisers of Italy =

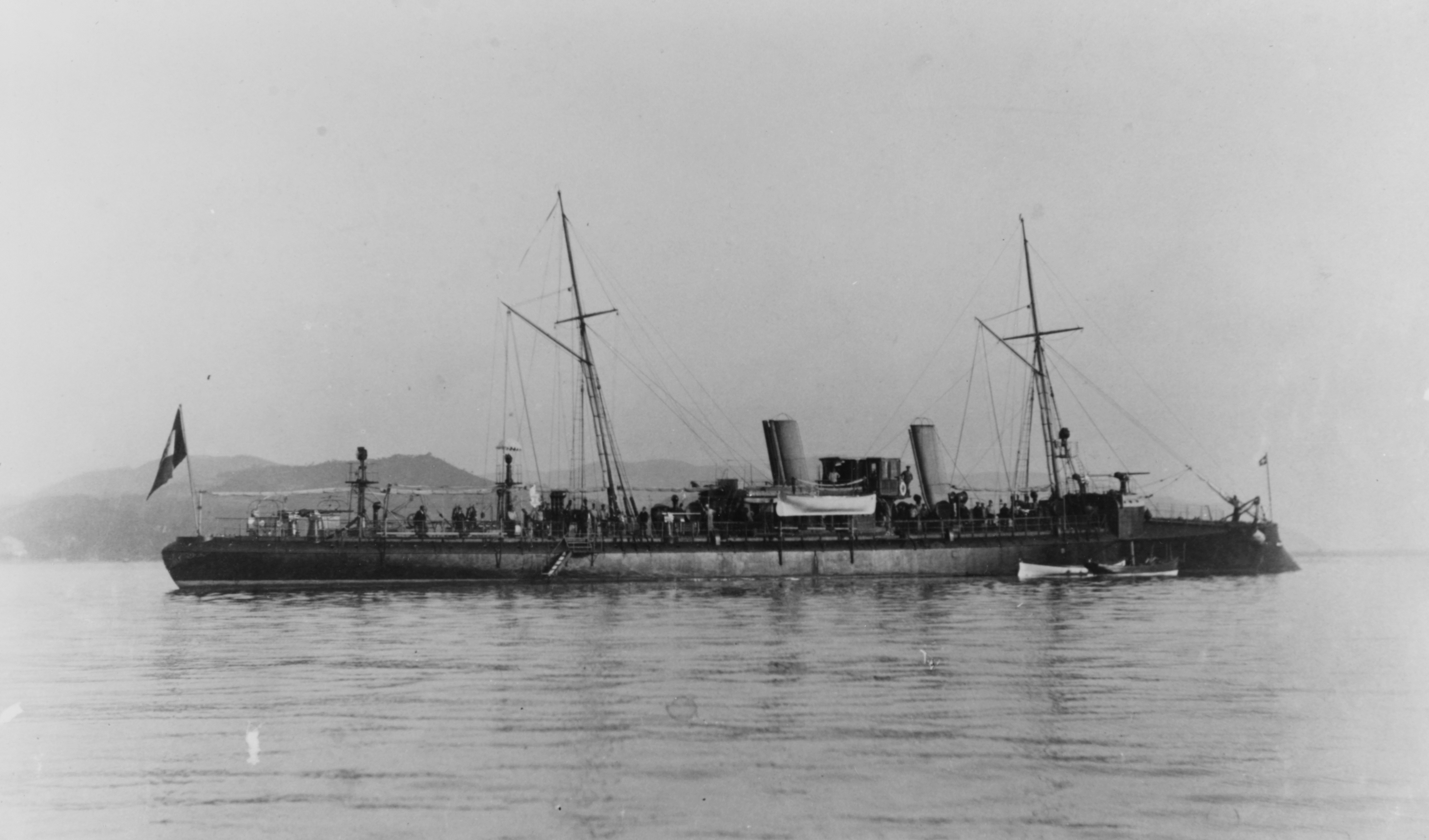
The Goito-class cruiser Monzambano shortly after entering service, c. 1889

Between the 1870s and 1890s, the Italian Regia Marina (Royal Navy) built a series of torpedo cruisers, as part of a program intended to strengthen the fleet during a period of limited naval budgets. A total of six different classes comprising eighteen vessels were constructed. The first vessel, Pietro Micca, was laid down in 1875, and was one of the first torpedo cruisers built by any navy. She proved to be a disappointment in service, being too slow to be an effective warship. Pietro Micca was followed by the more successful design, Tripoli, which provided the basis for the four Goito-class cruisers and the eight-vessel Partenope class. The four Goitos were built on an experimental basis, with Confienza being used as the basis for the Partenopes. While those vessels were being built, a pair of smaller vessels—the Folgore class—were ordered. The final class, which comprised Agordat and Coatit, was built in the late 1890s to be fleet scouts. Like Pietro Micca, the Agordat class was too slow for its intended role.

Most of the Italian torpedo cruisers served during the relatively uneventful 1880s, 1890s, and 1900s, and as a result, saw little activity outside of routine training operations. By the early 1900s, many of the cruisers had been reduced to subsidiary roles or had been discarded outright. A handful of vessels, specifically of the Partenope and Agordat classes, were still in front-line service by the time of the Italo-Turkish War in 1911–1912, and they saw action primarily as coastal bombardment vessels supporting Italian forces operating in North Africa. The surviving vessels still in service during World War I saw no offensive operations, though four—Tripoli, Goito, Partenope, and Minerva—that had been converted into minelayers, were employed to help blockade the Austro-Hungarian Navy in the Adriatic Sea. Partenope was torpedoed and sunk by a German U-boat in March 1918, the only Italian torpedo cruiser to be lost to hostile action. Long since obsolete by the early 1920s, the remaining torpedo cruisers were then sold for scrap. Their place in the fleet's reconnaissance force was taken by a group of German and Austro-Hungarian light cruisers that were acquired as war reparations.

Key
Armament	The number and type of the primary armament
Armor	The maximum thickness of the deck armor
Displacement	Ship displacement at full combat load
Propulsion	Number of shafts, type of propulsion system, and top speed generated
Service	The dates work began and finished on the ship and its ultimate fate
Laid down	The date the keel assembly commenced
Commissioned	The date the ship was commissioned

== Pietro Micca ==
In the aftermath of the Italian fleet's defeat at the Battle of Lissa in 1866, the Italian parliament drastically reduced naval budgets. By the 1870s, the small budgets precluded the acquisition of a large battle fleet centered on new ironclads like the Duilio class then under construction, and so Admiral Simone Antonio Saint-Bon, then the Italian Minister of the Navy, ordered a small, fast vessel that was armed with torpedoes. The experimental vessel was to provide the basis for further such ships, which would increase the combat power of the Regia Marina at a fraction of the cost of a new ironclad. The new vessel was one of the first torpedo cruisers to be built by any navy. Her flat-bottomed hull prevented her from reaching her intended speed, which meant that she would be unable to catch the ironclads she was intended to destroy. She spent little time in active service as a result, and the Italian navy did not build another torpedo cruiser for almost another decade. In November 1893, the navy sold the vessel and she was subsequently broken up.

Summary of the Pietro Micca class
Ship	Armament	Armor	Displacement	Propulsion	Service		
Ship	Armament	Armor	Displacement	Propulsion	Laid down	Commissioned	Fate
Pietro Micca	1 × 16 in (406 mm) torpedo tube	0.5 to 0.75 in (13 to 19 mm)	598 long tons (608 t)	1 shaft, single-expansion steam engine, 12.88 kn (23.85 km/h; 14.82 mph)	15 February 1875	3 July 1877	Broken up, 1893

== Tripoli ==
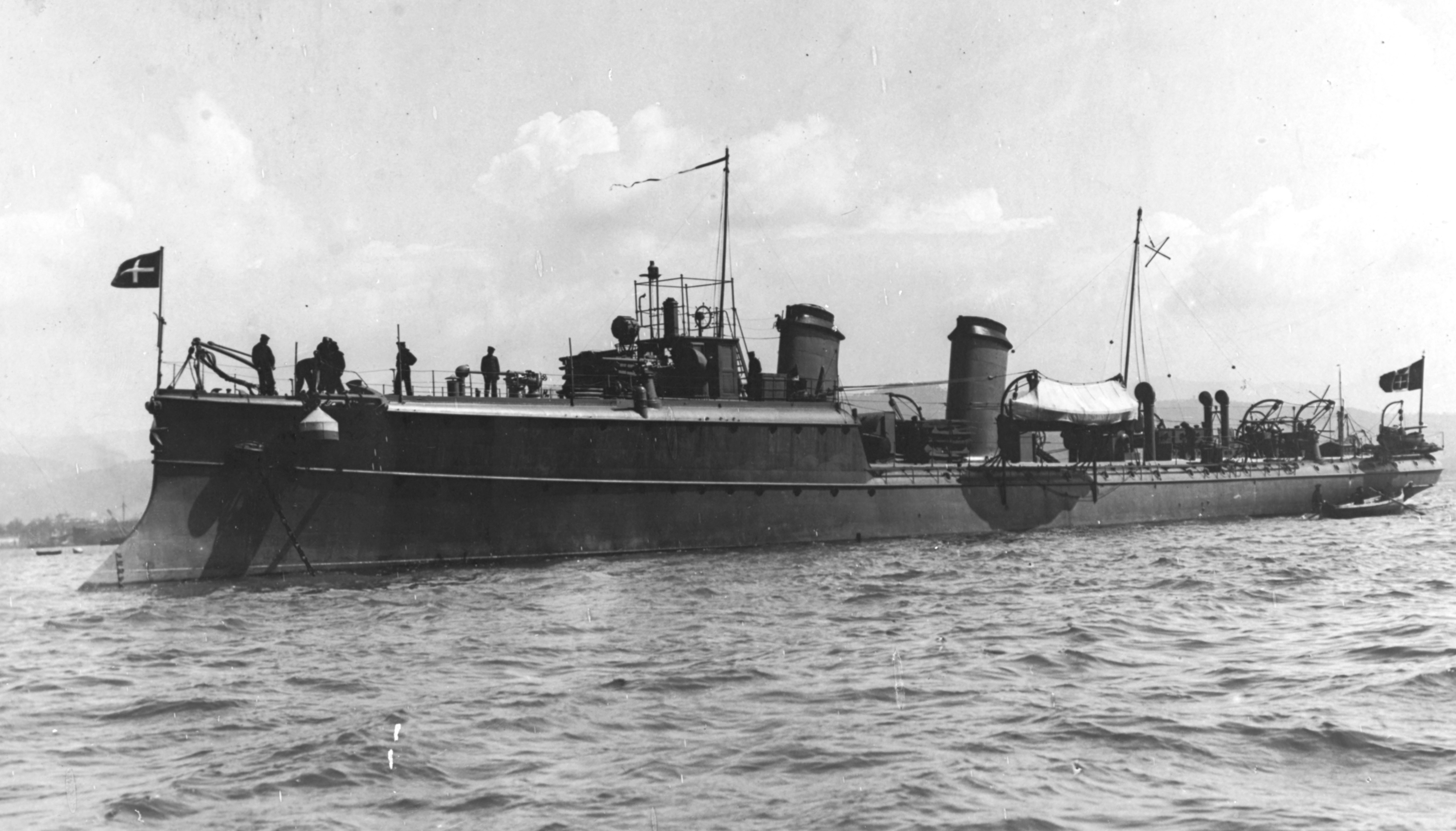
Tripoli after her modernization

By the mid-1880s, Engineering Inspector Benedetto Brin—the designer of the Duilio and Italia-class ironclads—had begun to experiment with the ideas of the Jeune École, which emphasized small, fast, torpedo-armed vessels that could damage or destroy the much larger battleships at a fraction of the cost. His first experiment was a new torpedo cruiser that was to correct the defects of Pietro Micca, most importantly her slow speed. The new vessel, Tripoli, was nearly 5 knots (9.3 km/h; 5.8 mph) faster than Pietro Micca, and she carried five torpedo tubes to Pietro Micca's single tube, significantly increasing her offensive power. She was so successful that she proved to be the basis for twelve more similar vessels of the Goito and Partenope classes built over the following decade.

Tripoli served with the Italian fleet until 1910, during which time she participated in extensive fleet training exercises that helped to develop Italian naval doctrine and tactics. She was modernized in 1897–1898, receiving new boilers and a modified bow, among other changes. In 1910, she was converted into a minelayer. She served in this capacity during the Italo-Turkish War of 1911–1912 but she saw no action during the conflict. She remained in service through World War I, during which the Italian fleet made extensive use of minefields to keep the Austro-Hungarian Navy contained in the narrow waters of the Adriatic Sea. Tripoli remained in the fleet's inventory until 1923, when she was discarded and broken up for scrap. By that time, she was the last Italian torpedo cruiser, having served for more than thirty-six years.

Summary of the Tripoli class
Ship	Armament	Armor	Displacement	Propulsion	Service		
Ship	Armament	Armor	Displacement	Propulsion	Laid down	Commissioned	Fate
Tripoli	5 × 14 in (356 mm) torpedo tubes 1 × 4.7 in (120 mm) gun	1.5 in (38 mm)	829 long tons (842 t)	3 shafts, double-expansion steam engines, 17.5 kn (32.4 km/h; 20.1 mph)	10 June 1885	1 December 1886	Broken up, 1923

== Goito class ==
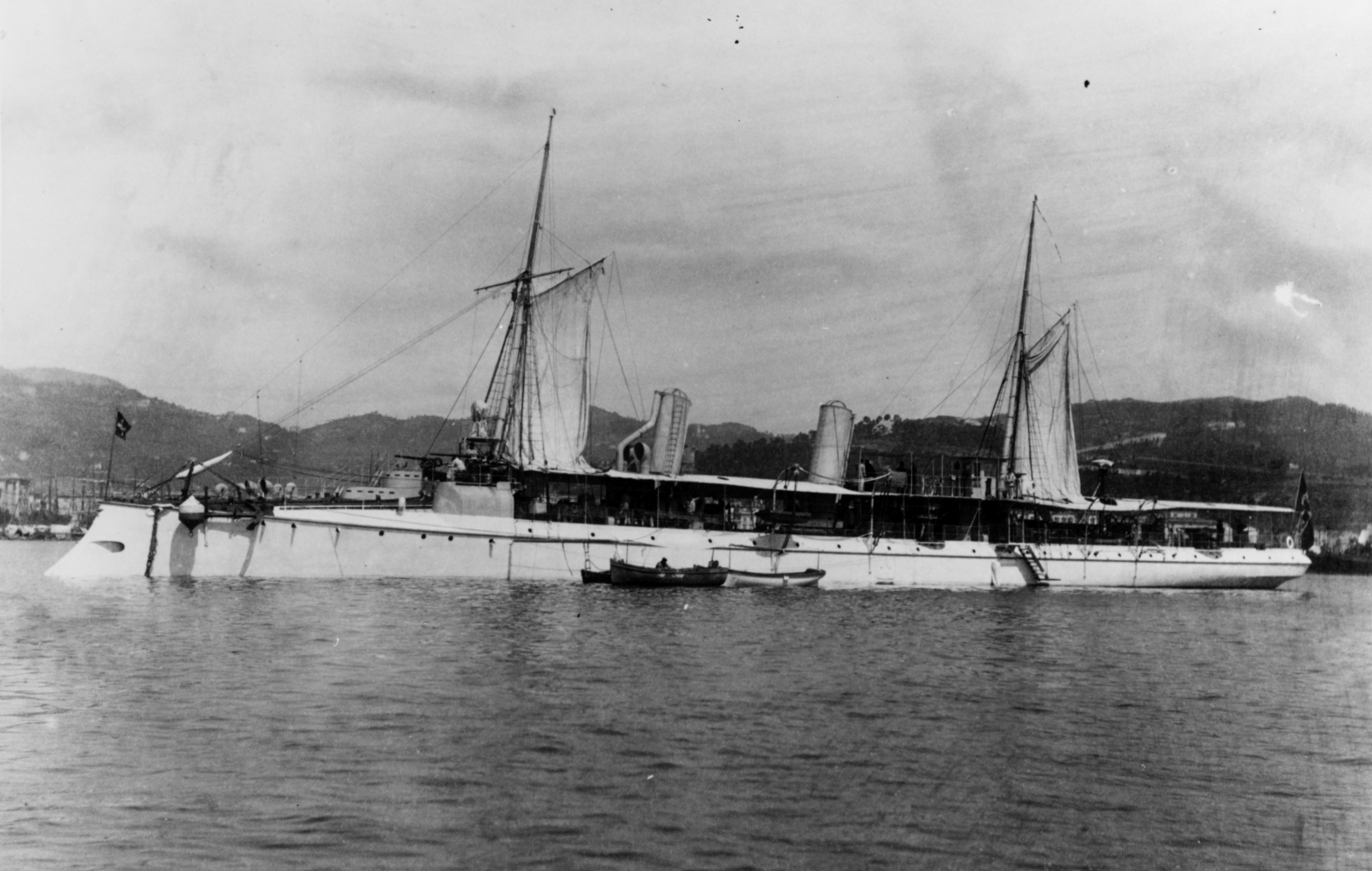
Goito early in her career with canvas awnings erected, c. early 1890s

Brin continued his experimentation with the Goito class, adopting different hull forms, propulsion systems, and light gun batteries to determine the most effective configuration for the new warship type. He was joined in this task by Engineering Director Giacinto Pullino, who prepared the design for Confienza. Despite their variations, all were broadly similar to Tripoli, upon which their designs were based. The follow-on Partenope class adopted the two-shaft engine arrangement that had been used in Confienza, along with her gun armament suite, which included a single 4.7-inch (120 mm) gun; she was the only member of the class to carry a medium-caliber gun.

Like Tripoli, the four Goitos served with the fleet and participated in training exercises. These exercises frequently gamed the problem of a French naval attack on various Italian ports, France then being Italy's most likely adversary, owing to Italy's membership in the Triple Alliance with Germany and Austria-Hungary. When not conducting maneuvers, the ships were frequently placed in reserve to reduce operational costs. By the late 1890s, the ships began to be withdrawn from frontline service, with Goito being converted into a minelayer in 1897, Montebello becoming a training ship in 1898; Monzambano and Confienza were simply stricken from the register in 1901 and sold for scrap. During World War I, Goito supported the minelaying operations against Austria-Hungary, and she and Montebello were both discarded after the war in 1920.

Summary of the Goito class
Ship	Armament	Armor	Displacement	Propulsion	Service		
Ship	Armament	Armor	Displacement	Propulsion	Laid down	Commissioned	Fate
Goito	5 × 14 in torpedo tubes	1.5 in	955 to 974 long tons (970 to 990 t)	3 shafts, double-expansion steam engines, 18 kn (33 km/h; 21 mph)	September 1885	16 February 1888	Broken up, 1920
Montebello	5 × 14 in torpedo tubes	1.5 in	955 to 974 long tons (970 to 990 t)	3 shafts, double-expansion steam engines, 18 kn (33 km/h; 21 mph)	25 September 1885	14 March 1888	Broken up, 1920
Monzambano	5 × 14 in torpedo tubes	1.5 in	955 to 974 long tons (970 to 990 t)	3 shafts, triple-expansion steam engines, 18 kn	25 August 1885	14 March 1888	Broken up, 1901
Confienza	5 × 14 in torpedo tubes 1 × 4.7 in gun	1.5 in	955 to 974 long tons (970 to 990 t)	2 shafts, double-expansion steam engines, 17 kn (31 km/h; 20 mph)	September 1887	11 April 1890	Broken up, 1901

== Folgore class ==
Saetta at anchor

The next class of torpedo cruisers built for the Italian fleet, the Folgore class, marked further experimentation on the part of Brin. These two ships were significantly smaller than the other torpedo cruisers Brin designed, though they still carried an armament of three torpedo tubes, and they were nearly as fast as the Goitos. They were not particularly successful vessels and their design was not repeated in future torpedo cruisers. The ships had uneventful careers, though this was in part due to the fact that Folgore was badly damaged in a collision with the protected cruiser Giovanni Bausan early in her career, and she could not be repaired to her original configuration. Saetta was frequently placed in reserve, and in 1897 she became a gunnery training ship. Folgore was broken up in 1900, and Saetta was dismantled in 1908.

Summary of the Folgore class
Ship	Armament	Armor	Displacement	Propulsion	Service		
Ship	Armament	Armor	Displacement	Propulsion	Laid down	Commissioned	Fate
Folgore	3 × 14 in torpedo tubes	—	364 long tons (370 t)	2 shafts, double-expansion steam engines, 17 kn	Unknown	16 February 1887	Broken up, 1900
Saetta	3 × 14 in torpedo tubes	—	394 long tons (400 t)	2 shafts, double-expansion steam engines, 17 kn	Unknown	16 February 1888	Broken up, 1908

== Partenope class ==
Caprera soon after entering service in 1895

Design work on the Partenope class began in 1887, with Tripoli as the basis; the Goito-class cruisers had not yet entered service at that point, and so the navy had not gained any experience from the variations in their arrangements. Nevertheless, the design staff decided to standardize on the two-shaft arrangement adopted for Confienza, since it was a simpler and cheaper solution if it did not match the speed of the three-shaft systems. And with more powerful engines, the Partenope-class cruisers were faster than the three-shaft Goitos, reaching speeds as high as 20 knots (37 km/h; 23 mph). For their gun armament, the Partenopes also adopted the battery installed on Confienza, since the medium-caliber significantly increased her combat power. The designers conducted further tests with the ships' armaments, and Caprera received a second 4.7-inch gun.

Like the other Italian torpedo cruisers, the Partenope class spent much of its career with the fleet conducting training exercises. In the 1890s, Partenope and Euridice participated in naval demonstrations off Crete in attempts by the Great Powers to prevent conflicts between Greece and the Ottoman Empire over control of the island. By the mid-1900s, the class began to be withdrawn from front-line service. Partenope and Minerva were converted into minelayers in 1906–1908 and 1909–1910, respectively, and Calatafimi and Euridice were sold for scrap in 1907. Several members of the class saw action during the Italo-Turkish War, primarily shelling Ottoman positions in North Africa. Aretusa briefly engaged the Ottoman torpedo cruiser Peyk-i Şevket in the Red Sea.

After the war, the navy discarded Aretusa, Urania, and Caprera. The three surviving members of the class, Partenope, Minerva, and Iride, continued in service during World War I, but they saw limited activity due to the cautious strategy adopted by the Italian fleet. The two minelayers were tasked with laying defensive minefields in the Adriatic, and on 24 March 1918, the German U-boat UC-67 torpedoed and sank Partenope off Bizerte. Minerva and Iride were both scrapped in the early 1920s.

Summary of the Partenope class
Ship	Armament	Armor	Displacement	Propulsion	Service		
Ship	Armament	Armor	Displacement	Propulsion	Laid down	Commissioned	Fate
Partenope	5 × 17.7 in (450 mm) torpedo tubes 1 × 4.7 in gun	1.6 in (41 mm)	821 to 931 long tons (834 to 946 t)	2 shafts, triple-expansion steam engines, 18.1 to 20.8 kn (33.5 to 38.5 km/h; 20.8 to 23.9 mph)	8 June 1888	11 September 1890	Sunk, 24 March 1918
Minerva	6 × 17.7 in torpedo tubes 1 × 4.7 in gun	1.6 in (41 mm)	821 to 931 long tons (834 to 946 t)	2 shafts, triple-expansion steam engines, 18.1 to 20.8 kn (33.5 to 38.5 km/h; 20.8 to 23.9 mph)	1 February 1889	20 August 1892	Broken up, 1921
Euridice	6 × 17.7 in torpedo tubes 1 × 4.7 in gun	1.6 in (41 mm)	821 to 931 long tons (834 to 946 t)	2 shafts, triple-expansion steam engines, 18.1 to 20.8 kn (33.5 to 38.5 km/h; 20.8 to 23.9 mph)	14 February 1889	1 May 1891	Broken up, 1907
Urania	6 × 17.7 in torpedo tubes 1 × 4.7 in gun	1.6 in (41 mm)	821 to 931 long tons (834 to 946 t)	2 shafts, triple-expansion steam engines, 18.1 to 20.8 kn (33.5 to 38.5 km/h; 20.8 to 23.9 mph)	16 February 1889	21 July 1893	Broken up, 1912
Iride	6 × 17.7 in torpedo tubes 1 × 4.7 in gun	1.6 in (41 mm)	821 to 931 long tons (834 to 946 t)	2 shafts, triple-expansion steam engines, 18.1 to 20.8 kn (33.5 to 38.5 km/h; 20.8 to 23.9 mph)	21 February 1889	1 November 1892	Broken up, 1920
Aretusa	6 × 17.7 in torpedo tubes 1 × 4.7 in gun	1.6 in (41 mm)	821 to 931 long tons (834 to 946 t)	2 shafts, triple-expansion steam engines, 18.1 to 20.8 kn (33.5 to 38.5 km/h; 20.8 to 23.9 mph)	1 June 1889	1 September 1892	Broken up, 1912
Caprera	5 × 17.7 in torpedo tubes 2 × 4.7 in guns	1.6 in (41 mm)	821 to 931 long tons (834 to 946 t)	2 shafts, triple-expansion steam engines, 18.1 to 20.8 kn (33.5 to 38.5 km/h; 20.8 to 23.9 mph)	27 July 1891	12 December 1895	Broken up, 1913
Calatafimi	6 × 17.7 in torpedo tubes 1 × 4.7 in gun	1.6 in (41 mm)	821 to 931 long tons (834 to 946 t)	2 shafts, triple-expansion steam engines, 18.1 to 20.8 kn (33.5 to 38.5 km/h; 20.8 to 23.9 mph)	15 September 1891	16 January 1894	Broken up, 1907

== Agordat class ==
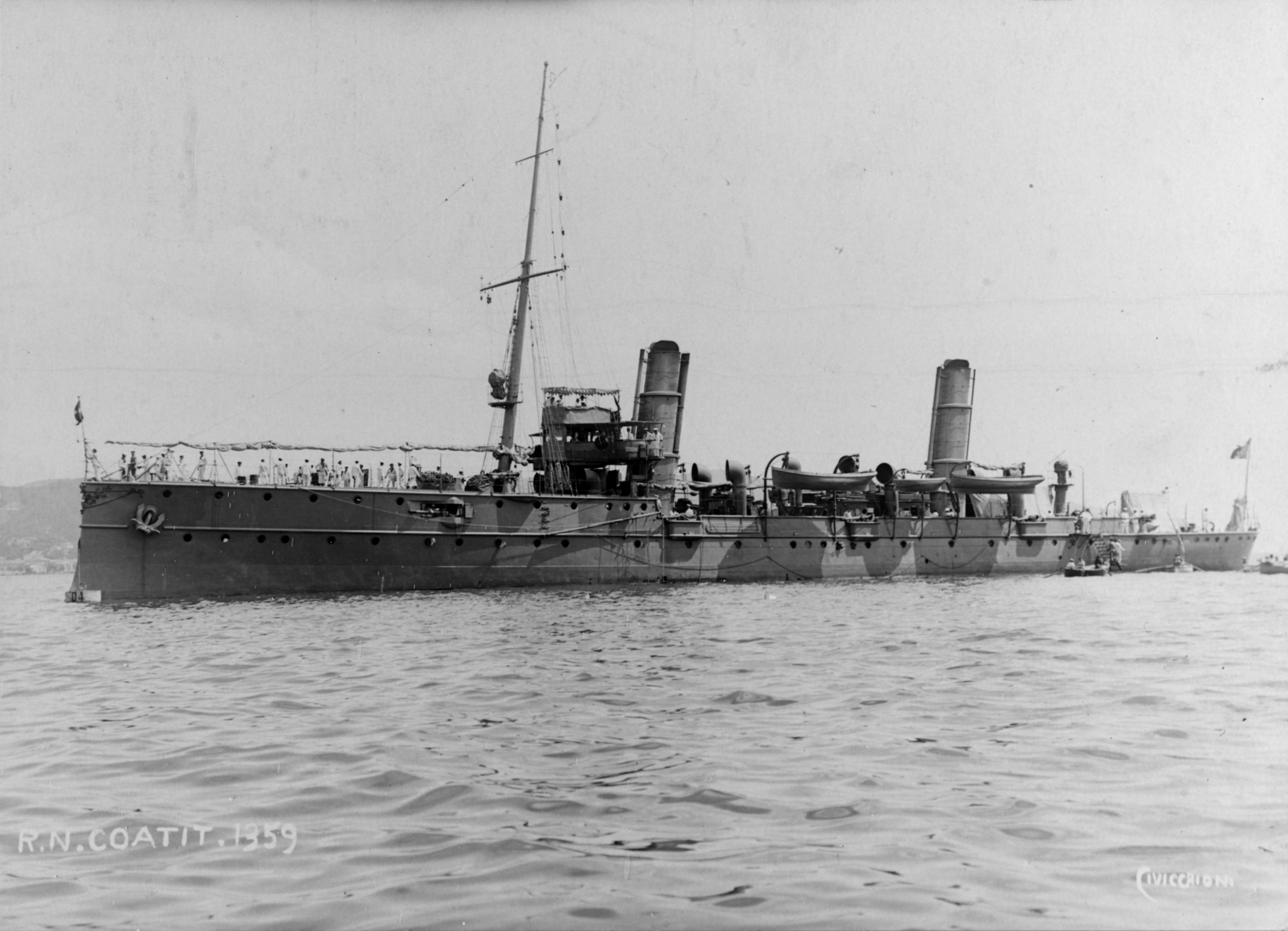
Coatit later in her career

The design for the Agordat class was prepared in the mid-1890s, with work beginning on the two new cruisers in early 1897. The two new cruisers were significantly larger than previous designs, though they discarded the medium-caliber guns that had been adopted in the Partenope design. The thickness of armor protection and the number of torpedo tubes were reduced as well. Intended to be scouts for the main battle fleet, Agordat and Coatit nevertheless proved to be too slow in service to be usable in that role. As a result, their careers were limited. They saw action during the Italo-Turkish War, where they provided gunfire support to Italian troops in North Africa. Neither ship saw combat during World War I, and after the war, they were withdrawn from fleet service. The Italian fleet received a group of former German and Austro-Hungarian light cruisers as war reparations, and these vessels replaced the torpedo and protected cruisers in the fleet's reconnaissance forces in the 1920s. Coatit became a minelayer, while Agordat was reclassified as a gunboat, in 1919 and 1920, respectively. Neither ship remained in service for very long, with Coatit being sold for scrap a year after her conversion, and Agordat joining her in 1923.

Summary of the Agordat class
Ship	Armament	Armor	Displacement	Propulsion	Service		
Ship	Armament	Armor	Displacement	Propulsion	Laid down	Commissioned	Fate
Agordat	2 × 17.7 in torpedo tubes	0.8 in (20 mm)	1,292 to 1,340 long tons (1,313 to 1,362 t)	2 shafts, triple-expansion steam engines, 22 to 23 kn (41 to 43 km/h; 25 to 26 mph)	18 February 1897	26 September 1900	Broken up, 1923
Coatit	2 × 17.7 in torpedo tubes	0.8 in (20 mm)	1,292 to 1,340 long tons (1,313 to 1,362 t)	2 shafts, triple-expansion steam engines, 22 to 23 kn (41 to 43 km/h; 25 to 26 mph)	8 April 1897	1 October 1900	Broken up, 1920
