= Italian ship Monzambano =

Monzambano was the name of at least two ships of the Italian Navy and may refer to:

- Italian cruiser Monzambano, a Goito-class cruiser launched in 1888 and scrapped in 1901
- Italian destroyer Monzambano, a Curtatone-class destroyer launched in 1923 and stricken in 1951
