= Italian ship Confienza =

Confienza was the name of at least two ships of the Italian Navy and may refer to:

- Italian cruiser Confienza, a Goito-class cruiser launched in 1889 and scrapped in 1901
- Italian destroyer Confienza, a Palestro-class destroyer launched in 1920 and sunk in 1940
