= Italian cruiser Umbria =

Protected cruiser of the Italian Royal Navy

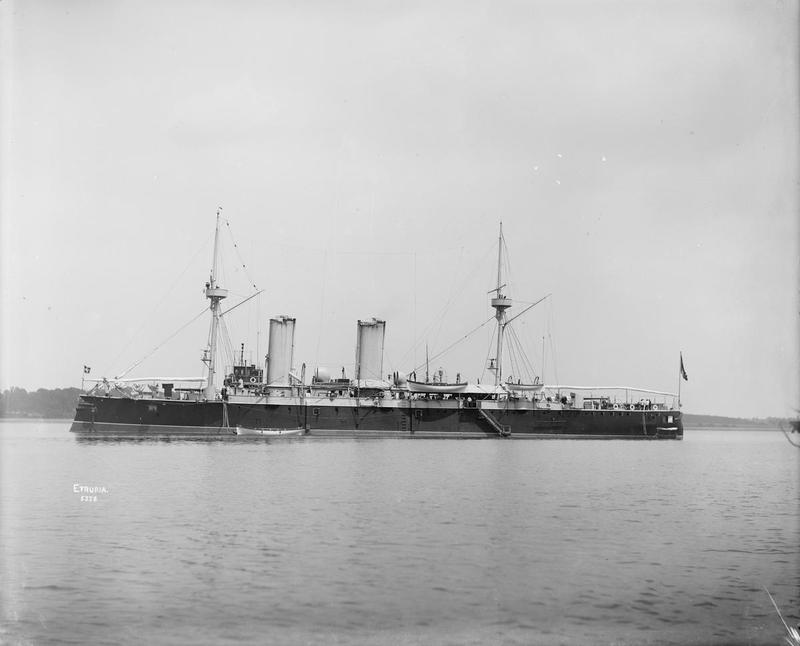
- Umbria's sister ship Etruria in 1895

History

Italy
- Name: Umbria
- Namesake: Region of Umbria
- Builder: Cantiere navale fratelli Orlando, Livorno
- Laid down: 1 August 1888
- Launched: 23 April 1891
- Commissioned: 16 February 1894
- Out of service: 1910
- Fate: Sold to Haiti, December 1910

History

Haiti
- Name: Consul Gostrück
- Acquired: December 1910
- Fate: Broken up, 1913

General characteristics
- Class & type: Regioni-class cruiser
- Displacement: Normal: 2,245 to 2,689 long tons (2,281 to 2,732 t); Full load: 2,411 to 3,110 long tons (2,450 to 3,160 t)
- Length: 84.8 m (278 ft 3 in)
- Beam: 12.03 m (39 ft 6 in)
- Draft: 5.35 m (17 ft 7 in)
- Installed power: 4 × fire-tube boilers; 5,536 ihp (4,128 kW)
- Propulsion: 2 × screw propellers; 2 × triple-expansion steam engines
- Speed: 18.1 knots (33.5 km/h; 20.8 mph)
- Range: 2,100 nmi (3,900 km; 2,400 mi) at 10 knots (19 km/h; 12 mph)
- Complement: 213–278
- Armament: 4 × 15 cm (5.9 in) guns; 6 × 12 cm (4.7 in) guns; 1 × 75 mm (3 in) gun; 8 × 57 mm (2.24 in) guns; 2 × 37 mm (1.5 in) guns; 2 × 450 mm (17.7 in) torpedo tubes
- Armor: Deck: 50 mm (2 in); Conning tower: 50 mm

Umbria was a protected cruiser of the Italian Regia Marina (Royal Navy) built in the 1890s. She was the lead ship of the Regioni class, which included five other vessels. All of the ships were named for current or former regions of Italy. The ship was equipped with a main armament of four 15 cm (5.9 in) and six 12 cm (4.7 in) guns, and she could steam at a speed of 18 knots (33 km/h; 21 mph). Umbria spent much of her career abroad, including several years in American waters. In service during a period of relative peace, Umbria never saw combat. In 1911, she was sold to Haiti and renamed Consul Gostrück, though she did not serve for very long under the Haitian flag. Her crew was too inexperienced to operate the ship, and she foundered shortly after being transferred to the Haitian Navy.

== Design ==
Plan and profile drawing of the Regioni class

Umbria was 84.8 meters (278 ft 3 in) long overall and had a beam of 12.03 m (39 ft 6 in) and a draft of 5.35 m (17 ft 7 in). Specific displacement figures have not survived for individual members of the class, but they displaced 2,245 to 2,689 long tons (2,281 to 2,732 t) normally and 2,411 to 3,110 long tons (2,450 to 3,160 t) at full load. The ships had a ram bow and a flush deck. Each vessel was fitted with a pair of pole masts. She had a crew of between 213 and 278.

Her propulsion system consisted of a pair of horizontal triple-expansion steam engines that drove two screw propellers. Steam was supplied by four cylindrical fire-tube boilers that were vented into two funnels. On her speed trials, she reached a maximum of 19 knots (35 km/h; 22 mph) at 7,400 indicated horsepower (5,500 kW). The ship had a cruising radius of about 2,100 nautical miles (3,900 km; 2,400 mi) at a speed of 10 knots (19 km/h; 12 mph).

Umbria was armed with a main battery of four 15 cm (5.9 in) L/40 guns mounted singly, with two side by side forward and two side by side aft. A secondary battery of six 12 cm (4.7 in) L/40 guns were placed between them, with three on each broadside. Close-range defense against torpedo boats consisted of one 75 mm (3 in) gun, eight 57 mm (2.24 in) guns, two 37 mm (1.5 in) guns, and a pair of machine guns. She was also equipped with two 450 mm (17.7 in) torpedo tubes. Umbria was protected by a 50 mm (2 in) thick deck, and her conning tower had 50 mm thick sides.

== Service history ==
Umbria was built by the Cantiere navale fratelli Orlando shipyard in Livorno. Her keel was laid down on 1 August 1888. Shortages of funding slowed the completion of Umbria and her sister ships. Tight budgets forced the navy to reduce the pace of construction so that the funds could be used to keep the active fleet in service. As a result, her hull was not ready to be launched until 23 April 1891, and fitting-out work took another almost three years to complete. Umbria finally joined the fleet on 16 February 1894. After entering service, she was stationed in Taranto along with the ironclads Affondatore and Ancona, the protected cruisers Liguria and Etruria, the torpedo cruisers Monzambano, Montebello, and Confienza, and several other vessels. She remained there through 1894. On 1 February 1897, Umbria was assigned to the Cruiser Squadron of the main Italian fleet, along with her sister Liguria and the cruisers Marco Polo and Dogali. Later that year, Umbria and Dogali cruised off the eastern coast of South America. In 1902, Umbria was part of a squadron with the protected cruisers Calabria and Giovanni Bausan in American waters.

In September 1904, Umbria stopped in Rio de Janeiro, Brazil, to supervise the transfer of sailors who had been killed by a yellow fever outbreak on her sister Lombardia in 1896. The men, 134 in all, had been buried in various cemeteries, but were re-interred in a large mausoleum in São Francisco Xavier. On 29 December, Umbria stopped in Valparaíso, where she met the German cruiser SMS Falke and the United States' cruisers USS New York and USS Marblehead and the gunboat USS Bennington. In June 1905, Umbria represented Italy at the Lewis and Clark Centennial Exposition in Portland, Oregon. She was joined there by the United States' cruisers USS Chicago and USS Boston. She visited San Diego, California in August exchanging salutes and visits with the commander of the coastal fortification outside the city. Two days after arriving, Umbria's captain, officers, and twenty crewmen went ashore and placed a wreath to commemorate the men who had been killed aboard the United States' gunboat Bennington in a boiler explosion. Umbria ran aground outside Kingston, Jamaica in July 1906, while en route from Puerto Rico. The salvage ship SS Premier assisted in pulling the ship free.

By 1910, the Regia Marina had decided to dispose of the obsolescent cruiser. Rumors that year of a potential sale to the Ecuadorian Navy prompted Peru to buy the old French cruiser Dupuy de Lôme, though Ecuador did not end up purchasing Umbria. Instead, in December 1910, the Regia Marina sold Umbria to the Haitian Navy, but she did not arrive in Port-de-Paix, Haiti, until 13 June 1911. After the sale, the ship was renamed Consul Gostrück. The ship was rumored to be carrying Cipriano Castro, the deposed president of Venezuela, though they later proved to be false. A German captain, Willy Meyer, was hired to take command of the ship upon her arrival in Haiti, but due to the lengthy delays, he quit. The cruiser sank shortly after entering service because her crew was not experienced in handling the ship. Consul Gostrück was eventually raised and towed to Rotterdam, the Netherlands, for disposal in 1913.
