= Italian cruiser Montebello =

Torpedo cruiser of the Italian Royal Navy

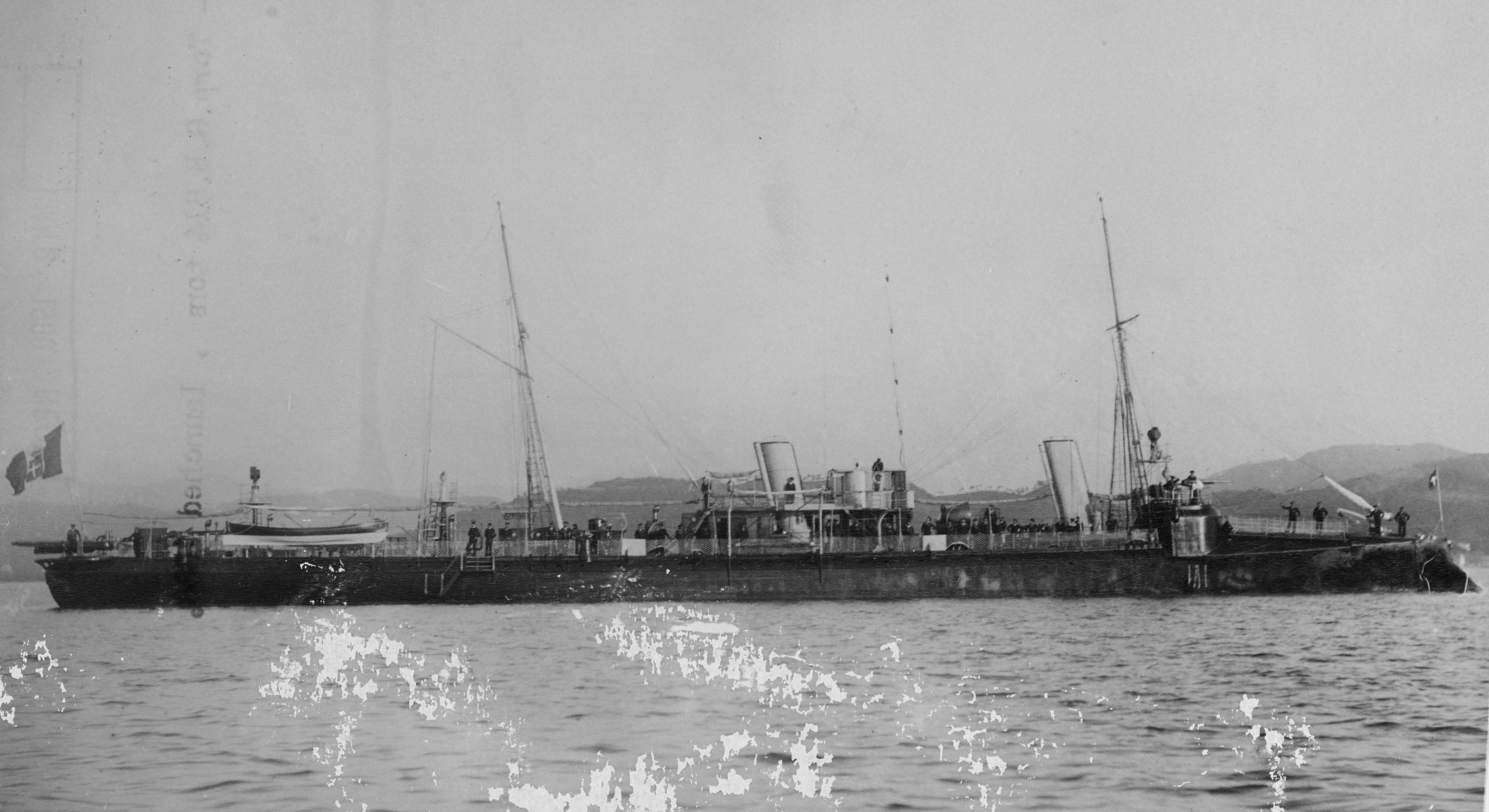
- Montebello early in her career

History

Kingdom of Italy
- Name: Montebello
- Builder: Arsenale di La Spezia
- Laid down: 25 September 1885
- Launched: 14 March 1888
- Commissioned: 21 January 1889
- Stricken: 26 January 1920
- Fate: Scrapped, 1920

General characteristics
- Class & type: Goito-class torpedo cruiser
- Displacement: 801 long tons (814 t)
- Length: 73.4 m (241 ft)
- Beam: 7.88 m (25.9 ft)
- Draft: 3.31 m (10.9 ft)
- Installed power: 6 × locomotive boilers; 2,500 to 3,180 indicated horsepower (1,860 to 2,370 kW)
- Propulsion: 3 × triple-expansion steam engines; 3 × screw propellers
- Speed: 18 kn (33 km/h; 21 mph)
- Range: 1,100 nautical miles (2,000 km; 1,300 mi) at 10 kn (19 km/h; 12 mph)
- Complement: 105–121
- Armament: 6 × 57 mm (2.24 in) guns; 2 × 37 mm (1.5 in) guns; 4 × 14 in (356 mm) torpedo tubes
- Armor: Deck: 1.5 in (38 mm)

Montebello was the second of four Goito-class torpedo cruisers built for the Italian Regia Marina (Royal Navy) in the 1880s. She was built at the Arsenale di La Spezia between September 1885 and January 1889, when she entered service. She was armed with a variety of light guns and four 14-inch (356 mm) torpedo tubes, and was capable of a top speed of 18 knots (33 km/h; 21 mph). Montebello spent her active-duty career with the main Italian fleet, where she frequently took part in annual training exercises. In 1903, she was withdrawn from front-line service and converted into a training ship for engine room personnel; she served in this capacity until 1920, when she was sold for scrap.

== Design ==
Montebello was 73.4 meters (241 ft) long overall and had a beam of 7.88 m (25.9 ft) and an average draft of 3.31 m (10.9 ft). She displaced 801 long tons (814 t) normally. Her propulsion system consisted of three triple-expansion steam engines each driving a single screw propeller, with steam supplied by six coal-fired locomotive boilers. Exact figures for the ship's performance have not survived, but the members of the Goito class could steam at a speed of about 18 knots (33 km/h; 21 mph) from 2,500 to 3,180 indicated horsepower (1,860 to 2,370 kW). Montebello had a cruising radius of 1,100 nautical miles (2,000 km; 1,300 mi) at a speed of 10 knots (19 km/h; 12 mph). She had a crew of between 105 and 121.

The primary armament for Montebello was four 14 in (356 mm) torpedo tubes. She carried a light gun battery for defense against torpedo boats. This consisted of six 57 mm (2.24 in) 40-caliber guns and two 37 mm (1.5 in) 20-cal. guns, all mounted singly. The ship was protected with an armored deck that was 1.5 in (38 mm) thick.

== Service history ==
The keel for Montebello was laid down at the Arsenale di La Spezia shipyard on 25 September 1885. She was launched on 14 March 1888 and completed on 21 January 1889. In 1893, Montebello was laid up in Naples for the year; at the time, the Italian fleet mobilized only a handful of vessels for the annual training maneuvers, preferring to keep the most modern vessels in reserve to reduce maintenance costs. On 1 October, she was stationed in Taranto along with the ironclads Affondatore and Ancona, the protected cruisers Liguria, Umbria, and Etruria, the torpedo cruisers Monzambano and Confienza, and several other vessels. She remained there through 1894.

In 1895, Montebello was stationed in the 2nd Maritime Department, split between Taranto and Naples, along with most of the torpedo cruisers in the Italian fleet. These included her sister ships Monzambano, Goito, and Confienza, the eight Partenope-class cruisers, and Tripoli. Montebello joined the 1st Division of the active fleet in 1897, which also included the ironclads Re Umberto, Sardegna, and Sicilia, the protected cruisers Giovanni Bausan and Vesuvio, and the torpedo cruiser Euridice. In 1898, Montebello was assigned to the Levant Squadron that patrolled the eastern Mediterranean. She served on the station with Sardegna, Etruria, Monzambano, and the torpedo cruiser Aretusa.

Later in 1898, Montebello was withdrawn from front-line service and employed as a training ship for engine room personnel. In 1903, her boilers were replaced with a variety of coal and oil-burning boilers manufactured by Pattison, Yarrow, and Thornycroft to give trainees several types of equipment to operate. At the outbreak of the Italo-Turkish War in September 1911, Montebello was stationed in Venice along with Tripoli and Goito. None of the vessels saw action during the war. The ship did not see action after Italy entered World War I either, as both the Italian and Austro-Hungarian fleets adopted cautious strategies. Montebello continued in service as a training ship until 26 January 1920, when she was stricken from the naval register and broken up for scrap.
