= Italian cruiser Monzambano =

Torpedo cruiser of the Italian Royal Navy

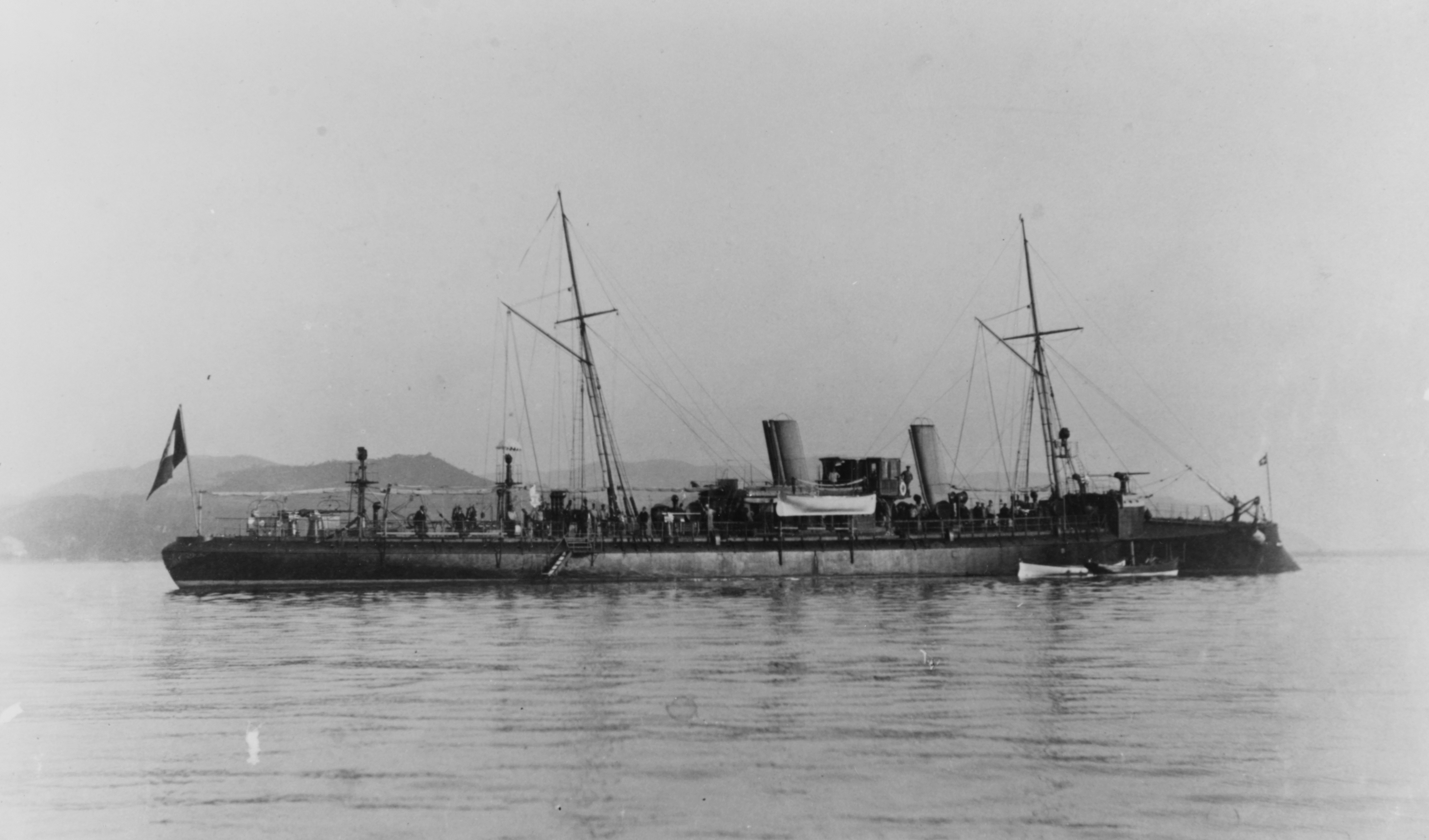
- Monzambanoshortly after entering service in 1889

History

Kingdom of Italy
- Name: Monzambano
- Builder: Arsenale di La Spezia
- Laid down: 25 August 1885
- Launched: 14 March 1888
- Commissioned: 11 August 1889
- Stricken: 26 August 1901
- Fate: Broken up, 1901

General characteristics
- Class & type: Goito-class torpedo cruiser
- Displacement: 856 long tons (870 t)
- Length: 73.4 m (241 ft)
- Beam: 7.88 m (25.9 ft)
- Draft: 3.5 m (11 ft)
- Installed power: 4 × locomotive boilers; 2,500 to 3,180 indicated horsepower (1,860 to 2,370 kW)
- Propulsion: 3 × double-expansion steam engines; 3 × screw propellers
- Speed: 18 kn (33 km/h; 21 mph)
- Range: 1,100 nautical miles (2,000 km; 1,300 mi) at 10 kn (19 km/h; 12 mph)
- Complement: 105–121
- Armament: 6 × 57 mm (2.24 in) guns; 5 × 14 in (356 mm) torpedo tubes
- Armor: Deck: 1.5 in (38 mm)

Monzambano was a torpedo cruiser of the Goito class built for the Italian Regia Marina (Royal Navy) in the 1880s. The ship was built at the Arsenale di La Spezia, beginning with her keel laying in August 1885 and ending with her completion in August 1889. She was armed with a variety of light guns and five 14-inch (356 mm) torpedo tubes, and was capable of a top speed of 18 knots (33 km/h; 21 mph). The ship spent her career in the main Italian fleet conducting training exercises, and did not see action. She spent 1898 patrolling the eastern Mediterranean Sea with the Levant Squadron. Monzambano was withdrawn from service in 1901 and broken up for scrap that year.

== Design ==
Monzambano was 73.4 meters (241 ft) long overall and had a beam of 7.88 m (25.9 ft) and an average draft of 3.31 m (10.9 ft). She displaced 856 long tons (870 t) normally. Her propulsion system consisted of three double-expansion steam engines each driving a single screw propeller, with steam supplied by four coal-fired locomotive boilers. Exact figures for the ship's performance have not survived, but the members of the Goito class could steam at a speed of about 18 knots (33 km/h; 21 mph) from 2,500 to 3,180 indicated horsepower (1,860 to 2,370 kW). Monzambano had a cruising radius of 1,100 nautical miles (2,000 km; 1,300 mi) at a speed of 10 knots (19 km/h; 12 mph). She had a crew of between 105 and 121.

The primary armament for Monzambano was five 14 in (356 mm) torpedo tubes. She carried a light gun battery for defense against torpedo boats. This consisted of six 57 mm (2.24 in) 40-caliber guns, which were mounted singly. The ship was protected with an armored deck that was 1.5 in (38 mm) thick.

== Service history ==
Monzambano was laid down at the Arsenale di La Spezia on 25 August 1885, the first member of her class to begin construction. She was launched on 14 March 1888 and fitting-out work was completed on 11 August 1889. In 1893, Monzambano was laid up in La Spezia for the year, along with several other torpedo cruisers of the Partenope class, her sister Goito, and Pietro Micca; at the time, the Italian fleet mobilized only a handful of vessels for the annual training maneuvers, preferring to keep the most modern vessels in reserve to reduce maintenance costs. That year, Monzambano was activated for the major fleet maneuvers conducted in July with the 1st Division, with the ironclad battleships Lepanto and Ruggiero di Lauria, the torpedo cruiser Euridice, and four torpedo boats. She served in the attacking squadron during a set of exercises that simulated a French attack on Naples. On 1 October, she was stationed in Taranto along with the ironclads Affondatore and Ancona, the protected cruisers Liguria, Umbria, and Etruria, the torpedo cruisers Montebello and Confienza, and several other vessels. She remained there through 1894.

In 1895, Monzambano was stationed in the 2nd Maritime Department, split between Taranto and Naples, along with most of the torpedo cruisers in the Italian fleet. These included her sister ships Goito, Montebello, and Confienza, the eight Partenope-class cruisers, and Tripoli. In 1898, Monzambano was assigned to the Levant Squadron that patrolled the eastern Mediterranean. She served on the station with the ironclad battleship Sardegna, the protected cruiser Etruria, Montebello, and the torpedo cruiser Aretusa. The ship was stricken on 26 August 1901 and broken up for scrap.
