= Italian ironclad Ancona =

Ironclad warship of the Italian Royal Navy

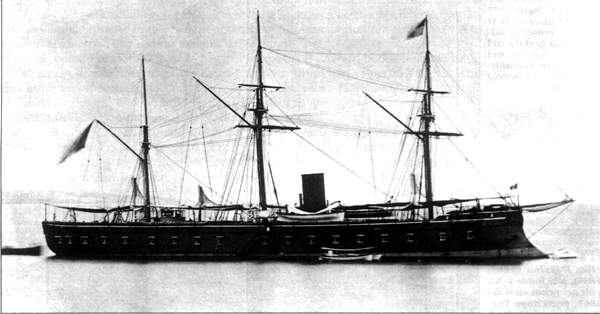
- Ancona in Naples, 1870

History

Italy
- Name: Ancona
- Namesake: Ancona
- Builder: Arman Brothers, Bordeaux, France
- Laid down: 11 August 1862
- Launched: 17 October 1864
- Completed: April 1866
- Stricken: 1903
- Fate: Broken up

General characteristics
- Class & type: Regina Maria Pia-class ironclad
- Displacement: Normal: 4,157 long tons (4,224 t); Full load: 4,619 long tons (4,693 t)
- Length: 81.8 m (268 ft 4 in)
- Beam: 15.16 m (49 ft 9 in)
- Draft: 6.35 m (20 ft 10 in)
- Installed power: 8 rectangular boilers; 2,548 ihp (1,900 kW)
- Propulsion: 1 × marine steam engine; 1 × screw propeller
- Speed: 13.74 knots (25.45 km/h; 15.81 mph)
- Range: 2,600 nmi (4,800 km) at 10 kn (19 km/h; 12 mph)
- Complement: 480–485
- Armament: 4 × 203 mm (8 in) guns; 22 × 164 mm (6 in) guns
- Armor: Belt armor: 121 mm (4.75 in); Battery: 109 mm (4.3 in)

Ancona was an ironclad warship, the last member of the Regina Maria Pia class built in French shipyards for the Italian Regia Marina (Royal Navy) in the 1860s. Ancona was laid down in August 1862, was launched in October 1864, and completed in April 1866. She and her three sister ships were broadside ironclads, mounting a battery of four 203 mm (8 in) and twenty-two 164 mm (6.5 in) guns on the broadside.

Ancona was quickly readied for combat when Italy declared war against the Austrian Empire in the Third Italian War of Independence in June 1866. The following month, she joined the Italian fleet at the Battle of Lissa. She was stationed in the van of the Italian fleet, which became separated from the rest of the fleet. Ancona was damaged by Austrian shellfire, including one shell that started a fire. Her career was uneventful after the war, resulting from a combination of the emergence of more modern ironclads and a severe reduction in the Italian naval budget following their defeat at Lissa. She was rebuilt as a central battery ship some time after Lissa, and was eventually sold for scrapping in 1903.

== Design ==
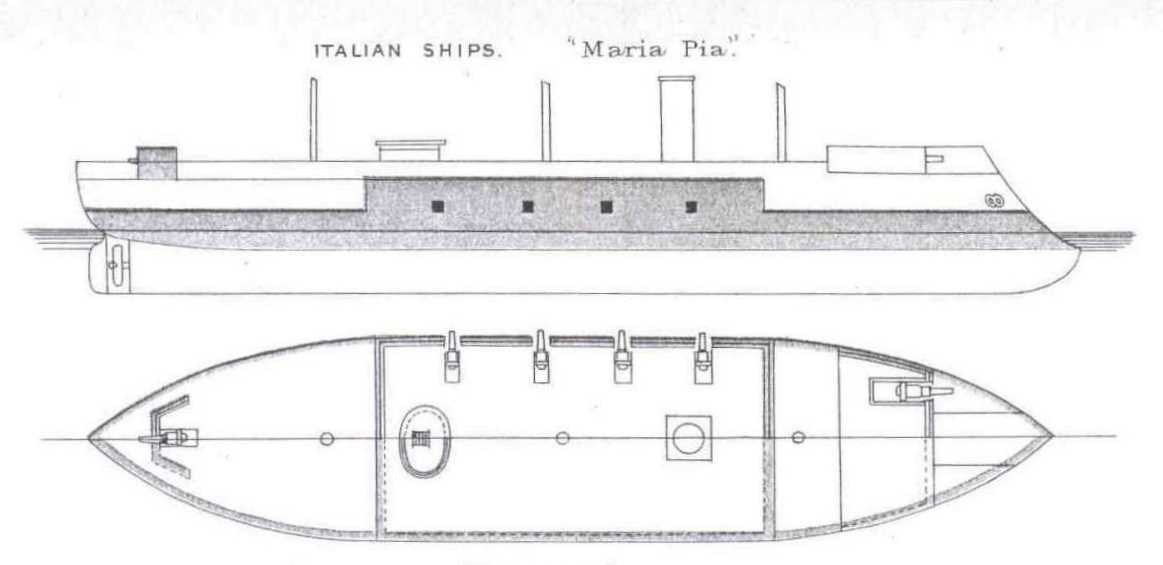
Plan and profile drawing of Regina Maria Pia in her 1888 configuration

In 1862, the Italian Regia Marina (Royal Navy) ordered four new ironclads from French shipyards, in the context of the Austro-Italian ironclad arms race. At the time, the new Kingdom of Italy expected another war with the Austrian Empire, having last fought the Austrians in 1859 during the Second Italian War of Independence. The four Regina Maria Pia-class ships were designed by their French builders, and were completed to slightly varying pairs: Ancona and Castelfidardo; and Regina Maria Pia and San Martino.

Ancona was 81.8 meters (268 ft) long overall; she had a beam of 15.16 m (49.7 ft) and an average draft of 6.35 m (20.8 ft). She displaced 4,157 long tons (4,224 t) normally and up to 4,619 long tons (4,693 t) at full load. The ship had an inverted bow with a pronounced ram below the waterline. She had a crew of 480–485 officers and men.

Her propulsion system consisted of one single-expansion steam engine that drove a single screw propeller. Steam was supplied by eight coal-burning, rectangular fire-tube boilers that were vented through a single funnel. Her engine produced a top speed of 13.74 knots (25.45 km/h; 15.81 mph) from 2,548 indicated horsepower (1,900 kW), making her the fastest member of her class. She could steam for 2,600 nautical miles (4,800 km; 3,000 mi) at a speed of 10 knots (19 km/h; 12 mph). The ship was initially schooner-rigged to supplement the steam engine, though her masts were later reduced to a barque rig. Ultimately, she lost her sailing rig completely, having it replaced with a pair of military masts with fighting tops.

Ancona was a broadside ironclad, and she was initially armed with a main battery of four 203 mm (8 in) guns and twenty-two 164 mm (6.5 in) guns, though her armament changed throughout her career. The ship was protected by iron belt armor that was 109 mm (4.3 in) thick and extended for the entire length of the hull at the waterline. The side armor extended up to the battery deck with the same thickness of iron plate.

== Service history ==
Ancona was laid down at the Arman Brothers shipyard in Bordeaux, France on 11 August 1862, the last member of her class to begin construction. She was launched on 17 October 1864 and completed in April 1866. Two months later, in June, Italy declared war on Austria, as part of the Third Italian War of Independence, which was fought concurrently with the Austro-Prussian War. The Italian fleet commander, Admiral Carlo Pellion di Persano, initially adopted a cautious course of action; he was unwilling to risk battle with the Austrian Navy, despite the fact that the Austrian fleet was much weaker than his own. Persano claimed he was simply waiting on the ironclad ram Affondatore, en route from Britain, but his inaction weakened morale in the fleet, with many of his subordinates openly accusing him of cowardice.

Rear Admiral Wilhelm von Tegetthoff brought the Austrian fleet to Ancona on June 27, in attempt to draw out the Italians. At the time, many of the Italian ships were in disarray; several ships did not have their entire armament, and several others had problems with their engines. Ancona, having entered service only two months before, was not yet ready for combat. Persano held a council of war aboard the ironclad Principe di Carignano to determine whether he should sortie to engage Tegetthoff, but by that time, the Austrians had withdrawn, making the decision moot. The Minister of the Navy, Agostino Depretis, urged Persano to act and suggested the island of Lissa, to restore Italian confidence after their defeat at the Battle of Custoza the previous month. On 7 July, Persano left Ancona and conducted a sweep into the Adriatic, but encountered no Austrian ships and returned on the 13th.

=== Battle of Lissa ===
Map showing the disposition of the fleets on 20 July

On 16 July, Persano took the Italian fleet out of Ancona, bound for Lissa, where they arrived on the 18th. With them, they brought troop transports carrying 3,000 soldiers; the Italian warships began bombarding the Austrian forts on the island, with the intention of landing the soldiers once the fortresses had been silenced. In response, the Austrian Navy sent the fleet under Tegetthoff to attack the Italian ships. Ancona was at that time assigned to the 1st Division, commanded by Admiral Giovanni Vacca, along with the ironclads Castelfidardo and Principe di Carignano, the divisional flagship. After arriving off Lissa on the 18th, Persano ordered the 1st Division to bombard the Austrian fortresses protecting the island, but to retain their steel shells for an expected confrontation with the Austrian fleet. Ancona attacked the Perlic battery that formed part of the defenses of Port Comiso. Vacca erroneously believed that his ships' guns could not elevate high enough to hit the high fortifications. Persano then sent Vacca's division to Vis to force the harbor defenses, but by the time they arrived, night was approaching, and so he cancelled the attack.

The next morning, Persano ordered the ironclad Formidabile to enter the harbor Vis and attack the Madonna battery, supported by Ancona and the rest of the 1st Division. Vacca found it impossible to employ his ships in the confined waters, and they received heavy fire from the Austrian guns. Ancona received particularly damaging hits, one of which nearly broke off one of her armor plates. She was set on fire, suffering six killed and nineteen wounded men, prompting Vacca to break off and withdraw his three ironclads, leaving Formidabile to handle the battery. Later that evening, Vacca took Principe di Carignano, Castelfidardo, and Anconca back to Comisa, but he did little more than probe the bay before Austrian fire prompted his withdrawal. With the day's attacks again having yielded no results, Persano met with his senior officers to discuss options. His chief of staff, d'Amico, and Vacca both suggested a withdrawal owing to the shortage of coal, but Persano ruled that out. He ultimately decided to make another attempt on the 20th. Vacca would take his three ships to patrol to the north-east of the island while the rest of the fleet would again try to land the soldiers.

Before the Italians could begin the attack, but after the fleet had begun to disperse for the landing operation, the dispatch boat Esploratore arrived, bringing news of Tegetthoff's approach. Persano's fleet was in disarray; Vacca's ships were three miles to the northeast from Persano's main force, and three other ironclads were further away to the west. Persano immediately ordered his ships to form up with Vacca's, first in line abreast formation, and then in line ahead formation. Ancona was the third ship in the Italian line.

Shortly before the action began, Persano left his flagship, Re d'Italia, and transferred to the turret ship Affondatore, though none of his subordinates on the other ships were aware of the change. They there thus left to fight as individuals without direction. More dangerously, by stopping Re d'Italia, he allowed a significant gap to open up between Vacca's three ships and the rest of the fleet. Tegetthoff took his fleet through the gap between Vacca's and Persano's ships, in an attempt to split the Italian line and initiate a melee. He failed to ram any Italian vessels on the first pass, so he turned back toward Persano's ships, and took Re d'Italia, San Martino, and Palestro under heavy fire. Vacca turned his division to port, taking them away from the Austrian ships hammering Persano's division. He briefly attempted to engage the Austrian wooden ships under Anton von Petz in the rear, but was driven off by heavy fire from three steam frigates.

By this time, Re d'Italia had been badly damaged, and she attempted to close up with Ancona. While she reversed course to meet Ancona, the ship was rammed and sunk by the Austrian flagship, SMS Erzherzog Ferdinand Max. Ancona was set on fire by Austrian shells, but her crew quickly put them out. Ancona then rallied with the coastal defense ship Varese to make another attack on von Petz's unarmored ships, but the two Italian vessels collided and became entangled. While their crews worked to free the ships, the Austrians were able to escape. Persano broke off the engagement to consolidate his forces, but his ships, low on coal and ammunition, and with badly demoralized crews, could not be rallied by Persano's half-hearted attempt to launch an attack. The Italian fleet began to withdraw, followed by the Austrians; as night began to fall, the opposing fleets disengaged completely, heading for Ancona and Pola, respectively. In the course of the battle, Ancona had been hit many times, with several of her iron plates having been dislodged. An Austrian shell managed to enter one of her gun ports and explode inside.

After the battle, Vacca replaced Persano; he was ordered to attack the main Austrian naval base at Pola, but the war ended before the operation could be carried out.

=== Later career ===
For the rest of her long career, Ancona served in a variety of roles, both in the main fleet and in Italy's colonial empire. After the end of the war, the government lost confidence in the fleet and drastically reduced the naval budget. The cuts were so severe that the fleet had great difficulty in mobilizing its ironclad squadron to attack the port of Civitavecchia in September 1870, as part of the wars of Italian unification. Instead, the ships were laid up and the sailors conscripted to man them were sent home. Some time after 1866, the ship was rebuilt as a central battery ship, with most of her guns located in a central, armored casemate. Two other guns were placed in the bow as chase guns, with a third mounted as a stern chaser. At around 1871, her armament was also revised, to two 254 mm (10 in) guns in the bow and nine 203 mm guns, four on each broadside and the last in the stern. Later, her armament was changed again, to eight 152 mm (6 in) guns, six 120 mm (4.7 in) guns, four 57 mm (2.2 in) quick firing (QF) guns, and two 37 mm (1.5 in) Hotchkiss revolver cannons. By October that year, the ship was stationed in Genoa.

In 1873, the ship was assigned to the 1st Division of the main Italian fleet unit, the Permanent Squadron; the other vessels of the division were the ironclads Roma and Conte Verde. Together with the ships of the 2nd Division, the entire squadron cruised in the Mediterranean that year. On 10 June 1887, the annual fleet maneuvers began; Ancona was assigned to the "attacking squadron", along with the ironclads San Martino and Duilio, the protected cruiser Giovanni Bausan, and several smaller vessels. The first half of the maneuvers tested the ability to attack and defend the Strait of Messina, and concluded in time for a fleet review by King Umberto I on the 21st. As of 1 October 1893, she was stationed in Taranto along with Affondatore, the protected cruisers Liguria, Etruria, and Umbria, the torpedo cruisers Monzambano, Montebello, and Confienza, and several other vessels. She remained there through 1894. She was used as a harbor guard ship in Taranto through 1895. Ancona was stricken from the naval register in 1903 and then broken up for scrap.
