= Italian cruiser Confienza =

Torpedo cruiser of the Italian Royal Navy

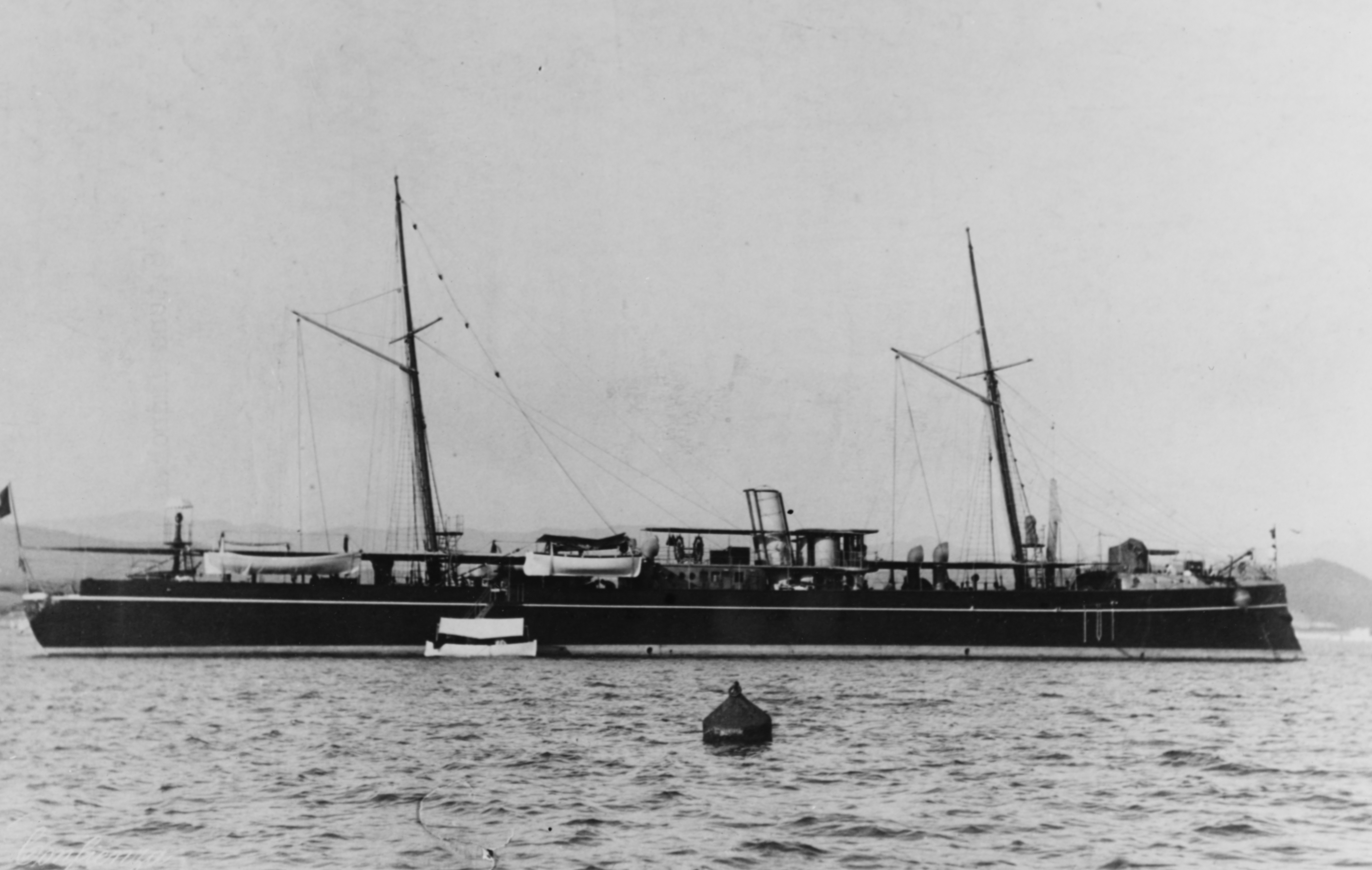
- Confienza

History

Kingdom of Italy
- Name: Confienza
- Builder: Arsenale di La Spezia
- Laid down: September 1887
- Launched: 28 July 1889
- Commissioned: 11 April 1890
- Stricken: 26 August 1901
- Fate: Broken up, 1901

General characteristics
- Class & type: Goito-class torpedo cruiser
- Displacement: 756 long tons (768 t)
- Length: 73.4 m (241 ft)
- Beam: 8.05 m (26.4 ft)
- Draft: 3.04 m (10.0 ft)
- Installed power: 4 × locomotive boilers; 1,962 indicated horsepower (1,463 kW)
- Propulsion: 2 × double-expansion steam engines; 2 × screw propellers
- Speed: 17 kn (31 km/h; 20 mph)
- Range: 1,100 nautical miles (2,000 km; 1,300 mi) at 10 kn (19 km/h; 12 mph)
- Complement: 105–121
- Armament: 1 × 4.7 in (120 mm) gun; 6 × 57 mm (2.24 in) guns; 2 × 37 mm (1.5 in) guns; 5 × 14 in (356 mm) torpedo tubes
- Armor: Deck: 1.5 in (38 mm)

Confienza was the last of four Goito-class torpedo cruisers built for the Italian Regia Marina (Royal Navy) in the 1880s. She was armed with a variety of light guns and five 14-inch (356 mm) torpedo tubes, and was capable of a top speed of 17 knots (31 km/h; 20 mph). The ship was built in the late 1880s, with her keel laying in September 1887 at the Arsenale di La Spezia; she was completed in April 1890 and thereafter entered service with the Italian fleet. Confienza had a short and uneventful career; she spent her time in Italian waters and did not see any action. Stricken from the naval register in August 1901, she was thereafter broken up for scrap.

== Design ==
Confienza was 73.4 meters (241 ft) long overall and had a beam of 8.05 m (26.4 ft) and an average draft of 3.04 m (10.0 ft). She displaced 756 long tons (768 t) normally. Her propulsion system consisted of two double-expansion steam engines each driving a single screw propeller, with steam supplied by four coal-fired locomotive boilers. Confienza was slightly slower than her three sister ships, with a top speed of 17 knots (31 km/h; 20 mph) from 1,962 indicated horsepower (1,463 kW); the other members of her class were a knot faster. Confienza had a cruising radius of 1,100 nautical miles (2,000 km; 1,300 mi) at a speed of 10 knots (19 km/h; 12 mph). She had a crew of between 105 and 121.

The primary armament for Confienza was five 14 in (356 mm) torpedo tubes. She carried a heavier gun armament than her sisters, and was the only vessel of the class to carry a medium-caliber weapon, a single 4.7-inch (120 mm) 32-caliber (cal.) gun mounted on the bow. She also carried a light gun battery for defense against torpedo boats. This consisted of six 57 mm (2.24 in) 40-cal. guns and two 37 mm (1.5 in) 20-cal. guns, all mounted singly. The ship was protected with an armored deck that was 1.5 in (38 mm) thick.

== Service history ==
The keel for Confienza was laid down at the Arsenale di La Spezia in September 1887, the last member of her class to begin construction. She was launched on 28 July 1889, and fitting-out work was completed on 11 April 1890. She then began her sea trials, which concluded in June. On 1 October, she was stationed in Taranto along with the ironclads Affondatore and Ancona, the protected cruisers Liguria, Umbria, and Etruria, the torpedo cruisers Montebello and Monzambano, and several other vessels. She remained there through 1894. Later in 1894, the ship was assigned to the Third Division of the Italian fleet, along with the ironclad San Martino and the newly commissioned protected cruiser Liguria. The following year, Confienza was stationed in the 2nd Maritime Department, split between Taranto and Naples, along with most of the torpedo cruisers in the Italian fleet. These included her sister ships Monzambano, Montebello, and Goito, the eight Partenope-class cruisers, and Tripoli.

The ship was stationed in Naples in 1900, along with the old ironclads Regina Maria Pia, Castelfidardo, and Affondatore, the armored cruiser Marco Polo, the other three Goito-class cruisers, Tripoli, and the two new Agordat-class cruisers. Confienza's career was the shortest of the members of her class, having spent just over a decade in service before she was stricken from the naval register on 26 August 1901 and broken up for scrap.
