= Italian cruiser Goito =

Torpedo cruiser of the Italian Royal Navy

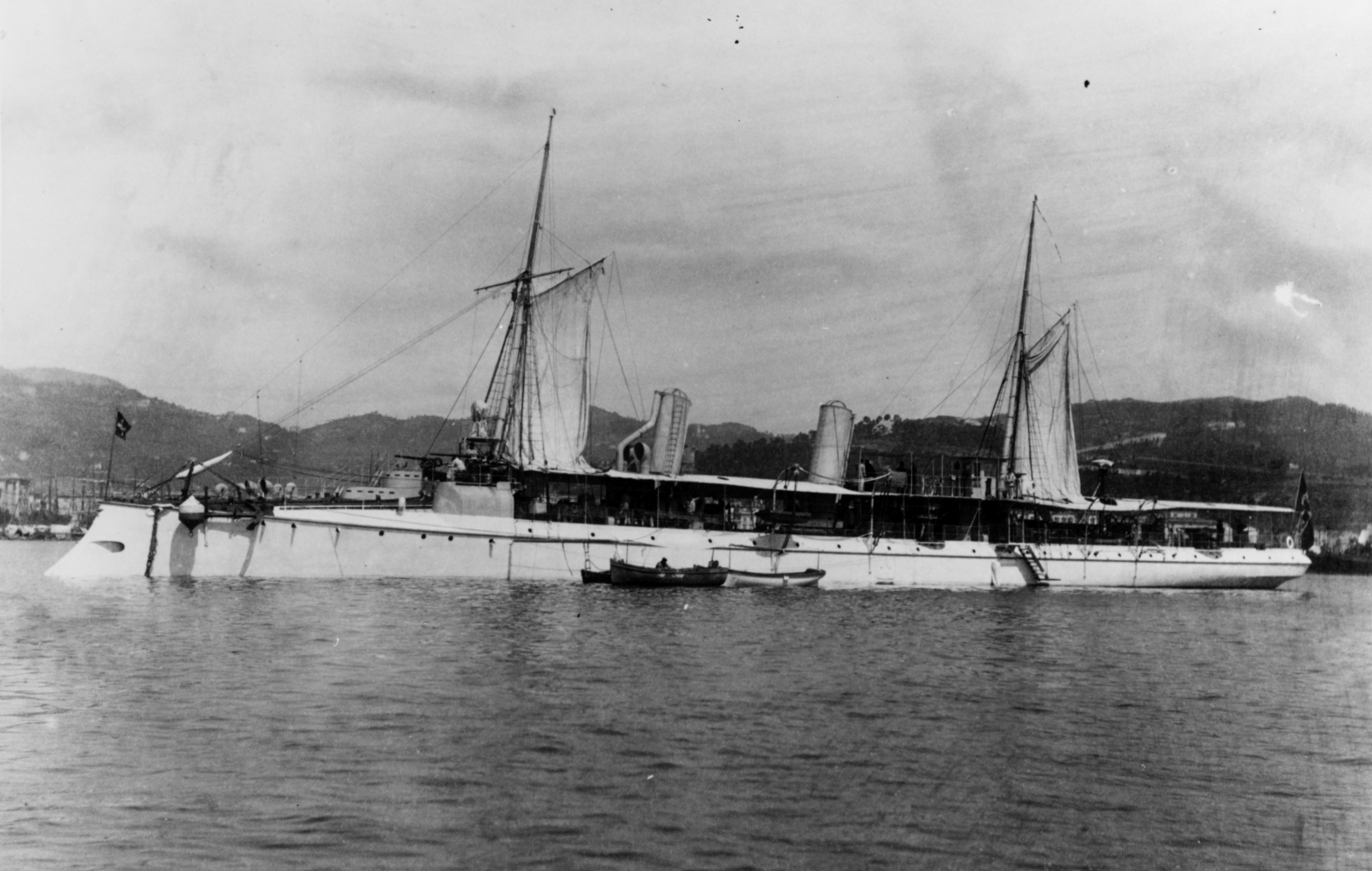
- Goito early in her career

History

Kingdom of Italy
- Name: Goito
- Builder: Regio Cantiere di Castellammare di Stabia
- Laid down: September 1885
- Launched: 6 July 1887
- Commissioned: 16 February 1888
- Stricken: 15 March 1920
- Fate: Scrapped, 1920

General characteristics
- Class & type: Goito-class torpedo cruiser
- Displacement: 829 long tons (842 t)
- Length: 73.4 m (241 ft)
- Beam: 7.88 m (25.9 ft)
- Draft: 3.6 m (12 ft)
- Installed power: 6 × locomotive boilers; 2,500 to 3,180 indicated horsepower (1,860 to 2,370 kW)
- Propulsion: 3 × double-expansion steam engines; 3 × screw propellers
- Speed: 18 kn (33 km/h; 21 mph)
- Range: 1,100 nautical miles (2,000 km; 1,300 mi) at 10 kn (19 km/h; 12 mph)
- Complement: 105–121
- Armament: 5 × 57 mm (2.24 in) guns; 2 × 37 mm (1.5 in) guns; 3 × 37 mm Hotchkiss guns; 5 × 14 in (356 mm) torpedo tubes
- Armor: Deck: 1.5 in (38 mm)

Goito was a torpedo cruiser built for the Italian Regia Marina (Royal Navy) in the 1880s. She was the lead ship of the Goito class, which included three other vessels. Goito was built by the Regio Cantiere di Castellammare di Stabia shipyard between September 1885 and February 1888. She was armed with a variety of light guns and five 14-inch (356 mm) torpedo tubes, and was capable of a top speed of 18 knots (33 km/h; 21 mph). The ship served the duration of her career in the main Italian fleet. Her early service was primarily occupied with training exercises; front-line duties ended in 1897 when she was converted into a minelayer, though she continued to participate in fleet exercises. During World War I, Goito laid defensive minefields in the Adriatic Sea. She was eventually sold for scrap in 1920 and broken up.

== Design ==
Goito was 73.4 meters (241 ft) long overall and had a beam of 7.88 m (25.9 ft) and an average draft of 3.6 m (12 ft). She displaced 829 long tons (842 t) normally. Her propulsion system consisted of three double-expansion steam engines each driving a single screw propeller, with steam supplied by six coal-fired locomotive boilers. Exact figures for the ship's performance have not survived, but the members of the Goito class could steam at a speed of about 18 knots (33 km/h; 21 mph) from 2,500 to 3,180 indicated horsepower (1,860 to 2,370 kW). Goito had a cruising radius of 1,100 nautical miles (2,000 km; 1,300 mi) at a speed of 10 knots (19 km/h; 12 mph). She had a crew of between 105 and 121.

The primary armament for Goito was five 14 in (356 mm) torpedo tubes. She carried a light gun battery for defense against torpedo boats. This consisted of five 57 mm (2.24 in) 40-caliber guns, two 37 mm (1.5 in) 20-cal. guns, and three 37 mm revolving Hotchkiss guns, all mounted singly. The ship was protected with an armored deck that was 1.5 in (38 mm) thick.

== Service history ==
Goito was built by the Regio Cantiere di Castellammare di Stabia shipyard; her keel was laid down in September 1885 and her completed hull was launched on 6 July 1887. She was completed on 16 February 1888 and commissioned into the fleet, the first member of her class to enter service. That year, she took part in the annual fleet maneuvers, along with five ironclads, a protected cruiser, the torpedo cruisers Tripoli, Saetta, and Folgore, and numerous smaller vessels. The maneuvers consisted of close-order drills and a simulated attack on and defense of La Spezia. Later that year, the ship was present during a naval review held for the German Kaiser Wilhelm II during a visit to Italy.

Goitoc. 1899

The ship served in the 3rd Division of the Active Squadron during the 1893 fleet maneuvers, along with the ironclads Affondatore and Enrico Dandolo and four torpedo boats. During the maneuvers, which lasted from 6 August to 5 September, the ships of the Active Squadron simulated a French attack on the Italian fleet. The following year, the ship took part in the annual fleet maneuvers in the 1st Division of the Active Squadron, along with the ironclad battleship Re Umberto and the protected cruiser Stromboli. That year, Goito had her coal-fired boilers replaced with oil-fired models, and her center engine and propeller shaft were removed. Her engines now produced 2,521 ihp (1,880 kW) for a top speed of 17.2 knots (31.9 km/h; 19.8 mph).

In 1895, Goito was stationed in the 2nd Maritime Department, split between Taranto and Naples, along with most of the torpedo cruisers in the Italian fleet. These included her sister ships Monzambano, Montebello, and Confienza, the eight Partenope-class cruisers, and Tripoli. Goito was converted into a minelayer in 1897. Her torpedo tubes were removed and equipment to handle sixty naval mines was installed. In 1898, Goito was assigned to the Reserve Squadron, which included the ironclads Lepanto, Francesco Morosini, and Ruggiero di Lauria, and three protected cruisers. The following year, she returned to the Active Squadron, where she served with six ironclads, the armored cruiser Vettor Pisani, the protected cruiser Lombardia, and Calatafimi. During the 1907 fleet maneuvers, Goito was attached to the main fleet to lay mines at a simulated advance base that would be created during the exercises.

At the outbreak of the Italo-Turkish War in September 1911, Goito was stationed in Venice along with Tripoli and Montebello. None of the vessels saw action during the war. Italy had declared neutrality at the start of World War I, but by July 1915, the Triple Entente had convinced the Italians to enter the war against the Central Powers. Admiral Paolo Thaon di Revel, the Italian naval chief of staff, believed that the threat from Austro-Hungarian submarines and naval mines in the narrow waters of the Adriatic was too serious for him to use the fleet in an active way. Instead, Revel decided to implement a blockade at the relatively safer southern end of the Adriatic with the main fleet, while smaller vessels, such as the MAS boats, conducted raids on Austro-Hungarian ships and installations. Goito was initially used to lay a series of defensive minefields, along with the torpedo cruisers Partenope and Minerva, in support of this strategy. The ship remained in service until early 1920; she was stricken from the naval register on 15 March 1920 and subsequently broken up for scrap.
