= Italian cruiser Pietro Micca =

Torpedo cruiser of the Italian Royal Navy

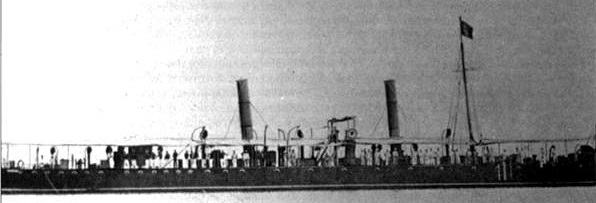
- Pietro Micca, date unknown

Class overview
- Preceded by: None
- Succeeded by: Tripoli

History

Kingdom of Italy
- Name: Pietro Micca
- Namesake: Pietro Micca
- Laid down: 15 February 1875
- Launched: 1 August 1875
- Completed: 3 July 1877
- Stricken: 7 November 1893
- Fate: Sold for scrap

General characteristics
- Type: Torpedo cruiser
- Displacement: Design: 526.5 long tons (534.9 t); Full load: 598 long tons (608 t)
- Length: 61.87 m (203 ft)
- Beam: 5.97 m (19 ft 7 in)
- Draft: 3.62 m (11 ft 11 in)
- Installed power: 4 × boilers; 571 indicated horsepower (426 kW)
- Propulsion: 1 × single-expansion steam engine; 1 × screw propeller
- Speed: 12.88 kn (23.85 km/h; 14.82 mph)
- Complement: 73
- Armament: 1, 2, or 6 × torpedo tubes; 1 or 2 × machine guns
- Armor: Deck: 0.8 in (20 mm) steel on 1.6 in (40 mm) wrought iron

Pietro Micca was the first torpedo cruiser built by the Italian Regia Marina, and one of the first vessels of the type to be built by any navy. She was laid down in February 1875, launched in August 1876, and completed in July 1877. Details of her armament are contradictory, with various sources reporting a range of torpedo weapons, including a single 16-inch (406 mm) torpedo tube, a pair of tubes of undetermined diameter, and as many as six tubes. She proved to be unable to reach the projected speed of 17 knots (31 km/h; 20 mph), and so she did not see much active service. She remained in the Regia Marina's inventory until 1893, but spent most of her 16-year life in the reserve.

== Design ==
Admiral Simone Antonio Saint-Bon, then the Italian Minister of the Navy, ordered a small, fast vessel that was armed with Whitehead torpedoes. Saint-Bon's request came in part due to budgetary problems that prevented building a large fleet of ironclad battleships. Engineering Inspector Felice Mattei prepared the design for the new ship, which became Pietro Micca, one of the first torpedo cruisers, along with the German Zieten. Mattei and the design staff intended to build a fast, light ship that could quickly strike at an enemy ironclad and then escape before the enemy's guns could be brought to bear. Design work was completed in 1873 and Saint-Bon presented the concept to the Chamber of Deputies on 6 December that year.

=== General characteristics and machinery ===
Pietro Micca was 61.87 meters (203 ft) long between perpendiculars and had a beam of 5.97 m (19 ft 7 in) and an average draft of 3.62 m (11 ft 11 in). She displaced 526.5 long tons (534.9 t) normally and 598 long tons (608 t) at full load. The ship had an iron-built hull with a flat bottom; above the waterline, she had a pronounced tumblehome shape with sharply curving sides. Much of the ship's internal space was reserved for propulsion system and coal storage, with only the forward quarter reserved for crew spaces and stores. Steering was controlled with a single rudder. The ship had a very minimalist superstructure, with a small conning tower and a single pole mast. She had a crew of 73 officers and men.

Her propulsion system consisted of one single-expansion steam engine that drove a single screw propeller. The engine was produced by Gio. Ansaldo & C. Steam was supplied by four coal-fired boilers, which were separated into two boiler rooms, and each room was ducted into its own funnel. Though she was designed to steam at 17 knots (31 km/h; 20 mph), with a maximum speed of 20 knots (37 km/h; 23 mph), her hull shape prevented her from reaching either speed. Pietro Micca could only steam at a top speed of 12.88 knots (23.85 km/h; 14.82 mph) from 571 indicated horsepower (426 kW).

=== Armament and armor ===
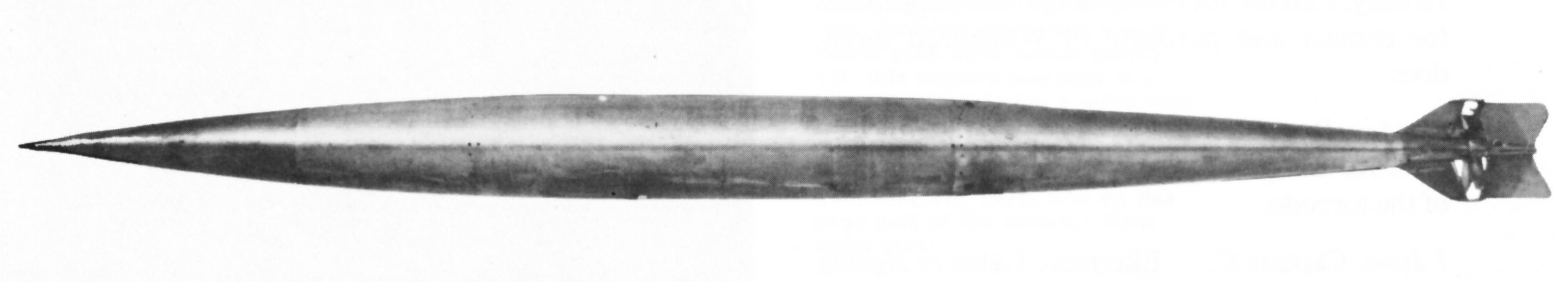
An early Whitehead torpedo similar to the type carried by Pietro Micca

The primary weapon for Pietro Micca was her torpedo armament, but details of it are contradictory. According to Conway's All The World's Fighting Ships, she was fitted with a single 16 in (406 mm) torpedo tube. The tube was mounted in the bow, above the waterline, and was supplied with ten Whitehead torpedoes. But the US Navy officer Ridgely Hunt, writing in 1891, describes the vessel as having been equipped with a pair of tubes submerged in her hull. Meanwhile, the Italian Navy describes the vessel as having had six torpedo tubes. The contemporary naval expert Edward Very seems to support the Navy's description, writing in 1881 that the ship was "provided with tubes for discharging Whitehead torpedoes ahead, abeam, and astern." She also carried a pair of machine guns, though again, the Italian Navy disagrees, stating that Pietro Micca had only one light gun.

The ship was protected with an armor deck that was 7 ft (2.1 m) wide on the flat, and then sloped down to the sides of the hull. It was placed 10 inches below the waterline. The flat portion of the deck consisted of one layer of steel that was 0.6 in (15 mm) thick, atop two layers of wrought iron that were 0.8 in (20 mm) thick each. The sloped sides decreased in thickness slightly, to layers of 0.4 in (10 mm) of steel and 0.8 in of iron.

== Service history ==
Pietro Micca was built by the Venetian Arsenal. Her keel was laid down on 15 February 1875, and her completed hull was launched on 1 August 1876. Fitting-out work was finished on 3 July 1877. Shortly after completing sea trials, during which the crew discovered that her hull shape prevented her from reaching her intended speed, Pietro Micca was placed in reserve. Since her low speed prevented her from catching the ironclad battleships she had been intended to destroy, she did not see much service with the Italian fleet. Instead, she was used primarily as a test ship to further develop the use of torpedoes by the fleet. By 1886, Pietro Micca had been disarmed of her torpedo weapons and carried just a pair of machine guns. By that time, she was credited by The Naval Annual with a top speed of only 7 knots (13 km/h; 8.1 mph).

The 1892 edition of The Naval Annual reported that Pietro Micca had had a single torpedo launcher installed, though she was only used for harbor service; by that time, she was reportedly capable of steaming at 8 knots (15 km/h; 9.2 mph). The following year, she was laid up in La Spezia, along with several other torpedo cruisers of the Goito and Partenope classes. According to Conway's All the World's Fighting Ships, the Italian Navy had informally removed Pietro Micca from the naval register "some years before" formally striking her in 1893. Pietro Micca was sold for scrap on 7 November that year and subsequently broken up.
