= Goito-class cruiser =

Torpedo cruiser class of the Italian Royal Navy

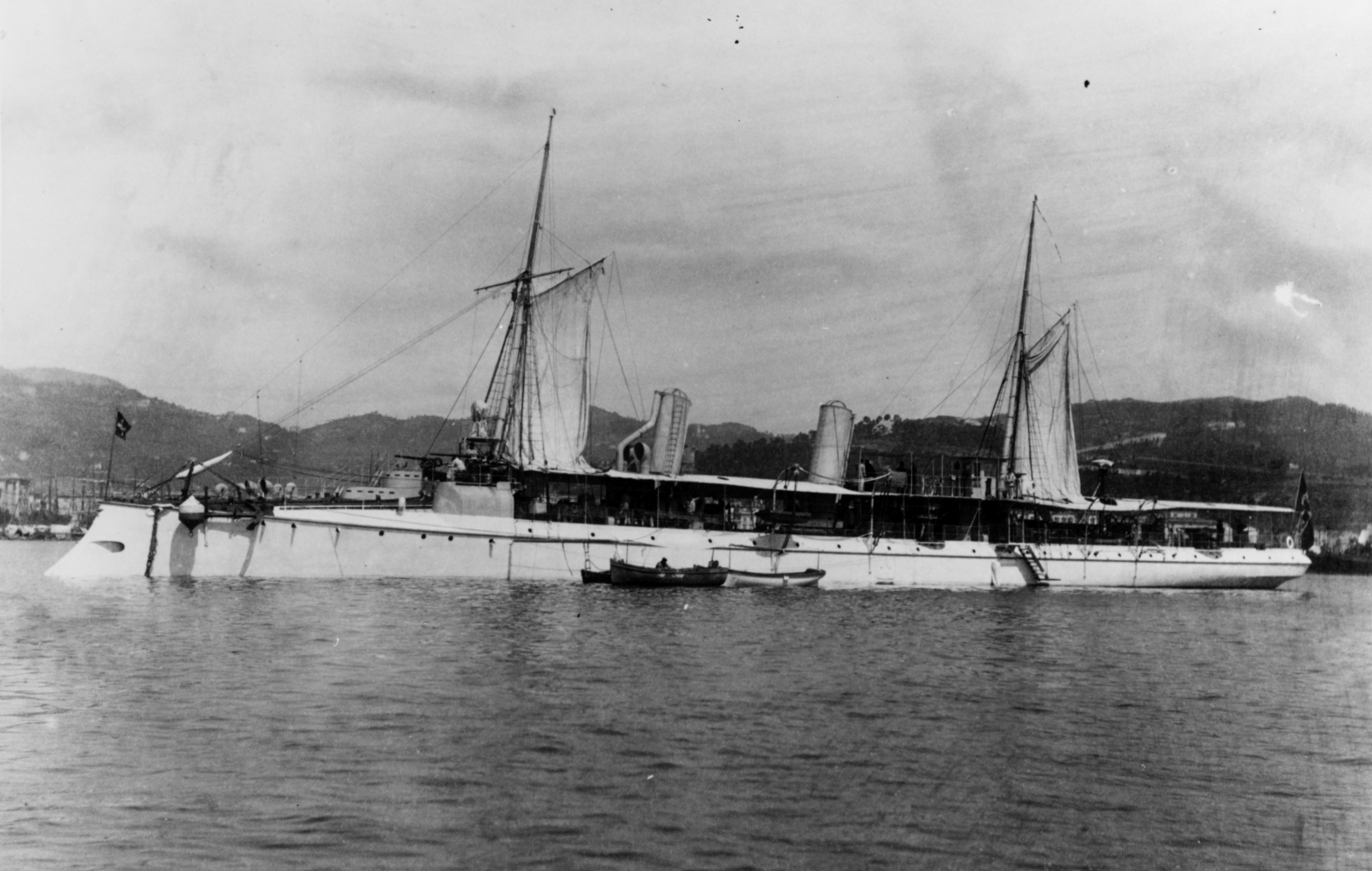
- Goito early in her career with canvas awnings erected

Class overview
- Operators: Kingdom of Italy
- Preceded by: Tripoli
- Succeeded by: Folgore class
- Built: 1885–1890
- In commission: 1888–1920
- Completed: 4
- Scrapped: 4

General characteristics for Goito (Note: Figures are for Goito; the other three vessels varied in armament and size)
- Type: Torpedo cruiser
- Displacement: Normal: 829 long tons (842 t); Full load: 974 long tons (990 t)
- Length: 73.4 m (240 ft 10 in)
- Beam: 7.88 m (25 ft 10 in)
- Draft: 3.6 m (11 ft 10 in)
- Installed power: 6 × locomotive boilers; 2,500 to 3,180 indicated horsepower (1,860 to 2,370 kW)
- Propulsion: 3 × double-expansion steam engines; 3 × screw propellers
- Speed: 18 kn (33 km/h; 21 mph)
- Range: 1,100 nautical miles (2,000 km; 1,300 mi) at 10 kn (19 km/h; 12 mph)
- Complement: 105–121
- Armament: 5 × 57 mm (2.24 in) guns; 2 × 37 mm (1.5 in) guns; 2 × 37 mm Hotchkiss guns; 5 × 14 in (356 mm) torpedo tubes
- Armor: Deck: 1.5 in (38 mm)

The Goito class was a group of four torpedo cruisers built for the Italian Regia Marina (Royal Navy) in the 1880s. The members of the class were Goito, Montebello, Monzambano, and Confienza. They were among the first torpedo cruisers built for the Italian fleet, and were built to improve on the previous vessel, Tripoli. Experimental ships, the four Goito-class vessels varied in their dimensions, machinery, and armament, though all were comparable in terms of capabilities, having a top speed of 17 to 18 knots (31 to 33 km/h; 20 to 21 mph) and carrying an armament of four or five 14-inch (360 mm) torpedo tubes.

All four ships spent the majority of their time in service with the main Italian fleet, alternating between active duty for training exercises and reserve status. In 1897, Goito was converted into a minelayer and Montebello became a training ship for engine room personnel. Monzambano and Confienza were simply sold for scrap in 1901. Goito laid defensive minefields after Italy entered World War I in 1915, but otherwise did not see action during the war. The two surviving vessels remained in the Italian fleet until 1920, when they too were broken up for scrap.

== Design ==
The first three members of the Goito class was designed by Engineering General Inspector Benedetto Brin, while Confienza was designed by Engineering Director Giacinto Pullino. Brin had previously designed several classes of very large ironclad battleships, including the Duilio and Italia classes, but by the 1880s, he had begun to embrace the ideas of the Jeune École, which emphasized small, fast, torpedo-armed vessels that could damage or destroy the much larger battleships at a fraction of the cost. The four Goitos were similar to the preceding cruiser Tripoli, the first torpedo cruiser Brin designed. As these were among the initial designs prepared by the Italian navy, they were experimental; Brin and Pullino used different hull shapes for all four vessels and fitted them with a variety of propulsion systems and armament.

=== General characteristics and machinery ===
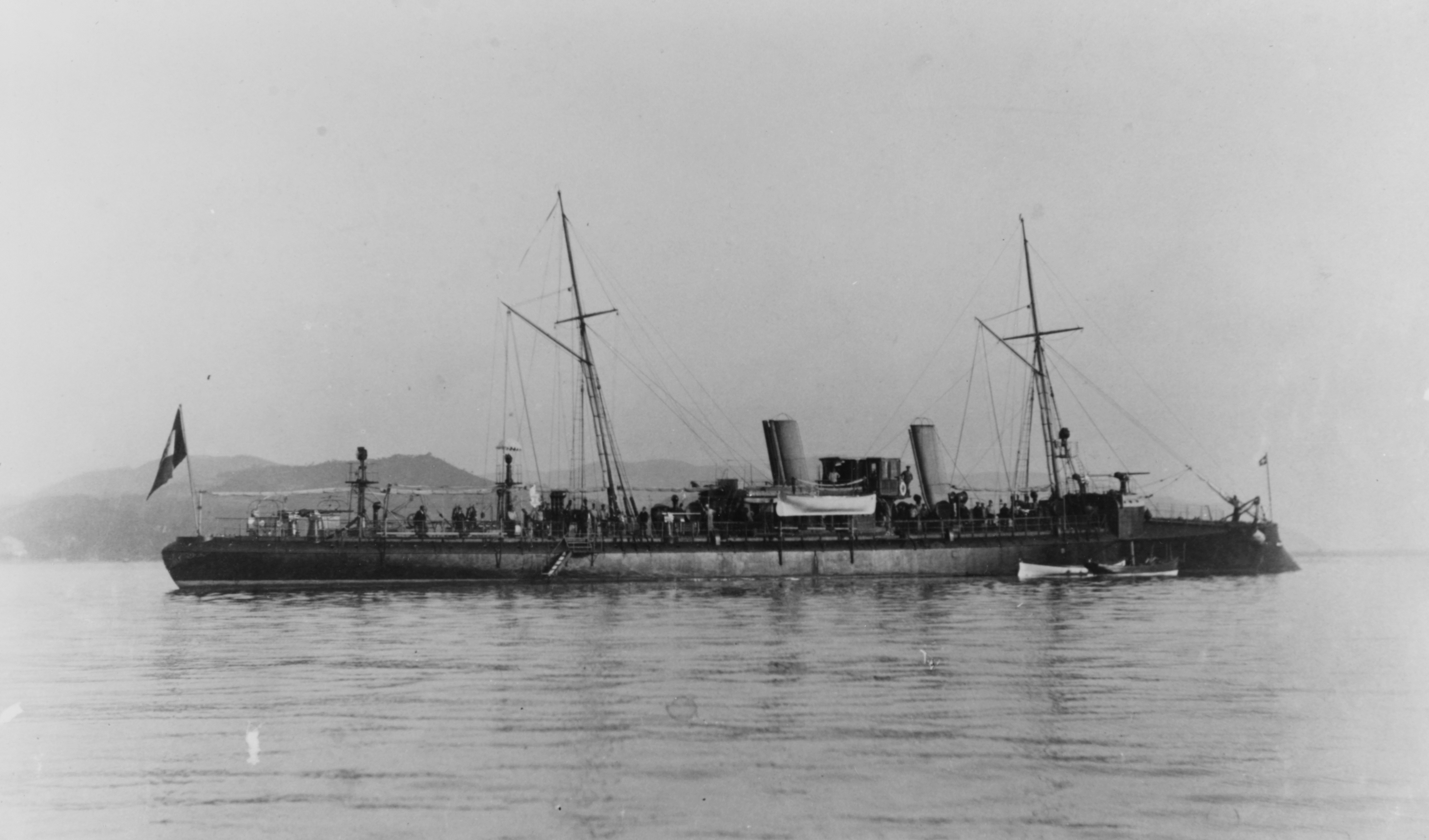
Monzambano shortly after entering service

As a result of their experimental nature, the ships of the Goito class varied slightly in size. They all were 70 meters (229 ft 8 in) long at the waterline and 73.4 m (240 ft 10 in) long overall, but their beam varied from 7.88 to 8.05 m (25 ft 10 in to 26 ft 5 in) and their draft ranged from 3.04 to 3.6 m (10 ft 0 in to 11 ft 10 in). The ships were built with steel hulls. They displaced 756 to 856 long tons (768 to 870 t) normally and 955 to 974 long tons (970 to 990 t) at full load. They had a crew of between 105 and 121.

The first three ships had similar propulsion systems that consisted of three steam engines, each driving a single screw propeller. Goito and Monzambano had double-expansion engines, while Montebello had more advanced triple-expansion engines. Confienza instead used a two-shaft configuration for her double-expansion engines. Steam for the engines was supplied by coal-fired locomotive boilers; Goito and Montebello had six boilers, while Monzambano and Confienza had four. The boilers for Goito and Monzambano were trunked into two funnels, Montebello had three, and Confienza only had one.

Exact figures for the first three ships' performance have not survived, but they could steam at a speed of about 18 knots (33 km/h; 21 mph) from 2,500 to 3,180 indicated horsepower (1,860 to 2,370 kW). Confienza, with only two screws, had a top speed of 17 knots (31 km/h; 20 mph) from 1,962 ihp (1,463 kW). In 1894, Goito had her center engine and screw removed and her original boilers replaced with oil-fired models. With these changes, her engines were capable of producing 17.2 knots (31.9 km/h; 19.8 mph) from 2,521 ihp (1,880 kW). The ships had a cruising radius of 1,100 nautical miles (2,000 km; 1,300 mi) at a speed of 10 knots (19 km/h; 12 mph). They were originally fitted with a fore-and-aft sailing rig to supplement the steam engines, though they were later removed.

=== Armament and armor ===
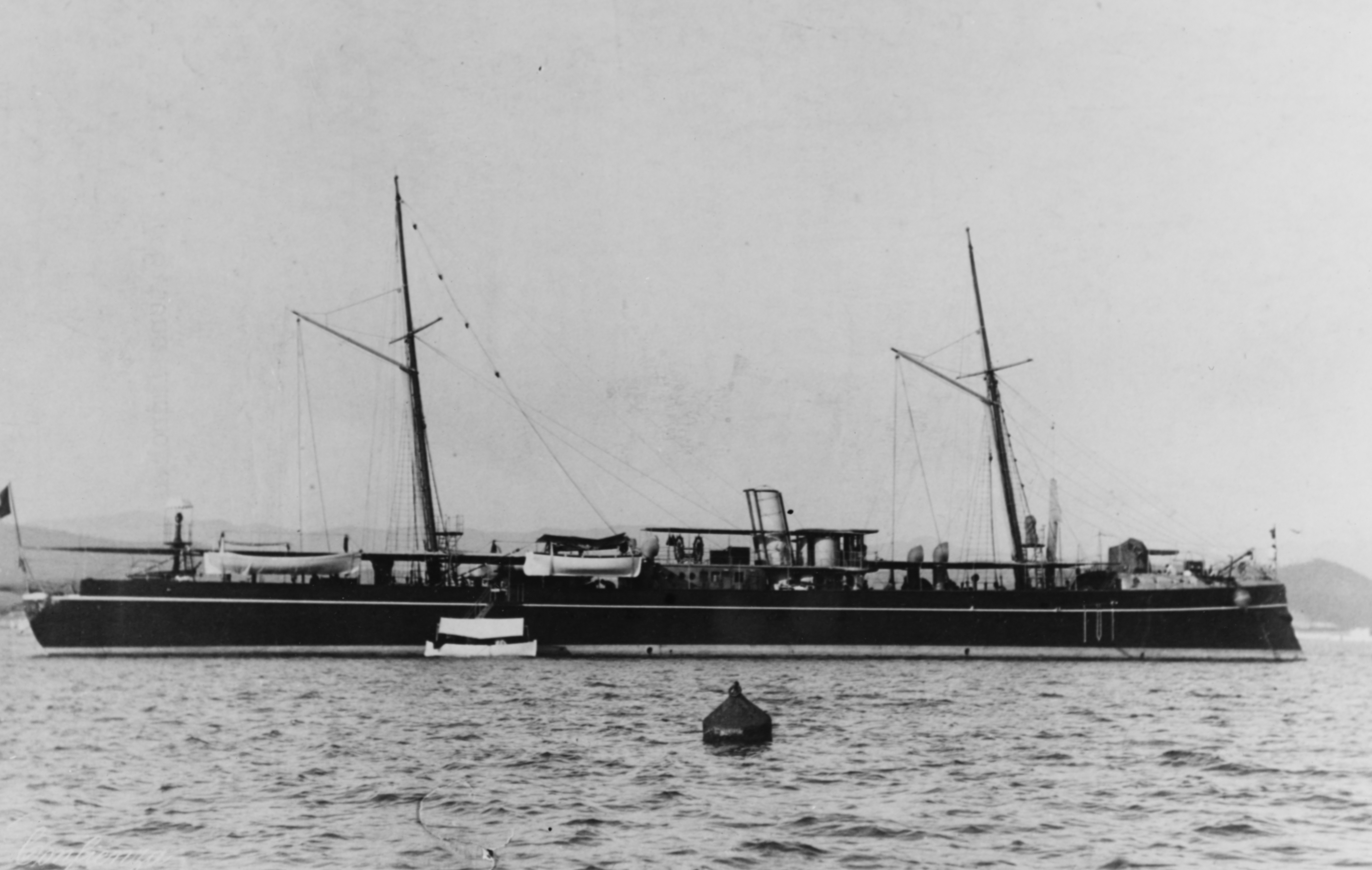
Confienza; note the 4.7 in gun on her bow

The primary armament for the Goito class was five 14 in (356 mm) torpedo tubes, though Montebello only had four tubes. The ships also carried a variety of light guns. Goito was equipped with five 57 mm (2.24 in) 40-caliber (cal.) guns, two 37 mm (1.5 in) 20-cal. guns, and three 37 mm revolving Hotchkiss guns, all mounted singly. Montebello had six 57 mm guns and two 37 mm guns, and Monzambano carried only six 57 mm guns. Confienza was the only vessel to carry a medium-caliber gun, a single 4.7 in (120 mm) 32-cal. gun mounted on her bow. She also carried six 57 mm guns and two 37 mm guns. The ships were protected with an armored deck that was 1.5 in (38 mm) thick.

== Ships ==
Construction data
Name	Builder	Laid down	Launched	Completed
Goito	Regio Cantiere di Castellammare di Stabia, Castellammare di Stabia	September 1885	6 July 1887	16 February 1888
Monzambano	Arsenale di La Spezia, La Spezia	25 August 1885	14 March 1888	11 August 1889
Montebello	Arsenale di La Spezia, La Spezia	25 September 1885	14 March 1888	21 January 1889
Confienza	Arsenale di La Spezia, La Spezia	September 1887	28 July 1889	11 April 1890

== Service history ==
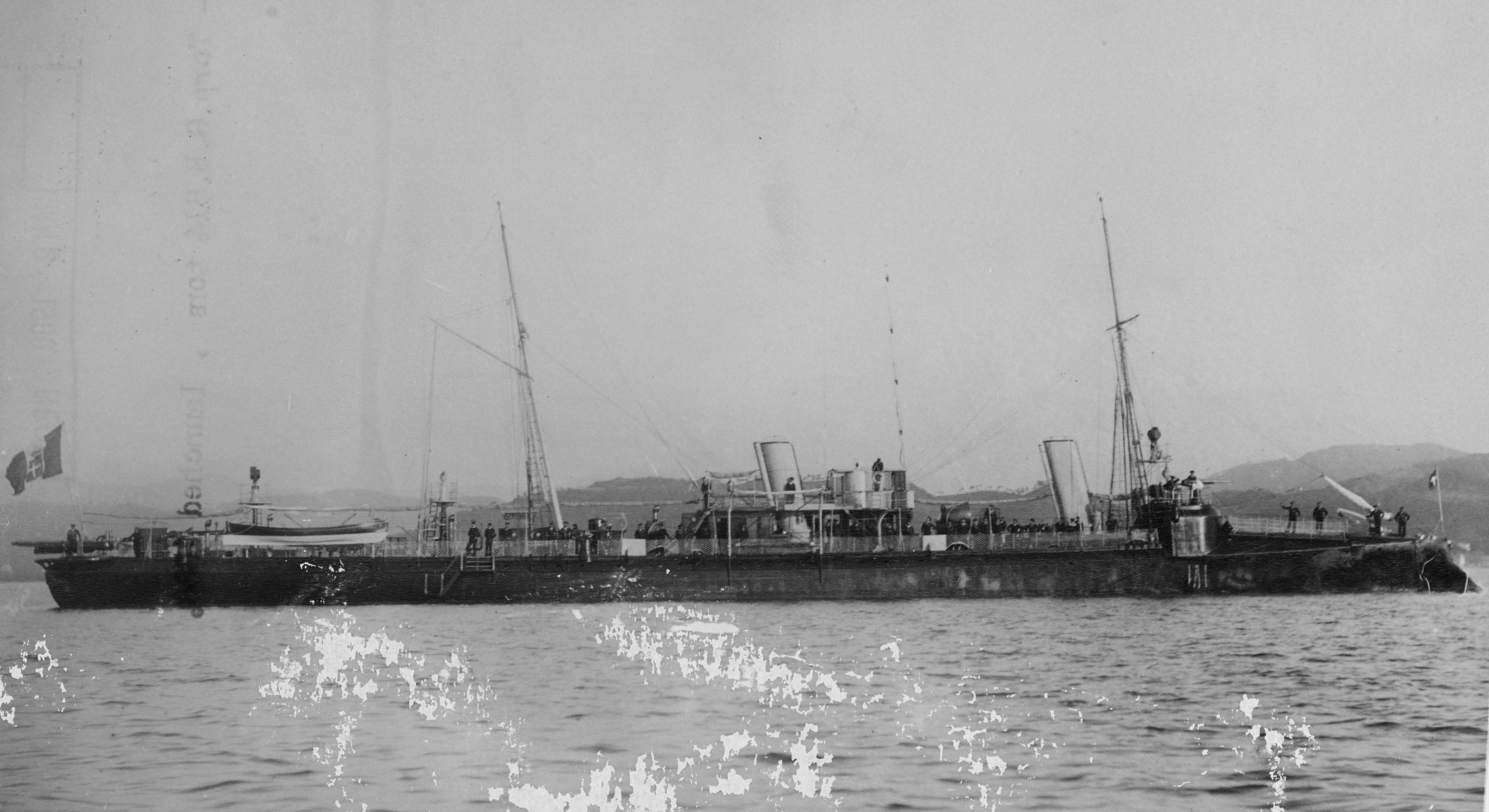
Montebello early in her career

All four Goito-class cruisers served with the main Italian fleet for the majority of their careers. This time was spent either laid up in the reserve component of the fleet, or activated for yearly training maneuvers. These frequently gamed a French attack on Italy, as in the case of the 1888 maneuvers—for which only Goito had been completed in time to participate—that simulated a French attack on La Spezia, or the 1893 maneuvers, which tested a French attack on Naples. In 1898, Monzambano and Montebello participated in a rare deployment for members of the class when they were assigned to the Levant Squadron that was tasked with patrolling the eastern Mediterranean Sea. Throughout this period, the ships of the class would either be distributed among the divisions of the fleet, as with the case of the annual training maneuvers, or stationed together while in reserve status; in 1895, for example, the four Goitos were assigned to the 2nd Maritime Department, along with Tripoli and the eight Partenope-class torpedo cruisers.

In 1897, Goito was withdrawn from front-line service and converted in a minelayer, with a capacity for 60 naval mines in place of her torpedo tubes. Montebello remained on active duty until 1898, when she was converted into a training ship for engine room personnel, and was re-boilered with coal- and oil-fired equipment from several manufacturers in 1903. Confienza and Monzambano were the last members of the class to leave active service, being stricken from the naval register on the same day, 26 August 1901 and sold for scrapping. Goito continued to take part in fleet maneuvers as late as 1907 in her minelayer configuration, and both she and Manzambano remained in the Regia Marina's inventory during the Italo-Turkish War of 1911–1912 and World War I. Neither ship saw action in either conflict, though Goito laid defensive minefields in the Adriatic Sea after Italy entered World War I in 1915. Montebello was eventually stricken on 26 January 1920, and Goito followed her to the breakers' yard on 15 March.
