= La Spezia Naval Base =

Naval base in La Spezia, Italy

- Arsenale Militare Marittimo di La Spezia
- La Spezia in Italy
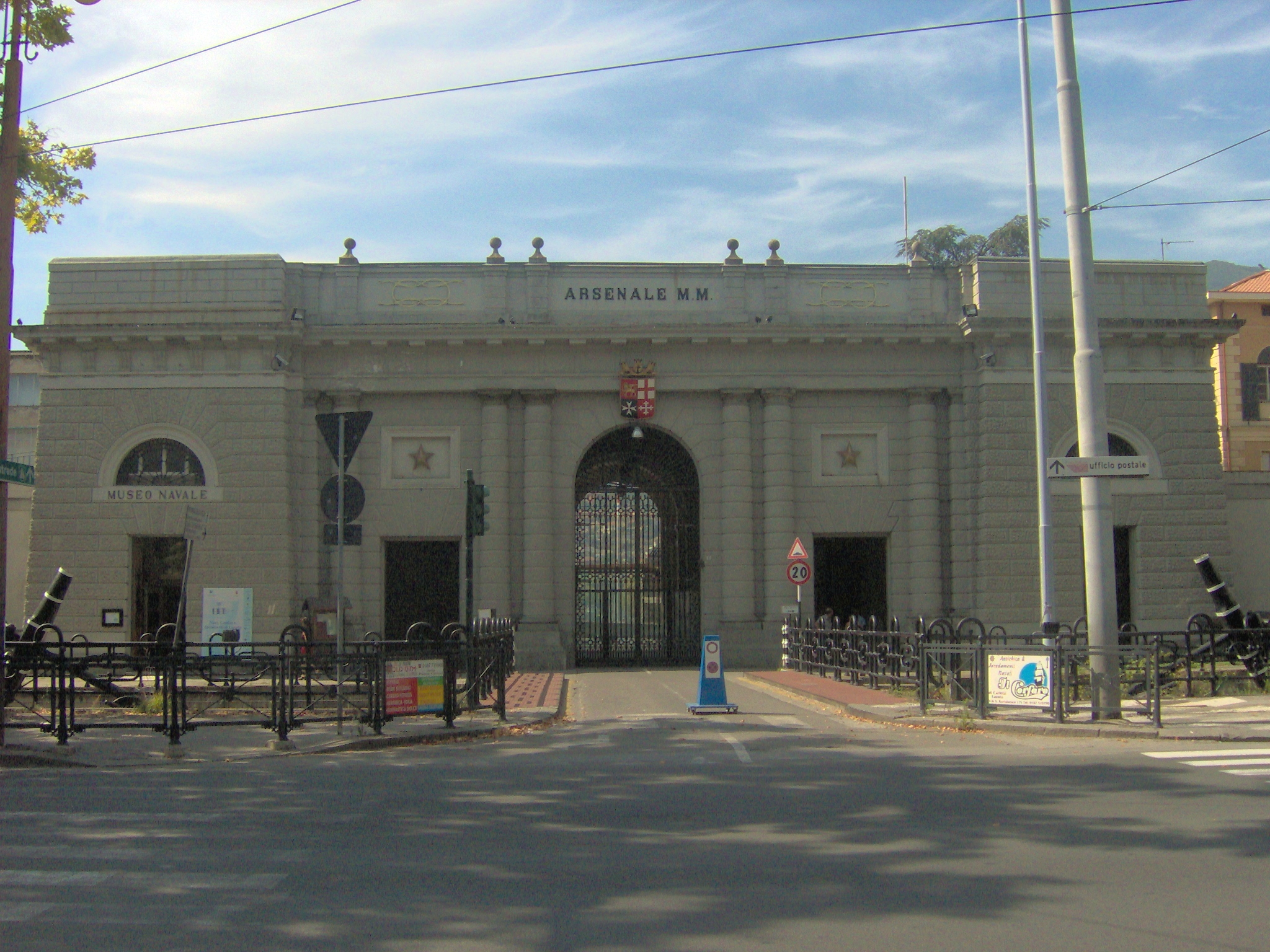
- Entrance to La Spezia Naval Base

Site information
- Type: Military base
- Owner: Italian Ministry of Defence
- Operator: Italian Navy

Location
- La Spezia Naval Base is located in Northern Italy on the Ligurian Sea
- Coordinates: 44°5′57″N 9°49′9″E

Site history
- Built: 1862
- Architect: Domenico Chiodo
- In use: 1869—Present
- Events: World War II

Garrison information
- Garrison: 1st Naval Division, Mine Dredging Force Command, Auxiliary Ships Command

La Spezia Naval Base is one of the Italian Navy's most important and historic bases. The base lies in the central-western zone of the Gulf of Spezia, close to the historic centre of La Spezia.

== History ==
=== Construction ===
It was Napoleon Bonaparte who first conceived the idea of building a great arsenal in the Gulf of Spezia.

Napoleon's idea was revived in 1857 by Camillo Benso, Count of Cavour, then Chairman of the Board and Secretary of the Navy, who arranged funding and entrusted Domenico Chiodo, an official of the Military Engineers, with the construction of the new naval base. Rendel produced plans which resulted in a large modern naval base being built from scratch.

Work began in 1862 and ended on August 28, 1869, when General Domenico Chiodo formally inaugurated the plant by flooding the newly built docks.

=== World War II ===
During the Second World War, because of its strategic importance, the base was heavily bombed and was almost completely destroyed, but was quickly renovated to full operation in the postwar period.

On April 6 1945, American forces in Italy captured La Spezia against fierce resistance. Later, a counter-attack led to its recapture.

The 2nd Squadron and Decima Flottiglia MAS, among others, were based here.

=== Present ===
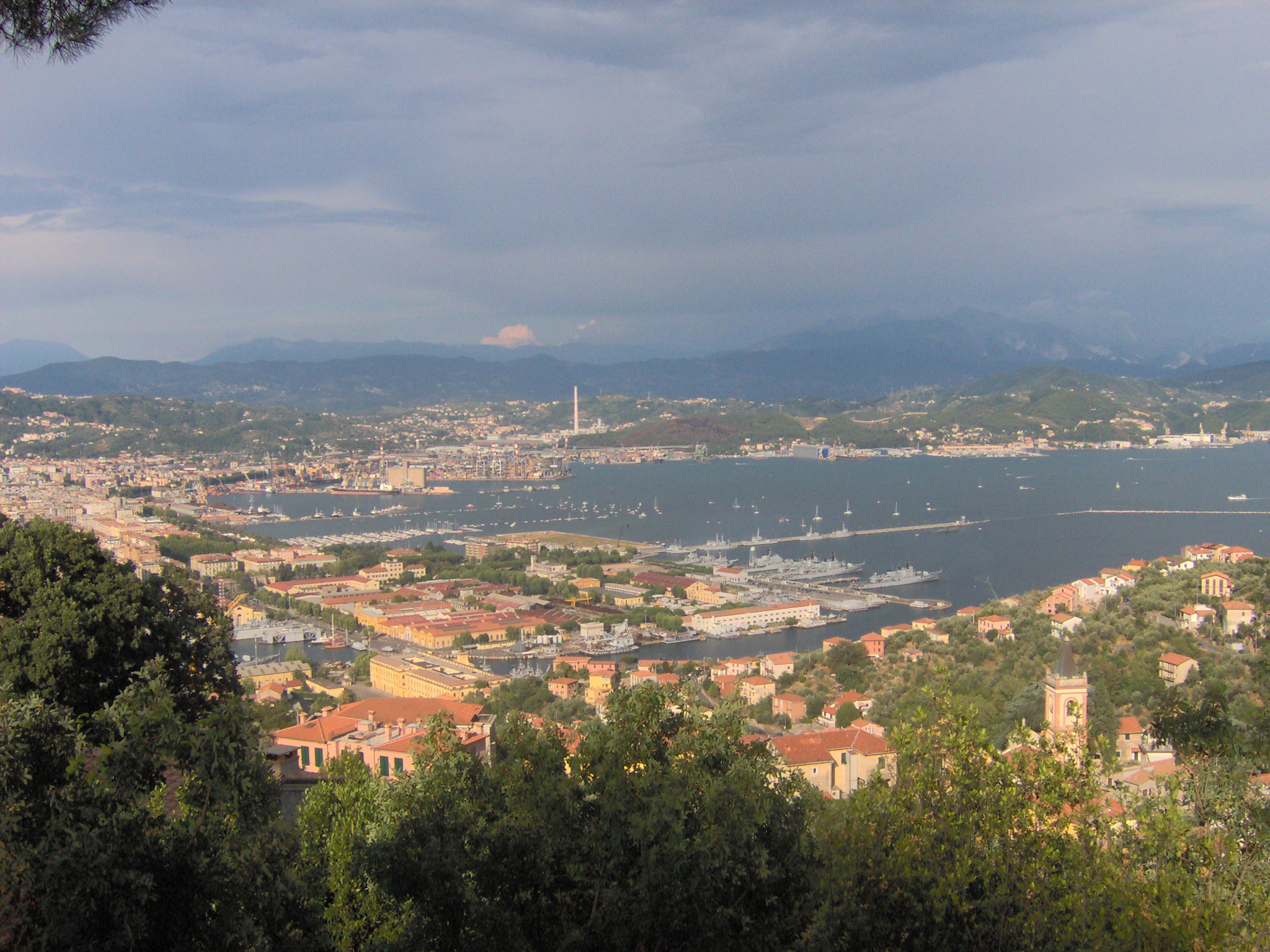
View of the Gulf of Spezia, looking over the Base

After the war and throughout the Cold War era, the base has been home to the 1st Naval Division. Currently it employs approximately 1,000 civilian employees and 200 military. It covers an area of nearly 85 hectares and within it there are about 13 kilometers of roads. The layout is still based on the original nineteenth-century design. The advent of aerial warfare has made the base almost redundant, as it is too exposed to air attack.

The fall of the Berlin Wall and the end of the Soviet threat changed Italy's defense needs, shifting the focus to the south, in the Mediterranean. This resulted in a significant decline in importance of La Spezia base in favor of those of Taranto and Augusta. The only complete units left in La Spezia are the Maestrale-class frigates of the 2nd squadron with the Vesuvio, the Lerici-class minehunters of the Mine Countermeasures Forces, and the Elettra multipurpose support unit.

Another problem with the base is the lack of privacy: the arsenal is easily visible from the houses next to the perimeter and the mountains of the western part of the Gulf, while modern technology has rendered the security measures obsolete. For these reasons, as well as the closure of the training center for recruits at the end of their compulsory military service, the activities and personnel there are currently being reduced, resulting in large areas of the base being disused.

=== Museum ===
Next to the main entrance of the base situated the Naval Technical Museum, typically open to the public. The museum, established with the aim of keeping seafaring traditions alive, includes more than 150 models of ships and boats, about 2500 medals, 6500 memorabilia, 2000 documents, and over 5000 technical and historical books. Unlike the Naval Museum of Venice, which is more focused on the general maritime history and the naval history of the Venetian Republic in particular, the focus of the Naval Museum of La Spezia is more technical. Its main specialty is the equipment of the Italian Navy special forces, which were founded in La Spezia and are still stationed there.

In 1860 and 1861, the naval forces of other Italian states were incorporated into the Marine of Savoy which therefore became the Italian Navy (Regia Marina). At the same time the Naval Museum in Genoa acquitted exhibits from the integrated navies. In the years under the direction of Domenico Chiodo the new naval port of La Spezia was founded, and in 1870 all the departments of the Navy based in Genoa, including the Marine Museum moved to La Spezia. The Museum received its present name Museo Tecnico Navale in 1923, at the same time as the Naval History Museum in Venice was reestablished. During World War II La Spezia was attacked by the Allies repeatedly from the air. The naval base, the Arsenal and the Naval Museum suffered heavy destruction. A new building to house the remaining or restored exhibits was opened on 12 May 1958.

== Relationship with the city ==
=== Environmental problems ===
In 2004 an investigation began into the presence of an illegal dump of toxic substances (including asbestos insulation, and batteries containing lead, cadmium and depleted uranium) in the campo in ferro area of the base, close to the sea and some houses. Since it is a military area, only government officials have the right of access and inspection. There is a danger of the dispersal of asbestos dust, which is very light and volatile. Part of the waste in the landfill has been removed. Currently the area is covered with plastic sheeting. It is likely that the waste is below sea level.

In the depths of the nearby Lagora canal, according to some analyses by l'Arpal, are deposits of hydrocarbons, zinc, mercury and heavy metals.

There are also risks linked to the transit and docking of nuclear submarines in the past. The emergency plan in case of an accident has never been communicated to the civil authorities and the population. In at least one case, the local press has drawn attention to a possible accident to a US submarine moored at the diga foranea breakwater, but no official confirmation has been given.

=== Socio-economic problems ===
The base occupies the area of future expansion of the city, forcing it to develop to the east, a reclamation area. The main damage caused by the arrival of the arsenal was suffered by the lands of the west of the Gulf of La Spezia:

- Fabiano found itself without access to the sea and without the monastery of St. Francis the Great: currently the former monastic buildings are home to the police command and the adjacent church is surrounded by a scrapheap.
- At Marola the adjacent village of San Vito was destroyed, the church was demolished and rebuilt elsewhere at the expense of the inhabitants, the cemetery was rebuilt in Acquasanta, and the village was deprived of access to the sea. Currently, the dock area of the village is not used militarily, but is overrun with scrap, unusable vehicles, dilapidated sheds, and unused vessels belonging to the police and other bodies. These include lifeboats containing asbestos pipe insulation (Carabiniere, Alpino, Ardito, Audace etc.) The walk, which connected the town to the Spezia, was demolished, disconnecting it from the city.
- Cadimare is left with severely limited access to the sea.

The changes have broken the social and historical context of the places and events associated with them. These physical constraints have delayed, or in some cases prevented, the economic development of the villages of which the sea is a natural continuation: especially today with the move to tourism, such impediments to city activities are strongly resented.

Finally, during the works, Roman and early medieval ruins that were discovered were almost totally destroyed. Currently the Roman past of the area is virtually unknown to the public.
