= Italian ship Saetta =

Saetta ("arrow" or "lightning") was the name of at least three ships of the Italian Navy and may refer to:

- Italian cruiser Saetta, a Folgore-class cruiser launched in 1887 and broken up in 1908.
- Italian destroyer Saetta, a Freccia-class destroyer launched in 1932 and sunk in 1943.
- Italian patrol boat Saetta (P 494), a patrol boat launched in 1965 and retired in 1986.
