= Italian ship Folgore =

Folgore was the name of at least three ships of the Italian Navy and may refer to:

- Italian cruiser Folgore, a Folgore-class cruiser launched in 1886 and broken up in 1900.
- Italian destroyer Folgore, a Folgore-class destroyer launched in 1931 and sunk in 1942.
- Italian patrol boat Folgore (P 490), a patrol boat launched in 1954 and retired in 1976.
