= Italian cruiser Ettore Fieramosca =

Protected cruiser of the Italian Royal Navy

- Ettore Fieramosca, possibly at Algiers

History

Italy
- Name: Ettore Fieramosca
- Namesake: Ettore Fieramosca
- Builder: Cantiere navale fratelli Orlando, Livorno
- Laid down: 31 December 1885
- Launched: 30 August 1888
- Commissioned: 16 November 1889
- Stricken: 15 July 1909
- Fate: Sold for scrap, 1909

General characteristics
- Class & type: Etna-class cruiser
- Displacement: 3,538 long tons (3,595 t)
- Length: 290 ft (88.4 m)
- Beam: 43 ft 4 in (13.2 m)
- Draft: 18 ft 9 in (5.7 m)
- Installed power: 7,000 ihp (5,200 kW); 4 × fire-tube boilers
- Propulsion: 2 × compound steam engines; 2 × screw propellers
- Speed: 18 knots (33 km/h; 21 mph)
- Range: 5,000 nautical miles (9,300 km; 5,800 mi) at 10 knots (19 km/h; 12 mph)
- Complement: 17 officers and 298 men
- Armament: 2 × 254 mm (10 in) guns; 6 × 152 mm (6 in) guns; 6 × 57 mm (2.24 in) Hotchkiss guns; 8 × 37 mm (1.5 in) Hotchkiss guns; 3 × 356 mm (14 in) torpedo tubes
- Armor: Deck: 38 mm (1.5 in); Conning tower: 13 mm (0.5 in)

Ettore Fieramosca was a protected cruiser of the Italian Regia Marina (Royal Navy) built in the 1880s. She was the fourth and final member of the Etna class, which included three sister ships of slightly smaller dimensions. Named for the condottiero of the same name, she was the only member of her class not named for a volcano. The ship was laid down in December 1885, launched in August 1888, and was commissioned in November 1889. She was armed with a main battery of two 254 mm (10 in) and a secondary battery of six 152 mm (6 in) guns, and could steam at a speed of around 17 knots (31 km/h; 20 mph).

Ettore Fieramosca had a relatively uneventful career; her first decade in service was confined to the normal peacetime routine of training with the Italian fleet. She thereafter spent most of her career abroad, including a deployment to China to help suppress the Boxer Uprising in 1900 and tours in African and North American waters in the mid-1900s. She was stricken from the naval register in July 1909 and sold for scrap.

== Design ==
The four ships of the Etna class were designed in Italy as domestically produced versions of the British-built cruiser Giovanni Bausan. The Italian government secured a manufacturing license from the British firm Armstrong Whitworth, but the design was revised by the Italian naval engineer Carlo Vigna. These cruisers were intended to serve as "battleship destroyers", and represented a temporary embrace of the Jeune École doctrine by the Italian naval command.

Compared to her half-sisters, Ettore Fieramosca was almost 7 feet (2.1 m) longer at 290 feet (88.4 m) between perpendiculars, and 10 inches (0.3 m) wider with a beam of 43 feet 4 inches (13.2 m). She had a mean draft of 18 feet 9 inches (5.7 m) and displaced 3,538 long tons (3,595 t). Her crew numbered 17 officers and 298 men. Designed to be a half-knot faster than her sisters, the ship had two horizontal compound steam engines, each driving a single propeller, with steam provided by four double-ended cylindrical boilers. Ettore Fieramosca was the fastest ship in her class and reached a maximum speed of 18 knots (33 km/h; 21 mph) from 7,000 ihp (5,200 kW) during her sea trials. She had a cruising radius of 5,000 nautical miles (9,300 km; 5,800 mi) at a speed of 10 knots (19 km/h; 12 mph).

The main armament of the ships consisted of two Armstrong 254 mm (10 in), 30-caliber breech-loading guns mounted in barbettes fore and aft. She was also equipped with a secondary battery of six 152 mm (6 in), 40-caliber, breech-loading guns that were carried in sponsons along the sides of the ship. For anti-torpedo boat defense, Ettore Fieramosca was fitted with six 57 mm (2.24 in) 6-pounder Hotchkiss guns and eight 37 mm (1.5 in) 1-pounder Hotchkiss guns. The ship was also armed with three 356 mm (14 in) torpedo tubes. She was protected with an armor deck below the waterline with a maximum thickness of 38 mm (1.5 in). The conning tower had 13 mm (0.5 in) worth of armor plating.

== Service history ==
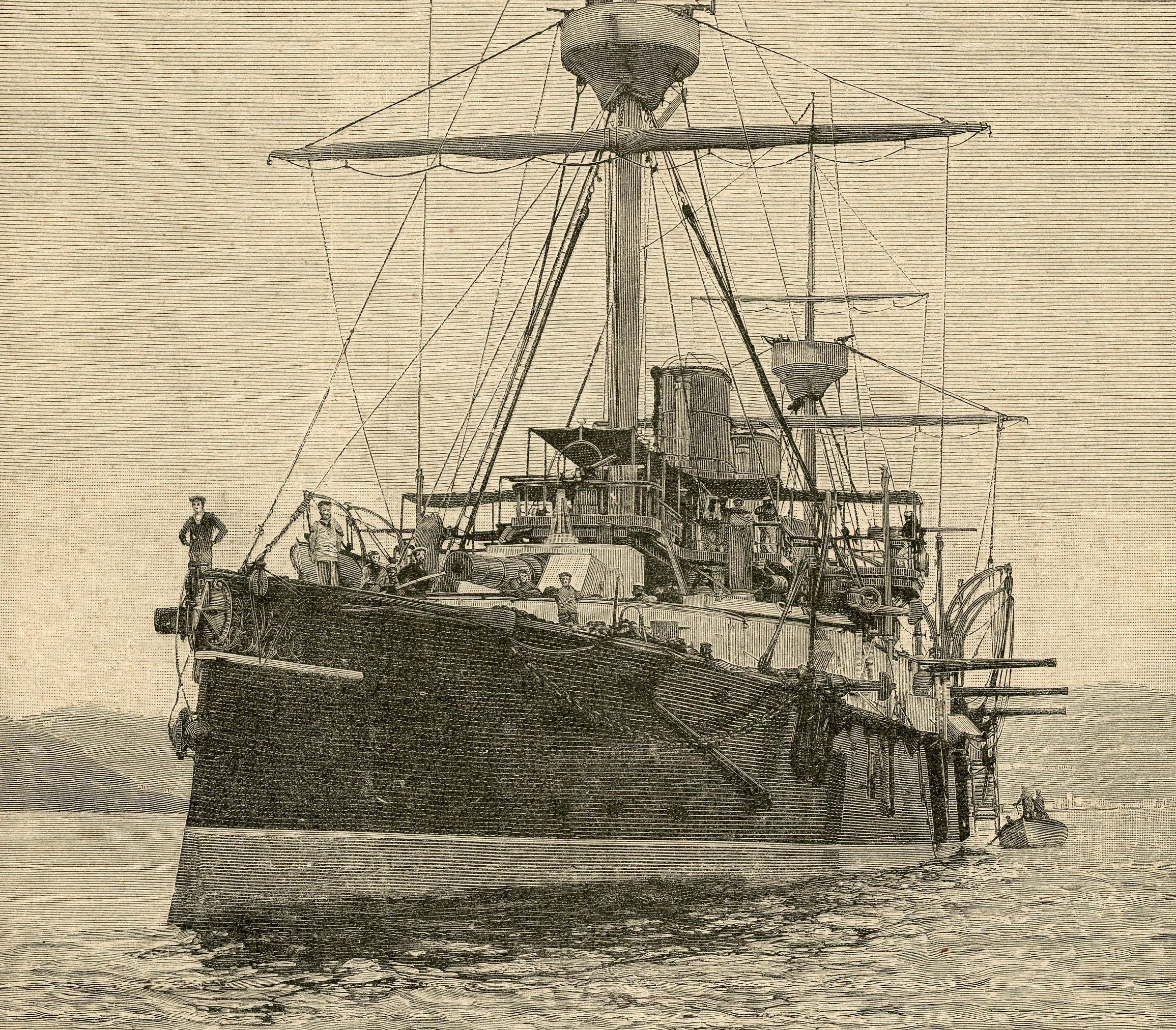
Sketch of the ship from 1892

Ettore Fieramosca was built by the Cantiere navale fratelli Orlando shipyard in Livorno. Her keel was laid down on 31 December 1885 and her completed hull was launched on 30 August 1888. After fitting-out work was finished, she was commissioned into the Italian fleet on 16 November 1889.

Ettore Fieramosca and her sisters Vesuvio and Stromboli participated in the 1893 naval maneuvers as part of the Squadron of Maneuvers. She was assigned to the 3rd Division, along with Vesuvio and the torpedo cruiser Aretusa and four torpedo boats. During the maneuvers, which lasted from 6 August to 5 September, the ships of the Reserve Squadron defended against a simulated attack by the Active Squadron, which gamed a French attack on the Italian fleet. On 1 October, she was assigned to the 3rd Department, which was stationed in Venice; she remained there through the following year. Stomboli and Ettore Fieramosca next participated in the 1896 naval maneuvers as part of the Maneuver Fleet. In 1897, Enrico Toti served aboard the ship.

Ettore Fieramosca and Vesuvio were sent to China in 1900 to assist the Eight-Nation Alliance in putting down the Boxer Uprising there. Ettore Fieramosca returned to Italy and made a cruise off East Africa in 1905. She then sailed across the Atlantic and made a number of port visits in South America. The ship was then assigned to the American Squadron and refitted in Boston in November 1906. During the cruiser in North American waters, Rear Admiral Roberto Cali was aboard the ship. Later that month, she visited Philadelphia, where several of her officers, including Cali, attended a celebration for Admiral George Dewey of the US Navy on 30 November. In 1908 she visited Bridgeport, Connecticut in the United States for celebrations on Columbus Day. There, bluejackets from Ettore Fieramosca and the US pre-dreadnought battleship USS New Hampshire marched in a parade. Upon her return to Italy in 1909 Ettore Fieramosca was struck off the naval register on 15 July 1909 and sold for scrap.
