= Italian cruiser Vesuvio =

Protected cruiser of the Italian Royal Navy

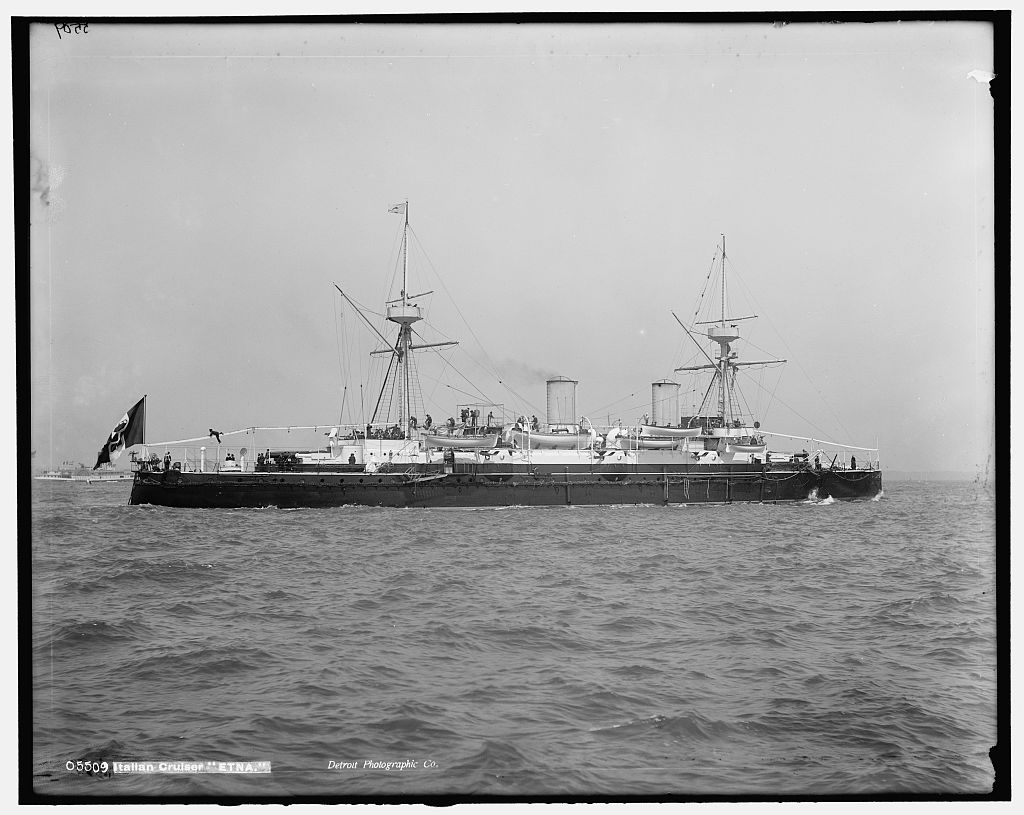
- Vesuvio's sister ship Etna in the 1890s

History

Italy
- Name: Vesuvio
- Namesake: Mount Vesuvius
- Builder: Cantiere navale fratelli Orlando, Livorno
- Laid down: 10 July 1883
- Launched: 21 March 1886
- Commissioned: 16 March 1888
- Stricken: 11 May 1911
- Fate: Sold for scrap, 1915

General characteristics
- Class & type: Etna-class cruiser
- Displacement: 3,373 long tons (3,427 t)
- Length: 283 ft 6 in (86.4 m)
- Beam: 42 ft 6 in (13 m)
- Draft: 19 ft (5.8 m)
- Installed power: 6,820 ihp (5,090 kW); 4 × fire-tube boilers
- Propulsion: 2 × compound steam engines; 2 × screw propellers
- Speed: 17 knots (31 km/h; 20 mph)
- Range: 5,000 nmi (9,300 km; 5,800 mi) at 10 knots (19 km/h; 12 mph)
- Complement: 12 officers and 296 men
- Armament: 2 × 254 mm (10 in) guns; 6 × 152 mm (6 in) guns; 5 × 57 mm (2.24 in) Hotchkiss guns; 5 × 37 mm (1.5 in) Hotchkiss guns; 4 × 356 mm (14 in) torpedo tubes
- Armor: Deck: 38 mm (1.5 in); Conning tower: 13 mm (0.5 in)

Vesuvio was a protected cruiser of the Italian Regia Marina (Royal Navy) built in the 1880s. She was the third member of the Etna class, which included three sister ships. Named for the volcano Mount Vesuvius, the ship's keel was laid down in July 1883. She was launched in March 1886 and was commissioned into the fleet in March 1888. She was armed with a main battery of two 254 mm (10 in) and a secondary battery of six 152 mm (6 in) guns, and could steam at a speed of around 17 knots (31 km/h; 20 mph). Her career was relatively uneventful; the only significant action in which she took part was the campaign against the Boxer Uprising in China in 1900. She was stricken from the naval register in May 1911 and sold for scrap in 1915.

== Design ==
The four ships of the Etna class were designed in Italy as domestically produced versions of the British-built cruiser Giovanni Bausan. The Italian government secured a manufacturing license from the British firm Armstrong Whitworth, but the design was revised by the Italian naval engineer Carlo Vigna. These cruisers were intended to serve as "battleship destroyers", and represented a temporary embrace of the Jeune École doctrine by the Italian naval command.

Vesuvio was 283 feet 6 inches (86.4 m) between perpendiculars, with a beam of 42 feet 6 inches (13 m). She had a mean draft of 19 feet (5.8 m) and displaced 3,373 long tons (3,427 t). Her crew numbered 12 officers and 296 men. The ship had two horizontal compound steam engines, each driving a single propeller, with steam provided by four double-ended cylindrical boilers. Vesuvio was credited with a top speed of 17 knots (31 km/h; 20 mph) from 6,820 indicated horsepower (5,090 kW). She had a cruising radius of 5,000 nautical miles (9,300 km; 5,800 mi) at a speed of 10 knots (19 km/h; 12 mph).

The main armament of the ships consisted of two Armstrong 254 mm (10 in), 30-caliber breech-loading guns mounted in barbettes fore and aft. She was also equipped with a secondary battery of six 152 mm (6 in), 32-caliber, breech-loading guns that were carried in sponsons along the sides of the ship. For anti-torpedo boat defense, Vesuvio was fitted with five 57 mm (2.24 in) 6-pounder Hotchkiss guns and five 37 mm (1.5 in) 1-pounder Hotchkiss guns. The ship was also armed with four 356 mm (14 in) torpedo tubes. One was mounted in the bow underwater and the other three were above water. She was protected with an armor deck below the waterline with a maximum thickness of 38 mm (1.5 in). The conning tower had 13 mm (0.5 in) worth of armor plating.

== Service history ==
Vesuvio was built by the Cantiere navale fratelli Orlando shipyard in Livorno, with her keel being laid down on 10 July 1883. Her completed hull was launched on 21 March 1886, and after fitting-out work was finished, she was commissioned into the Italian fleet on 16 March 1888. She was present during a naval review held for the German Kaiser Wilhelm II during a visit to Italy later that year. Vesuvio and her sisters Stromboli and Ettore Fieramosca participated in the 1893 naval maneuvers as part of the Squadron of Maneuvers, which was tasked with defending against the Permanent Squadron. Vesuvio was placed in reserve for 1896, though she was reactivated to take part on the naval maneuvers at the end of the year. During these maneuvers, she was assigned to a force tasked with defending against a simulated French fleet.

In February 1897, Vesuvio deployed to Crete to serve in the International Squadron, a multinational force made up of ships of the Austro-Hungarian Navy, French Navy, Imperial German Navy, Regia Marina, Imperial Russian Navy, and British Royal Navy that intervened in the 1897–1898 Greek uprising on Crete against rule by the Ottoman Empire. She arrived as part of an Italian division that also included the ironclad battleships Sicilia (flagship of the division's commander, Vice Admiral Felice Napoleone Canevaro) and Re Umberto and the torpedo cruiser Euridice. By June, she had been assigned to the 1st Division of the active fleet in 1897, which also included the battleships Re Umberto, Sardegna, and Sicilia, the protected cruiser Giovanni Bausan, and the torpedo cruisers Euridice and Montebello.

In 1900, Vesuvio and Ettore Fieramosca were sent to Chinese waters to assist in the suppression of the Boxer Uprising as part of the Eight-Nation Alliance. Both ships were formally assigned to the Cruising Squadron in Chinese waters in 1901. During 1901, she made stops in Shanghai, Wusong, and Hong Kong. After a second deployment to the Far East from 1906 to 1909, Vesuvio was placed in reserve, struck from the Navy List on 11 May 1911 and sold for scrap in 1915.
