= Italian cruiser Stromboli =

Protected cruiser of the Italian Royal Navy

- Stromboli, probably in 1896

History

Italy
- Name: Stromboli
- Namesake: Stromboli
- Builder: Venetian Arsenal
- Laid down: 27 September 1883
- Launched: 4 February 1886
- Commissioned: 21 March 1888
- Fate: Sold for scrap, 1911

General characteristics
- Class & type: Etna-class cruiser
- Displacement: 3,474 long tons (3,530 t)
- Length: 283 ft 6 in (86.4 m)
- Beam: 42 ft 6 in (13 m)
- Draft: 19 ft (5.8 m)
- Installed power: 6,252 ihp (4,662 kW); 4 × fire-tube boilers
- Propulsion: 2 × compound steam engines; 2 × screw propellers
- Speed: 17 knots (31 km/h; 20 mph)
- Range: 5,000 nautical miles (9,300 km; 5,800 mi) at 10 knots (19 km/h; 12 mph)
- Complement: 12 officers and 296 men
- Armament: 2 × 254 mm (10 in) guns; 6 × 152 mm (6 in) guns; 5 × 57 mm (2.24 in) Hotchkiss guns; 5 × 37 mm (1.5 in) Hotchkiss guns; 4 × 356 mm (14 in) torpedo tubes
- Armor: Deck: 38 mm (1.5 in); Conning tower: 13 mm (0.5 in)

Stromboli was a protected cruiser of the Italian Regia Marina (Royal Navy) built in the 1880s. She was the second member of the Etna class, which included three sister ships. She was named for the volcanic island of Stromboli, and was armed with a main battery of two 254 mm (10 in) and a secondary battery of six 152 mm (6 in) guns, and could steam at a speed of around 17 knots (31 km/h; 20 mph). Her career was relatively uneventful; the only significant action in which she took part was the campaign against the Boxer Uprising in China in 1900. She returned to Italy in 1901 and spent the rest of her career in reserve or as an ammunition ship, apart from a brief stint in active service in 1904. Stromboli was stricken from the naval register in 1907 and sold for scrapping in 1911.

== Design ==
The four ships of the Etna class were designed in Italy as domestically produced versions of the British-built cruiser Giovanni Bausan. The Italian government secured a manufacturing license from the British firm Armstrong Whitworth, but the design was revised by the Italian naval engineer Carlo Vigna. These cruisers were intended to serve as "battleship destroyers", and represented a temporary embrace of the Jeune École doctrine by the Italian naval command.

Stromboli was 283 feet 6 inches (86.4 m) between perpendiculars, with a beam of 42 feet 6 inches (13 m). She had a mean draft of 19 feet (5.8 m) and displaced between 3,373–3,474 long tons (3,427–3,530 t). Her crew numbered 12 officers and 296 men. The ship had two horizontal compound steam engines, each driving a single propeller, with steam provided by four double-ended cylindrical boilers. Stromboli was credited with a top speed of 17 knots (31 km/h; 20 mph) from 6,252 indicated horsepower (4,662 kW). She had a cruising radius of 5,000 nautical miles (9,300 km; 5,800 mi) at a speed of 10 knots (19 km/h; 12 mph).

The main armament of the ships consisted of two Armstrong 254 mm (10 in), 30-caliber breech-loading guns mounted in barbettes fore and aft. She was also equipped with a secondary battery of six 152 mm (6 in), 32-caliber, breech-loading guns that were carried in sponsons along the sides of the ship. For anti-torpedo boat defense, Stromboli was fitted with five 57 mm (2.24 in) 6-pounder Hotchkiss guns and five 37 mm (1.5 in) 1-pounder Hotchkiss guns. The ship was also armed with four 356 mm (14 in) torpedo tubes. One was mounted in the bow underwater and the other three were above water. She was protected with an armor deck below the waterline with a maximum thickness of 38 mm (1.5 in). The conning tower had 13 mm (0.5 in) worth of armor plating.

== Service history ==
Stromboli was laid down at the Venetian Arsenal in Venice on 27 September 1883 and her finished hull was launched on 4 February 1886. Following the completion of fitting-out work, she was commissioned into the Italian fleet on 21 March 1888. She was present during a naval review held for the German Kaiser Wilhelm II during a visit to Italy later that year. Stromboli and her sisters Vesuvio and Ettore Fieramosca participated in the 1893 naval maneuvers as part of the Active Squadron. On 1 October 1893, she was assigned to the 3rd Department, which was stationed in Venice; she remained there through the following year. Later in 1894, the ship took part in the annual fleet maneuvers in the 1st Division of the Active Squadron, along with the ironclad battleship Re Umberto and the torpedo cruiser Goito. Beginning on 14 October, the Italian fleet, including Stromboli, assembled in Genoa for a naval review held in honor of King Umberto I at the commissioning of the new ironclad Re Umberto. The festivities lasted three days.

Stromboli joined the ironclads Re Umberto, Sardegna, Ruggiero di Lauria, and Andrea Doria and the cruisers Etruria, Aretusa, and Partenope for a visit to Spithead in the United Kingdom in July 1895. Stomboli and Ettore Fieramosca next participated in the 1896 naval maneuvers as part of the Active Squadron. During this period, she was assigned to the Flying Squadron, along with the armored cruiser Marco Polo and the protected cruiser Liguria. The ships were tasked as a training squadron and were also responsible for responding to any crises that might arise. Stromboli joined the 2nd Division of the active fleet in 1897, which also included the ironclad Andrea Doria, the armored cruiser Marco Polo, the protected cruisers Etna and Liguria, and the torpedo cruisers Urania, Partenope, and Caprera.

In 1899 Stromboli was deployed to the Far East. She was joined by Vesuvio and Ettore Fieramosca, sent there in 1900 to assist the Eight-Nation Alliance in putting down the Boxer Uprising in China. All three ships were assigned to the Cruising Squadron in Chinese waters in 1901. That year, Stromboli returned to Italy and was placed in reserve, before returning to active service in 1904. That year she was in active service for seven months; she spent the rest of the year with a reduced crew, as was standard practice in the Italian fleet at the time. She later served as an ammunition ship before being struck from the Navy List on 21 March 1907 and sold for scrap in 1911.
