= Italian ironclad Duilio =

Ironclad warship of the Italian Royal Navy

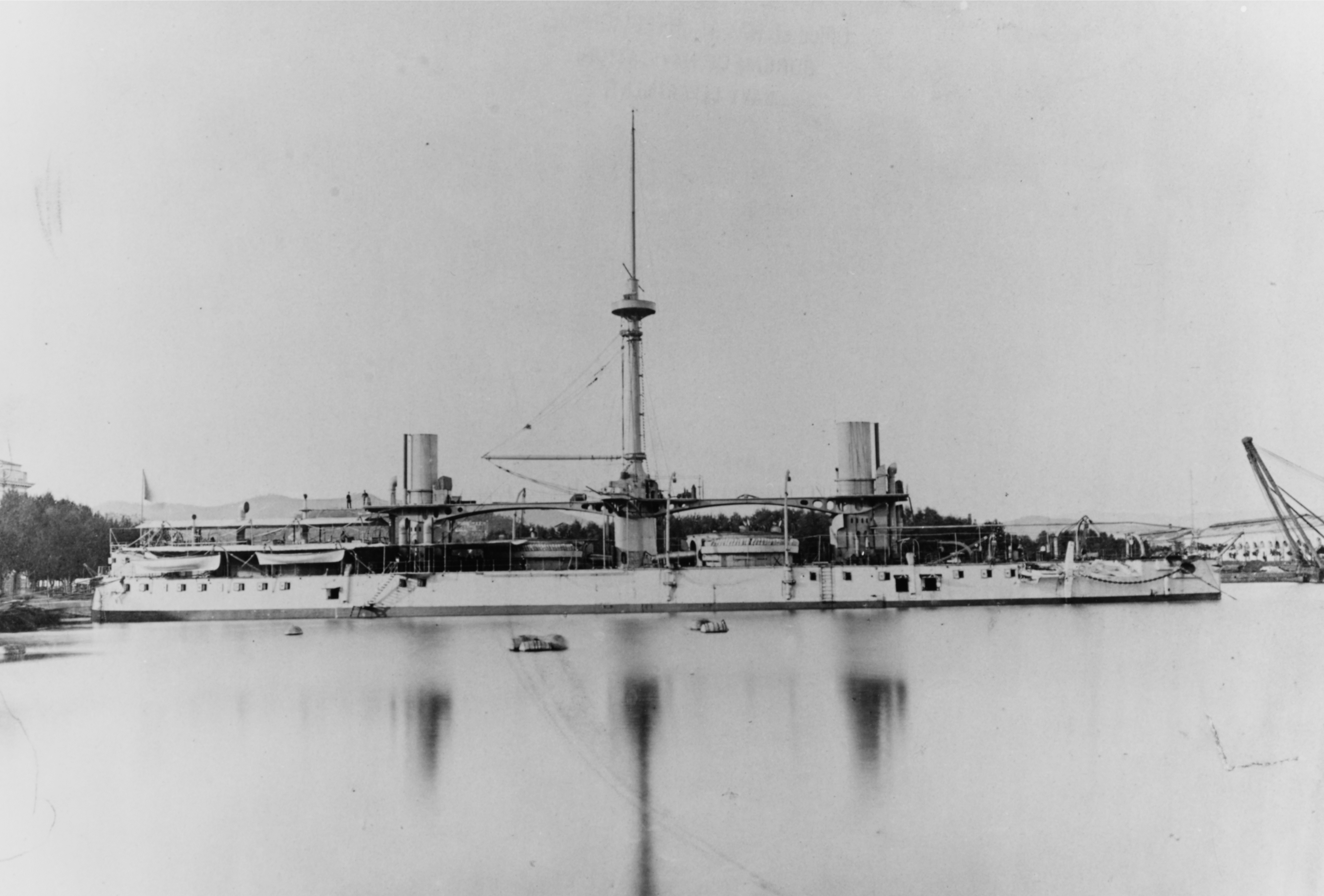
- Duilio while fitting out in 1880

History

Italy
- Name: Duilio
- Namesake: Gaius Duilius
- Laid down: 6 January 1873
- Launched: 8 May 1876
- Completed: 6 January 1880
- Fate: Hulked, 1909

General characteristics
- Class & type: Duilio-class ironclad
- Displacement: Normal: 10,962 long tons (11,138 t); Full load: 12,071 long tons (12,265 t)
- Length: 109.16 m (358 ft 2 in)
- Beam: 19.74 m (64 ft 9 in)
- Draft: 8.31 m (27 ft 3 in)
- Installed power: 8 × fire-tube boilers; 7,711 ihp (5,750 kW)
- Propulsion: 2 × marine steam engines; 2 × screw propellers
- Speed: 15.04 knots (27.85 km/h; 17.31 mph)
- Range: 3,760 nmi (6,960 km) at 10 kn (19 km/h; 12 mph)
- Complement: 420
- Armament: 4 × 450 mm (17.7 in) guns; 3 × 356 mm (14 in) torpedo tubes
- Armor: Belt: 546 mm (21.5 in); Turrets: 432 mm (17 in); Deck: 30 to 51 mm (1.2 to 2 in)

Duilio was the lead ship of the Duilio class of ironclad turret ships built for the Italian Regia Marina (Royal Navy). Named for the Roman admiral Gaius Duilius, the ship was laid down in January 1873, was launched in May 1876, and was completed in January 1880. She was armed with a main battery of four 450 mm (17.7 in) guns, then the largest gun afloat, and she was capable of a top speed of around 15 knots (28 km/h; 17 mph).

Duilio's career was uneventful. She spent her first two decades in service with the Active and Reserve Squadrons, primarily tasked with training maneuvers and exercises. She was withdrawn from front-line duty in 1902 and thereafter employed as a training ship, though this role only lasted until 1909 when she was converted into a floating oil tank and renamed GM40. The ship's ultimate fate is unknown.

== Design ==
The Duilio-class ironclads were designed by the noted Italian naval architect Benedetto Brin; they were revolutionary warships at the time they were designed, being the first ironclad battleships to be built without a sailing rig, and they marked the beginning of a trend toward larger and larger guns. Brin originally intended a main battery of four 35-long-ton (36 t) guns in a pair of turrets placed centrally, but during the course of work on the ships, he increased the size to 65 long tons (66 t) and ultimately to 100 long tons (100 t).

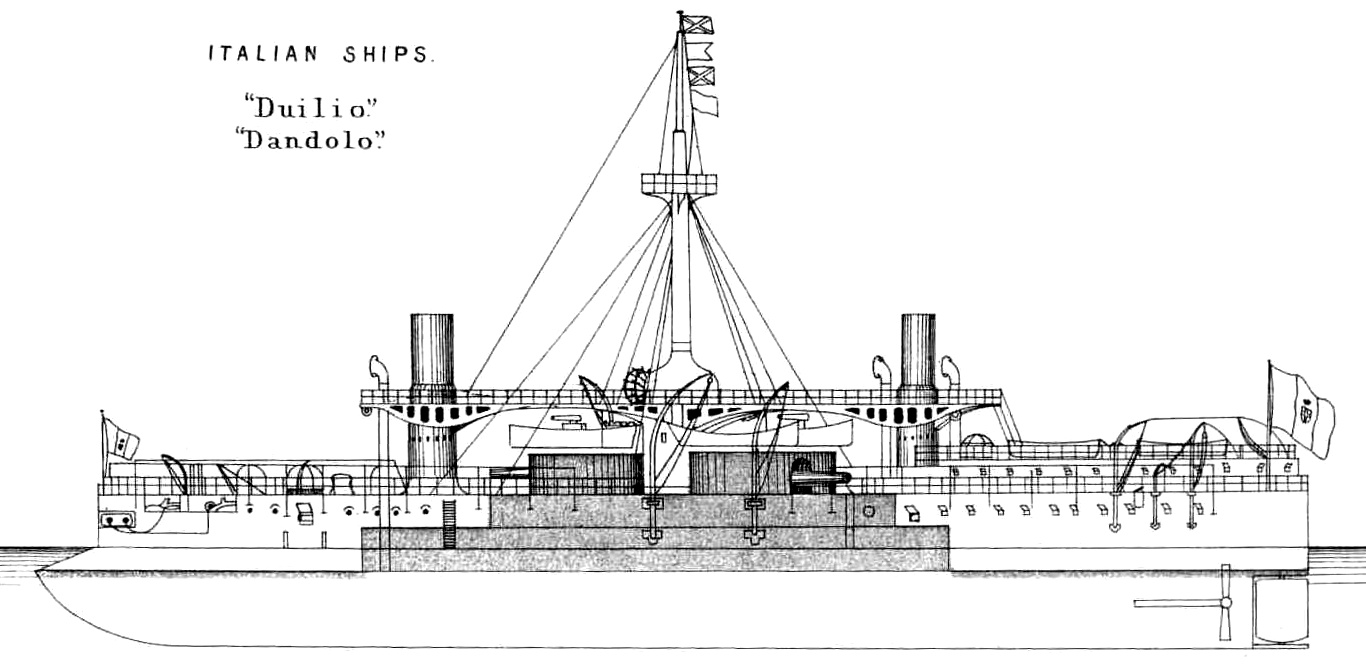
Line-drawing of the Duilio class

Duilio was 109.16 meters (358 ft 2 in) long overall and had a beam of 19.74 m (64 ft 9 in) and an average draft of 8.31 m (27 ft 3 in). She displaced 10,962 long tons (11,138 t) normally and up to 12,071 long tons (12,265 t) at full load. The ship's hull featured a straight stem and stern, along with a pronounced ram bow below the waterline. Duilio had a minimal superstructure, which included a small conning tower that was connected via a hurricane deck to a heavy military mast located amidships and another small platform further aft. She had a crew of 420 officers and men, which later increased to 515.

Her propulsion system consisted of two vertical compound steam engines each driving a single screw propeller. Steam was supplied by eight coal-fired, rectangular boilers that were divided into two boiler rooms on either end of the ship's central battery, each vented through its own funnel, which were incorporated into the ends of the hurricane deck. Her engines produced a top speed of 15.04 knots (27.85 km/h; 17.31 mph) at 7,711 indicated horsepower (5,750 kW). She could steam for 3,760 nautical miles (6,960 km; 4,330 mi) at a speed of 10 knots (19 km/h; 12 mph).

Duilio was armed with a main battery of four 450 mm (17.7 in) 20-caliber guns, mounted in two turrets placed en echelon amidships. This arrangement gave all four guns very wide fields of fire. These were the largest naval guns in use by any country at the time. As was customary for capital ships of the period, she carried three 356 mm (14 in) torpedo tubes.

Duilio was protected by belt armor that was 21.5 in (550 mm) thick at its strongest section, which protected the ship's magazines and machinery spaces. Both ends of the belt were connected by transverse bulkheads that were 400 mm (15.75 in) thick. She had an armored deck that was 28 to 51 mm (1.1 to 2 in) thick. Her gun turrets were armored with 432 mm (17 in) of steel plate. The ship's bow and stern were not armored, but they were extensively subdivided into a cellular "raft" that was intended to reduce the risk of flooding.

== Service history ==
Illustration of Duilio underway

Duilio, sometimes referred to as Caio Duilio, was laid down at the Regio Cantiere di Castellammare di Stabia shipyard in Castellammare di Stabia on 6 January 1873, the same day that the keel for her sister ship Enrico Dandolo was laid down at the Arsenale di La Spezia. Construction on Duilio proceeded much faster than on her sister; she was launched on 8 May 1876 and completed on 6 January 1880, more than two years before Enrico Dandolo would be finished. On 8 March, shortly after Duilio entered service, one of her 17.7 in guns exploded. The inexperienced gun crew had accidentally double-loaded the gun.

During the annual fleet maneuvers held in 1885, Duilio served in the 1st Division of the "Western Squadron"; she was joined by her sister Enrico Dandolo, the protected cruiser Giovanni Bausan, and a sloop. The "Western Squadron" attacked the defending "Eastern Squadron", simulating a Franco-Italian conflict, with operations conducted off Sardinia. Duilio took part in the annual 1888 fleet maneuvers, along with the ironclads Lepanto, Italia, Enrico Dandolo, and San Martino, one protected cruiser, four torpedo cruisers, and numerous smaller vessels. The maneuvers consisted of close-order drills and a simulated attack on and defense of La Spezia. Later that year, the ship was present during a naval review held for the German Kaiser Wilhelm II during a visit to Italy.

In 1890, Duilio received a secondary battery of three 120 mm (4.7 in) 40-caliber guns to defend the ship against torpedo boats. Duilio served with the 1st Division of the Reserve Squadron during the 1893 fleet maneuvers, along with the ironclad Re Umberto, which served as the divisional flagship, the torpedo cruiser Minerva, and four torpedo boats. During the maneuvers, which lasted from 6 August to 5 September, the ships of the Reserve Squadron defended against a simulated attack by the Active Squadron, which gamed a French attack on the Italian fleet. For the periodic fleet maneuvers of 1897, Duilio was assigned to the First Division of the Reserve Squadron, which also included the ironclads Ruggiero di Lauria and Lepanto and the protected cruiser Lombardia.

In 1900, the ship's secondary battery was supplemented with two 75 mm (3 in) guns, eight 57 mm (2.24 in) 40-caliber quick-firing guns, and four 37 mm (1.5 in) 20-caliber revolver cannon. By 1902, the ship had been removed from front line service and was employed as a boys' training ship; she was at that time the flagship of the Training Division. The Italian Navy had considered rebuilding the ship along the same lines as her sister Enrico Dandolo, but the cost of the project proved to be prohibitive, and by 1902 they had abandoned the plan. In early 1909, Duilio was stricken from the naval register, and on 27 June she was disarmed. The ship was converted into a coal and oil storage hulk and was renamed GM40. Her ultimate fate is unknown.
