= Italian cruiser Dogali =

Protected cruiser of the Italian Royal Navy

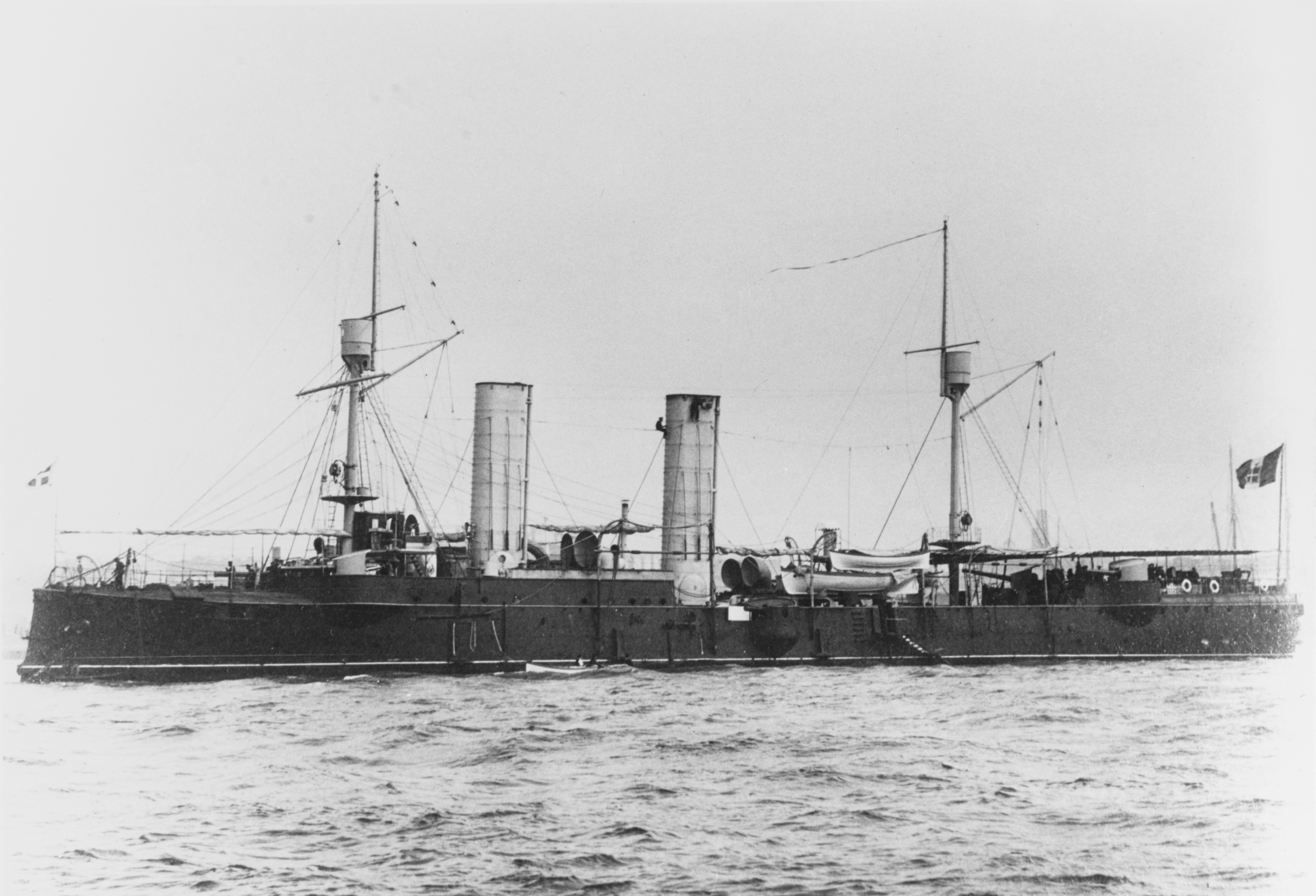
- Dogali, date unknown

Class overview
- Preceded by: Etna class
- Succeeded by: Piemonte
- Completed: 1

History

Italy
- Name: Dogali
- Builder: Armstrong Whitworth
- Laid down: 13 February 1885
- Launched: 23 December 1885
- Commissioned: 28 April 1887
- Fate: Sold to Uruguay, January 1908

History

Uruguay
- Name: 25 de Agosto; Montevideo
- Acquired: January 1908
- Out of service: 1914
- Fate: Scrapped, 1932

General characteristics
- Type: Protected cruiser
- Displacement: 2,050 long tons (2,080 t)
- Length: 76.2 m (250 ft)
- Beam: 11.28 m (37 ft)
- Draft: 4.42 m (14 ft 6 in)
- Installed power: 4 × fire-tube boilers; 5,012 ihp (3,737 kW)
- Propulsion: 2 × triple expansion steam engines; 2 × screw propellers
- Speed: 17.68 knots (32.74 km/h; 20.35 mph)
- Range: 4,000 nmi (7,400 km; 4,600 mi) at 10 knots (19 km/h; 12 mph)
- Complement: 224–247
- Armament: 6 × 152 mm (6 in) guns; 9 × 57 mm (2.24 in) guns; 6 × Gatling guns; 4 × 356 mm (14 in) torpedo tubes
- Armor: Deck: 50 mm (2 in); Conning tower: 50 mm; Gun shields: 110 mm (4.3 in)

Dogali was a unique protected cruiser built for the Italian Regia Marina (Royal Navy) in the 1880s. Notably, she was the first warship equipped with triple-expansion engines. The ship was originally ordered by the Greek Navy and named Salamis, but she was sold to the Regia Marina before she was completed and renamed for the Battle of Dogali. She was armed with a main battery of six 15-centimeter (5.9 in) guns and reached a speed of 19.66 knots (36.41 km/h; 22.62 mph) on her sea trials, making her one of the fastest cruisers at the time.

Dogali's career was uneventful; she served with the main Italian fleet for the first few years of her career and visited the United States in 1893 for the start of the World's Columbian Exposition. In January 1908, the ship was sold to Uruguay and renamed 25 de Agosto and later Montevideo. In 1914, the cruiser was withdrawn from service, but she was not disposed of until 1932 when she was sold for scrap.

== Design ==
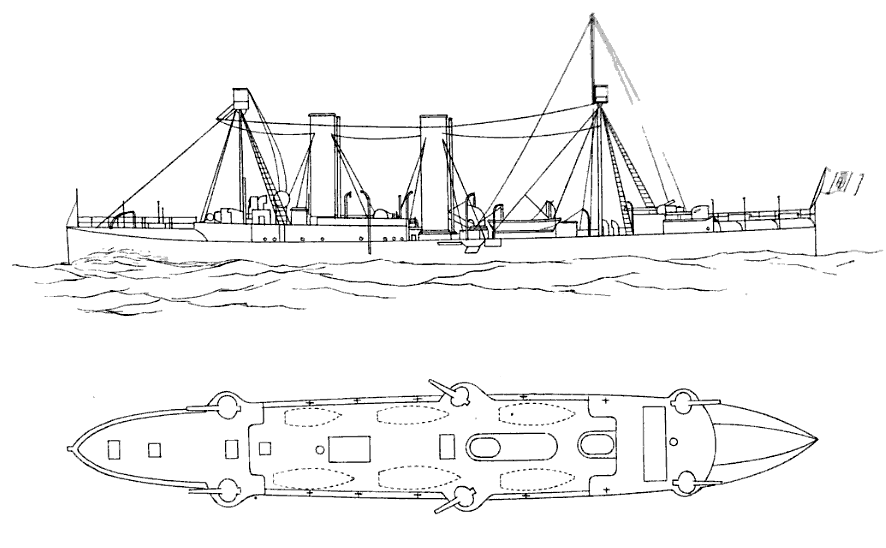
Line-drawing of Dogali

Dogali was designed by the British naval architect William Henry White and built at the Armstrong Whitworth shipyard at Elswick. The ship was 76.2 meters (250 ft) long and had a beam of 11.28 m (37 ft) and a draft of 4.42 m (14 ft 6 in). She displaced 2,050 long tons (2,080 t). The ship was fitted with two pole masts, and originally, a sailing rig that was later removed. Revolving, armored spotting tops were mounted on the masts. She had a crew of 224 officers and enlisted men, though this was later increased to 247.

Dogali was powered by two-shaft triple-expansion engines, the first set of this kind of machinery ever installed in a warship. Steam for the engines was provided by four coal-fired cylindrical fire-tube boilers that were trunked into two funnels on the centerline. The engines were rated at 5,012 indicated horsepower (3,737 kW) and could produce a top speed of 17.68 knots (32.74 km/h; 20.35 mph), though on trials her engines reached 7,179 ihp (5,353 kW) and 19.66 knots (36.41 km/h; 22.62 mph). Dogali had a cruising radius of 4,000 nautical miles (7,400 km; 4,600 mi) at a speed of 10 knots (19 km/h; 12 mph). At the time of her commissioning, Dogali was among the fastest cruisers in the world.

The ship was armed with a main battery of six 152-millimeter (6 in) L/32 guns all mounted individually in sponsons, with two side by side forward, two astern, and one amidships on each broadside. (Note: L/40 refers to the length of the gun in terms of caliber.) These were Pattern M guns manufactured by Armstrong Whitworth, and they weighed 2 t (2.0 long tons; 2.2 short tons) apiece. Dogali was the only ship equipped with guns of this type. These were supplemented by a secondary battery of nine 57 mm (2.24 in) L/40 guns and six Gatling guns. She was also equipped with four 356 mm (14 in) torpedo tubes. The ship was protected by an armored deck that was 50 mm (2 in) thick, and the conning tower had the same thickness of armor plating on the sides. The main guns were protected by 110 mm (4.3 in) thick gun shields.

== Service history ==
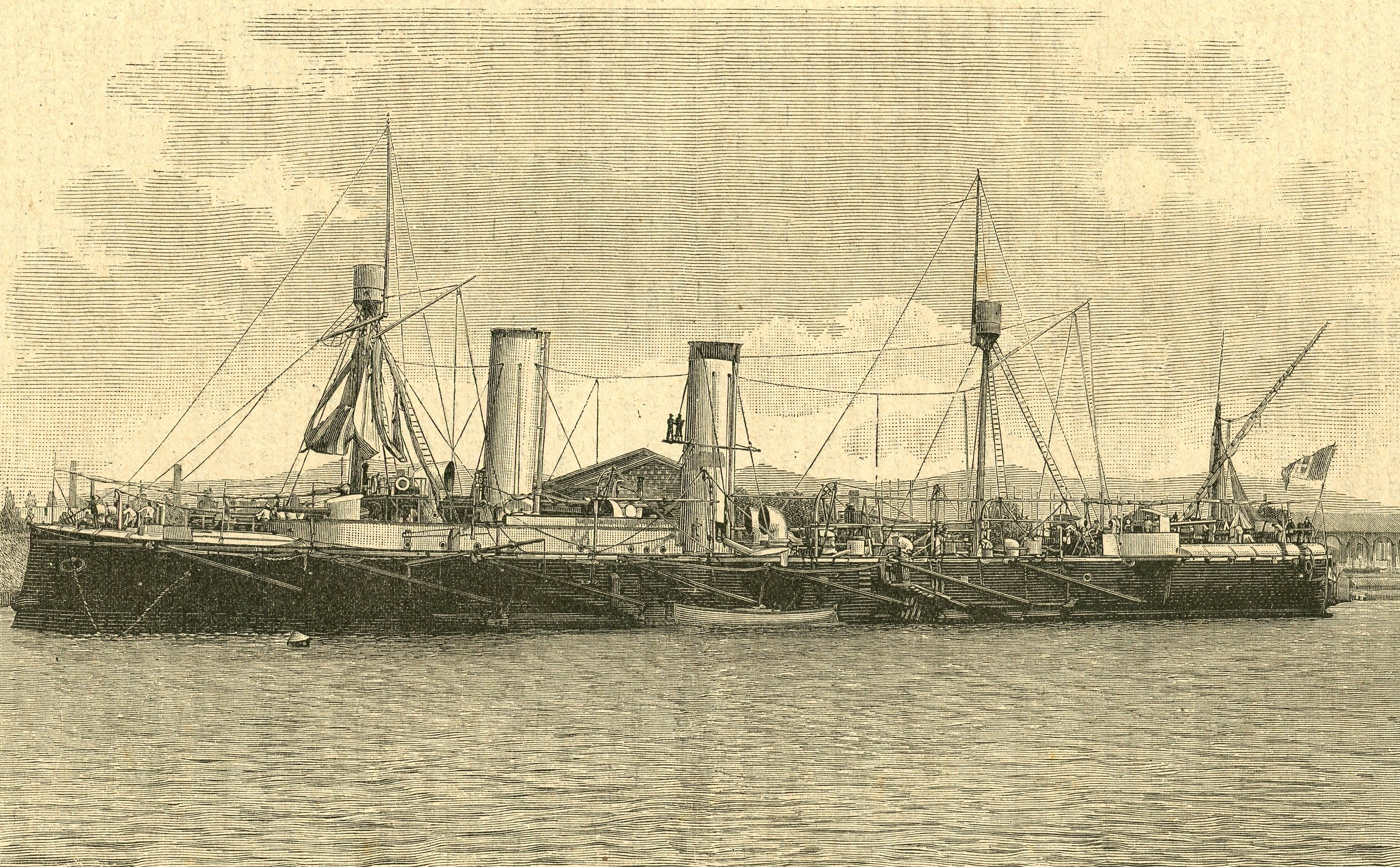
Sketch of Dogali c. 1888

The keel for the new cruiser was laid down at Armstrong Whitworth on 13 February 1885, and the completed hull was launched on 23 December that year. The ship was originally ordered by the Greek Navy and was to be named Salamis, but she was purchased by Italy during construction. She was first renamed Angelo Emo, and then Dogali before being commissioned on 28 April 1887. On 10 June, the annual fleet maneuvers began; Folgore was assigned to the "defending squadron", along with the ironclads Enrico Dandolo, Palestro, Castelfidardo, and Affondatore, the torpedo cruiser Folgore, and several smaller vessels. The first half of the maneuvers tested the ability to attack and defend the Strait of Messina, and concluded in time for a fleet review by King Umberto I on the 21st. In 1890, Dogali participated in the annual fleet maneuvers in the First Squadron, along with the ironclad Lepanto, the protected cruiser Piemonte, and several torpedo boats. The exercises were conducted in the Tyrrhenian Sea, where the First Squadron was tasked with defending against an attacking "hostile" squadron.

Dogali and the protected cruisers Etna and Giovanni Bausan represented Italy at the international naval review in New York, held at the start of the World's Columbian Exposition in Chicago in 1893. The Exposition marked the 400th anniversary of Christopher Columbus's arrival in North America. Contingents from France, Germany, Britain, Spain, and several other nations also participated in the celebration. Later that year, Dogali and Giovanni Bausan were present in Rio de Janeiro, Brazil during the Revolta da Armada (Revolt of the Fleet), along with cruisers from Britain, France, Germany, Spain, and Argentina. The foreign warships were all tasked with protecting the interests of their respective nationals in the area. After returning to Italy later in 1893, she was assigned to the 3rd Department, which was stationed in Venice; she remained there through the following year. On 1 February 1897, Dogali was assigned to the Cruiser Squadron of the main Italian fleet, along with the cruisers Marco Polo, Umbria and Liguria. Later that year, she cruised off the eastern coast of South American in company with Umbria. She remained in the Cruiser Squadron through 1903, by which time the unit also included the armored cruiser Vettor Pisani, Giovanni Bausan and the protected cruiser Etruria.

In 1906, while cruising in North American waters, Dogali stopped at the Pensacola Navy Yard, where she had some maintenance done on her engines. Later that year she was present for a ceremony in Capitán Pastene, Chile, a town founded by Italian immigrants. In January 1908, the Italian government sold Dogali to Uruguay. She was renamed 25 de Agosto for the date Uruguay declared its independence. At the time, she was the largest warship in the Uruguayan Navy. In 1910, the ship was renamed Montevideo after the country's capital city. She was decommissioned in 1914, but remained in the Uruguayan Navy's inventory until 1932, when the old cruiser was finally sold to be broken up.
