= Etna-class cruiser =

Series of protected cruisers built in the 1880s for the Royal Italian Navy

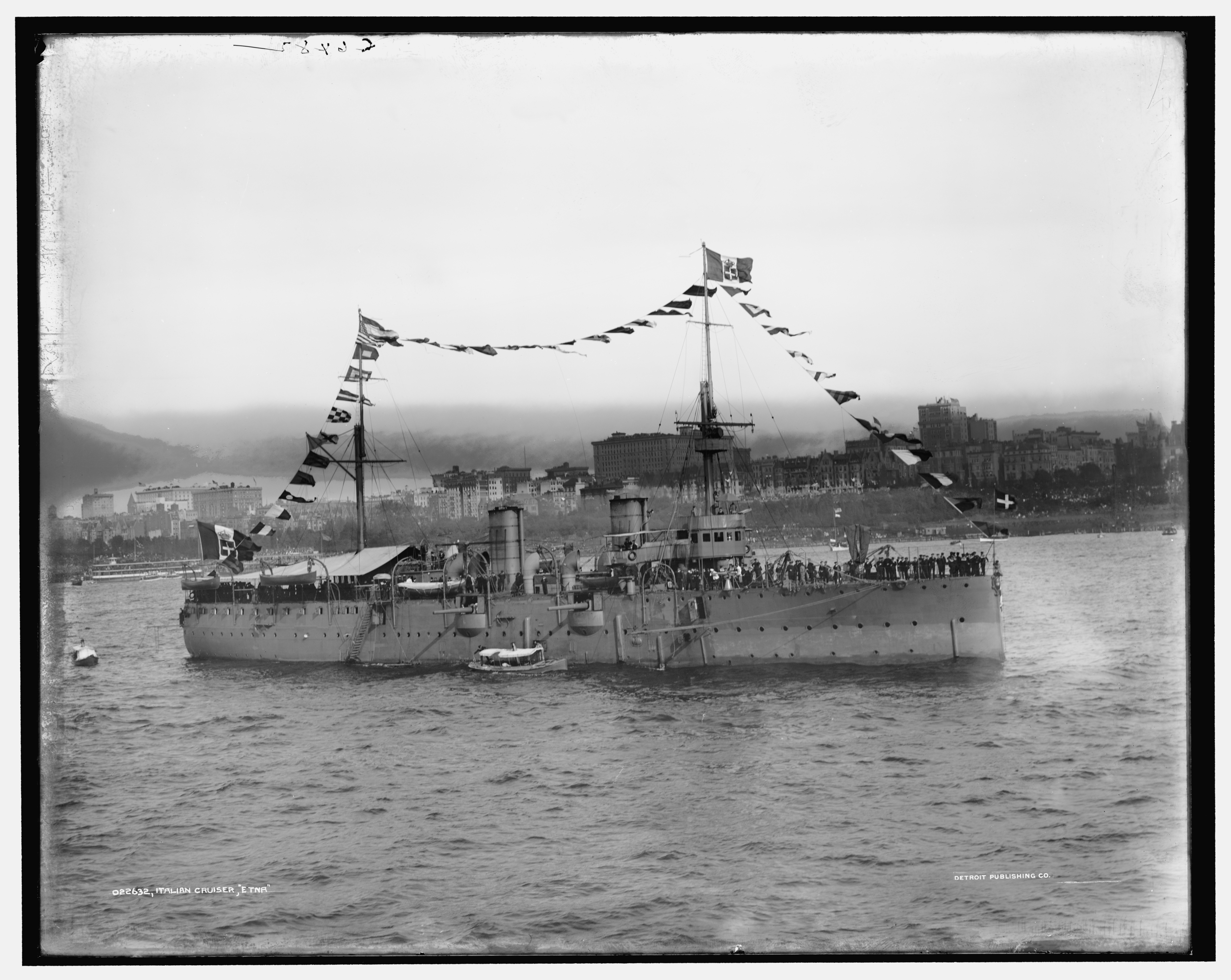
- Etna at the Hudson–Fulton Celebration, New York, 1909

Class overview
- Operators: Regia Marina
- Preceded by: Giovanni Bausan
- Succeeded by: Dogali
- Built: 1884–1889
- In commission: 1888–1920
- Planned: 4
- Completed: 4
- Scrapped: 4

General characteristics (Etna)
- Type: Protected cruiser
- Displacement: 3,474 long tons (3,530 t)
- Length: 283 ft 6 in (86.4 m)
- Beam: 42 ft 6 in (13.0 m)
- Draft: 19 ft (5.8 m)
- Installed power: 7,480 ihp (5,580 kW); 4 cylindrical boilers
- Propulsion: 2 shafts, 2 horizontal compound-steam engines
- Speed: 17 knots (31 km/h; 20 mph)
- Range: 5,000 nautical miles (9,300 km; 5,800 mi) at 10 knots
- Complement: 12 officers and 296 men
- Armament: 2 × 1 - 10-inch (25 cm)/30 guns in barbettes; 6 × 1 - 6-inch (152 mm)/32 guns; 5 × 1 - 6-pounder Hotchkiss; 5 × 1 - 1-pounder Hotchkiss guns; 4 14-inch (356 mm) torpedo tubes
- Armor: Deck: 1.5-inch (38 mm)

The Etna class was a series of protected cruisers that were built in the late 1880s for the Regia Marina (the Royal Italian Navy). The four ships built were slightly enlarged copies of the Elswick Works' design for the protected cruiser Giovanni Bausan. Etna, the lead ship of the class, was the only ship still in service when World War I began, although she served as a stationary headquarters ship for the Navy Commander-in-Chief in Taranto for the duration of the war. The three later ships all participated in putting down the Boxer Rebellion as part of the Eight-Nation Alliance. The three were struck from the Navy List before 1912, but Etna was not sold for scrap until 1921.

== Design and description ==
The design of the Etna-class protected cruisers was based on that of Sir W G Armstrong Mitchell & Co.'s Elswick Works' earlier Giovanni Bausan, which was the first modern protected cruiser constructed for the Italian Navy. She proved successful enough that the Italians negotiated for a license to build copies in Italian shipyards. George Rendel and Carlo Vigna designed the ships. The first three ships varied somewhat in their displacement and engine power, and the last ship, Ettore Fieramosca, was slightly longer than the others.

The Etna-class ships measured 283 feet 6 inches (86.4 m) between perpendiculars, with a beam of 42 feet 6 inches (13.0 m). They had a mean draft of 19 feet (5.8 m) and displaced between 3,373–3,474 long tons (3,427–3,530 t). They carried a crew of 12 officers and 296 men. Ettore Fieramosca was 290 feet (88.4 m) between perpendiculars and had a beam of 43 feet 4 inches (13.2 m). She had a draft of 18 feet 9 inches (5.7 m) and displaced 3,538 long tons (3,595 t). Her crew consisted of 17 officers and 298 men.

=== Propulsion ===
The Etna-class cruisers had two horizontal compound steam engines, each driving a single propeller. Their engines were powered by four double-ended cylindrical boilers. On sea trials the engines produced a total between 6,252–7,480 indicated horsepower (4,662–5,578 kW) and the ships reached between 17–17.8 knots (31.5–33.0 km/h; 19.6–20.5 mph). The ships carried between 575–620 long tons (584–630 t) of coal which allowed them to steam for 5,000 nautical miles (9,300 km; 5,800 mi) at a speed of 10 knots (19 km/h; 12 mph).

=== Armament and armor ===
The main armament of the ships consisted of two Armstrong 10-inch (254 mm), 30-caliber breech-loading guns mounted in barbettes fore and aft. Each gun had an approximate firing arc of 240°. "To load, the gun was laid fore and aft in line with a fixed armored deckhouse into which ammunition was hoisted from below." They fired a 450-pound (200 kg) shell at a muzzle velocity of 2,060 ft/s (630 m/s). The six 6-inch (152 mm), 32-caliber, breech-loading guns were carried in sponsons along the sides of the ships in Vavasseur mountings. The guns fired a shell that weighed 100 pounds (45 kg) at a muzzle velocity of 1,940 ft/s (590 m/s).

For anti-torpedo boat defense the first three ships mounted five 57-millimeter (2.2 in) 6-pounder Hotchkiss guns. Each shell weighed about 6 lb (2.7 kg) and could be fired at 20 rounds per minute. Their muzzle velocity of 1,765 ft/s (538 m/s) gave them a range of about 8,700 meters (9,500 yd). Another five 37-millimeter (1.5 in) 1-pounder Hotchkiss guns were also carried. They fired a shell weighing about 500 g (1.1 lb) at a muzzle velocity of about 610 m/s (2,000 ft/s) to a range of about 3,200 meters (3,500 yd). They had a rate of fire of about 30 rounds per minute Etna, Stromboli, and Vesuvio were fitted with four 14-inch (356 mm) torpedo tubes. One was mounted in the bow underwater and the other three were above water. Ettore Fieramosca's anti-torpedo boat armament differed slightly from that of her half-sisters. She carried six 6-pounder and eight 1-pounder Hotchkiss guns, but only three torpedo tubes.

The cruisers were fitted with an armored deck below the waterline with a maximum thickness of 1.5 inches (38 mm) and had a belt of cork at their waterline, which was intended to seal holes by swelling through water absorption after being hit. This proved to be unsuccessful as hits would result in the destruction of the cork and it tended to deteriorate quickly. The breech and loading area of the main guns was protected by an armored hood 2 inches (51 mm) thick.

== Construction ==
Construction data
Ship	Builder	Laid down	Launched	Commissioned	Fate
Etna	Castellammare	19 January 1884	26 September 1885	2 December 1887	Sold for scrap 1921
Stromboli	Venice	31 August 1884	4 February 1886	20 March 1888	Sold for scrap 1911
Vesuvio	Livorno	10 July 1884	21 March 1886	16 March 1888	Sold for scrap 1915
Ettore Fieramosca	Livorno	31 December 1885	30 August 1888	16 November 1889	Struck July 1909

== Operational history ==
Etna served in the Squadra Permamente (Permanent Squadron) from her commissioning to 1893 and then served in North and South American waters until the end of 1895. From April to June 1893, she participated in the International Naval Review at Hampton Roads that was part of the Columbian Exposition. Afterward she was stationed in the Red Sea during the First Italo-Ethiopian War of 1895–1896 and then supported Italian interests during the Cretan Revolt of 1898. The ship was then transferred to the Far East, returning home in 1902. Etna was disarmed that same year and she was flagship of the Superior Torpedo-Boat Command in 1904. The ship was rebuilt between 1905 and 1907, her superstructure was enlarged and she was given two 4.7-inch (120 mm) guns, one each fore and aft, as well as four 6-inch guns in her waist, two per side. In 1909 she participated in the Hudson–Fulton Celebration along with the cruiser Etruria. She served as a training ship after her rebuild until the start of World War I when she became the stationary flagship of the Commander-in-Chief in Taranto for the duration of the war. Etna was disarmed again in 1920 and sold for scrap in 1921.

Stromboli, Vesuvio and Ettore Fieramosca participated in the 1893 Naval Maneuvers as part of the Squadron of Maneuvers. Stomboli and Ettore Fieramosca next participated in the 1896 Naval Maneuvers as part of the Maneuver Fleet. Stromboli was sent to the Far East in 1899 while Vesuvio and Ettore Fieramosca were sent there in 1900 to assist in putting down the Boxer Rebellion. All three ships were assigned to the Cruising Squadron in Chinese waters in 1901.

Stromboli returned to Italy in 1901 and was placed in reserve and served as an ammunition ship before being struck from the Navy List in 1907 and sold for scrap in 1911. After a second posting in the Far East, Vesuvio was placed in reserve, struck from the Navy List in 1911 and sold for scrap in 1915. Ettore Fieramosca returned to Italy and made a cruise off East Africa in 1905. She then sailed across the Atlantic and made a number of port visits in South America. The ship was then assigned to the American Squadron and refitted in Boston in November 1906. Upon her return to Italy in 1909 Ettore Fieramosca was struck off the Navy List in July 1909 and sold.
