= Italian ironclad Lepanto =

Ironclad warship of the Italian Royal Navy

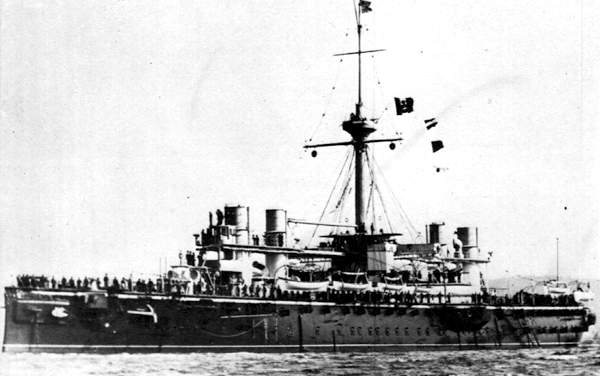
- Lepanto in La Spezia

History

Italy
- Name: Lepanto
- Namesake: The Battle of Lepanto
- Operator: Regia Marina (Italian Royal Navy)
- Builder: Cantiere navale fratelli Orlando, Livorno
- Laid down: 4 November 1876
- Launched: 17 March 1883
- Completed: 16 August 1887
- Stricken: 26 May 1912
- Reinstated: 13 January 1913
- Stricken: 15 January 1914
- Fate: Sold for scrapping 27 March 1915

General characteristics
- Class & type: Italia-class ironclad
- Displacement: Normal: 13,336 long tons (13,550 t); Full load: 15,649 long tons (15,900 t)
- Length: 124.7 m (409 ft) length overall
- Beam: 22.34 m (73 ft 4 in)
- Draft: 9.39 m (30 ft 10 in)
- Installed power: 15,797 ihp (11,780 kW); 26 fire-tube boilers
- Propulsion: 4 × compound steam engines; 4 × screw propellers
- Speed: 18.4 knots (34.1 km/h; 21.2 mph)
- Range: ca. 5,000 nautical miles (9,260 km) at 10 knots (19 km/h; 12 mph)
- Complement: 37 officers; 656 enlisted men
- Armament: 4 × 432 mm (17 in) guns; 8 × 152 mm (6 in) guns; 4 × 119 mm (4.7 in) guns; 4 × 356 mm (14 in) torpedo tubes
- Armor: Deck: 102 mm (4 in); Barbette: 483 mm (19 in); Conning tower: 102 mm

Lepanto was an Italian ironclad battleship built for the Italian Regia Marina (Royal Navy), the second and last ship of the Italia class. Lepanto was laid down in November 1876, launched in March 1883, and completed in August 1887. She was armed with a main battery of four 432 mm (17 in) guns mounted in a central barbette and was capable of a top speed of 17.8 knots (33.0 km/h; 20.5 mph). Unlike other capital ships of the era, Lepanto had an armored deck rather than the more typical belt armor.

Lepanto spent the first two decades of her career in the Active and Reserve Squadrons, where she took part in annual training maneuvers with the rest of the fleet. In 1902, she was withdrawn from service for use as a training ship. During the Italo-Turkish War of 1911–1912, the ship provided fire support to Italian troops defending Tripoli in Libya. Lepanto was ultimately stricken from the naval register in January 1914 and sold for scrapping in March 1915.

== Design ==
The Italia class, designed by Benedetto Brin, was ordered in the mid-1870s as part of a naval construction program aimed at countering the Austro-Hungarian Navy. They were based on the preceding Italian design, the Duilio class, though they incorporated several significant improvements. These included more powerful main guns, higher freeboard, and greater speed. Their speed came at the expense of armor protection, and their hulls carried only light deck plating.

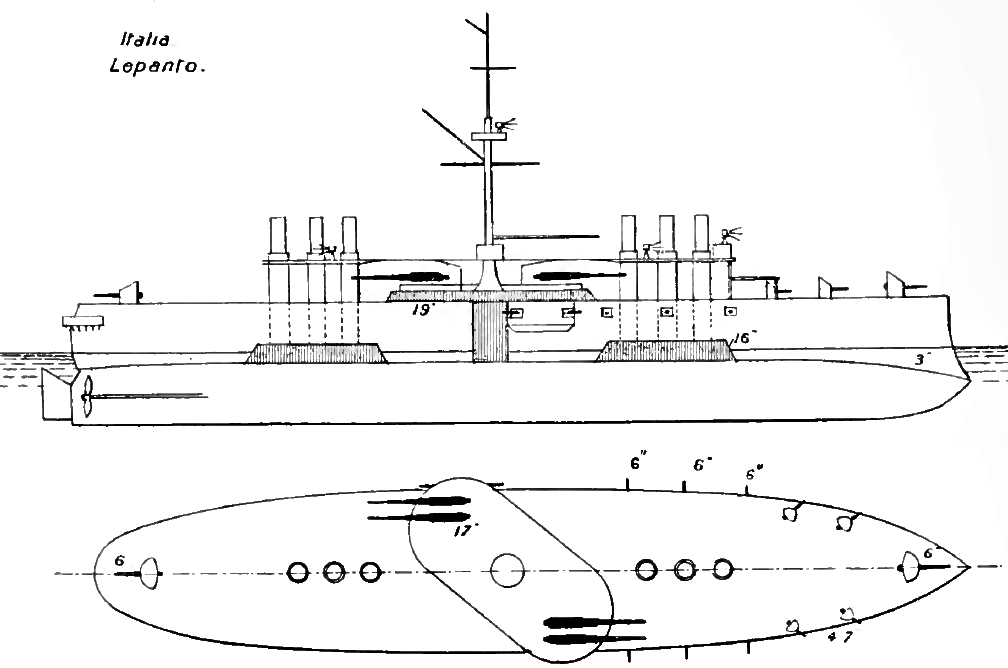
Plan and profile drawing of Italia; Lepanto had four funnels instead of six

Lepanto was 124.7 meters (409 ft) long overall and had a beam of 22.34 m (73 ft 4 in) and an average draft of 9.39 m (30 ft 10 in). She displaced 13,336 long tons (13,550 t) normally and up to 15,649 long tons (15,900 t) at full load. She had a crew of 37 officers and 656 enlisted men.

Her propulsion system consisted of four compound steam engines each driving a single screw propeller, with steam supplied by eight coal-fired, oval boilers and sixteen fire-tube boilers. Her engines produced a top speed of 18.4 knots (34.1 km/h; 21.2 mph) at 15,797 indicated horsepower (11,780 kW). She could steam for 5,000 nautical miles (9,300 km; 5,800 mi) at a speed of 10 knots (19 km/h; 12 mph).

Lepanto was armed with a main battery of four 432 mm (17 in) 27-caliber guns, mounted in two pairs en echelon in a central barbette. She carried a secondary battery of eight 152 mm (6 in) 32-caliber guns and four 119 mm (4.7 in) 32-caliber guns. As was customary for capital ships of the period, she carried four 356 mm (14 in) torpedo tubes in the hull above the waterline, two per broadside.

Unlike other ships built at the time, Lepanto dispensed with vertical belt armor. Brin believed that contemporary steel alloys could not effectively defeat armor-piercing shells of the day, and so he discarded it completely. Lepanto was instead protected by an armored deck that was 76 to 102 mm (3 to 4 in) thick. Her conning tower was armored with 300 mm (11.8 in) of compound armor plate on the sides. The barbette had 480 mm (19 in) of compound armor.

== Service history ==
=== Construction–1895 ===
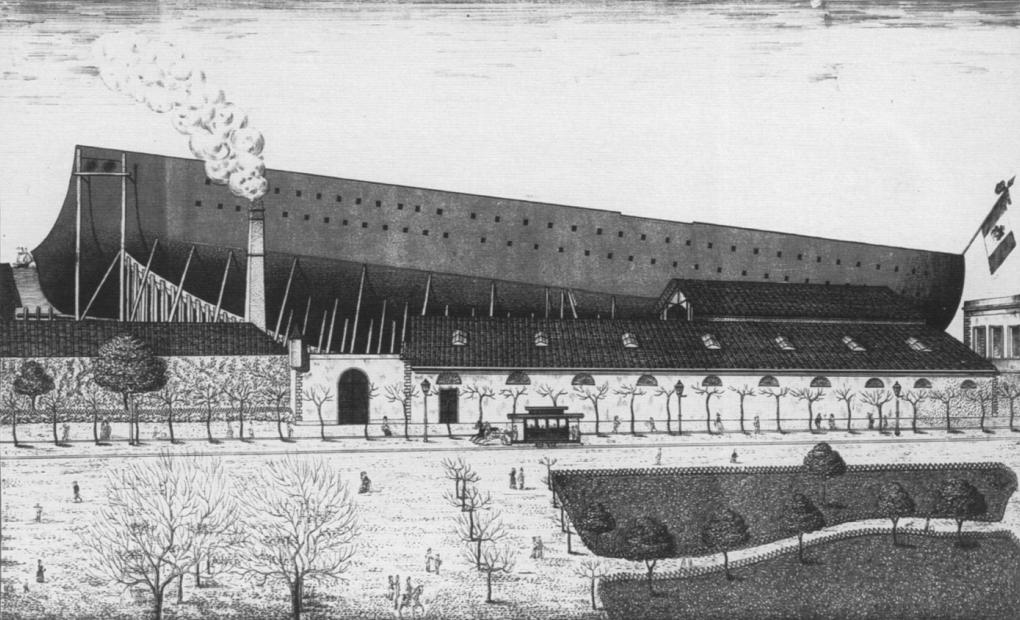
Drawing of Lepanto under construction at Orlando

Lepanto, named for the Battle of Lepanto of 1571, was under construction for nearly 11 years. (Note: In comparison, the preceding ironclad Duilio took only seven years to build, and the subsequent ironclad Ruggiero di Lauria took less than six and a half years.) She was laid down at the Cantiere navale fratelli Orlando shipyard at Livorno on 4 November 1876, ten months after her sister Italia. She spent nearly six-and-a-half years on the building ways and was not launched until 17 March 1883, two-and-a-half years after Italia. Lepanto was not completed for another four-and-a-half years, her construction finally being finished on 16 August 1887, twenty-two months after the completion of Italia. She thereafter conducted sea trials through May 1888.

On 14 May 1888, Lepanto was assigned to the Permanent Squadron (Squadra Permaente), in time to take part in the annual fleet maneuvers, along with the ironclads Duilio, Italia, Enrico Dandolo, and San Martino, a protected cruiser, four torpedo cruisers, and numerous smaller vessels. The maneuvers consisted of close-order drills and a simulated attack on and defense of La Spezia. Later that year, the ship was present during a naval review held for the German Kaiser Wilhelm II during a visit to Italy. She remained in the unit for the next two years. In 1890, Lepanto participated in the annual fleet maneuvers in the First Squadron, along with the protected cruisers Piemonte and Dogali and several torpedo boats. The exercises were conducted in the Tyrrhenian Sea, where the First Squadron was tasked with defending against an attacking "hostile" squadron.

In 1891, she was placed in reserve, where she remained until being recommissioned in April 1892. The ship served as the flagship of Permanent Squadron in 1893, flying the flag of Vice Admiral Prince Thomas, Duke of Genoa. On 27 April, Lepanto hosted King Umberto I of Italy and Kaiser Wilhelm II during the latter's visit to Italy. She took part in that year's maneuvers along with the ironclad Ruggiero di Lauria, the torpedo cruisers Euridice and Monzambano, and four torpedo boats. During the maneuvers, which lasted from 6 August to 5 September, the ships of the Active Squadron simulated a French attack on the Italian fleet. Lepanto nearly collided with her sister ship Italia during the exercises. Beginning on 14 October 1894, the Italian fleet, including Lepanto, assembled in Genoa for a naval review held in honor of King Umberto I at the commissioning of the new ironclad Re Umberto. The festivities lasted three days.

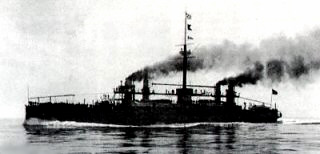
Lepanto in the Mediterranean Sea in the late 1880s

In February 1895, Italia and Lepanto were assigned to the Reserve Squadron, along with the ironclads Ruggiero di Lauria and Re Umberto. That year, unrest in the Ottoman Empire that killed hundreds of foreign nationals prompted several of the European great powers to send an international fleet to pressure the Ottomans into compensating the victims. In November 1895, a small Italian squadron sent to Smyrna to join the fleet in there; Lepanto was mobilized as part of a larger force in Naples that consisted of the ironclads Francesco Morosini, and Ruggiero di Lauria, the protected cruiser Elba, the torpedo cruisers Calatafimi and Folgore, and five torpedo boats. This second squadron was stocked with coal and ammunition in the event that it would need to reinforce the squadron at Smryna.

=== 1897–1915 ===
Lepanto operated as a training ship for bridge personnel from 26 March to 20 July 1896. In June 1897, Lepanto steamed to Britain to represent Italy at the Fleet Review for Queen Victoria's Diamond Jubilee. For the periodic fleet maneuvers later that year, Lepanto was assigned to the First Division of the Reserve Squadron, which also included the ironclads Duilio and Ruggiero di Lauria and the protected cruiser Lombardia. The following year, the Reserve Squadron consisted of Lepanto, Ruggiero di Lauria, Francesco Morosini, and five cruisers. In 1899, Lepanto, Re Umberto, Sicilia, and the three Ruggiero di Lauria-class ironclads served in the Active Squadron, which was kept in service for eight months of the year, with the remainder spent with reduced crews.

In the early 1890s, the Italian Navy had considered rebuilding Lepanto along the same lines as Enrico Dandolo, which had received new, quick-firing 250 mm (10 in) guns in place of her slow 432 mm guns. Lepanto and her sister were to have their guns replaced with new 340 mm (13.4 in) guns, but by 1902 this plan had been abandoned as too costly. Lepanto was instead withdrawn from front-line service in March that year and she became a gunnery training ship based in La Spezia. By that time, her armament consisted of her original 432 mm guns and four of her 119 mm guns; to these, nine 57 mm (2.24 in) 40-caliber guns, six 37 mm (1.5 in) 25-caliber guns, and two machine guns had been added. Her torpedo tubes had been removed by this time. Lepanto was assigned to the Training Squadron in 1904, along with the old ironclads Castelfidardo and Affondatore and the screw corvettes Flavio Gioia and Caracciolo. During the annual fleet maneuvers in September and October 1907, Lepanto was present to carry observers of the exercises, though she did not directly take part in the training.

Lepanto served in as a gunnery training vessel until 16 October 1910, when she was reduced to a barracks ship. At the start of the Italo-Turkish War of 1911–1912, Lepanto was assigned to the 5th Division of the Italian fleet, along with her sister Italia and the ironclad Enrico Dandolo. In December 1911, Italia and Lepanto were prepared to be sent to Tripoli, to replace the three Re Umberto-class ironclads. There, they were to support the Italian garrison that had captured the city. The Italian Navy planned to send the two ships in large part because it had a large stockpile of 432 mm shells, but the plan was never actually carried out. Lepanto was struck from the naval register on 26 May 1912, but was reinstated on 21 January 1913 as a first-class auxiliary ship. During this period, she was used to train apprentices and various specialists at La Spezia. She was stricken a second time on 1 January 1914, sold for scrap on 27 March 1915, and subsequently broken up.
