= Italian cruiser Folgore =

Torpedo cruiser of the Italian Royal Navy

- Folgore early in her career

History

Kingdom of Italy
- Name: Folgore
- Builder: Regio Cantiere di Castellammare di Stabia
- Launched: 29 September 1886
- Commissioned: 16 February 1887
- Stricken: 12 April 1900
- Fate: Broken up, 1900

General characteristics
- Class & type: Folgore-class torpedo cruiser
- Displacement: 364 long tons (370 t)
- Length: 56.7 meters (186 ft)
- Beam: 6.31 m (20 ft 8 in)
- Draft: 2.15 m (7 ft 1 in)
- Installed power: 4 × locomotive boilers; 2,150 indicated horsepower (1,600 kW)
- Propulsion: 2 × double-expansion steam engines; 2 × screw propellers
- Speed: 17 knots (31 km/h; 20 mph)
- Complement: 57–70
- Armament: 3 × 14 in (356 mm) torpedo tubes; 2 × 57 mm (2.24 in) guns; 4 × 37 mm (1.5 in) guns

Folgore was a torpedo cruiser built for the Italian Regia Marina (Royal Navy), the lead ship of the Folgore class. Armed with three 14 in (356 mm) torpedo tubes and six light guns, she was capable of a top speed of 17 knots (31 km/h; 20 mph). She was built in the mid-1880s, was launched in September 1886, and was completed in February 1887. The ship spent her first two years in service either conducting training maneuvers with the main Italian fleet or in reserve status. She was badly damaged in a collision with the cruiser Giovanni Bausan in 1889, which reduced her effectiveness and cut her career short. Folgore spent the next eleven years primarily in the reserve, until she was sold for scrap in April 1901 and broken up.

== Design ==
Folgore was 56.7 meters (186 ft) long overall and had a beam of 6.31 m (20 ft 8 in) and an average draft of 2.15 m (7 ft 1 in). She displaced 364 long tons (370 t) normally. Her propulsion system consisted of a pair of horizontal double-expansion steam engines each driving a single screw propeller, with steam supplied by four coal-fired locomotive boilers. Folgore could steam at a speed of 17 knots (31 km/h; 20 mph) from 2,150 indicated horsepower (1,600 kW). She had a crew of between 57 and 70.

The primary armament for Folgore was three 14 in (356 mm) torpedo tubes. For defense against torpedo boats, she was also equipped with two 57 mm (2.24 in) /43 guns, two 47 mm (1.9 in) guns and four 37 mm (1.5 in) /25 guns, all mounted singly. The ship carried no armor protection.

== Service history ==
Folgore was built at the Regio Cantiere di Castellammare di Stabia (Royal Dockyard in Castellammare di Stabia). She was launched on 29 September 1886 and was completed on 16 February 1887. On 10 June, the annual fleet maneuvers began; Folgore was assigned to the "defending squadron", along with the ironclads Enrico Dandolo, Palestro, Castelfidardo, and Affondatore, the protected cruiser Dogali, and several smaller vessels. The first half of the maneuvers tested the ability to attack and defend the Strait of Messina, and concluded in time for a fleet review by King Umberto I on the 21st. The second phase consisted of joint maneuvers with the Italian Army; Folgore and the torpedo cruiser Tripoli were tasked with blockading Livorno. The exercises lasted until 30 July.

The following year, she took part in the annual fleet maneuvers, along with five ironclads, a protected cruiser, the torpedo cruisers Tripoli, Goito, and Saetta, and numerous smaller vessels. The maneuvers consisted of close-order drills and a simulated attack on and defense of La Spezia. Later that year, the ship was present during a naval review held for the German Kaiser Wilhelm II during a visit to Italy. The ship's career was cut short on 5 July 1889, when she collided with the protected cruiser Giovanni Bausan while the two ships were steaming off Capri. Folgore was badly damaged, and she could not be restored to her original capabilities. She was accordingly laid up.

Folgore was briefly recommissioned to take part in the annual fleet maneuvers in 1894, along with her sister ship Saetta. After two months in service, both vessels returned to the reserve. As of 1895, she was located in La Spezia, along with Saetta. That year, unrest in the Ottoman Empire that killed hundreds of foreign nationals prompted several of the European great powers to send an international fleet to pressure the Ottomans into compensating the victims. In November, a small Italian squadron was sent to Smyrna to join the fleet in there; Folgore was mobilized as part of a larger force in Naples that consisted of the ironclads Francesco Morosini, Lepanto, and Ruggiero di Lauria, the protected cruiser Elba, the torpedo cruiser Calatafimi, and five torpedo boats. This second squadron was stocked with coal and ammunition in the event that it would need to reinforce the squadron at Smryna. She remained in reserve until 12 April 1900, when the Regia Marina sold the ship for scrap. Folgore was thereafter broken up.
