= Folgore-class cruiser =

Torpedo cruiser class of the Italian Royal Navy

- Folgore early in her career

Class overview
- Operators: Kingdom of Italy
- Preceded by: Goito class
- Succeeded by: Partenope class
- In commission: 1887–1908
- Completed: 2
- Scrapped: 2

General characteristics
- Type: Torpedo cruiser
- Displacement: 364 long tons (370 t)
- Length: 56.7 meters (186 ft)
- Beam: 6.31 m (20 ft 8 in)
- Draft: 2.15 m (7 ft 1 in)
- Installed power: 4 × locomotive boilers; 2,150 indicated horsepower (1,600 kW)
- Propulsion: 2 × double-expansion steam engines; 2 × screw propellers
- Speed: 17 knots (31 km/h; 20 mph)
- Complement: 57–70
- Armament: 3 × 14 in (356 mm) torpedo tubes; 2 × 57 mm (2.24 in) guns; 4 × 37 mm (1.5 in) guns

The Folgore class was a pair of torpedo cruisers built for the Italian Regia Marina (Royal Navy) in the 1880s. The two ships—Folgore and Saetta—were designed by Benedetto Brin during a period of experimentation with the theories of the Jeune École in the 1880s. The vessels were armed with three 14 in (356 mm) torpedo tubes, and they had a top speed of 17 knots (31 km/h; 20 mph). Both ships' careers were uneventful, and they spent most of their time in service conducting training exercises. Folgore was seriously damaged in a collision in 1889, and was thereafter reduced to reserve status, as the damage could not be completely repaired. She was eventually sold for scrapping in 1900, while Saetta served as a gunnery training ship from 1897 to 1908, when she too was dismantled.

== Design ==
Folgore and Saetta were designed by Benedetto Brin; Brin had previously designed several classes of very large ironclad battleships, including the Duilio and Italia classes, but by the 1880s, he had begun to embrace the ideas of the Jeune École, which emphasized small, fast, torpedo-armed vessels that could damage or destroy the much larger battleships at a fraction of the cost. After the two Folgores, which were rated as torpediniere-avisos (torpedo-avisos), the eight ships of the Partenope class were laid down, continuing Brin's ideas at the time.

=== Characteristics ===
Saetta in 1905

The ships of the Folgore class were 56.7 meters (186 ft) long overall and had a beam of 6.31 m (20 ft 8 in). Folgore displaced 364 long tons (370 t) normally, while Saetta displaced 394 long tons (400 t). Folgore had an average draft of 2.15 m (7 ft 1 in), while Saetta sat slightly lower in the water as a result of her greater displacement, with a draft of 2.27 m (7 ft 5 in). Their hulls were constructed from steel and featured a pronounced ram bow. The ships had a crew of between 57 and 70 that varied in size over the course of their careers.

Her propulsion system consisted of a pair of horizontal double-expansion steam engines manufactured by Hawthorn Leslie and Co., each driving a single screw propeller. Steam for the engines was supplied by four coal-fired locomotive boilers that were trunked into a single funnel amidships. In 1892, Saetta was re-boilered with oil-fired models for experimentation purposes. Folgore could steam at a speed of 17 knots (31 km/h; 20 mph) from 2,150 indicated horsepower (1,600 kW), while Saetta reached the same speed from 2,130 ihp (1,590 kW). The ships had a coal storage capacity of 60 metric tons (59 long tons; 66 short tons).

The primary armament for the Folgore class was three 14 in (356 mm) torpedo tubes. They also carried a small gun armament for defense against torpedo boats, consisting of two 57 mm (2.24 in) 43-caliber (cal.) guns, two 47 mm (1.9 in) guns and four 37 mm (1.5 in) 25-cal. guns, all mounted singly. The ships carried no armor protection.

== Ships ==
Saetta at anchor

Construction data
Name	Builder	Laid down	Launched	Completed
Folgore	Regio Cantiere di Castellammare di Stabia, Castellammare di Stabia	Unknown	29 September 1886	16 February 1887
Saetta	Regio Cantiere di Castellammare di Stabia, Castellammare di Stabia	Unknown	30 May 1887	16 February 1888

== Service history ==
After entering service, both vessels were assigned to the main Italian fleet. They were primarily occupied with annual training exercises, along with occasional fleet reviews for monarchs, including one for the King of Italy, Umberto I in 1887 and German Emperor Wilhelm II in 1888. In 1889, Folgore was badly damaged in a collision with the protected cruiser Giovanni Bausan and could not be repaired to her original condition. As a result, she spent most of the rest of her career in reserve.

For much of the 1890s, Saetta was frequently reduced to reserve, in part to reduce maintenance on the vessel. Folgore made a temporary return to active service in 1895, when she joined Saetta for the annual maneuvers. In 1897, she was withdrawn from front-line service and employed with the gunnery school; her gun armament was accordingly increased in 1902 to provide a variety of weapons for gunnery trainees to practice operating. In the meantime, Folgore was stricken from the naval register in 1900 and broken up for scrap. Saetta continued in her service with the gunnery school until 1908, when she too was broken up.
