= Italian cruiser Saetta =

Torpedo cruiser of the Italian Royal Navy

- Saetta, date unknown

History

Kingdom of Italy
- Name: Saetta
- Builder: Regio Cantiere di Castellammare di Stabia
- Launched: 30 May 1887
- Commissioned: 16 February 1888
- Stricken: 14 May 1908
- Fate: Broken up, 1908

General characteristics
- Class & type: Folgore-class torpedo cruiser
- Displacement: 364 long tons (370 t)
- Length: 56.7 meters (186 ft)
- Beam: 6.31 m (20 ft 8 in)
- Draft: 2.15 m (7 ft 1 in)
- Installed power: 4 × locomotive boilers; 2,150 indicated horsepower (1,600 kW)
- Propulsion: 2 × double-expansion steam engines; 2 × screw propellers
- Speed: 17 knots (31 km/h; 20 mph)
- Complement: 57–70
- Armament: 3 × 14 in (356 mm) torpedo tubes; 2 × 57 mm (2.24 in) guns; 4 × 37 mm (1.5 in) guns

Saetta was a torpedo cruiser of the Folgore class built for the Italian Regia Marina (Royal Navy) in the 1880s. Armed with three 14 in (356 mm) torpedo tubes and six light guns, she was capable of a top speed of 17 knots (31 km/h; 20 mph). She was built in the mid-1880s, was launched in May 1887, and was completed in February 1888. Saetta spent the first decade of her career serving in the main Italian fleet, where she conducted peacetime training exercises. In 1897, she was withdrawn from front-line service and employed as a gunnery training ship, a role she filled for another decade. The Regia Marina ultimately sold Saetta for scrap in May 1908.

== Design ==
Saetta was 56.7 meters (186 ft) long overall and had a beam of 6.31 m (20 ft 8 in) and an average draft of 2.15 m (7 ft 1 in). She displaced 364 long tons (370 t) normally. Her propulsion system consisted of a pair of horizontal double-expansion steam engines each driving a single screw propeller, with steam supplied by four coal-fired locomotive boilers. Saetta could steam at a speed of 17 knots (31 km/h; 20 mph) from 2,130 indicated horsepower (1,590 kW). She had a crew of between 57 and 70.

The primary armament for Saetta was three 14 in (356 mm) torpedo tubes. For defense against torpedo boats, she was also equipped with two 57 mm (2.24 in) /43 guns and four 37 mm (1.5 in) /25 guns, all mounted singly. The ship carried no armor protection.

== Service history ==
Saetta in 1905

Saetta was built at the Regio Cantiere di Castellammare di Stabia (Royal Dockyard in Castellammare di Stabia). She was launched on 30 May 1887, and was completed on 16 February 1888. That year, she took part in the annual fleet maneuvers, along with five ironclads, a protected cruiser, the torpedo cruisers Tripoli, Goito, and Folgore, and numerous smaller vessels. The maneuvers consisted of close-order drills and a simulated attack on and defense of La Spezia. Later that year, the ship was present during a naval review held for the German Kaiser Wilhelm II during a visit to Italy. In 1892, the Regia Marina used Saetta to conduct experiments with oil-fired boilers.

In 1893, Saetta was laid up in Naples for the year; at the time, the Italian fleet mobilized only a handful of vessels for the annual training maneuvers, preferring to keep the most modern vessels in reserve to reduce maintenance costs. The following year, Saetta was commissioned for two months to take part in the annual fleet maneuvers; she spent the rest of the year in reserve. She took part in the annual fleet maneuvers in the Reserve Division, along with the ironclad Italia and Andrea Doria and the torpedo cruiser Urania. Saetta was stationed in La Spezia in the 1st Maritime Department, along with her sister ship Folgore in 1895, though the latter had been badly damaged in a collision and was decommissioned.

From 1897 to 1900, the ship served as a torpedo training ship. The following year, she was transferred to the gunnery school, where she train gunners for the fleet. In 1902, her gun armament was expanded to increase the types of weapons available for training. These included one 3 in (76 mm) gun, four 57 mm guns, two 47 mm (1.9 in) guns, one 37 mm gun, and one 37 mm revolving Hotchkiss gun. That year, the gunnery school also included the old ironclads Regina Maria Pia and Affondatore; Saetta was used only for target practice at sea. She was still serving in this capacity in 1904–1905, along with the old ironclad Enrico Dandolo. Saetta was ultimately discarded on 14 May 1908 and subsequently broken up for scrap.
