= Italian cruiser Etna =

Protected cruiser of the Italian Royal Navy

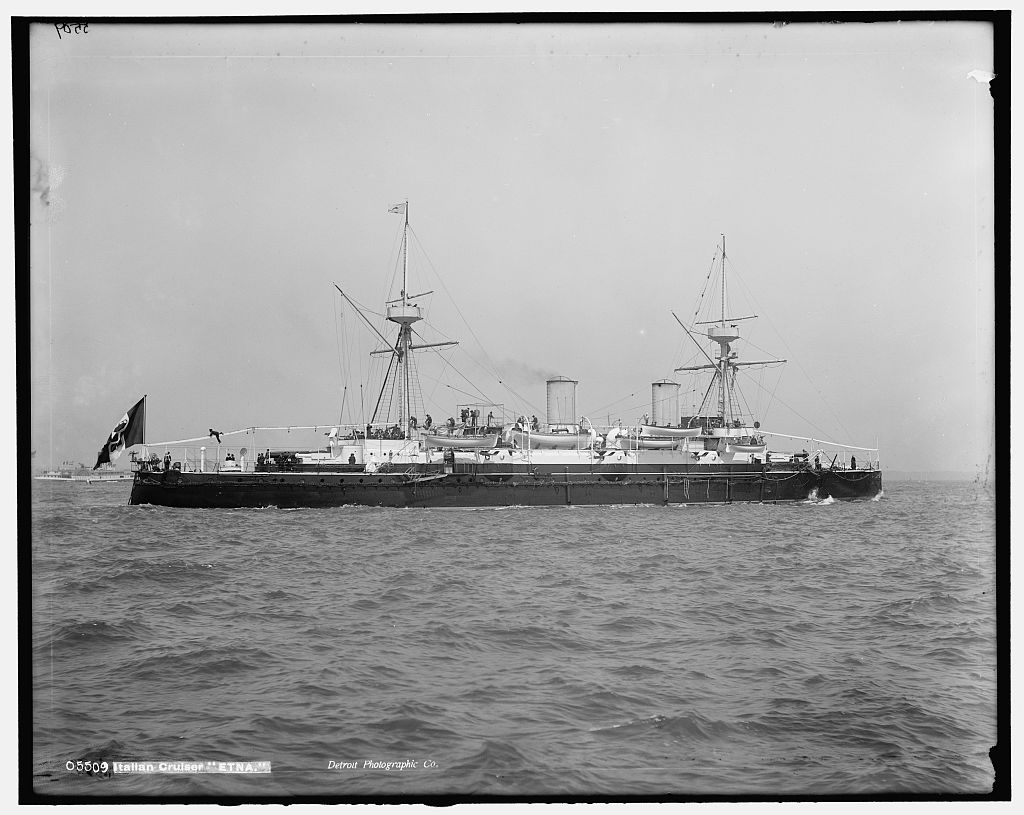
- Etna in the 1890s, probably during her 1893 visit to the United States

History

Italy
- Name: Etna
- Namesake: Mount Etna
- Builder: Regio Cantiere di Castellammare di Stabia
- Laid down: 19 January 1883
- Launched: 26 September 1885
- Commissioned: 3 December 1887
- Fate: Sold for scrap, 15 May 1921

General characteristics
- Class & type: Etna-class cruiser
- Displacement: 3,474 long tons (3,530 t)
- Length: 283 ft 6 in (86.4 m)
- Beam: 42 ft 6 in (13 m)
- Draft: 19 ft (5.8 m)
- Installed power: 7,480 ihp (5,580 kW); 4 × fire-tube boilers
- Propulsion: 2 × compound steam engines; 2 × screw propellers
- Speed: 17 knots (31 km/h; 20 mph)
- Range: 5,000 nautical miles (9,300 km; 5,800 mi) at 10 knots (19 km/h; 12 mph)
- Complement: 12 officers and 296 men
- Armament: 2 × 254 mm (10 in) guns; 6 × 152 mm (6 in) guns; 5 × 57 mm (2.24 in) Hotchkiss guns; 5 × 37 mm (1.5 in) Hotchkiss guns; 4 × 356 mm (14 in) torpedo tubes
- Armor: Deck: 38 mm (1.5 in); Conning tower: 13 mm (0.5 in)

Etna was a protected cruiser of the Italian Regia Marina (Royal Navy) built in the 1880s. She was the lead ship of the Etna class, which included three sister ships. Named for Mount Etna on the island of Sicily, the ship was laid down in January 1883, was launched in September 1885, and was completed in December 1887. She was armed with a main battery of two 254 mm (10 in) and a secondary battery of six 152 mm (6 in) guns, and could steam at a speed of around 17 knots (31 km/h; 20 mph).

Etna frequently cruised abroad throughout her career, including visits to the United States for the World's Columbian Exposition and the Hudson–Fulton Celebration in 1893 and 1909, respectively. She served as a training ship for naval cadets from 1907. She saw action during the Italo-Turkish War of 1911–1912, primarily providing gunfire support to Italian troops ashore in Libya. By the outbreak of World War I in 1914, Etna had been withdrawn from service and was employed as a headquarters ship for the commander of the Italian fleet at Taranto and later for the light forces based at Brindisi. The old cruiser was finally sold for scrap in May 1921.

== Design ==
The four ships of the Etna class were designed in Italy as domestically produced versions of the British-built cruiser Giovanni Bausan. The Italian government secured a manufacturing license from the British firm Armstrong Whitworth, but the design was revised by the Italian naval engineer Carlo Vigna. These cruisers were intended to serve as "battleship destroyers", and represented a temporary embrace of the Jeune École doctrine by the Italian naval command.

Etna was 283 feet 6 inches (86.4 m) between perpendiculars, with a beam of 42 feet 6 inches (13 m). She had a mean draft of 19 feet (5.8 m) and displaced 3,474 long tons (3,530 t). Her crew numbered 12 officers and 296 men. The ship had two horizontal compound steam engines, each driving a single propeller, with steam provided by four double-ended cylindrical boilers. Etna was credited with a top speed of 17.8 knots (33.0 km/h; 20.5 mph) from 7,480 indicated horsepower (5,580 kW). She had a cruising radius of 5,000 nautical miles (9,300 km; 5,800 mi) at a speed of 10 knots (19 km/h; 12 mph).

The main armament of the ships consisted of two Armstrong 254 mm (10 in), 30-caliber breech-loading guns mounted in barbettes fore and aft. She was also equipped with a secondary battery of six 152 mm (6 in), 32-caliber, breech-loading guns that were carried in sponsons along the sides of the ship. For anti-torpedo boat defense, Etna was fitted with five 57 mm (2.24 in) 6-pounder Hotchkiss guns and five 37 mm (1.5 in) 1-pounder Hotchkiss guns. Etna was also armed with four 356 mm (14 in) torpedo tubes. One was mounted in the bow underwater and the other three were above water. She was protected with an armor deck below the waterline with a maximum thickness of 38 mm (1.5 in). The conning tower had 13 mm (0.5 in) worth of armor plating.

From 1905 to 1907 the ship was rebuilt with forecastle and poop decks added and her armament was revised. The heavy 254 mm guns were replaced with two quick-firing (QF) 120 mm (4.7 in) guns and the six original 152 mm guns were replaced by four QF 152 mm guns, two on each side amidships.

== Service history ==
Etna was built by the Castellammare shipyard; her keel was laid down on 19 January 1883 and her completed hull was launched on 26 September 1885. After fitting-out work was finished, she was commissioned into the Italian fleet on 3 December 1887. Etna served in the Squadra Permamente (Permanent Squadron) from her commissioning to 1893 and then served in North and South American waters until the end of 1895. During this period, Etna and the protected cruisers Dogali and Giovanni Bausan represented Italy at the international naval review in New York, held at the start of the World's Columbian Exposition in Chicago in 1893. The Exposition marked the 400th anniversary of Christopher Columbus's arrival in North America. Contingents from France, Germany, Britain, Spain, and several other nations also participated in the celebration. During the visit, she flew the flag of Rear Admiral G. B. Magnaghi,

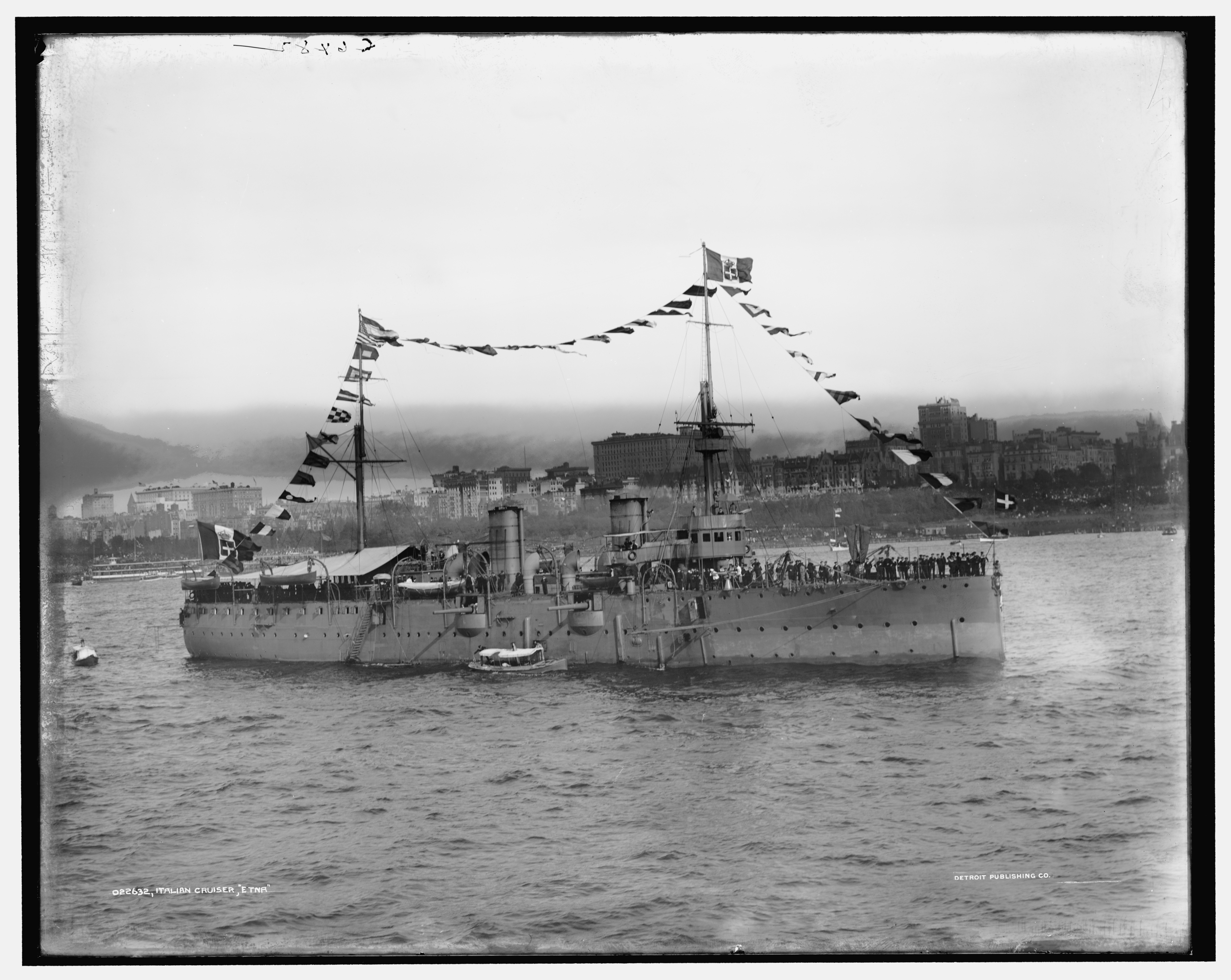
Etna during the Hudson–Fulton Celebration in New York City in September 1909

During the First Italo-Ethiopian War of 1895–1896 she was stationed in the Red Sea. She thereafter supported Italian interests during the Cretan Revolt of 1898. In 1897, Etna was assigned to the cruiser squadron along with Lombardia and Dogali. Later that year, she was reassigned to the 2nd Division of the active fleet in 1897, which also included the ironclad Andrea Doria, the armored cruiser Marco Polo, the protected cruisers Stromboli and Liguria, and the torpedo cruisers Urania, Partenope, and Caprera. The ship was then transferred to the Far East, during which time she made a visit to Sydney, Australia. She returned home in 1902 and was disarmed; she was then commissioned as the flagship of the Superior Torpedo-Boat Command in 1904. In 1907, Etna was converted into a training cruiser for naval cadets. Etna visited the United States in September 1909 for the Hudson–Fulton Celebration in New York City, which also included ships from the German, British, and French fleets, among others, in addition to the hosting US Navy. On this occasion, she was joined by the cruiser Etruria.

Etna saw limited action during the Italo-Turkish War in 1911–1912. At the outbreak of the war in September 1911, she was stationed in eastern Africa, where Italy had colonies in Eritrea and Somaliland. She was joined there by the cruisers Elba, Liguria, Piemonte and Puglia. In December 1911, she was stationed at Tobruk, where she, the battleship Vittorio Emanuele, the cruiser Etruria, and twelve torpedo boats provided gunfire support to the Italians defending the city. She remained there through January 1912 while the bulk of the Italian fleet returned to Italy for repairs. In April, Etna bombarded Ottoman positions outside Benghazi, and in August, she sent men ashore at Zuwarah to relieve the garrison there. On 13 September she shelled Ottoman troops near the ruins of ancient Tripoli. The following month, the Ottomans agreed to surrender, ending the war.

In September 1914, Etna was withdrawn from service as a training ship and used instead as a floating headquarters. Italy entered World War I in May 1915 and the ship was thereafter used as a harbor defense ship before returning to her previous role as a headquarters ship for the commander in chief of the Italian fleet at Taranto. By May 1917, she had been transferred to Brindisi, where she served as the headquarters ship for Rear Admiral Alfredo Acton during the Battle of the Strait of Otranto. The old cruiser was sold for scrapping on 15 May 1921, and was the last surviving ship of her class.
