= Cannon 152/32 Model 1887 =

- Type: Naval gun
- Place of origin: Britain

Service history
- In service: 1887-1910
- Used by: Italy; Uruguay
- Wars: Boxer Rebellion; Italo-Turkish War

Production history
- Designer: Armstrong Whitworth
- Designed: 1886
- Manufacturer: Armstrong Whitworth
- Produced: 1887
- Variants: EOC Pattern M

Specifications
- Mass: 5.6 t (6.2 short tons)
- Barrel length: 4.9 m (16 ft) 32.25 caliber
- Shell: Separate loading 8.8 kg (19 lb) bagged ballistite charge and projectile
- Shell weight: 45.3 kg (100 lb)
- Calibre: 152 mm (6.0 in)
- Breech: Interrupted screw
- Muzzle velocity: 605 m/s (1,980 ft/s)

The Cannon 152/32 Model 1887 was an Italian naval gun designed by the Elswick Ordnance Company and produced by Armstrong Whitworth in the late 1880s for the Italian Navy.

== History ==
The design for the Model 1887 originated in Britain and was based on an export model from Armstrong Whitworth called the Pattern M. The Italians called the gun Cannon 152/32 Model 1887 and it was the first 152 mm in Italian service and saw action in the Boxer Rebellion and Italo-Turkish War.

== Construction ==
The Model 1887 was constructed of an A tube and three layers of reinforcing hoops that extended to the muzzle. There was also an outer jacket, a trunnion and a C hoop with a breech ring. The guns had a three-motion Interrupted screw breech and electric firing similar to early British 6 inch QF guns of the period.

== Naval use ==
The Model 1887 armed Ironclads and Protected cruisers of the Italian and Uruguayan Navy.

=== Ironclads ===
- Ruggiero di Lauria-class - The three ships of this class had a secondary armament of two shielded Model 1887 guns in single mounts at the bow and stern.
- Italian ironclad Lepanto - This ship had a secondary armament of eight Model 1887 guns in single mounts. Two were in shielded mounts at the bow and stern, while another six were mounted in casemates ahead of the superstructure of the ship.

=== Protected cruisers ===
- Etna-class - Three of the four ships of this class Etna, Vesuvio and Stromboli had a secondary armament of six shielded Model 1887 guns, in three sponsons per side, amidships.
- Italian cruiser Dogali - This ship had a primary armament of six shielded Model 1887 guns, in three sponsons per side. In 1908 Dogali was sold to Uruguay and renamed Montevideo.

== Ammunition ==
Ammunition was of separate loading bagged charge and projectile type. The bagged ballistite charge weighed 8.8 kg (19 lb) and projectiles weighed between 45–47 kg (99–104 lb)

The gun was able to fire the following shell types:

- Armor-piercing
- Armor-piercing capped
- Common
- Incendiary
- Shrapnel

== Photo gallery ==
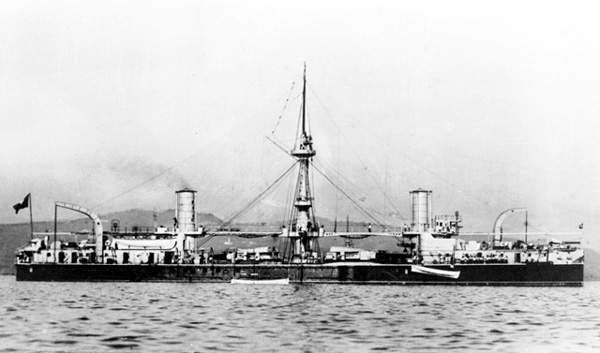
The Italian battleship Ruggiero di Lauria.

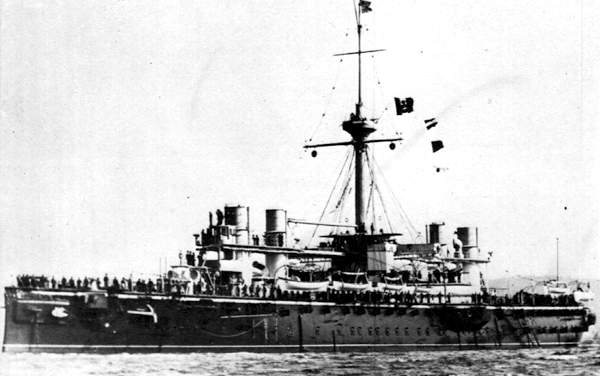
The Italian battleship Lepanto.

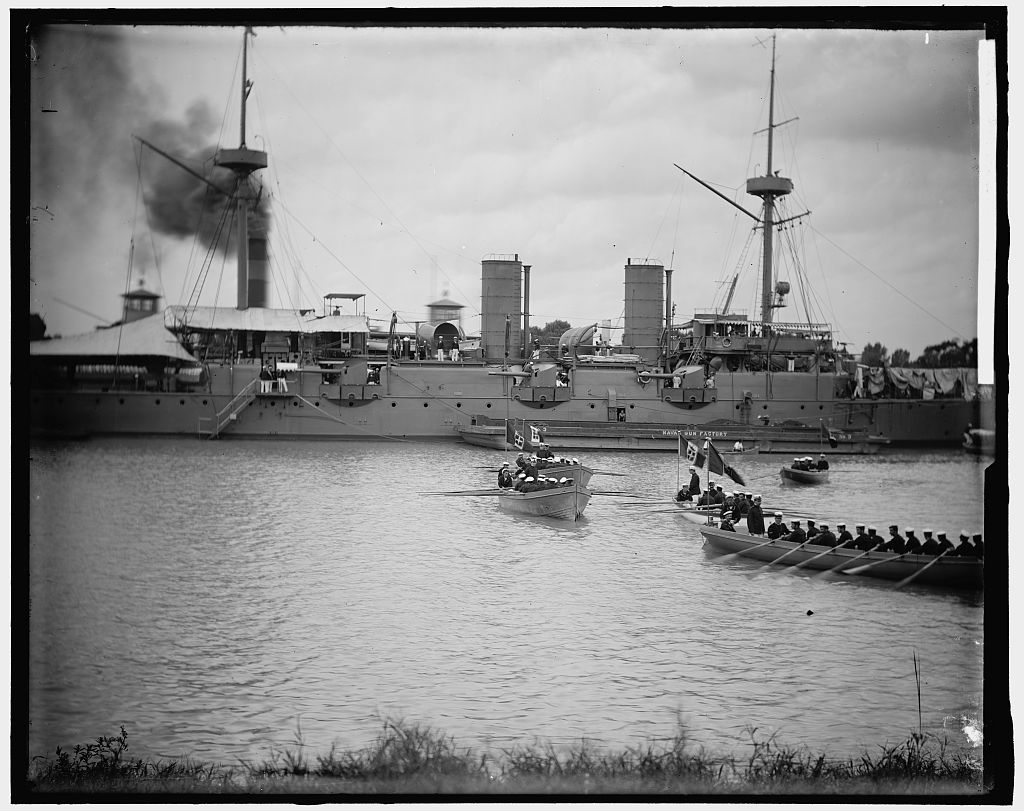
The Italian cruiser Ettore Fieramosca.

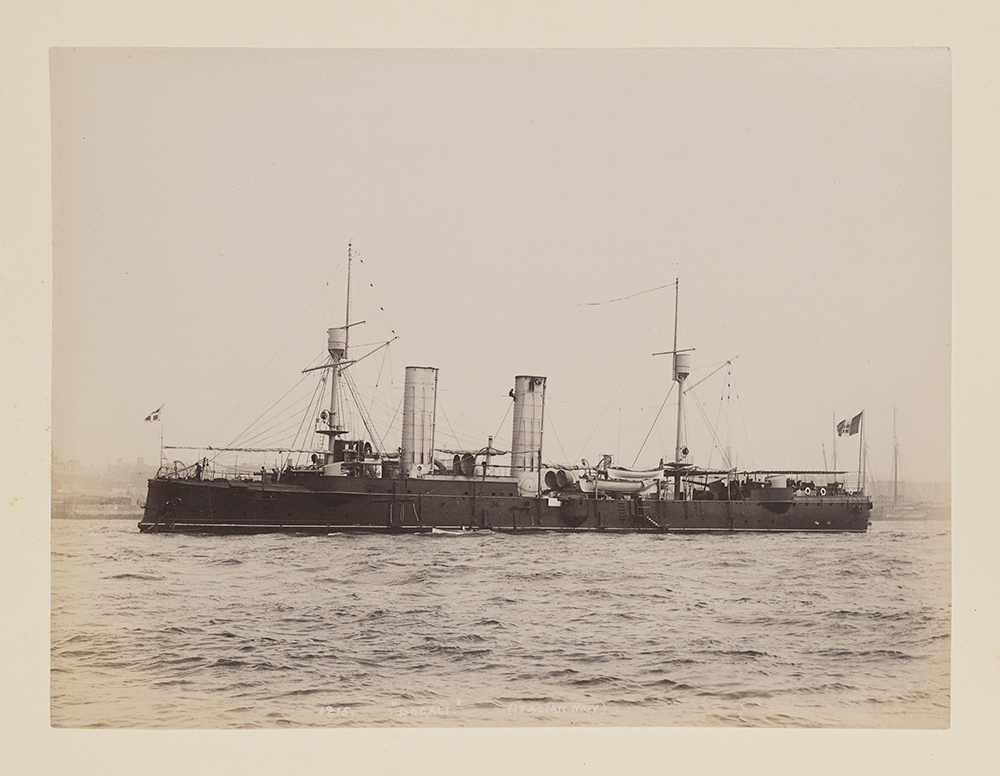
The Italian cruiser Dogali.
