= Italian cruiser Giovanni Bausan =

Protected cruiser of the Italian Royal Navy

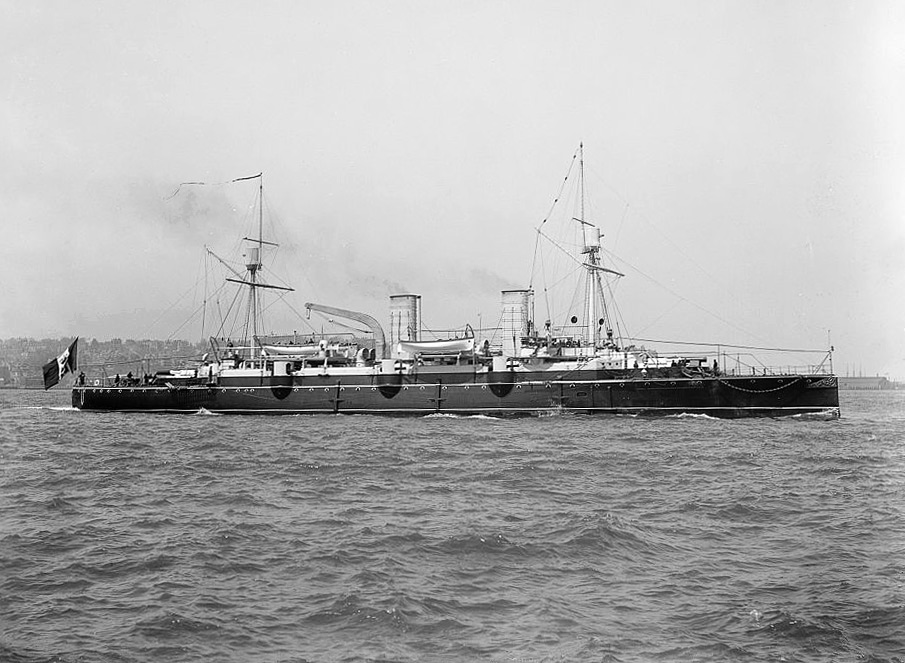
- Giovanni Bausan

Class overview
- Preceded by: None
- Succeeded by: Etna class
- Completed: 1

History

Italy
- Name: Giovanni Bausan
- Namesake: Giovanni Bausan
- Builder: Elswick
- Laid down: 21 August 1882
- Launched: 15 December 1883
- Commissioned: 9 May 1885
- Decommissioned: 15 January 1920
- Fate: Sold for scrap, 1920

General characteristics
- Type: Protected cruiser
- Displacement: 3,082 long tons (3,131 t)
- Length: 89.32 m (293 ft) loa
- Beam: 12.85 m (42 ft 2 in)
- Draft: 5.98 m (19 ft 7 in)
- Installed power: 4 × Scotch marine boilers; 6,470 ihp (4,820 kW)
- Propulsion: 2 × compound steam engines; 2 × screw propellers
- Speed: 17.4 knots (32.2 km/h; 20.0 mph)
- Range: 3,500 nautical miles (6,500 km; 4,000 mi) at 10 knots (19 km/h; 12 mph)
- Complement: 295
- Armament: 2 × BL 10 in (254 mm)/30 guns; 6 × BL 5.9 in (150 mm)/32 guns; 4 × 57 mm (2.24 in) QF 6-pdr guns; 3 × 37 mm (1.5 in) QF 1-pounder; 3 × 14 in (356 mm) torpedo tubes
- Armor: Deck: 0.75–1.5-inch (19–38 mm)

Giovanni Bausan was a protected cruiser of the Italian Regia Marina (Royal Navy) that was designed and built by Sir W G Armstrong Mitchell & Co.'s Elswick Works in England in the mid-1880s. The finished ship entered service in May 1885. She was the first ship of this type to be built for the Italian fleet, and she provided the basis for subsequent designs built in Italy, including the Etna class. Giovanni Bausan was intended to serve as a "battleship destroyer", and was armed with a main battery of two 10-inch (254 mm) guns to give her the ability to defeat heavy armor, but design flaws rendered her unfit for this role.

Giovanni Bausan frequently served abroad. She participated in the conquest of Eritrea in 1887–1888 as the flagship of the Italian squadron during the campaign. She took part in the Venezuelan crisis of 1902–1903 alongside British and German warships. During the Italo-Turkish War of 1911–1912, she provided gunfire support to Italian troops ashore in North Africa. By the outbreak of the First World War, Giovanni Bausan had been relegated to secondary duties, first as a distilling ship, and later as a depot ship for seaplanes. The ship was disarmed during the conflict and ultimately was sold to ship-breakers in March 1920.

== Design ==
The design of Giovanni Bausan was based on that of Elswick's earlier Esmeralda, built for Chile and designed by George Rendel, and was the first modern protected cruiser constructed for the Italian Navy. The new ship was ordered in 1882 by Guglielmo Acton, then the Minister for the Navy, and was named for Giovanni Bausan, a Neapolitan naval commander who fought in the French Revolutionary Wars and the Napoleonic Wars. Referred to by some as a torpedo ram, she was one of the first ships of her type. Giovanni Bausan was intended for use as a "battleship destroyer", but the low rate of fire of her guns and her lack of steadiness as a gun platform made her ineffective in this role. She nevertheless represented a temporary embrace of the theories of the Jeune École doctrine espoused by French naval architects and strategists.

=== General characteristics and machinery ===
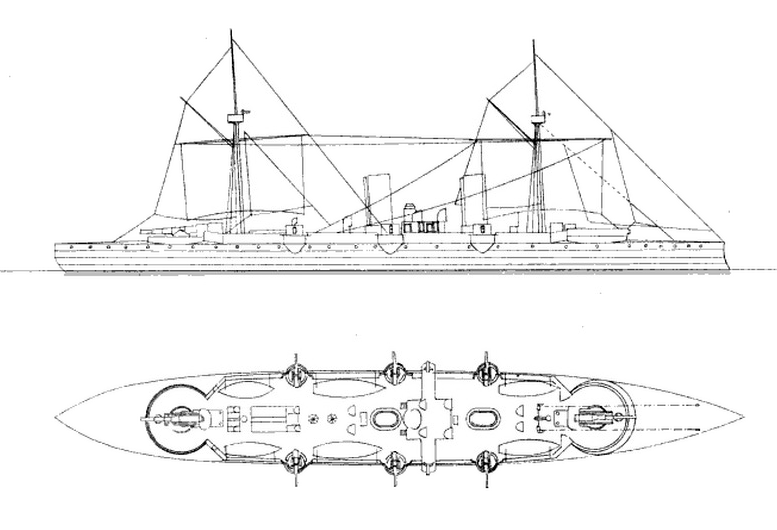
Plan and profile drawing of Giovanni Bausan

Giovanni Bausan was 84.12 meters (276 ft) long between perpendiculars and 89.32 m (293 ft) long overall. She had a beam of 12.85 m (42 ft 2 in) and a draft of 5.98 m (19 ft 7 in). The ship displaced 3,082 long tons (3,131 t). Giovanni Bausan was steel-hulled, and had a crew of 295 officers and enlisted men, though later in her career this was reduced to 256. The four Etna-class cruisers were half-sisters of Giovanni Bausan, built to a modified, slightly enlarged design. She was equipped with a ram bow and initially fitted with rigging as a schooner.

Giovanni Bausan was powered by two compound-expansion steam engines that each drove a screw propeller. Steam was provided by four cylindrical Scotch boilers, which were trunked into two funnels on the centerline. On trials, the engines produced 6,470 indicated horsepower (4,820 kW) for a top speed of 17.4 knots (32.2 km/h; 20.0 mph). At a cruising speed of 10 knots (19 km/h; 12 mph), the ship could steam for 5,000 nautical miles (9,300 km; 5,800 mi). The schooner rig was intended to provide an auxiliary method of propulsion if the ship's engines broke down; by the time Giovanni Bausan entered service in the mid-1880s, marine steam engines had become reliable enough that auxiliary sails were no longer necessary, and hers were later removed.

=== Armament and armor ===
Armament was heavy for her size, with the main battery consisting of a pair of 10-inch (254 mm) 30-caliber breech-loading (BL) guns mounted in individual barbettes fore and aft, capable of training up to 30 degrees abaft of the beam. These were Pattern G models manufactured by Elswick Ordnance Company. Six BL 5.9-inch (150 mm), 32-caliber secondary guns were mounted in sponsons, three on a side, which comprised the secondary battery. Close-range defense against torpedo boats was provided by a tertiary battery of four quick-firing (QF) 6-pounder 57 mm (2.24 in) 40-caliber guns and three QF 1-pounder 37 mm (1.5 in) guns. She was also equipped with three 14-inch (356 mm) torpedo tubes, one on each broadside above water and one submerged tube in the bow.

She was fitted with an armored deck that ran from stem to stern. It was 1.5 inches (38 mm) in thickness over the boilers and engines and reduced in thickness to 0.75 inches (19 mm) fore and aft. The ship also had an "armor" belt of cork at her waterline, which was intended to swell through water absorption after being hit. This proved to be unsuccessful as hits would result in the destruction of the cork. Giovanni Bausan's conning tower was protected with armor plating 2 inches (51 mm) thick and the breeches of her main guns were also protected by 2 inches of armor.

== Service history ==
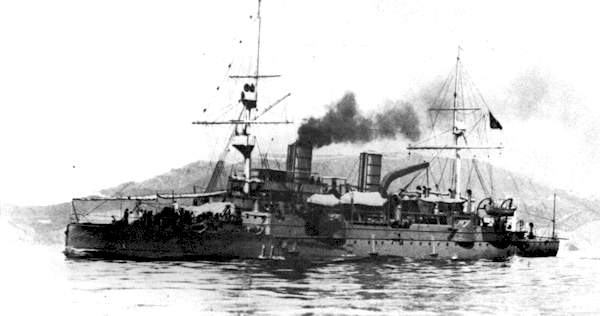
Giovanni Bausan some time before 1913

Giovanni Bausan was laid down at the Armstrong Whitworth shipyard in Elswick in England on 21 August 1882. Her completed hull was launched on 15 December 1883. After her commissioning on 9 May 1885, she departed from England on 21 May to join the Squada Permamente (Permanent Squadron), and in 1887–1888 she participated in the conquest of Eritrea, where she acted as the flagship of the Italian Red Sea Squadron. Following the conclusion of the Eritrean campaign, Giovanni Bausan returned to Italy. In 1888, she took part in the annual fleet maneuvers, along with four ironclads, three other protected cruisers, four torpedo cruisers, and numerous smaller vessels. The maneuvers consisted of close-order drills and a simulated attack on and defense of La Spezia. Later that year, the ship was present during a naval review held for the German Kaiser Wilhelm II during a visit to Italy. On 5 July 1889, she collided with the torpedo cruiser Folgore, badly damaging her. Giovanni Bausan thereafter spent much of her time in service overseas, particularly in the Americas. During this service, she made a port visit to New York City in 1892, during which she was the first foreign warship to be repaired at the Brooklyn Navy Yard in 15 years.

In 1896, she took part in the annual summer maneuvers in July as part of the Second Division of the Active Squadron, which also included the ironclads Francesco Morosini and Andrea Doria and the torpedo cruiser Tripoli. In 1897, she became part of the International Squadron, a multinational force made up of ships of the Austro-Hungarian Navy, French Navy, Imperial German Navy, Regia Marina, Imperial Russian Navy, and British Royal Navy that intervened in the 1897–1898 Greek Christian uprising against the Ottoman Empire′s rule in Crete. In 1899, Giovanni Bausan had her 5.9-inch guns replaced by modern QF 6-inch (152 mm) guns.

In late 1902, she was sent to Venezuelan waters during the Venezuelan crisis of 1902–1903, when an international force of British, German, and Italian warships blockaded Venezuela over the country's refusal to pay foreign debts. The Italian contingent also included the protected cruiser Elba and the armored cruiser Carlo Alberto. The following year, she and the protected cruisers Etna and Dogali represented Italy at the international naval review in New York, held at the start of the World's Columbian Exposition in Chicago. The Exposition marked the 400th anniversary of Christopher Columbus's arrival in North America. Contingents from France, Germany, Britain, Spain, and several other nations also participated in the celebration. In 1904, Giovanni Bausan returned to Italy, where she was assigned to the Reserve Division, and two of her 6-inch guns were removed, though she was slated to be replaced by the new armored cruiser Francesco Ferruccio, when she entered service in September 1905.

From 1905, Giovanni Bausan served as a training ship for stokers and mechanics until the outbreak of the Italo-Turkish War in 1912. Returning to active duty as Flagship Cyrenaica, she served in the shore bombardment role until the end of the war, when she was again returned to second-line service as a distilling ship. Fitted with four distillers and capable of producing 200 tons of fresh water every 24 hours, she was operating in this role at the start of the First World War. Because of the pressing need for artillery for service with the army, Giovanni Bausan was partially disarmed in 1915, losing her 10-inch guns and two of the 6-inch pieces. Later in the war, the rest of her armament was removed. She was reassigned for service as a seaplane depot ship at Brindisi. Decommissioned in 1919, she was sold for scrap in March 1920 and broken up soon after.
