= Austro-Italian ironclad arms race =

19th Century naval arms race

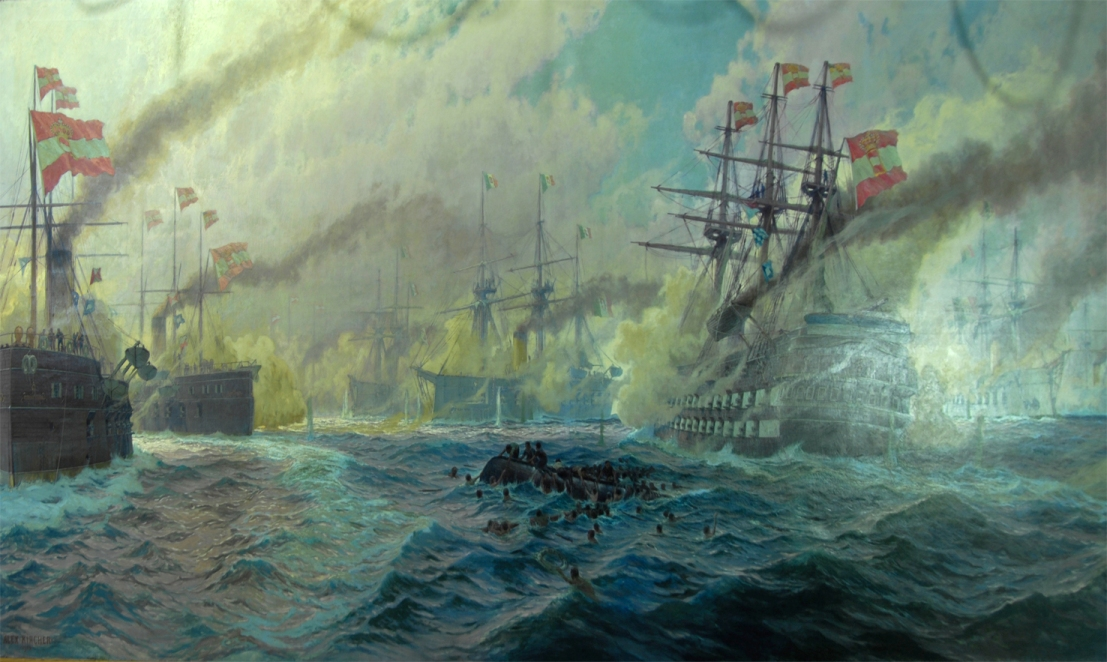
The Battle of Lissa on 20 July 1866 by Alexander Kircher. The Battle of Lissa served as the climax of the Austro-Italian ironclad arms race and was the first naval engagement between multiple armored warships in history.

A naval arms race between the Austrian Empire and Italy began in the 1860s when both ordered a series of ironclad warships, steam-propelled vessels protected by iron or steel armor plates and far more powerful than all-wood ships of the line. These ships were constructed to establish control over the Adriatic Sea in the event of a conflict between the two countries.

The unification of much of Italy in this time period resulted in the amalgamation of the various navies of the former Italian states into the Regia Marina (Royal Navy). The Sardinian component included two Formidabile-class ironclads, ordered from France in 1860, which became Italy's first broadside ironclads. The country quickly began a substantial construction program to bolster the Regia Marina, as the Italians believed that a strong navy would play a crucial role in making the recently unified kingdom a great power.

These actions captured the attention of the Austrian Empire, which viewed Italy with great suspicion and worry, as irredentist claims by Italian nationalists were directed at key Austrian territories such as Venice, Trentino, and Trieste. In response to the growing strength of Sardinia—soon to be Italy—the Imperial Austrian Navy ordered two Drache-class ironclads in 1860. This began a naval arms race between Austria and Italy, centered around the construction and acquisition of ironclads. This continued for the next six years, and by the time the war broke out between the two in 1866, Austria possessed seven ironclads to Italy's twelve.

While Italy emerged on the winning side of the war and acquired the Kingdom of Lombardy–Venetia under the terms of the Treaty of Vienna, the Regia Marina was decisively defeated at the Battle of Lissa by the much smaller Imperial Austrian Navy. Their poor performance led to a period of neglect with reduced naval budgets and a halt to new ship construction; Italy would not have another ironclad laid down until 1873.

Meanwhile, Austria reformed itself into the Austro-Hungarian Empire in 1867 after losing the Seven Weeks War to Prussia. In the years following the Battle of Lissa, Wilhelm von Tegetthoff would oversee the construction of three additional ironclads and the rebuilding of a fourth. After Tegetthoff's death in 1871, the Austro-Hungarian Navy entered its own period of neglect, with just five additional ironclads being constructed in the ensuing thirteen years. Both navies engaged in further construction projects throughout the 1870s and early 1880s, but the arms race ended in the 1880s due to the signing of the Triple Alliance between Italy, Austria-Hungary, and Germany in 1882 and the introduction of new technologies that led to the development of pre-dreadnought battleships. Despite their alliance, however, Italy and Austria-Hungary would engage in a second naval arms race centered around the construction of battleships at the turn of the century. This arms race would continue until the beginning of World War I.

== Background ==
The unification of Italy between 1829 and 1870

=== Establishment of the Regia Marina ===
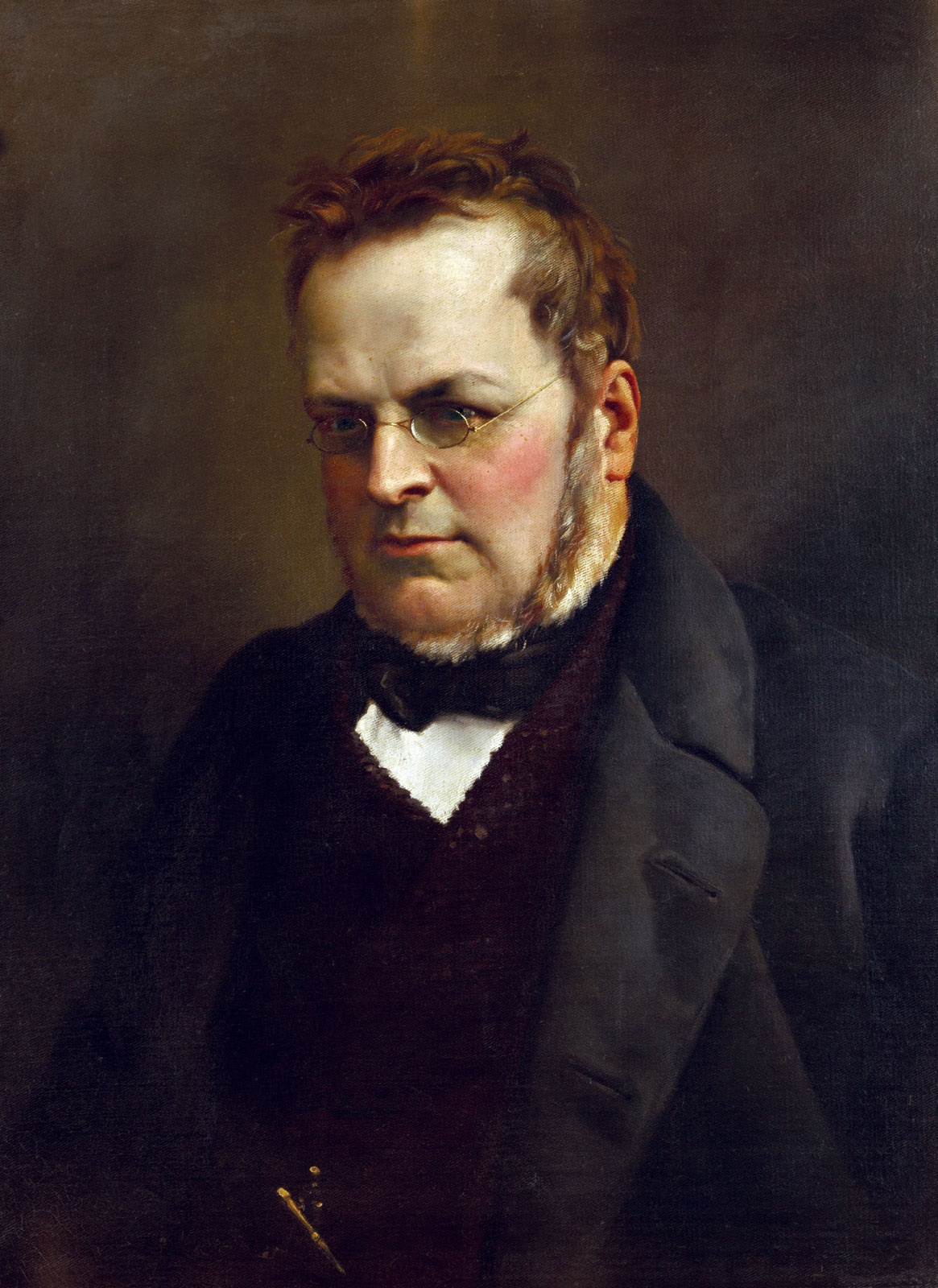
Camillo Benso, Count of Cavour, the first Prime Minister of Italy. Cavour was instrumental in the establishment of the Regia Marina and the initiation of Italy's ironclad program.

In March 1860, Camillo Benso, Count of Cavour became the Kingdom of Sardinia's naval minister. He assumed this role at a time when Sardinia was rapidly expanding into Northern and Central Italy. This expansion likewise resulted in the growth of the kingdom's navy. In April, Cavour oversaw the incorporation of Tuscany's small fleet into the Royal Sardinian Navy. Immediately after the Tuscan fleet had been integrated into the Sardinian navy, Cavour placed an order with the Société Nouvelle des Forges et Chantiers de la Méditerranée to construct two armored warships in Toulon. These two ships would become the Formidabile class, the first ironclads to serve in the Italian peninsula. While foreign powers such as Austria watched the growth of Sardinia and the expansion of its army closely, the consolidation of the Sardinian Navy after the incorporation of multiple states across the Italian peninsula received far less attention. This allowed Cavour to continue his work incorporating the various fleets Sardinia inherited as more and more Italian states joined the growing kingdom.

Garibaldi's conquest of the Kingdom of Two Sicilies marked the beginning of the Sardinian Navy's transformation into the Italian Regia Marina. When the Italian revolutionary landed in Sicily in May 1860, only two steamships were at the disposal of his thousand volunteers. By the time Garibaldi had conquered the island, he had more than 12 steam ships of various types which would later assist in transporting his army across the Strait of Messina to Southern Italy. These numbers were bolstered by the desertion of most of the Neapolitan Navy in July 1860 to Garibaldi's cause. Following Garibaldi's conquest of Naples in September, the remainder of the Neapolitan Navy was handed over to Carlo Pellion di Persano for incorporation into the Sardinia Navy.

The rest of Southern Italy fell in short order and in March 1861, the Kingdom of Italy was proclaimed. By this time, the vast majority of the former navies of the various Italian states had been brought into the Sardinian Navy. Two weeks after the establishment of the Kingdom of Italy, the Italian Regia Marina was created as a single unified naval force for the newly formed kingdom. Cavour immediately asked the Italian Chamber of Deputies for an unprecedented 20,000,000-lire budget to expand the Regia Marina beyond its newly acquired ships. The funds would also be used to construct additional ironclads as well as establish an Italian naval base at Ancona on the Adriatic Sea. The stage was thus set for the Italian ironclad program.

=== Development of the Imperial Austrian Navy: 1854–1860 ===
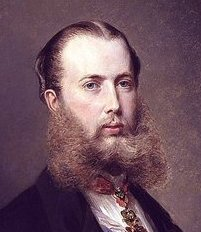
Archduke Ferdinand Maximilian of Austria served as Commander-in-Chief of the Imperial Austrian Navy at the onset of the ironclad arms race.

Even before the unification of Italy, the Imperial Austrian Navy had been undergoing its own expansion ever since the promotion of Archduke Ferdinand Maximilian of Austria (the future Emperor Maximilian I of Mexico) to the office of Kontreadmiral (Rear Admiral) and to the post of Oberkommandant der Marine (Commander-in-Chief of the Navy) in September 1854. At the age of 22, Ferdinand Max became the youngest Oberkommandant in the history of the Imperial Austrian Navy, being a year younger than when Archduke Friedrich of Austria assumed command of the navy ten years earlier. Despite his age and his lack of experience in battle or command on the high seas, Ferdinand Max was described by naval historian Lawrence Sondhaus as "the most gifted leader the navy had ever had, or ever would have." Ferdinand Max worked hard to separate the Imperial Austrian Navy from its dependence upon the Imperial Austrian Army, which had nominal control over its affairs. As the younger brother to Franz Joseph I, Ferdinand Max was given great freedom by the Emperor to manage the navy as he saw fit, especially with respect to the construction and acquisition of new warships.

Ferdinand Max immediately went to work expanding the Imperial Austrian Navy. Fears of over-dependence upon foreign shipyards to supply Austrian warships enabled him to convince his brother to authorize the construction of a new drydock at Pola, and the expansion of existing shipyards in Trieste. Furthermore, Ferdinand Max initiated an ambitious construction program in the ports of Pola, Trieste, and Venice, the largest the Adriatic had seen since the Napoleonic Wars. By 1855, a screw-powered ship-of-the-line was under construction in Pola after failed bids with British and American shipbuilding firms, while two screw-frigates and two screw-corvettes were being built in Trieste and Venice respectively.

By the spring of 1855, the Imperial Austrian Navy consisted of four frigates, four corvettes, and two paddle steamers in active service in the Mediterranean Sea. This would be the largest Austrian fleet since before the War of Austrian Succession over 100 years prior. Despite these efforts however, the Imperial Austrian Navy was still considerably smaller than its French, British, or Italian counterparts. Indeed, the Imperial Austrian Navy was still attempting to catch up to the technological developments which had emerged during the first half of the 19th century with respect to steam power, when the emergence of the French iron-plated floating battery Dévastation gained international attention following its use during the Crimean War in October 1855. Dévastation would signal the beginning of the emergence of ironclad warships over the course of the next decade.

Following Austria's defeat during the Second War of Italian Independence, Ferdinand Max proposed an even larger naval construction program. This fleet would be large enough not only to show the Austrian flag around the world, but also to protect its merchant marine as well as thwart any Adriatic ambitions from the growing Kingdom of Italy. However, constitutional reforms in Austria after the military defeat, as well as the recent introduction of ironclads into the navies of the world, would make the proposal more expensive than initially intended. While the Archduke had previously had free rein over naval affairs, and had enjoyed an unprecedented funds to complete his various projects, Austria's financial difficulties in the immediate aftermath of the war stalled his plans. However the Italian ironclad program between 1860 and 1861, coupled with Austrian fears of an Italian invasion or seaborne landing directed against Venice, Trieste, Istria, and the Dalmatian Coast, demanded an Austrian naval response.

== Onset of the Austro-Italian ironclad arms race ==
=== Austrian reaction to the unification of Italy ===
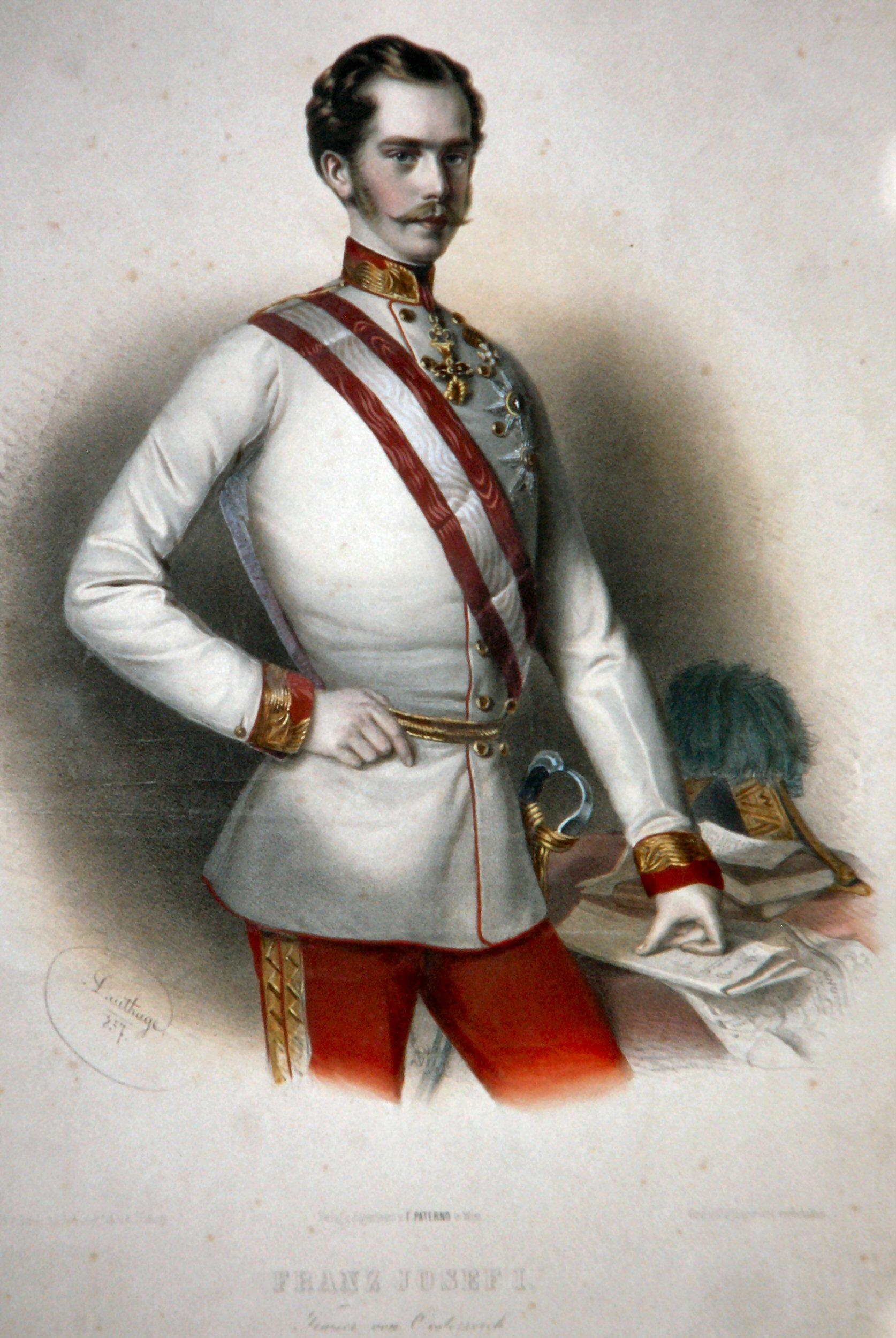
Franz Joseph I, Emperor of Austria

When Giuseppe Garibaldi's conquest of the Kingdom of the Two Sicilies began in May 1860, the Austrian Empire responded by recalling its small fleet stationed in the Levant under the command of Fregattenkapitän (Captain) Wilhelm von Tegetthoff. Kontreadmiral (Rear Admiral) Bernhard von Wüllerstorf-Urbair then deployed the Imperial Austrian Navy to the waters off of Naples in order to prevent Garibaldi from attacking the city by sea. However, the defection of the Neapolitan Navy and Garibaldi's rapid advance up the Italian Peninsula after making landfall at Calabria rendered this fleet useless. The Austrian fleet was instead tasked with transporting King Francis II from Naples to Gaeta.

The collapse of the Kingdom of the Two Sicilies in just a matter of months sparked a diplomatic and military crisis in Vienna. While Garibaldi finished his conquests, the Sardinian Army invaded the Papal States and the growing Sardinian Navy entered the Adriatic to blockade the port of Ancona. The Austrian Empire viewed Sardinian warships in the Adriatic as an overtly hostile act, and fears of Garibaldi continuing his military campaigns by attempting a landing in Istria or the Dalmatian Coast resulted in even greater alarm. The Austrian government knew these lands were deemed Italia irredenta (Unredeemed Italy) by revolutionaries such as Garibaldi, due to their historical ties with the former Venetian Republic. To make matters worse, Garibaldi had several hundred Hungarian volunteers in the ranks of his army. Vienna calculated that should a landing along the Austrian coastline by Garibaldi be successful, the whole southern and eastern portions of the country could potentially erupt into revolution, much like the revolutions in 1848 which nearly toppled the Austrian Empire altogether.

These concerns were so great that in September 1860, Emperor Franz Joseph I issued an order to the Imperial Austrian Navy which stipulated that all Sardinian ships of any kind were to be barred entry into any Austrian-controlled port. Franz Joseph also ordered that any vessel identified as carrying Garibaldi or his men were to be "treated as pirates, regardless of their flag". While tensions eased slightly following the Sardinian Navy's withdrawal from Ancona in October after the city fell to Sardinian troops on land, Austrian fears of a potential naval invasion continued. France and the United Kingdom were locked in their own naval arms race at the time, which meant the only support the British were able to provide were firm commitments against an Italian attack on Istria or Dalmatia. This was sufficient to prevent the Sardinian government from sanctioning any expeditions directed at the two regions, and fears within Vienna of an Italian naval invasion evaporated by 1861. Nevertheless, the Austrian Empire refused to recognize the proclamation of the Kingdom of Italy on 17 March 1861, nor King Victor Emmanuel II's claim to be the "King of Italy", a throne which had been left vacant since Napoleon I's abdication of the title in 1814.

=== The Regia Marina orders its first ironclads ===
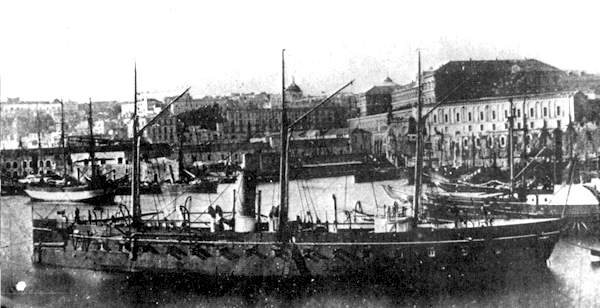
The Formidabile-class ironclad Terribile. The ships of this class were the first ironclads of the Italian Regia Marina and their construction marked the beginning of the Austro-Italian naval arms race.

The Italian ironclad program began before there even was a "Kingdom of Italy". The first two ironclad warships in the Italian Peninsula, the Formidabile-class ironclads Formidabile and Terribile, were ordered by Cavour in the spring of 1860, before Garibaldi had even landed in Sicily. The ships had originally been intended to serve as armored floating batteries, and their designs were thus based on the France's Dévastation-class ironclad floating battery which had earned recognition at the Battle of Kinburn during the Crimean War. Despite these plans, the rapid expansion of the Kingdom of Sardinia and the subsequent unification of Italy resulted in the ships being converted into sea-going broadside ironclads. This change signaled the direction of Italian foreign and naval policy, as the ships were aimed at defeating the Imperial Austrian Navy in open combat. Indeed, even after the establishment of a single Kingdom of Italy in 1861, many Italians believed the Risorgimento had not yet been complete, as the Austrian Empire still possessed several Italian-speaking territories, most notably Venice.

Terribile would be the first Italian ironclad to be commissioned into the Regia Marina, joining the fleet in September 1861. She was soon followed by her sister ship Formidabile, which was commissioned in May 1862, the same month that Austria's first ironclad, Salamander, would be commissioned into the Imperial Austrian Navy.

=== The Imperial Austrian Navy responds ===
The Austrian ironclad Drache, lead ship of her class. She and her sister ship Salamander were Austria's first ironclad warships and were intended to counter Italy's own ironclad program.

Austria could not ignore the threat the Regia Marina's naval expansion program posed to the Austrian coastline. In response to the assembly of the Italian Formidabile class, Archduke Ferdinand Max ordered the construction of the Drache-class ironclads at the end of 1860. Constructed by a Trieste-based shipbuilding firm, these would be the first ironclad warships of the Imperial Austrian Navy. Austria had considered constructing ironclads before this, but the excessive cost of British shipbuilding offers in December 1858 led to the offers being rejected by Kontreadmiral (Rear Admiral) Ludwig von Fautz. However, Italy's ironclad program led to these cost concerns being rendered irrelevant.

The financial, logistical, and political hurdles Ferdinand Max had to overcome in order to construct the Drache class were enormous. Austria had recently lost Eugène Sandfort, the French-born shipbuilding director for the Imperial Austrian Navy, who had resigned his post during the Second War of Italian Independence. Usually, the Austrian Navy would place an order for the vessels with a foreign shipyard, but the falling value of the florin in the years immediately after the war meant that Ferdinand Max could not follow Cavour's lead and seek to construct the ships he needed in another country. Ferdinand Max was thus forced to construct Austria's first ironclads using resources the Austrian Empire had on hand. The Navale Adriatico shipyard in Trieste was owned by the Austrian government at the time, while additional yards in the Austrian Littoral both had experience building engines which would be large enough to theoretically power the ironclads Ferdinand Max wished to construct. Inner Austria likewise possessed iron ore mines and ironworks necessary to make the armor for the warships. Furthermore, the Imperial Austrian Navy could also count on its own group of engineers to design the ships, as Ferdinand Max had dispatched a group of naval cadets, led by Josef von Romako, to study naval architecture in Copenhagen shortly before the war.

Ferdinand Max ordered the ships and their engines in December 1860 from domestic shipyards. This work was done before any formal approval for the project could be granted by Franz Joseph I, but in February 1861 the Emperor allowed the construction to proceed. Ten days later, the Emperor also privatized the Navale Adriatico shipyard, in order to increase private sector interest in Austria's emerging ironclad program.

Securing the armor contracts for the ships would be more difficult. Ferdinand Max had placed an order for the armor with domestic ironworks, but the sheer quantity of iron required and the timescale was beyond the industry's capacity. As a result, the Archduke was forced to look to France for the iron plating for his new warships. His overtures to French firms had to be kept secret however due to a ban on armor exports issued by French Emperor Napoleon III, who wished to preserve French resources for France's own ironclad projects. The money to pay for the French-built armor which would be used on the Drache-class ships were therefore supplied via Austrian agents operating out of Geneva. After being sent to Marseille for shipping, the armor was placed aboard merchant ships flying the flags of neither France or Austria. The entire operation was kept so secret that not even the captains of the ships carrying the plates knew where they would be delivering their cargo until just before they set sail. Despite the level of secrecy employed, French officials discovered the operation shortly before the first vessel, the Mecklenburg merchant ship Grossfürstin Katharina, was to set sail from Marseille. They seized the ship and confiscated its cargo, initially believing the vessel was smuggling arms to Garibaldi's forces in Italy. After the Austrian government used diplomatic backchannels to negotiate with French authorities, the cargo was released and the ships were allowed to leave Marseille without any further incidents.

When the first Drache-class ironclad, Salamander, was commissioned into the Imperial Austrian Navy in May 1862, she was the most expensive warship ever constructed for the Imperial Austrian Navy. She and her sister ship Drache cost 2,300,000 Florins each, a staggering amount of money at the time, and over six times the cost of previous Austrian warships. Despite the expensive nature of the ships involved, and before either the Austrians or Italians had commissioned a single ship into their respective navies, plans were already being made in both countries to develop more ironclad warships, each to counter the naval strength of the other.

== Escalation of the arms race ==
Italian and Austrian Ironclad warship construction, 1860–1865
Year	Ship(s)	Year	Ship(s)
1860 (Kingdom of Sardinia)	Formidabile; Terribile	1862 (Kingdom of Italy)	Regina Maria Pia; San Martino; Castelfidardo; Ancona
1861 (Kingdom of Sardinia)	Principe di Carignano	1863 (Kingdom of Italy)	Conte Verde; Roma; Venezia; Affondatore
1861 (Kingdom of Italy)	Messina; Re d'Italia; Re di Portogallo	1863 (Austrian Empire)	Erzherzog Ferdinand Max; Habsburg
1861 (Austrian Empire)	Drache; Salamander; Kaiser Max; Prinz Eugen; Don Juan d'Austria	1865 (Kingdom of Italy)	Principe Amedeo; Palestro
Key: Kingdom of Sardinia (1860–1861) Kingdom of Italy (1861–1866) Austrian Empire
Note that the dates refer to when ships were laid down.

=== Austrian and Italian ironclad orders in 1861 ===
In April 1861, the Archduke drew up his first plans for a modernized and armored Imperial Austrian Navy. In his submission to Emperor Franz Joseph I, he argued that nearly all of Austria's diplomatic and military challenges could be addressed by engaging in a large ironclad construction program. His proposal outlined a battle fleet of nine armored ironclads, with seven more warships to join the two Drache-class ships in the autumn of 1863. Ferdinand Max wrote that the recent technological revolution in naval affairs which had been caused by the emergence of ironclads provided for a clean slate in which the Imperial Austrian Navy could develop newer warships on the same scale and pace as the other Great Powers of Europe, as older wooden ships of any type or nationality had been rendered obsolete by the new armor-plated ships.

Ferdinand Max was also sure to include the diplomatic benefits of engaging in an ambitious ironclad construction program. He argued that constructing a further seven ironclads by 1863 would allow the Imperial Austrian Navy to possess a fleet one-third the size of the French Navy, considered one of the largest and strongest in the world. This new fleet would thus increase the value of any military alliance Austria were to make with the other European powers, and potentially end the diplomatic isolation that the Empire had been facing since the Crimean War. Furthermore, the need for Austria to construct these warships was urgent in the eyes of Ferdinand Max, as the Italian government was devoting substantial amounts of money to building ironclads for the Regia Marina.

While Ferdinand Max was laying out plans for Austria's ironclad program, the Regia Marina was already executing its own program. Following up on the construction of the Formidabile class with another order for more warships, Cavour met with New York shipbuilder William H. Webb in Turin in late 1860, and concluded a deal was made for his shipyard to construct two armored frigates, which would eventually become the Re d'Italia-class ironclads Re d'Italia and Re di Portogallo. Cavour's agreement with Webb was made a state secret, and it would not be until after his death in June 1861 that the contracts for the ships were signed by General Luigi Menabrea, who succeeded Cavour as head of the Regia Marina. Re d'Italia was the first ship of the class to be laid down in New York City in November 1861 and her sister ship Re di Portogallo followed in December.

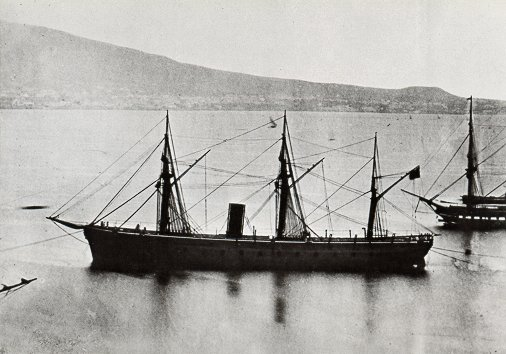
A Re d'Italia-class ironclad, Italy's second class of ironclad warships and the first to be originally designed as such

News of the Italian project, which became public in August 1861, sparked panic in Vienna. Just four months earlier, the Austrian Reichsrat had rejected Ferdinand Max's naval expansion program, only allocating the Archduke 6,000,000 Florins to run the Imperial Austrian Navy in 1862. The following month, Ferdinand Max briefed the Austrian Council of Ministers in Vienna on the Italian naval expansion. He told the council the Imperial Austrian Navy needed a budget of 15,100,000 Florins for the year 1862, over twice what had been allocated earlier that year. Ferdinand Max argued that the additional funds were needed to construct three more ironclads in short order, lest Austria fall behind its Italian neighbor. The Archduke's modified ironclad program would give the Austrian Empire a navy he believed would be capable of defeating the Regia Marina by the summer of 1862. Despite objections from the Austrian Finance, State, and Foreign Ministries, Emperor Franz Joseph I approved the program in October.

Construction of Austria's second class of ironclads thus began in October 1861 by Stabilimento Tecnico Triestino. Again designed by Romako, the Kaiser Max-class ironclads Kaiser Max, Prinz Eugen, and Don Juan d'Austria were all intended to be improvements over the previous Drache class. Each ship was designed by Romako to be larger with more powerful engines and carry a larger gun battery than their predecessors. Having encountered political opposition from the Austrian Reichsrat earlier in the year when he requested for additional funds, Ferdinand Max attempted to grow political support for the construction of future ironclads by purchasing some of the armor plating from a rolling mill in Celje owned by Reichsrat member Johann von Putzer. The Henckel von Donnersmarck Zeltweg works were likewise contracted to deliver armor plates for the ironclads, as were the same French firms which had provided the armor for the Drache class. Once more, the same subterfuge was employed to obtain the French-made plates and armored ram bows for the warships. These efforts proved to be far easier for Austrian agents based in Geneva than before, due to the growth in arms trafficking which followed the outbreak of the American Civil War. Indeed, the Austrians merely had to pose as Union or Confederate agents in order to avoid detection.

=== The Austrian ironclad debate ===
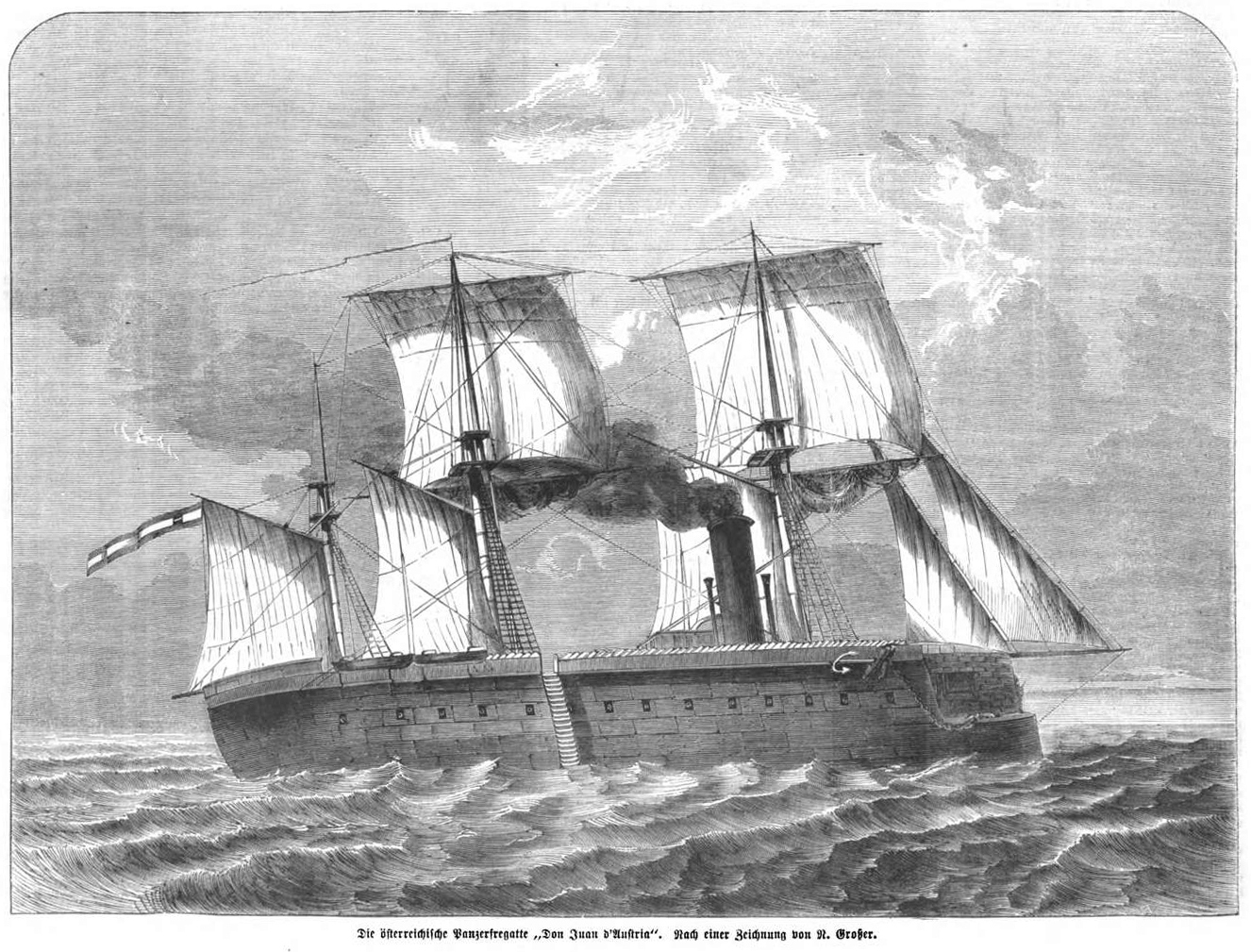
The Kaiser Max-class ironclad Don Juan d'Austria. She and her sister ships were designed as Austria's response to the Italian Re d'Italia-class ironclads.

While Emperor Franz Joseph I's support enabled Ferdinand Max's project to proceed despite the objections of several Austrian ministries and the Reichsrat, the political damage caused by the Oberkommandant der Marine circumventing the traditional budget process threatened the future development of the Imperial Austrian Navy. Calls were made from within the Reichsrat for Ferdinand Max to be placed under the supervision of the government. Not even the Imperial Austrian Army had this sort of political and bureaucratic freedom. Ferdinand Max ultimately agreed to a reshuffling of the roles he held within the Imperial Austrian Navy on the condition that a naval ministry would be formed to preserve the achievements he had made over the past half-decade. In January 1862, Franz Joseph I established a new ministry which would oversee the affairs of both the Imperial Austrian Navy, and the Austrian merchant marine, and named Count Matthais von Wickenburg its head. Under this new system, Ferdinand Max continued to be the Oberkommandant der Marine, but he was no longer responsible for the political management of the fleet. This move was made in opposition to the wishes of the Imperial Austrian Army, and the Reichsrat.

In order to address the gap between naval expenditures and construction plans with the will of the Reichsrat, which had rejected Ferdinand Max's ambitious proposals the year before, Emperor Franz Joseph I accepted a proposal from War Minister Count August von Degenfeld to convene a special commission to look at the role of the Imperial Austrian Navy. The Emperor convened this commission in February. The key question Franz Joseph I asked the commission was whether or not it was essential to maintain the Imperial Austrian Navy in order for Austria to remain a Great Power in Europe, if it was necessary for the navy to expand to the same size as the Regia Marina, and whether or not it the navy should transition towards prioritizing coastal defense, as opposed to wresting control of the Adriatic or Mediterranean Seas from Italy in the event of war.

Two camps quickly formed: Those who supported Ferdinand Max's ironclad program and wished to continue the arms race with Italy, and those who supported transitioning the Imperial Austrian Navy into a coastal defense force. Among those opposing the navy's ironclad program were German liberals from the Austrian interior and the Sudetenland, as well as other nationalities hailing from the inland parts of the Empire who had little interest in expanding Austrian sea power. The leader of the anti-ironclad, pro-coastal defense faction was Karl Möring, a former Austrian Army engineer with experience in heavy artillery. Möring argued that new fortifications and coastal artillery would be sufficient to defend Austria's limited maritime interests and its coastline, and that the large sums of money Ferdinand Max supported spending on constructing ironclad warships would be better spent elsewhere. Möring went so far as to publish a pamphlet attacking the Archduke's program outright, calling it a waste of Austrian finances and resources, while also arguing that an ironclad battle fleet would be of no value against Italy in the event of a war, as the decisive engagements Austria would fight in such a conflict would be on land.

At the commission's meeting in March 1862, Degenfeld disagreed with Möring's analysis and declared that it was imperative for the Imperial Austrian Navy to possess an ironclad fleet as powerful as the Regia Marina. Matthais von Wickenburg, the recently appointed naval minister, argued strongly that Ferdinand Max's ironclad construction proposals were essential to protecting Austria's growing merchant marine, and that ignoring Austria's seaborne trade by favoring coastal defense would harm the Austrian economy. Despite these arguments, Austrian Foreign Minister Johann von Rechberg strongly opposed the construction of any further ironclads, arguing along the same lines as Möring that "Austria is a land power, whose fate in case of war will be determined on land."

Rechberg began the commission's second meeting by attacking Ferdinand Max's proposal on financial grounds, arguing that the Imperial Austrian Navy had drastically overstepped financial allotments over the past decade, with the navy consistently overspending the limits placed upon it under the Navy Law of 1850. These arguments were rebutted by Wickenbug and Degenfeld on the grounds that the Navy Law of 1850 had been amended in 1858, and that the technological advancements which had played out since the First War of Italian Independence had likewise necessitated larger spending, as ironclads were far more expensive than traditional wooden ships. Arguments against expanding the navy were rejected by the members, and by a vote of six to five the commission voted to support maintaining an Imperial Austrian Navy that would be as large as the Italian Regia Marina. The commission had voted in favor of adopting most of Ferdinand Max's ironclad program, but only by a narrow margin, still placing the future of the Austrian ironclad program in doubt.

=== The Italian ironclad debate ===
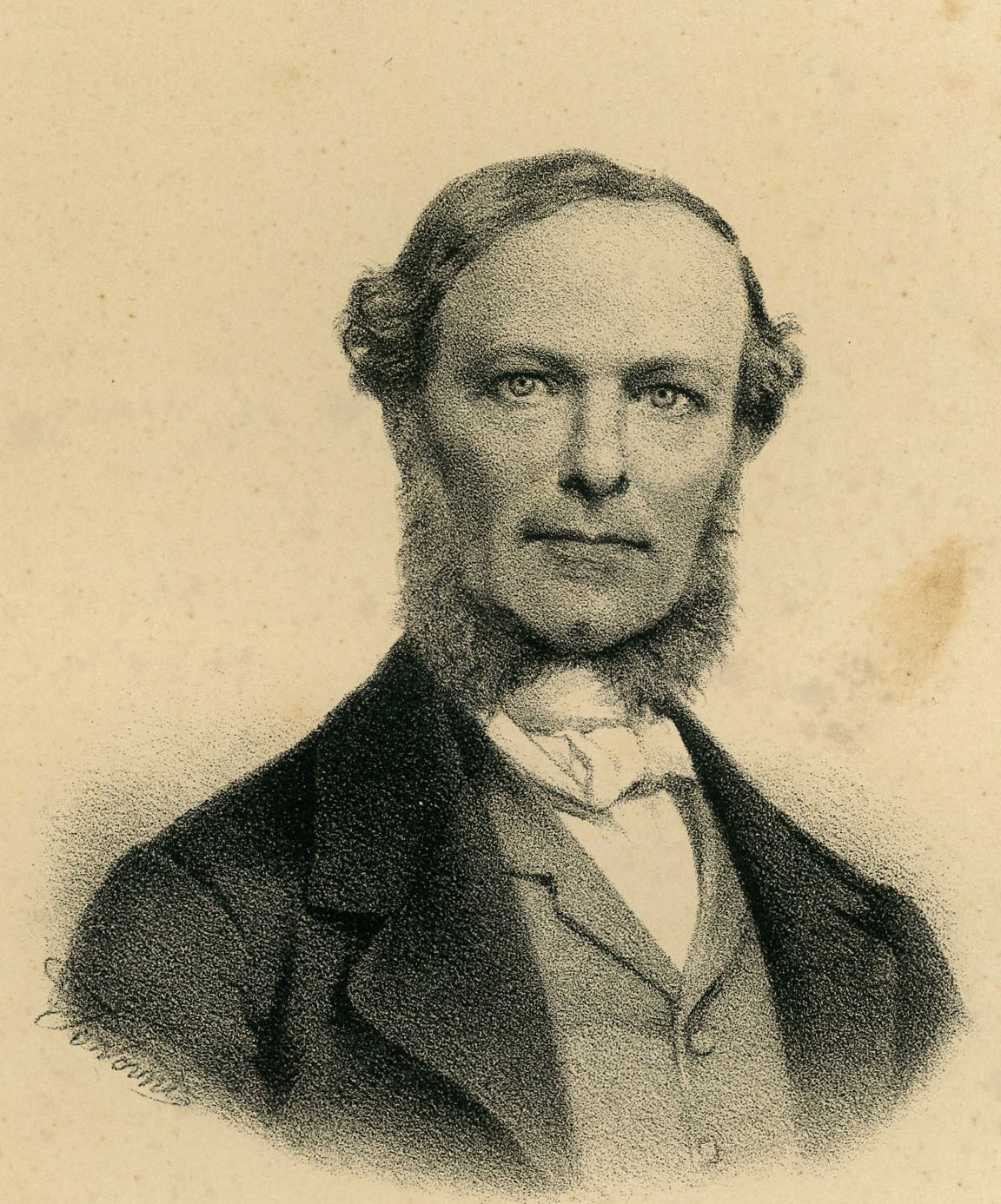
Italian Admiral Carlo Pellion di Persano. Persano championed of Italy's ironclad program and would later command Italian forces at the Battle of Lissa.

The death of Prime Minister Cavour in June 1861 was a major setback for the development of the Regia Marina. While Menabrea, the new head of the navy, had secured the deal Cavour had worked on for the Re d'Italia-class ironclads to be constructed in New York City, he did not personally believe in the value of the warships and worked to undo the agreement almost as soon as he had signed it. Indeed, Menabrea doubted the value of armored warships altogether, and in the months after Cavour's death, he attempted to redirect the Regia Marina away from ironclad construction and towards traditional wooden designs. Menabrea was supported by Nino Bixio, a veteran of Garibaldi's Expedition of the Thousand, who had previously served in the Sardinian Navy. They found opposition in Vice-Admiral Persano.

In the autumn of 1861, Menabrea convened a naval commission to examine the state of the Regia Marina and determine the value of continuing the construction of ironclad warships. The commission immediately concluded that the Regia Marina needed to be as large as the combined navies of the Kingdom of Spain and the Austrian Empire. Italian worries over a potential Austro-Spanish alliance dismembering the recently unified Kingdom of Italy, though ultimately unfounded, caused much concern among the Italian naval officer corps. This fear was caused in part by the hostile reaction of the Spanish government after the declaration of the Kingdom of Italy.

Unlike their Austrian counterparts, the Italian naval commission overwhelmingly opposed the construction of further ironclads, and supported a Regia Marina. This decision can in part be attributed to Menabrea's decision to appoint older Italian admirals as commission members, who had served most of their careers aboard wooden vessels. Using their recommendations, Menabrea proposed that four ships-of-the-line be constructed as the centerpiece of the Italian naval plan for 1862–1865. Menabrea attempted to placate all other factions within the Italian government by offering in the 1862–1865 naval program that the Regia Marina also acquire two ironclads from British shipyards for those who supported armored ships, twelve gunboats for those who supported coastal defense, and several transport ships for those who supported continuing the Risorgimento to the shores of Austria. Rather than win over the various different naval factions within Italy however, Menabrea's proposal disappointed nearly everyone and gained few supporters within the Chamber of Deputies. The proposal never got beyond the planning stages however, as Bettino Ricasoli, who had succeeded Cavour as prime minister, was forced to resign the office in March 1862. Urbano Rattazzi replaced Ricasoli as prime minister, and selected Persano as Italy's Minister of the Navy. Persano quickly went to work scrapping Menabrea's fleet plans, replacing it with plans for more ironclad warships.

=== The Battle of Hampton Roads ===
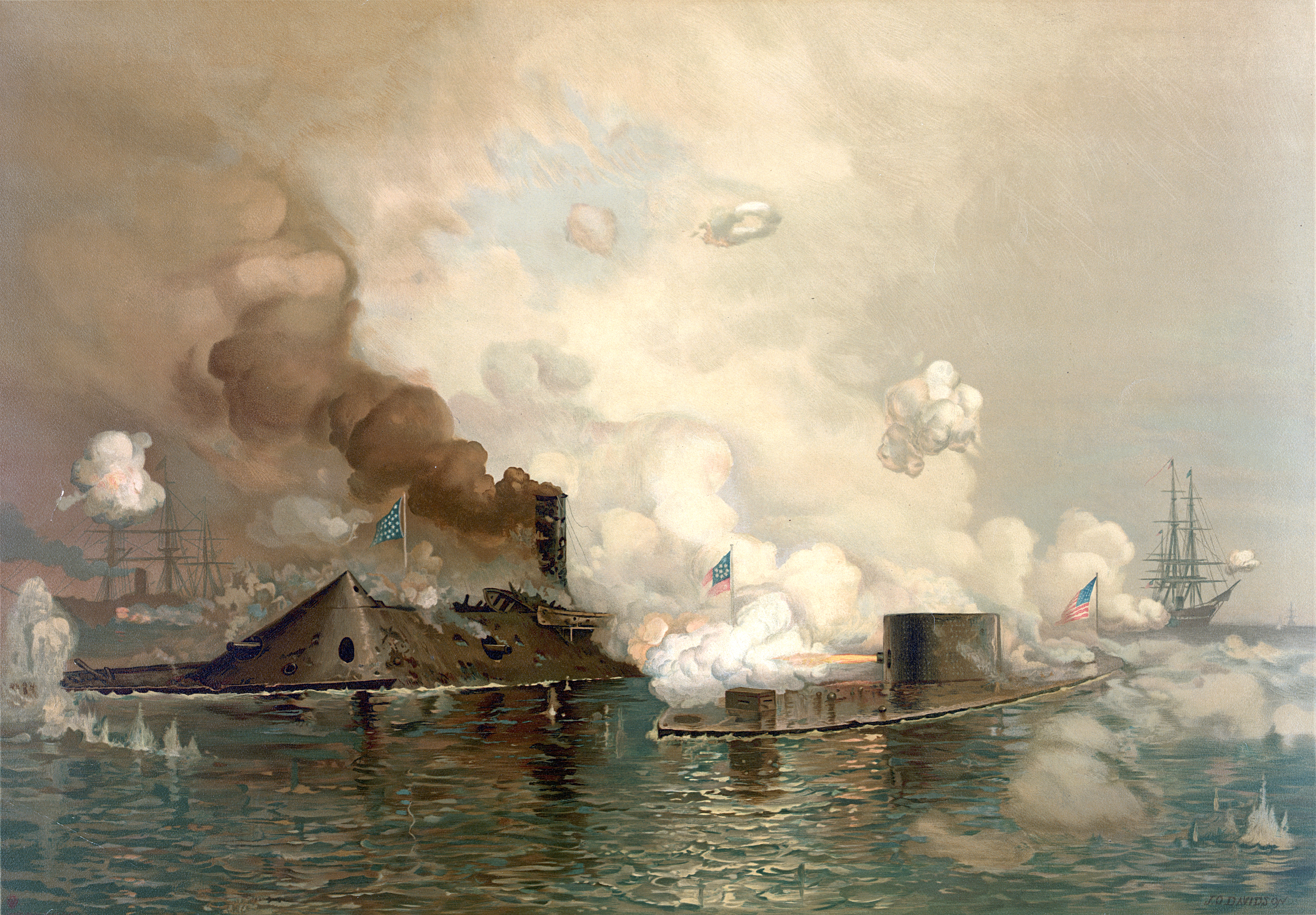
A chromolithograph depicting the Battle of Hampton Roads. The battle between the ironclads CSS Virginia and USS Monitor forever changed naval warfare and solidified both Austria's and Italy's decisions to continue with their own ironclad programs.

In April 1862, news of the Battle of Hampton Roads reached both Italy and Austria. The battle was the first ever engagement between ironclad warships, and it left an impression on most of the major navies in the world. The United Kingdom and France halted further construction of wooden-hulled ships. The use of a small number of very heavy guns, mounted so that they could fire in all directions soon became standard in warships of all types. Shipbuilders also incorporated rams into the designs of warship hulls. Within Austria and Italy, the Battle of Hampton Roads influenced both nations' decision to continue with their ironclad programs and the abandonment of wooden vessels.

In Austria, the results of the battle were so decisive that Rechberg reversed his opinion completely, and asked the Reichsrat to approve all the new naval expenditures Ferdinand Max had been calling for. In June, the Reichsrat approved Archduke Ferdinand Max's budget, but directed the Oberkommandant der Marine to cut expenditures not related to training, naval construction and ship maintenance. The Reichsrat also ordered Ferdinand Max to purchase more coal from domestic sources, and to only rarely send warships out beyond the Mediterranean Sea. For 1863, the Imperial Austrian Navy was allocated some 8,900,000 Florins, a huge sum and far higher than previous budget outlays, but this was below the 10,900,000 Florins that Ferdinand Max had originally asked for. In compensation however, Wickenburg was able to acquire a further 4,000,000 Florins from the Reichsrat for the navy's 1862 budget. In November, the bill was approved and the Imperial Austrian Navy received its largest budget in history.

When news of the battle reached the Italian government, Persano addressed the Chamber of Deputies, arguing that Menabrea's proposed four ships-of-the-line were technologically obsolete, and that Regia Marina instead needed additional ironclads. Persano's plan included purchasing four ironclads from French shipyards, and constructing three additional ironclads domestically. This proposal was further revised in June, when Persano addressed the Chamber of Deputies and shared his support for incorporating Menabrea's earlier plan to purchase two ironclads from British shipyards, bringing the total number of proposed ironclads the Regia Marina would construct or purchase by 1865 to nine.

== Prelude to war ==
=== Italian ironclad expansion ===
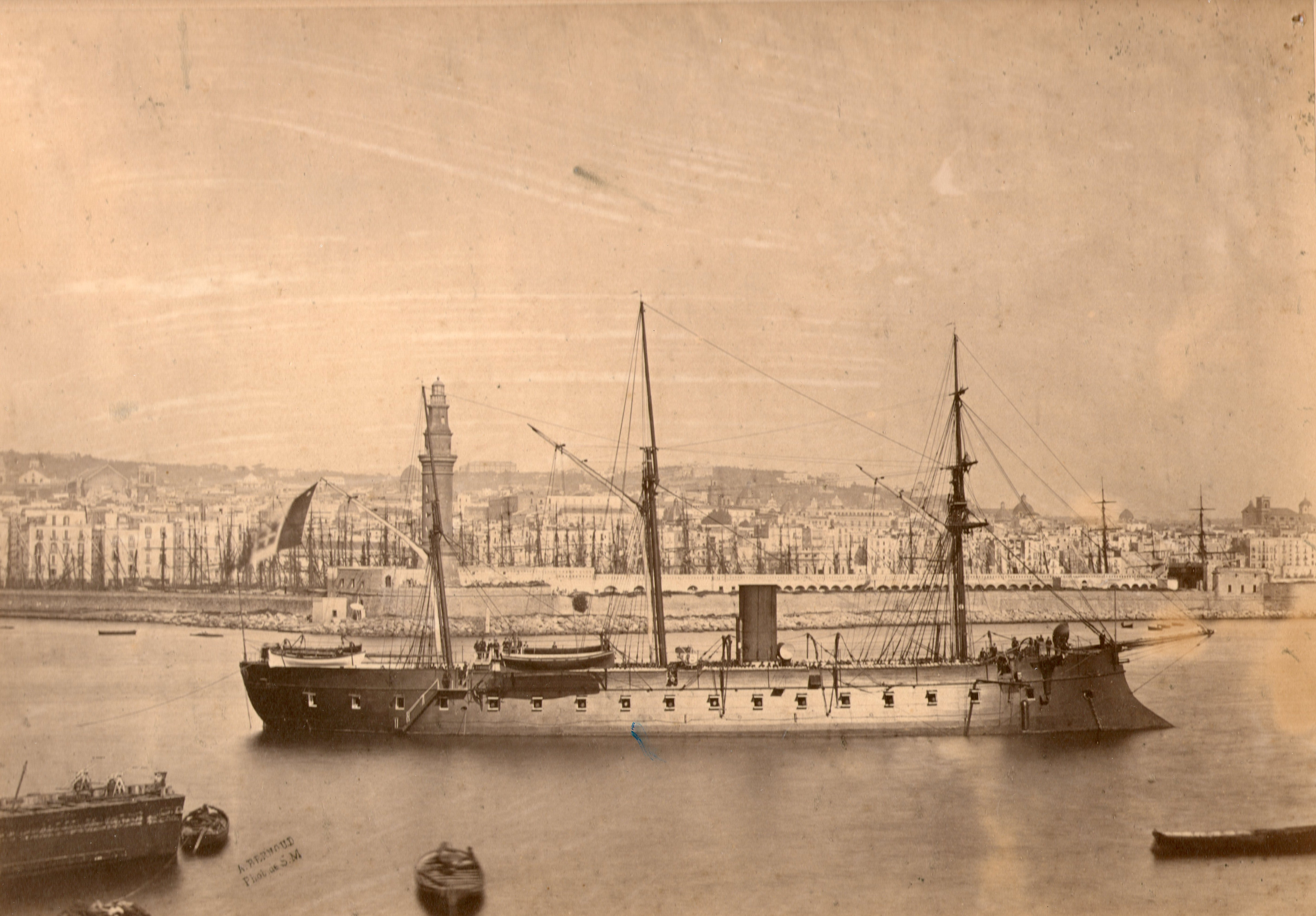
The Italian ironclad Castelfidardo in Naples. The construction of Castelfidardo and her sister ships marked the second stage of the Italian ironclad program.

One week after presenting his ironclad plan to the Chamber of Deputies, Persano obtained approval from Prime Minister Rattazzi's cabinet to proceed. Soon after, Persano signed contracts for four ironclads to begin construction in French shipyards. These ships would ultimately form the Regina Maria Pia class. All four ships were designed by French naval architects, but three different shipyards were used to construct them, with Regina Maria Pia and San Martino both being constructed at the Société Nouvelle des Forges et Chantiers de la Méditerranée shipyard in La Seyne, while Castelfidardo and Ancona were constructed at the Gouin et Guibert shipyard in St. Nazaire, and the Arman Brothers shipyard in Bordeaux, respectively.

In October 1862, Persano also placed an order with the British shipyard Mare of Millwall, London, for an armored steam ram. Designed by Italian naval officer Simone Antonio Saint-Bon, financial problems related to the construction of the ironclad resulted in the order being transferred to the shipyard Harrison, also located in Millwall. Saint-Bon had originally intended the ship to be unarmed, relying only on its ram to sink enemy ships, but Harrison engineers revised the plan to include two large-caliber guns. While based on the design of USS Monitor, the Italians intended Affondatore to have two turrets as opposed to one. She would become the most expensive warship the Regia Marina had ever ordered at the time. Indeed, the costs to construct the ironclad were so high that Persano had to substitute the two British-built ironclads Menabrea had initially proposed and which he had supported, for this single warship.

In early 1863, Persano also went to work constructing a class of domestically-built ironclads. Shortly after negotiating contracts for French and British-built ships, orders for two Roma-class ironclads were placed with Cantiere della Foce in Genoa. These two ships, Roma and Venezia, were only the second class of ironclad warships to be domestically constructed in Italy. By the time construction on the ships would begin in February 1863, foreign navies had begun to experiment with the central battery ships, a design which discarded the usual broadside arrangement in favor of a shorter battery located amidships. This allowed the Roma-class ships to use a significantly shorter and much lighter section of side armor to protect the guns of each ship, which in turn permitted the carrying of heavier, more powerful guns.

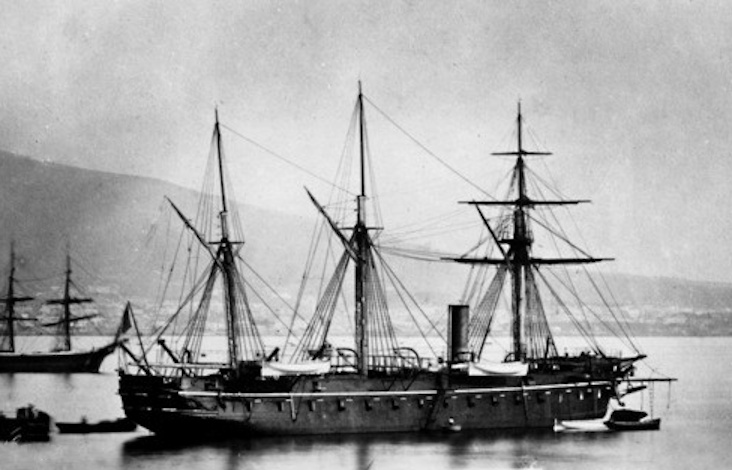
The Italian ironclad Principe di Carignano, lead ship of her namesake class

At the same time Italy's first ironclads, the Formidabile class, were under construction, the first two vessels of the Principe di Carignano class were ordered. These ships, initially Principe di Carignano, Messina, and Principe Umberto, were much like their predecessors in that they were initially conceived as screw-frigates by the Sardinian Navy. Principe di Carignano was laid in Genoa by Cantiere della Foce in January 1861, while Messina was laid down by the Regio Cantiere di Castellammare di Stabia in September in Castellammare di Stabia. Despite plans to initially construct the class as wooden vessels, changing technology and the emergence of ironclads in foreign navies such as with the French ironclad Gloire and the British HMS Warrior, led to efforts to redesign the ships. In an attempt to grow his ironclad program even further, Persano followed the lead Cavour established earlier in converting the Formidabile class, and worked to do the same with the Principe di Carignano class. His efforts were successful and most of these ships were converted into ironclads despite being in the middle of construction, though Principe Umberto was too far advanced in her construction to allow for this conversion, leading to her completion as a wooden vessel. To replace her, a new ship was ordered, Conte Verde. She was laid down in Livorno in March 1863 by Cantiere navale fratelli Orlando. As with their older counterparts, the Principe di Carignano-class ships were likewise redesigned with the implicit purpose of wrestling control of the Mediterranean and Adriatic Seas from the Austrian Empire in the event of a war for control of Italian-speaking parts of the Empire.

As a result of Persano's work, by the spring of 1863 the Regia Marina had over a dozen ironclads under contract or under construction, though only the first two ships built during Cavour's tenure as prime minister had actually been completed.

=== Austria counters ===
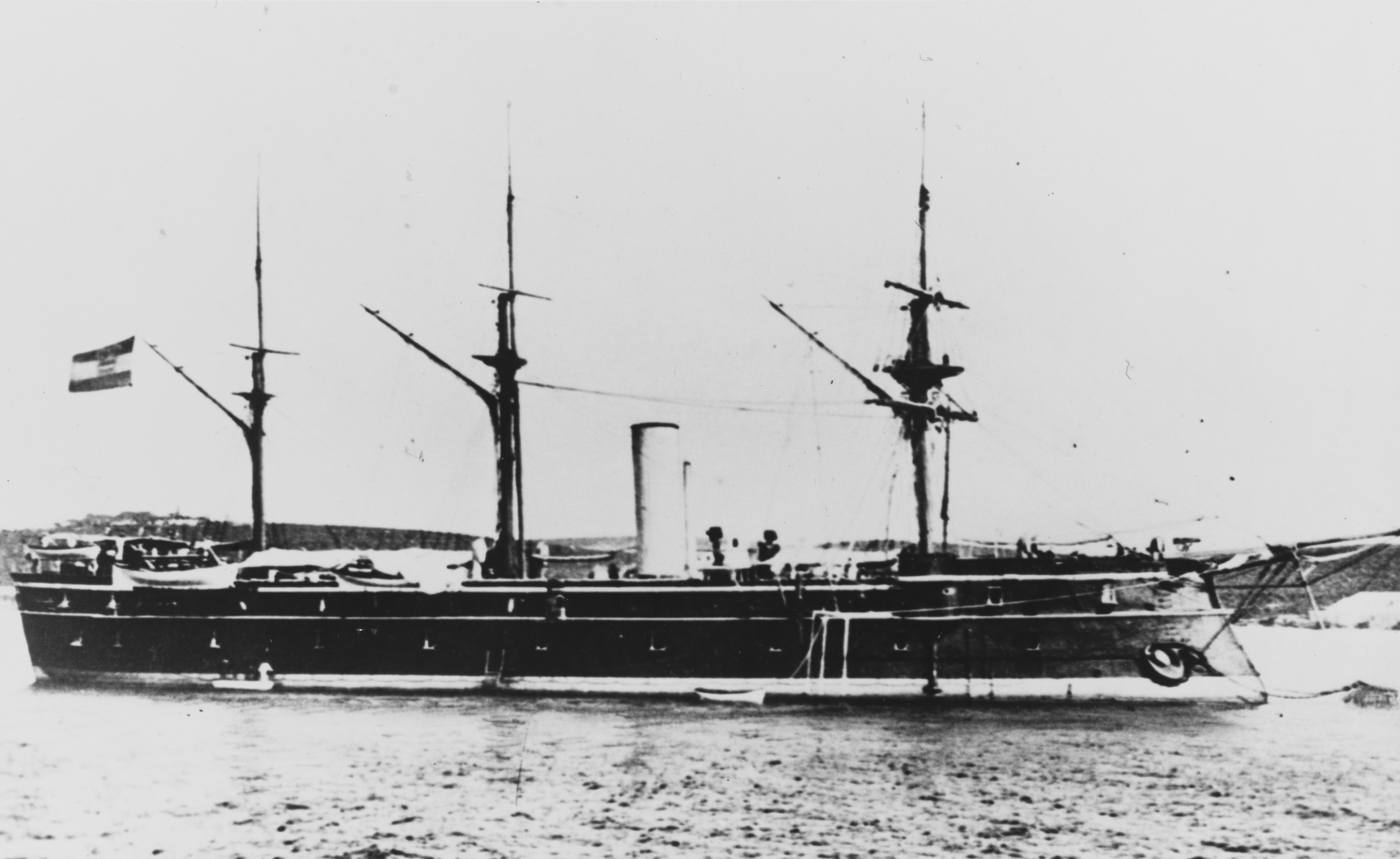
The Austrian ironclad Erzherzog Ferdinand Max, lead ship of her namesake class and named after Archduke Ferdinand Max, who had overseen Austria's ironclad construction program

The 1862 naval budget presented to Ferdinand Max allowed him to pay for the Kaiser Max-class ironclads, but the funds appropriated for 1863 were only enough for two additional ironclads, as opposed to the three he had asked for. Despite this set back, construction on the two ships began in the late spring of 1863. Many of the same individuals who had been instrumental in the design and construction of Austria's earlier ironclads returned to play those roles once more, with Romako designing both ships. These two ironclads were significantly larger than the Drache and Kaiser Max-class ships, and were originally intended to carry thirty-two 48-pounder muzzle-loading guns, though during the construction process the Navy decided to opt for a battery of new breech-loading guns manufactured by Krupp. At any rate, the Imperial Austrian Navy was forced to hastily complete the ships with only sixteen of the original 48-pounder guns due to the outbreak of the Seven Weeks War in 1866. Named after the Archduke himself, Erzherzog Ferdinand Max would serve as the lead ship of her namesake class. She was laid down by Stabilimento Tecnico Triestino in Trieste in May 1863 and was followed a month later by her sister ship, Habsburg. The construction of these ships meant that despite financial challenges, Austria was poised to have seven ironclads by 1865.

== Financial impact on the early arms race ==
=== Austria ===
The Austrian naval budget of 1862 would prove to be the largest such outlay the Imperial Austrian Navy would receive until 1900. Even so, the 1863 budget of only 8,900,000 Florins was far less than what Archduke Ferdinand Max had hoped for. This limited his ability to construct additional ironclads, having to scrap the third planned ship for the Erzherzog Ferdinand Max class. Ferdinand Max ran into even more financial issues when his plans to convert the ship-of-the-line Kaiser had to be delayed due to a lack of funds. As a result, Austria was only able to construct seven ironclads between 1860 and 1865, as opposed to the nine Ferdinand Max had previously advocated for to the Austrian Reichsrat in April 1861.

In a bid to maintain the navy's finances in the face of potential budget cuts, Ferdinand Max attempted to cut expenditures in nearly every aspect of the Imperial Austrian Navy outside of ironclad construction. Patrols conducted by the Imperial Austrian Navy were severely curtailed, and warships rarely left the Mediterranean Sea. Indeed, with the exception of Tegetthoff's patrol off the coast of Greece to protect Austrian interests in the Balkan kingdom during Greece's constitutional crisis between 1862 and 1863, Austrian warships hardly ever ventured out beyond the Adriatic Sea. The smaller Austrian naval budgets also forced Ferdinand Max to reluctantly turn down proposals from foreign shipbuilders to construct additional ironclad warships for the Imperial Austrian Navy. Among those whose offers the Archduke had to reject for a lack of funds were American shipbuilder John Ericsson, the designer of USS Monitor, and the Arman Brothers shipyard in Bordeaux, which was constructing the Italian ironclad Ancona.

Austrian Naval Budgets: 1861–1865
(in millions of Florin) (Note: This table depicts Austria's approved naval budget between 1861 and 1865. It does not include any funds which the Imperial Austrian Navy overspent during this period, though existing estimates state the navy did not overspend more than 300,000 Florins in any given year. See Sondhaus (1989) p. 234)

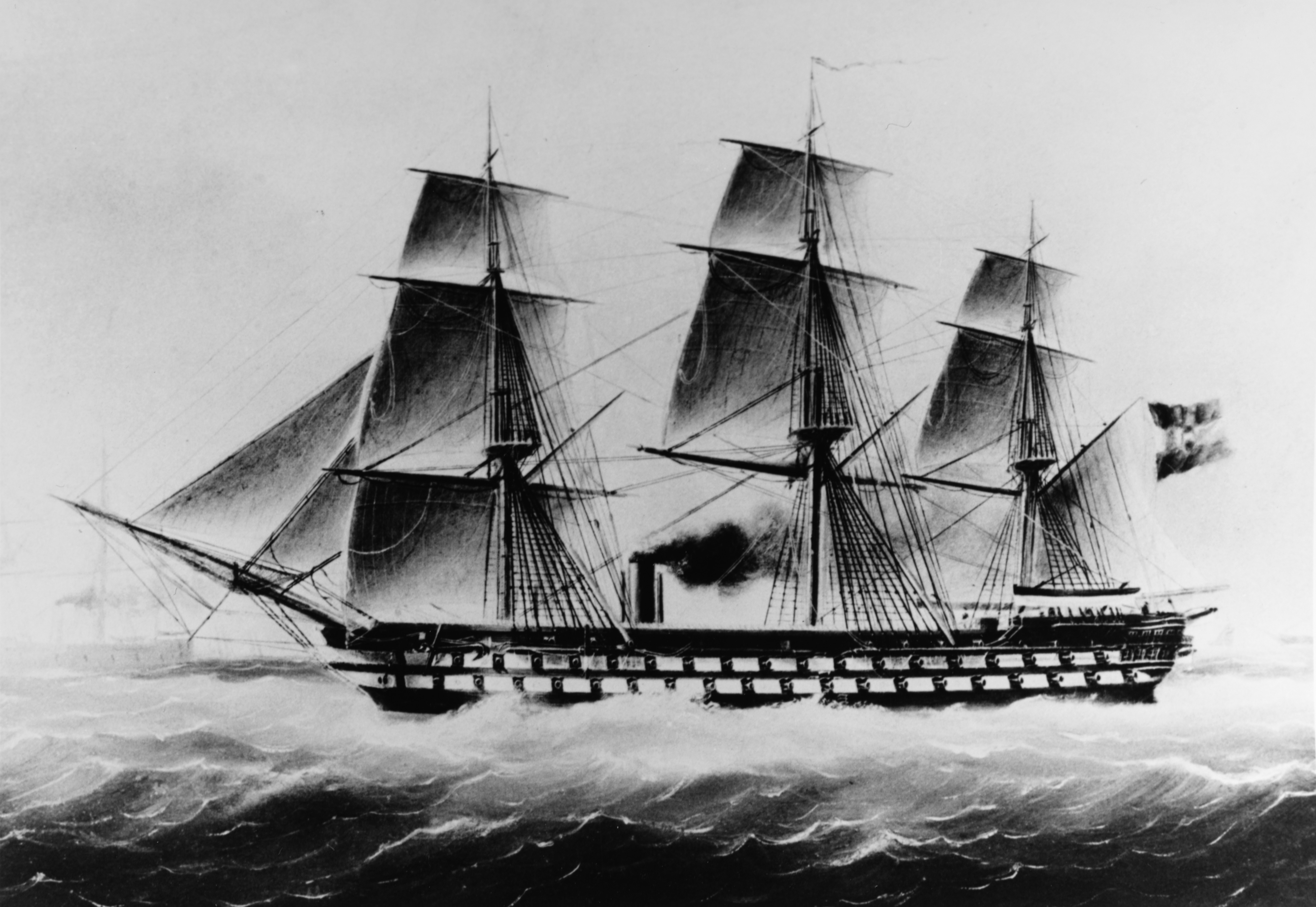
The Austrian ship-of-the-line Kaiser. Due to financial constraints, plans to convert her into an ironclad had to be delayed until after the Seven Weeks War.

Ferdinand Max was forced to acquire the funds he needed to expand Austria's ironclad battle fleet by selling off older vessels in the Imperial Austrian Navy's possession. Indeed, the speed in which Italy had been constructing or purchasing new ironclads since 1860, coupled with his own desire to keep pace with Italian ironclad acquisitions, forced the Archduke to consider selling nearly all of Austria's wooden vessels. His first opportunity to do so came in November 1862 when he attempted to negotiate the sale of older frigates and corvettes to Confederate arms dealer Louis Merton. In February 1863, this potential deal grew more likely, as the Archduke compiled a series of unarmored ships he believed the Imperial Austrian Navy could part with. This list included a frigate, two corvettes, 14 gunboats and schooners, and nine paddle steamers. Ferdinand Max offered all 26 ships to Merton for roughly six million florins, enough to theoretically enable him to construct the one large armored frigate which could serve as the flagship of the Imperial Austrian Navy. Unfortunately for the Archduke, Merton rejected the offer as the Confederate government had instructed him to only purchase ironclads, or ships capable of navigating the North American Intracoastal Waterway.

Further attempts to purchase ironclads from British shipyards which had been constructing them for the Confederacy in late 1863 failed as well, due to the sheer costs of the warships involved. Despite an increase in funds under the 1864 budget to some 12,100,000 Florins, none of the money the Reichsrat had allocated to the Imperial Austrian Navy were earmarked for ironclad construction or purchases, leaving Ferdinand Max with the same seven ironclads as before. Faced with political gridlock and having been offered the throne of the Second Mexican Empire in October 1863, Archduke Ferdinand Max resigned his post as Oberkommandant der Marine in early 1864 before sailing to Mexico aboard the frigate Novara to become Emperor Maximilian I of Mexico.

In the years after Ferdinand Max's departure from Austria, the Imperial Austrian Navy suffered under further political and budgetary constraints. In April 1864, it was proposed that the naval ministry, which the former Archduke had helped to establish, be disbanded. In January 1865, Emperor Franz Joseph I dissolved the ministry and the Imperial Austrian Navy was again placed under the jurisdiction of the Austrian Ministry of War. Under the 1865 budget, just 7,100,000 Florins were allocated towards naval expenses, but once more, none of the funds were designated for warship construction. In 1866, the naval budget grew slightly to 7,800,000 Florins, but for the third consecutive year there would be no funds for additional ironclads, or other warships. Thus, when the Seven Weeks War began in June 1866, the Imperial Austrian Navy would possess only ships which had been constructed during Ferdinand Max's tenure as Oberkommandant der Marine.

=== Italy ===
Political chaos and budgetary restraints in Italy likewise forced a slowdown in the rapid pace in which the Regia Marina had been arming itself with ironclad warships. In June 1862, Garibaldi, determined to conquer Rome and bring the Papal States into Italy, sailed from Genoa and landed at Palermo, intending to gather volunteers for the impending campaign to Rome. By the time he crossed over into mainland Italy, he had a force of some two thousand volunteers. After landing at Melito on 14 August, Garibaldi and his forces marched at once into the Calabrian mountains. Far from supporting this second expedition however, the Italian government strongly opposed Garibaldi's actions. General Enrico Cialdini dispatched a division of the Royal Italian Army, under Colonel Emilio Pallavicini, against Garibaldi's volunteer corps. On 28 August the two forces met in the rugged Aspromonte. After roughly 10 minutes of fighting, there were 15 casualties, including Garibaldi himself who had been shot in the exchange of fire. The fighting ended quickly, as Garibaldi and his volunteers surrendered and were taken prisoner. The political backlash to the "battle" at Aspromonte and Garibaldi's subsequent arrest was enormous in Italy. December 1862, Rattazzi's government fell over the controversy, and Luigi Carlo Farini succeeded him as Prime Minister. Persano was thus removed as Italy's Minister of the Navy. When Marco Minghetti became prime minister in March 1863, General Efisio Cugia was chosen to replace Persano.

Cugia inherited a Regia Marina rapidly growing in size and quickly acquiring ironclad warships. Support among the general public and the Regia Marina's officer corps for expanding the navy and constructing new ironclads remained high, with a new naval commission even going so far as to call for a massive battle fleet of 40 ironclads. Additionally, previous opponents of ironclad warships such as Bixio, had since been convinced of their importance following the Battle of Hampton Roads. Indeed, Bixio subsequently became one of the most vocal supporters of Italy's ironclad program after having previously opposed the concept during Persano's years as head of the Ministry of the Navy.

Italian Naval Budgets: 1861–1865
(in millions of Florin) (Note: This table depicts Italy's approved naval budget between 1861 and 1865. It does not include the estimated 30,000,000 Florin the Regia Marina overspent between 1861 and 1865. See Gabriele & Fritz (1982) pp. 268–269) (Note: A nominal exchange rate of 2.5 lira to 1 Florin is used. See Sondhaus (1989) p. 234)

Cugia attempted to carry on the work which began under Cavour and had continued under Persano. In addition to ordering additional transports, shallow-draft gunboats which could be used to seize Venice by sea, Cugia also ordered yet another class of Italian ironclads, named the Principe Amedeo class. The first ship of the class, Principe Amedeo, was laid down at the Arsenale di La Spezia in August 1865. She was followed by Palestro, which was laid down the same month by Regio Cantiere di Castellammare di Stabia. The design for Principe Amedeo was prepared by Inspector Engineer Giuseppe De Luca. He had initially planned on using entirely wooden hulls for the ships, but had changed to composite wood and iron construction by the time the ships were laid down. The two ships were also the last Italian ironclads to feature sailing rigs and wooden hulls.

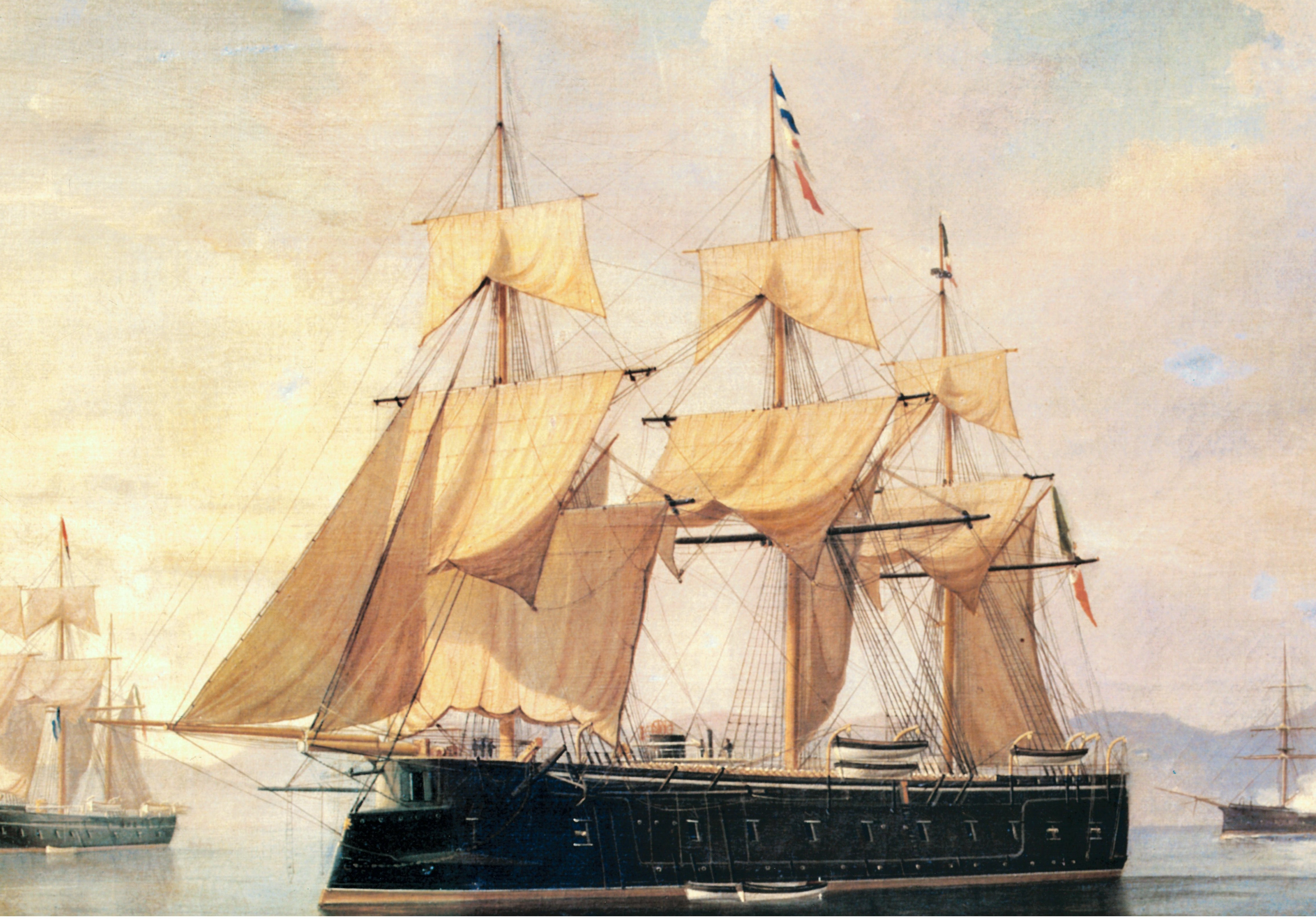
The Principe Amedeo-class ironclads would be the last ships of their type to be laid down by Italy before the outbreak of the Seven Weeks War in 1866, however neither Principe Amedeo nor her sister ship Palestro would be commissioned into the Regia Marina until nearly a decade after the war.

By the time discussions were underway regarding the Principe Amedeo class, the Regia Marina had already acquired the French-built armored frigates of the Formidabile class, and two more vessels of the Re d'Italia class were under construction in the United States. The ironclad Affondatore had also been ordered in the United Kingdom, while the four ships of the Regina Maria Pia class were under construction in French shipyards. Furthermore, three wooden steam frigates of the Principe di Carignano class, already under construction, were being converted into armored ships, and two more ironclads of the Roma class had been ordered from Italian shipyards. This meant the two new ships of the Principe Amedeo class would bring the Regia Marina's total number of ironclads to 16 ships.

The Principe Amedeo class would be the last two ships of this first generation of Italian ironclads however. The sheer number of ironclads the Regia Marina was constructing and ordering, combined with the relatively short time-span in which Italy had engaged in its ironclad build up, was beginning to place a severe strain on the newly unified kingdom's finances. The dependence on foreign shipyards to construct many of the ironclads also helped to drastically raise costs, already high to begin with, even further. By 1865, Italian naval expenditures began to drastically outpace the budgetary outlays the Chamber of Deputies had authorized for the Regia Marina. Despite the fact that the Italian government had allocated larger naval budgets than their Austrian counterparts for every year between 1861 and 1865, for the first four years of its existence, the Regia Marina consistently spent million of lira more than what the Chamber of Deputies had authorized it. Indeed, the Regia Marina exceeded its budget by roughly 75,000,000 lira between 1861 and 1865.

Italy once again had a turnover in prime ministers following public backlash over the September Convention of 1864. Minghetti was ousted and Alfonso Ferrero La Marmora succeeded him on 28 September 1864. La Marmora's first objective as prime minister was to cut government expenditures and finally balance the Italian budget. After appointing General Diego Angioletti to the office of Minister of the Navy, La Marmora worked the shrink the size of the Regia Marina's budget, and bring the era of overspending budgetary outlays to an end. Using Spain's decision to finally recognize the Kingdom of Italy as a catalyst to begin debates over the size of the naval budget, La Marmora argued before the Chamber of Deputies that the Regia Marina possessed or had under construction more than enough warships of all types, including ironclads, to defeat the Imperial Austrian Navy in battle. Despite strong opposition from Persano, Cugia, and Bixio, La Marmora's government began to reduce naval expenditures and ended further ironclad purchases and construction projects for the time being. The government would instead focus on completing ships already under construction or under contract in the lead up to the Seven Weeks War.

== The Seven Weeks War ==
A map of alliances during the Seven Weeks War. Note Italy in the bottom of the map is shaded as a Prussian ally.

=== Background ===
Austria's attention was drawn away from Italy at a time when it appeared the ironclad arms race between the two nations was fading. In late 1863, the Schleswig–Holstein question once again captured the attention of most of the German Confederation after Christian IX became king of Denmark and duke of Schleswig and Holstein. He declared the Duchy of Schleswig an integral part of Denmark in a violation of the London Protocol of 1852, which emphasized the status of the Kingdom of Denmark as distinct from the independent Duchies of Schleswig and Holstein. The annexation of the largely German populations of Schleswig and Holstein gave the German Confederation a casus belli to use against Denmark, and the Second Schleswig War began when Prussian and Austrian troops crossed the border into Schleswig in February 1864. After eight months of fighting, the Danes were defeated and the two states won control of Schleswig and Holstein in the Peace of Vienna.

The Peace of Vienna was not to last however. Shortly after concluding the Second Schleswig War, Minister President of Prussia Otto von Bismarck began to lay the foundations for diplomatically isolating Austria and giving Prussia the opportunity to settle the German Question once and for all by force of arms. In April 1866, the Prussian government signed a secret agreement with Italy, committing each state to assist the other in a war against Austria. On 14 June, the Seven Weeks War began when Prussia attacked Austria's allies in the German Confederation.

=== Naval warfare between Austria and Italy ===
At the onset of the war, Italy appeared to have a far stronger navy than Austria did, in large part to the massive ironclad program Cavour and Persano engaged in shortly after the unification of Italy. While the Regia Marina possessed far more ironclads than the Imperial Austrian Navy, Italian Minister of the Navy, Diego Angioletti, realized Italy's naval strength lay primarily on paper only. In June 1866, the Regia Marina was in a state of disarray after years of unstable Italian governments, and consistent turnover among the ranks of the navy's officer corps. Italian sailors had received little to no training, and many warships did not have trained engineers, gunners, or officers. Indeed, despite Austria's multi-ethnic, multi-national empire which had nearly torn the country apart in 1848, the multi-lingual Imperial Austrian Navy was far more united than its Italian counterpart. Regional divisions which first emerged shortly after the unification of Italy and the establishment of the Regia Marina had begun to flare up in the years shortly before the war. Neapolitan and Sardinian officers regularly quarreled. The naval traditions of Venice also strongly clashed with those of Sardinia, Sicily, and Naples. Many Venetian officers and sailors in Italian service viewed Sardinian, Sicilian, and Neapolitan sailors as inexperienced, leading to severe disputes between men from Venice and the rest of Italy.

Nevertheless, Italy's ironclad advantage of 12 to 7, led to great expectations. Nino Bixio, who had previously opposed the concept of ironclads only to enthusiastically endorse their acquisition by the Kingdom of Italy following the Battle of Hampton Roads, described the Regia Marina as "Incontestably superior" to the Imperial Austrian Navy. These sentiments were shared by the Italian public, the Chamber of Deputies, and the Regia Marina itself. A quick victory over the Imperial Austrian Navy was expected, to be followed by Italian naval dominance over both the Mediterranean and Adriatic Seas.

La Marmora resigned as Prime Minister on 17 June in order to become King Victor Emmanuel II's chief-of-staff. Angiolette likewise resigned as Minister of the Navy in order to be given a command with the Italian army, which was expected to see the bulk of the fighting with Austria. Their replacements, Bettino Ricasoli as prime minister and Agostino Depretis as minister of the navy, set out to secure Italian dominance over the Adriatic. Shortly after Italy declared war on Austria on 20 June, Ricasoli laid out plans for Italy's annexation of Venice, Trentino, Trieste, the Dalmatian Coast, Istria, and Fiume. Depretis strongly believed the Regia Marina was strong enough to secure these conquests. On 25 June, the Regia Marina's main battle fleet, led by Persano, made port at Ancona in anticipation of engaging the Imperial Austrian Navy in the Adriatic.

While Italy prepared for a naval offensive in the Adriatic in order to put pressure on Trieste, Venice, and Fiume, Austria's naval strategy at the beginning of the war was primarily defensive-oriented. The two latest Austrian ironclads, Ferdinand Max and Habsburg, were awaiting the final delivery of their Krupp guns at the onset of the war. The conflict with Prussia meant these guns could not be delivered, forcing the Imperial Austrian Navy to install old smooth-bore guns aboard the ships instead. Nevertheless, Rear Admiral Wilhelm von Tegetthoff selected Ferdinand Max as the flagship of his fleet and began training exercises with its crew off the coast of Fasana. Owing to the Italian advantage in ironclads, Tegetthoff worked to upgrade his existing wooden vessels for combat as well, draping many in chains and scrap iron to increase their protection in battle. Following the Battle of Custoza on 24 June, Tegetthoff was given permission by Field Marshal Archduke Albrecht to attack the Regia Marina as he saw fit. Consequentially, Tegetthoff brought the Imperial Austrian Navy to Ancona on 26 June in an attempt to draw out the Italians, but the Italian commander, Admiral Persano, refused to engage. Tegetthoff made another sortie on 6 July, but again could not bring the Italian fleet to battle.

==== The Battle of Lissa ====
The initial deployment of Tegetthoff's and Persano's fleets at the Battle of Lissa

On 16 July, Persano took the Italian fleet, with twelve ironclads, out of Ancona, bound for the island of Lissa, where they arrived on 18 July. With them, they brought troop transports carrying 3,000 soldiers. Persano then spent the next two days bombarding the Austrian defenses of the island and unsuccessfully attempting to force a landing. Tegetthoff received a series of telegrams between 17 July and 19 July notifying him of the Italian attack, which he initially believed to be a feint to draw the Austrian fleet away from its main bases at Pola and Venice. By the morning of 19 July, however, he was convinced that Lissa was in fact the Italian objective, and so he prepared his fleet to attack. As Tegetthoff's fleet arrived off Lissa on the morning of 20 July, Persano's fleet was arrayed for another landing attempt. The latter's ships were divided into three groups, with only the first two able to concentrate in time to meet the Austrians. Tegetthoff had arranged his ironclad ships into a wedge-shaped formation, leading with Erzherzog Ferdinand Max at the center. The ironclads Don Juan d'Austria, Drache, and Prinz Eugen were on the right, and the ironclads Habsburg, Salamander, and Kaiser Max were on his left. The Austrian wooden warships of the second and third divisions followed behind in the same formation.

Shortly before the action began, Admiral Persano left his flagship, the ironclad Re d'Italia, and transferred to the turret ship Affondatore, though none of his subordinates on the other ships were aware of the change. They were thus left to fight as individuals without direction. More dangerously, by stopping Re d'Italia, he allowed a significant gap to open up between Vacca's three ships and the rest of the fleet. The battle began with Principe di Carignano opening fire at a range of roughly 1,000 yards (910 m) on the approaching Austrians. The Italian gunnery was poor, and their initial shooting missed the Austrian ships, allowing Tegetthoff to make a pass through the gap in the Italian line. This attempt failed however to ram any of the Italian ships, forcing him to turn around and make another pass. During this first approach, the Austrian ironclad Prinz Eugen opened fire on Persano's lead ships with her bow guns but did not score any hits. In response, the Italian ironclad Affondatore attempted to ram her, but narrowly missed the Austrian warship. Meanwhile, the Austrian ironclads Habsburg and Salamander were not as heavily engaged in the ensuing melee and did not attempt to ram any Italian vessels, apart from a single failed attempt by Salamander to strike an unidentified Italian ironclad. Instead, the ships employed converging fire, though largely without success. During this period, the leading Italian ironclads, Principe di Carignano and Castelfidardo, opened fire at long range on the Austrian ironclads Habsburg, Kaiser Max, and Salamander, though the Italians only managed to score indirect hits on Salamander, hitting her 35 times but failing to score any decisive hits or inflict serious damage.

Sea Battle at Lissa by Carl Frederik Sørensen

Meanwhile, the Austrian ironclad Drache engaged the coastal defense ship Palestro with concentrated broadsides, including hot shot, which started a serious fire aboard Palestro. The latter attempted to withdraw, and was able to use her superior speed to escape from Drache. Left without her original target, Drache turned to fire at Re d'Italia along with several other Austrian vessels. One of them disabled the Italian ironclad's rudder, leaving her incapable of maneuvering. In the ensuing firefight however, Drache was hit several times; one shell struck her commander, Captain Moll Heinrich von Moll, in the head, killing him instantly.

Re d'Italia's disabled rudder presented another opportunity for Tegetthoff to ram the vessel at full speed. After two collisions which occurred at angles too oblique to inflict serious damage, Erzherzog Ferdinand Max struck the Italian ship directly. Erzherzog Ferdinand Max's ram tore a gaping hole in Re d'Italia's hull on the port side below the ship's waterline, though the Austrian ironclad sustained no significant damage herself. Tegetthoff reversed course, allowing the Italian ironclad to lurch back to port and quickly sink. He initially ordered his crew to lower boats to pick up the Italians struggling in the water, but the Italian ironclad San Martino was approaching, and he could not allow his ship to become a stationary target. Instead, he ordered the aviso Kaiserin Elizabeth to remain behind and pick up the survivors while Erzherzog Ferdinand Max engaged San Martino. The other Italian ships, however, did not realize Kaiserin Elizabeth was attempting to pick up the Italian survivors, and so opened fire on her, driving her away from the men in the water.

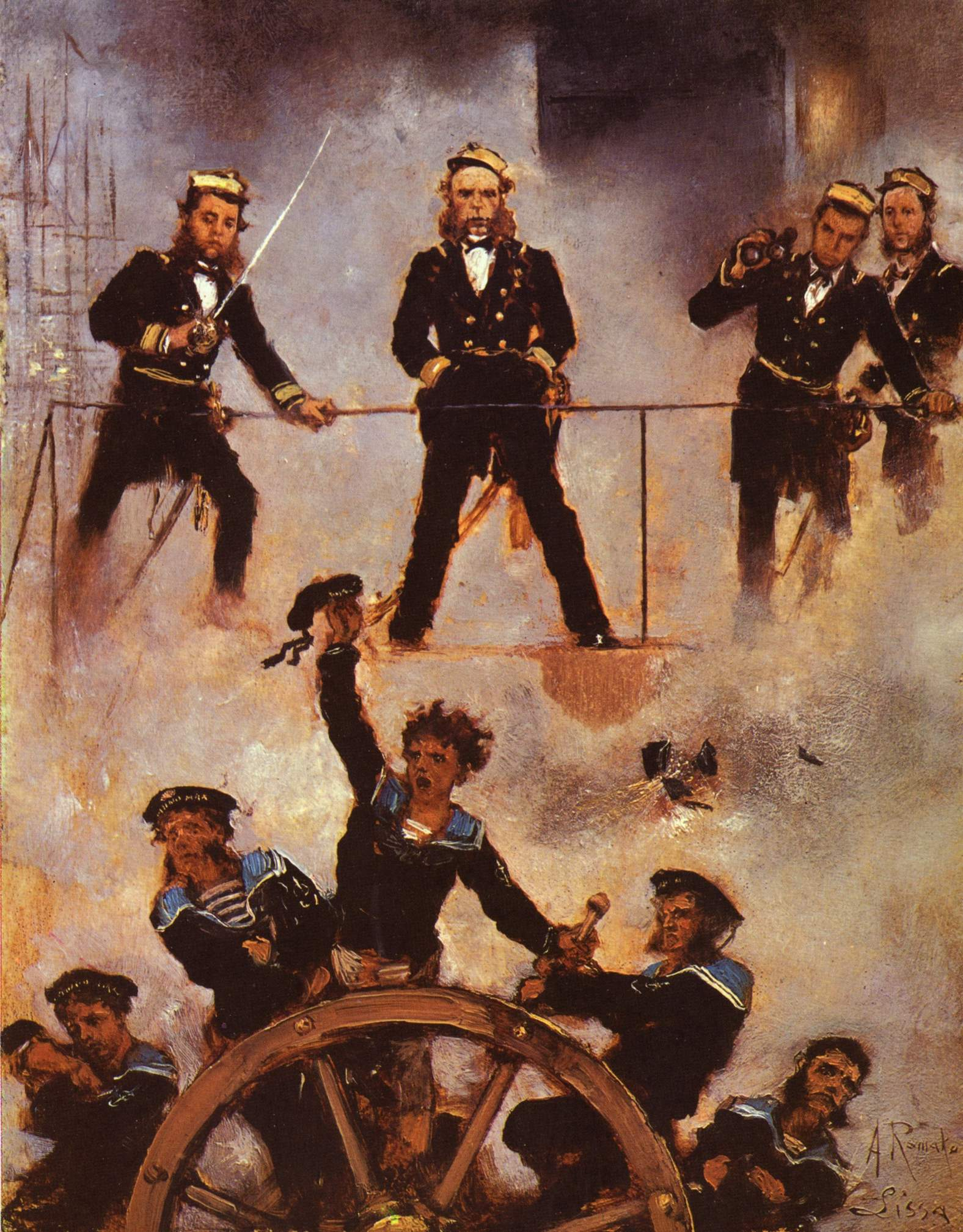
Admiral Tegethoff at the 1866 Naval Battle of Lissa by Anton Romako

Several Italian ironclads attempted to capture or sink Kaiser, the largest unarmored Austrian ship in the battle. After the melee had begun, the Italian ships Castelfidardo, Varese, and Principe di Carignano circled around Kaiser, trading broadsides with her. Persano also arrived in Affondatore and unsuccessfully tried to ram Kaiser, but missed and struck only a glancing blow. Shortly thereafter, Kaiser rammed the ironclad Re di Portogallo in an attempt to protect the Austrian unarmored ships Erzherzog Friedrich and Kaiserin Elizabeth. Kaiser also struck a glancing blow, however, and inflicted little damage. Re di Portogallo fired her light guns into the ship in response, starting a fire aboard Kaiser, and killing or wounding a number of Austrian gunners before the warship could break free. Affondatore then made a second, unsuccessful attempt to ram Kaiser. Though she missed with her ram once more, Affondatore did score a hit with one of her guns, badly damaging Kaiser, killing or wounding twenty of her crew. Kaiser responded by firing her guns into Affondatore's deck, badly holing it and starting a fire, while riflemen in her fighting tops shot at Italian sailors. In addition, a shot from Kaiser struck one of Affondatore's turrets, jamming it for the remainder of the battle.

While the melee continued, the Austrian ironclad Don Juan d'Austria initially attempted to follow Tegetthoff in his second pass, but quickly lost contact with Tegetthoff's flagship in the chaos. Italian ironclads surrounded the Austrian ship, forcing the ironclad Kaiser Max to come to her aid. Thereafter, Re di Portogallo and the Austrian ironclads exchanged broadsides for around half an hour before the Austrians engaged Affondatore. The latter scored three hits on Don Juan d'Austria's unarmored bow, but these shots caused little damage. The melee which followed Tegetthoff's second pass was to his advantage, as the Austrian commander wished to rely upon ramming tactics in order to compensate for the Regia Marina's advantage in ironclads and the Imperial Austrian Navy's inferior guns. Indeed, the ensuing melee was so chaotic that the Italian ironclad Regina Maria Pia collided with her sister ship San Martino, damaging the latter's ram bow. The melee further hampered Italian efforts to use their superior numbers against the Austrians when the ironclad Ancona became entangled with the coastal defense ship Varese, allowing a group of Austrian wooden ships to escape the engagement unharmed.

By this time, Palestro was burning badly from her engagement with Drache and from 15 broadsides fired by Kaiser Max, and was soon destroyed by a magazine explosion. Persano broke off the engagement, having lost two ships, and though his squadron still outnumbered the Austrians, he refused to counter-attack with his badly demoralized forces. In addition, the fleet was low on coal and ammunition. The Italian fleet began to withdraw, followed by the Austrians; Tegetthoff, having gotten the better of the action, kept his distance so as not to risk his success. Additionally, the Austrian ships were slower than their Italian counterparts, and so they could not force a second engagement. As night began to fall, the opposing fleets disengaged completely, heading for Ancona and Pola, respectively. In the course of the battle, the Imperial Austrian Navy only suffered 38 killed, compared to the 612 dead among the ranks of the Regia Marina.

==== Aftermath ====
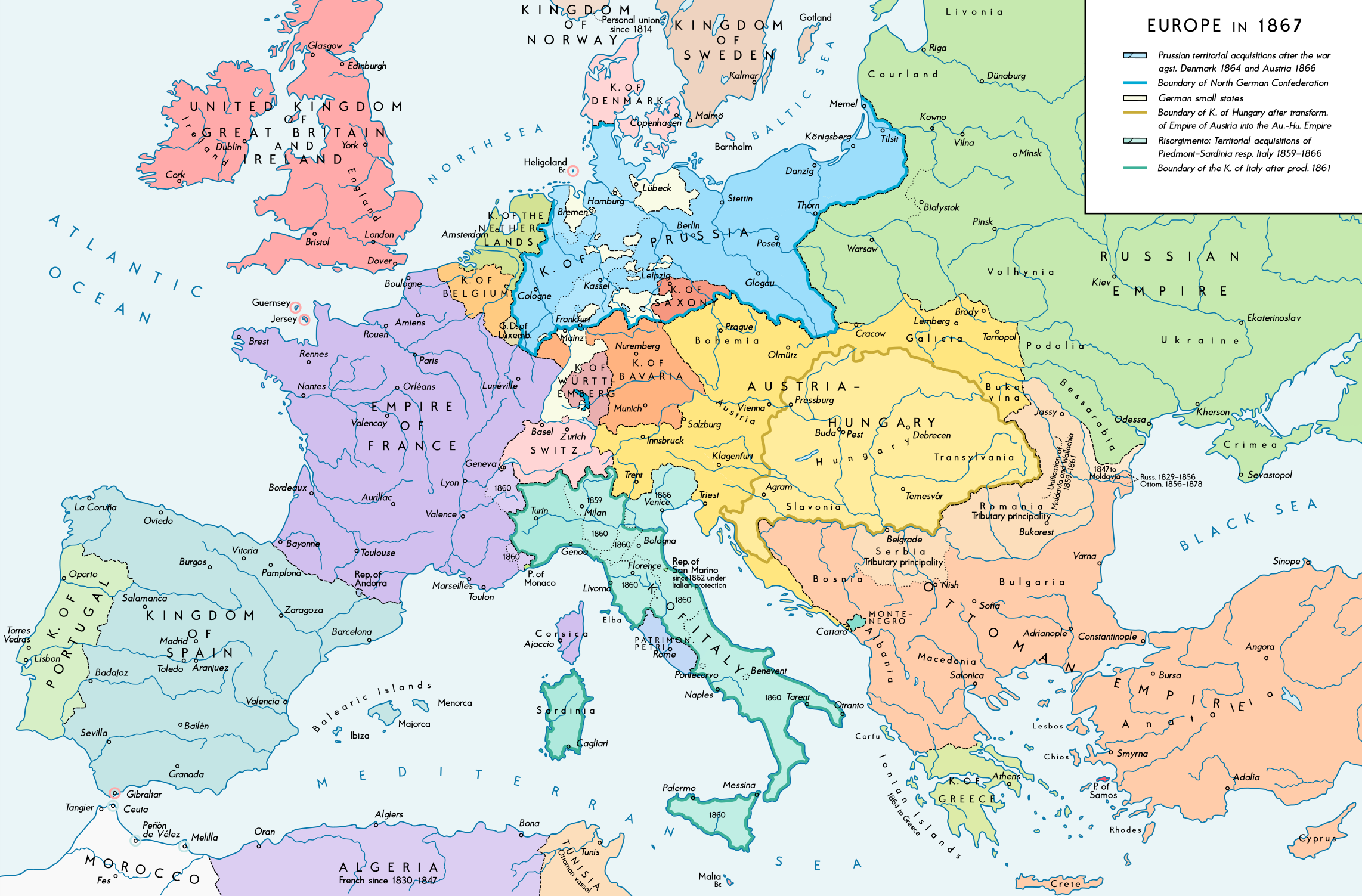
Europe following the conclusion of the Seven Weeks War

The day after the Battle of Lissa, Tegetthoff was promoted by Emperor Franz Joseph I to the rank of vice admiral. Meanwhile, Admiral Persano claimed Lissa was an Italian victory despite the Italians losing two ironclads and failing to sink or capture a single Austrian ship. Shortly after returning to Ancona with his fleet on 21 July however, Persano saw his story fall apart as the truth about the battle's results swiftly turned public opinion about the conduct of the Regia Marina against the Italian commander. As an Italian Senator, Persano saw the Senate of the Kingdom of Italy place him on political trial in April 1867 and ultimately forced the admiral to retire in disgrace.

Despite the Austrian victory at Lissa, the Seven Weeks War would ultimately be decided on land. The decisive Battle of Königgrätz had occurred earlier in the month, resulting in heavy Austrian casualties and signaling Prussia's eventual victory over Austria in the war. Just six days after the Battle of Lissa, Austria and Prussia signed a preliminary peace agreement at Nikolsburg. With Austrian dominance of the Adriatic Sea confirmed, and with reinforcements arriving on the Italian front from Germany, Austria's negotiating position with the Italians improved significantly and Italy was thus forced to sign the Armistice of Cormons on 12 August. Under the terms of the subsequent Treaty of Vienna, signed on 12 October, Italy gained possession of Venetia, but nothing else from the Austrian Empire.

== Post-war effects on the arms race ==
Italian and Austro-Hungarian Ironclad warship construction, 1867–1885
Year	Ship(s)	Year	Ship(s)
1867 (Austria-Hungary)	Lissa	1876 (Austria-Hungary)	Tegetthoff
1869 (Austria-Hungary)	Custoza; Kaiser	1881 (Kingdom of Italy)	Ruggiero di Lauria; Francesco Morosini
1870 (Austria-Hungary)	Erzherzog Albrecht	1882 (Kingdom of Italy)	Andrea Doria
1873 (Kingdom of Italy)	Duilio; Enrico Dandolo	1884 (Kingdom of Italy)	Re Umberto; Sicilia
1874 (Austria-Hungary)	Kaiser Max; Don Juan d'Austria; Prinz Eugen	1884 (Austria-Hungary)	Kronprinz Erzherzog Rudolf; Kronprinzessin Erzherzogin Stephanie
1876 (Kingdom of Italy)	Italia; Lepanto	1885 (Kingdom of Italy)	Sardegna
Key: Kingdom of Italy Austria-Hungary
Note that the dates refer to when ships were laid down.

The Battle of Lissa proved to be the climax of the Austro-Italian ironclad arms race, though the naval competition between the two nations would continue for another 16 years. Following the signing of the Treaty of Vienna, Austria was diplomatically isolated which caused a considerable amount of uncertainty over the future of its naval forces. Tegetthoff however was widely praised for his performance at Lissa. In addition to being promoted and receiving the Military Order of Maria Theresa on behalf of the Austrian Empire, Emperor Maximilian I of Mexico, who had overseen the construction of Austria's entire ironclad fleet as Archduke Ferdinand Max, congratulated Tegetthoff for his victory and awarded the Austrian vice admiral the Grand Cross of the Imperial Order of Our Lady of Guadalupe, the highest Imperial Order that could be bestowed by the Mexican emperor.

Despite its relatively limited impact on the outcome of the Seven Weeks War, the Battle of Lissa would prove to have a major impact on the development of naval warfare for the next 60 years. As the first naval engagement between multiple armored warships in history, the Battle of Lissa would be the largest fleet engagement to occur in the century between the Battle of Trafalgar and the Battle of Tsushima. Most of the world's major navies adopted Tegetthoff's ramming tactics and subsequently incorporated ram bows onto warships well into the 1920s.

=== Decline of the Regia Marina ===
In the years after the Battle of Lissa, the Regia Marina fell into an era of steep decline. Having already having overspent its naval budgets by millions of lira in the years before Lissa, the Regia Marina saw its budget cut throughout the 1860s and 1870s. With Austrian control over the Adriatic Sea solidified following the Seven Weeks War, it entered the post-war era in a state of political and financial disarray as most of the Regia Marina's leadership, including Persano, had been disgraced by the Battle of Lissa and the failure to achieve any naval gains in the Adriatic.

In the autumn of 1867, Menabrea, who had previously been the primary objector to the construction of Italy's ironclad battle fleet after Cavour's death in 1861, came to power as prime minister of Italy. Meanbrea continued his record of opposing ironclad warships and scrapped all plans to construct new ships which had not already been ordered shortly after taking office. These events caused construction of new ironclad warships to come to a halt after the competition of the Principe Amedeo class. Italy did not lay down another ironclad until 1873.

=== Establishment of the Austro-Hungarian Navy ===
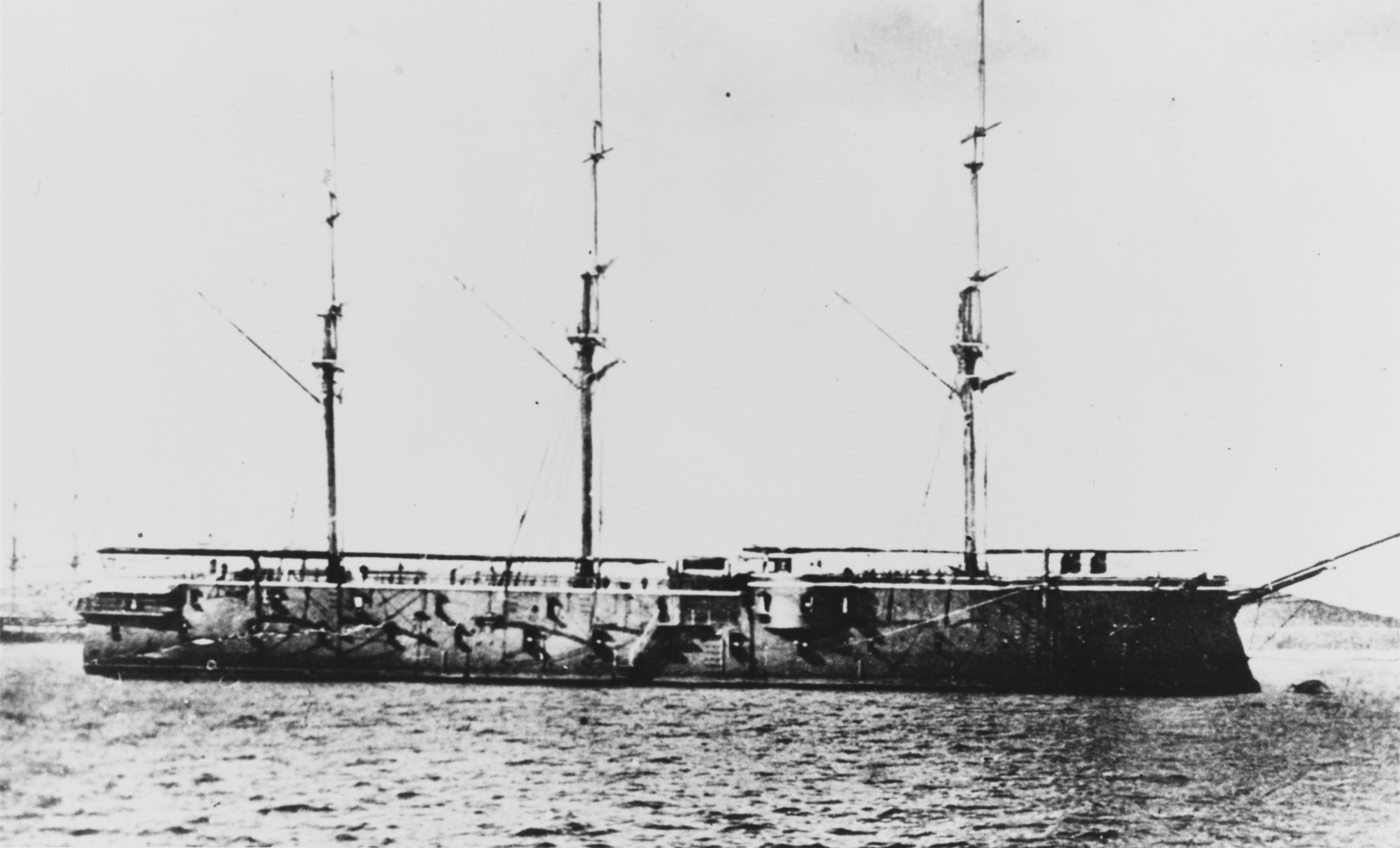
Lissa, the first Austro-Hungarian ironclad constructed after the Ausgleich and named after the Austrian victory at the Battle of Lissa

Austria's defeat in the Seven Weeks War forced Austria to determine a new set of foreign and domestic policies for the future, as Austria's interests since the days of the Holy Roman Empire had primarily been found in Italy and Germany. The Empire thus reformed itself into the Austro-Hungarian Empire following the adoption of the Austro-Hungarian Compromise of 1867 (German: Ausgleich), which re-established the sovereignty of the Kingdom of Hungary and placed Hungarians within the empire on an equal footing with Austrians. Under the Ausgleich, Emperor Franz Joseph I would be crowned as King of Hungary, while a separate parliament at Pest with powers to enact laws for the lands of the Holy Crown of Hungary would be established.

From 1867 onwards, the abbreviations heading the names of official institutions in Austria-Hungary reflected their responsibility: k. u. k. (German: kaiserlich und königlich or Imperial and Royal) was the label for institutions common to both parts of the Monarchy. This meant that following the transformation of the Austrian Empire into the Austro-Hungarian Empire, the Imperial Austrian Navy was itself reformed into the Imperial and Royal Navy (German: kaiserliche und königliche Kriegsmarine), though the navy was commonly referred to either as the "k.u.k. Kriegsmarine" or simply the "Austro-Hungarian Navy".

Seizing upon the decline of the Regia Marina in the years immediately after the Battle of Lissa, Tegetthoff worked to continue the efforts of Archduke Ferdinand Max of expanding the ironclad fleet of the now Austro-Hungarian Navy. Tegetthoff found political allies in the Austro-Hungarian Minister of War Carl von Franck and retired Admiral Bernhard von Wüllerstorf-Urbair. Wüllerstorf's and Franck's primary arguments in favor of continuing with the ironclad program Austria had engaged in prior to the Seven Weeks War lay largely along economic grounds. The two believed that constructing new ironclad warships would rejuvenate Austria-Hungary's economy following the defeat at the hands of Prussia and Italy, and that such a fleet would help to open up new commercial opportunities in the Levant and the Middle East. These proposals would be shelved however while Austria-Hungary continued to reel from the military defeats inflicted by Prussia, and several cabinet reshufflings by Emperor Franz Joseph I resulted in a government more interested in pursuing revenge against Prussia than constructing new ironclads, which would be of little use in a hypothetical second war with Prussia.

Nevertheless, in the first budget passed following the Ausgleich, funds were appropriated to renovate and upgrade Austria-Hungary's oldest ironclads, Drache and Salamander. Additional funds were set aside to re-arm the entire fleet with new RML 7-inch (178 mm) guns from the United Kingdom. Furthermore, the first post-war ironclad of the Austro-Hungary Navy, Lissa, was laid down at the Stabilimento Tecnico Triestino shipyard in San Marco in June 1867. As part of the post-Ausgleich reforms, Austria-Hungary attempted to court France and Italy as potential allies to curb future Prussian expansion. This potential alliance and a re-orientation of Austro-Hungarian foreign policy back towards Germany threatened the development of the Austro-Hungarian Navy and thus the construction of additional ironclads, though the talks ultimately failed after France and Italy could not agree on the Roman Question.

=== The Tegetthoff Era: 1868–1871 ===
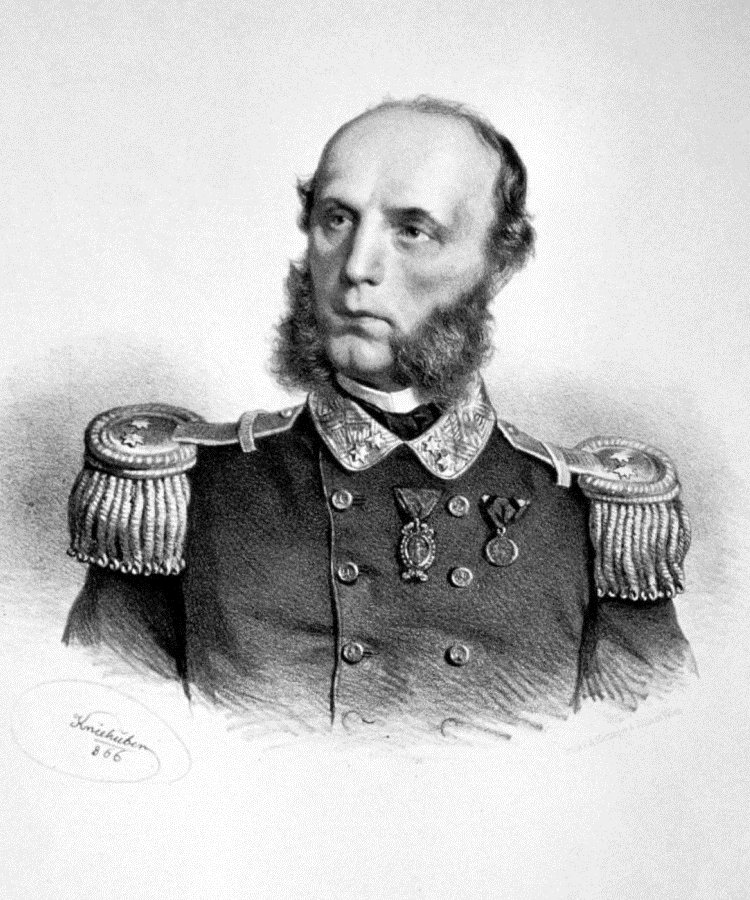
Wilhelm von Tegetthoff, Austrian commander at the Battle of Lissa and Marinekommandant of the Austro-Hungarian Navy following the Seven Weeks War

Tegetthoff was appointed Chief of the Naval Section of the War Ministry and appointed to the post of Marinekommandant in early 1868, making him the operational and political head of the Austro-Hungarian Navy. He quickly went to work reforming the operation, structure, and regulations which governed the Austro-Hungarian Navy. As part of this broad series of reforms, Tegetthoff also began work drafting the first battle fleet proposal the navy had seen since Ferdinand Max's proposal in 1858. While the 1868 budget had included funds which would eventually be used to convert the ship-of-the-line Kaiser into an ironclad casemate ship, Tegetthoff had far more ambitious plans. In September 1868, the Marinekommandant outlined his proposal to Emperor Franz Joseph I. The plan called for a massive reinvestment in Austria-Hungary's ironclad fleet, with the eventual goal of some 15 ironclad warships, and an additional 19 unarmored warships of various types. Tegetthoff intended for the ironclad fleet to be the backbone of the Austro-Hungarian Navy, securing its influence in the Adriatic and even Mediterranean Seas. As the Regia Marina was still recovering from the political chaos which gripped its ranks after the defeat at Lissa two years earlier, this proposal presented the opportunity for Austria-Hungary to finally secure naval dominance over its Italian counterpart and put an end to the ironclad arms race which the two nations had been engaged in since 1860. Tegetthoff's plan was the most expensive proposal ever submitted on behalf of the navy up to that point in time, with a final cost of 25,300,000 Florin, and construction on the ironclads would take place over a ten-year period.

Custoza, the first iron-hulled ironclad of the Austro-Hungarian Navy

While Tegetthoff found support for the project from Emperor Franz Joseph I, the Marinekommandant still had to obtain approval from the Austrian and Hungarian Delegations for Common Affairs in order to proceed with the plan. Laying out his proposal to the delegations in December 1868, Tegetthoff won approval to begin proceeding with his plans, with 8,800,000 Florins being devoted to the Austro-Hungarian Navy's 1869 budget. While this was only a slight increase over 1868, the additional funds were enough for the navy to begin construction on two new ironclads, Custoza, and Erzherzog Albrecht. They were the first Austro-Hungarian ironclads to be built after the navy had finished its study of the results of the Battle of Lissa. Once more, Chief Engineer Josef von Romako, who had designed all of the navy's earlier ironclad vessels, was tasked with preparing designs for two new warships. The lessons Romako came away with from the Battle of Lissa lent credibility to the idea that the new ships should favor heavy armor and the capability of end-on fire to allow both ships to be able to effectively attack with their rams. This design change over previous ironclads however required compromises in the number of guns and the power of each ship's machinery; to make up for carrying fewer guns, Romako adopted the same casemate ship design as Lissa. Unlike the wooden-hulled Lissa, however, the hulls of Custoza and Erzherzog Albrecht would be constructed with iron, the first major Austro-Hungarian warships to feature such a design. Custoza was laid down by Stabilimento Tecnico Triestino in Trieste in November 1869, while Erzherzog Albrecht followed in June 1870.

Tegetthoff followed up on this progress with a new proposal for the 1870 budget, which would establish fixed annual budgets similar to the German Naval Laws that German Secretary of State for the Navy, Alfred von Tirpitz, would establish near the turn of the century. This time however, Tegetthoff emerged from the political debates in Vienna and Pest with only a partial victory. While the Austro-Hungarian Navy's 1870 budget was increased to 9,800,000 Florins, the delegations rejected the Marinekommandant's proposal for a fixed naval budget, and no additional funds were allocated for new ironclads. These budgetary restraints would result in Erzherzog Albrecht being built to a slightly smaller design than Custoza. Nevertheless, in the four years since the Battle of Lissa, the Austro-Hungarian Navy had begun work on three new ironclads, and the older ship-of-the-line Kaiser had been converted into a casemate ironclad.

== Developments of the 1870s and 1880s ==
=== Austria-Hungary ===
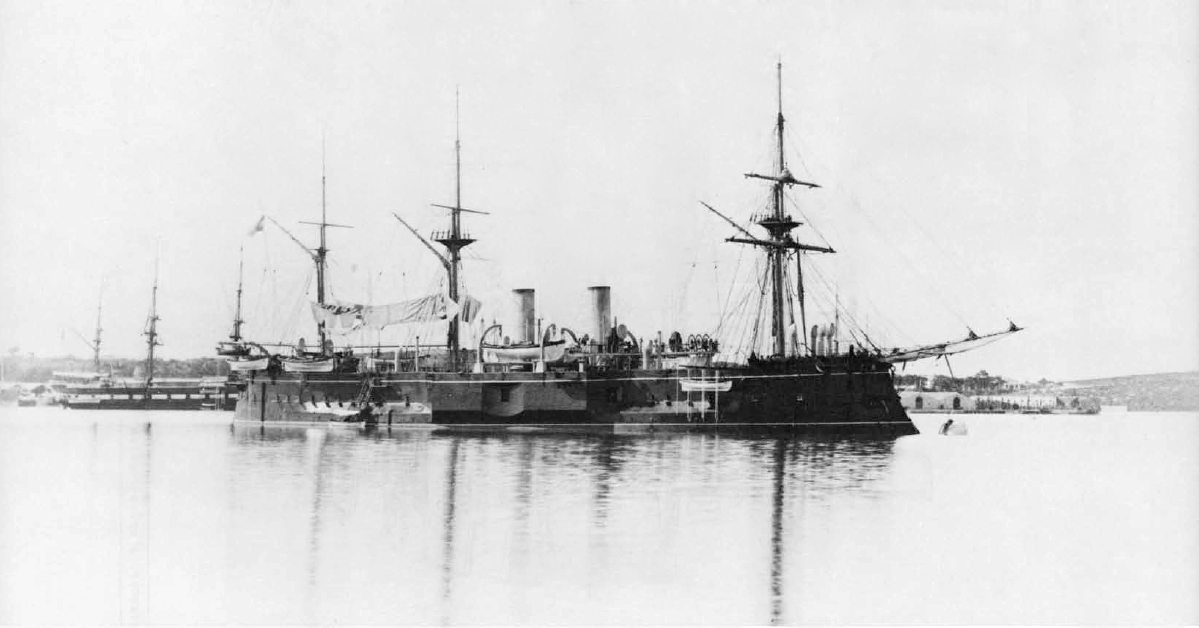
Tegetthoff, one of the last ironclad warships of the Austro-Hungarian Navy

While Tegetthoff spent most of 1870 observing the Franco-Prussian War and securing funds to rush completion of the ironclads already under construction, the new ironclads Austria-Hungary was constructing had begun to bring Tegetthoff close to his ambitious goal of 15 armored warships by 1878. However, after obtaining new funds in January 1871 to speed up the acquisition of the British-made armor plating of Custoza and Erzherzog Albrecht, Tegetthoff's health failed rapidly. Catching pneumonia after walking home in a rainstorm, Tegetthoff died in April 1871. His death would also mark a period of substantial decline for the Austro-Hungarian Navy, as Europe's changing political outlook in the face of the recently concluded Franco-Prussian War, combined with improved Austro-Italian relations in the decade to come, severely undermined future arguments for the expansion of the Austro-Hungarian Navy.

Tegetthoff's successor to the office of Marinekommandant was his old political rival, Friedrich von Pöck. While he commanded the ship-of-the-line Kaiser in the Second Schleswig War, Pöck had been given shore assignments throughout the Seven Weeks War, denying him the same sort of fame and public admiration that Tegetthoff had enjoyed after the Battle of Lissa. Almost immediately after taking office, Pöck faced chronic budgetary problems, owing in large part due to obstructionism from Hungarians and liberal Germans within the Austro-Hungarian government, the former viewing naval matters as an Austrian concern, and the latter opposed to naval expansion in light of the continued deterioration of the Regia Marina following the Battle of Lissa. Additionally, since he was not involved in Tegetthoff's victory at the Battle of Lissa, he lacked the personal prestige to command the respect of the government, which Tegetthoff had successfully used to secure the construction of four ironclads in the four years since the Seven Weeks War. As a result, Pöck had great difficulty securing the funding for new ironclad warships during his tenure.

Pöck finally won approval for a new ironclad, Tegetthoff, in 1875 but he could not convince the delegations to allocate funds for a sister ship he had planned to name Erzherzog Karl. Tegetthoff was laid down in April 1876, the only ironclad to be constructed for the next eight years. Confronted with an unwillingness within the Austro-Hungarian government to strengthen the fleet further, Pöck resorted to subterfuge to acquire the funds he needed. In 1875, he asked for a budget increase to "rebuild" the three elderly Kaiser Max-class ironclads. In fact, Pöck sold the old ships for scrap, reusing only their machinery, armor plates, and other fittings for the construction of three new ships, which were given the same names to obscure his sleight of hand.

Austro-Hungarian Naval Budgets: 1867–1884
(in millions of Florin)

Throughout this period, the navy's annual budget continued to fall, from a peak of 11,100,000 Florins in 1872 to 8,500,000 Florins in 1880. Pöck continued to push for another new ironclad, but by 1880 his efforts were only symbolic: in his proposed budget estimates for the year, he included a new ironclad warship, but did not actually allocate any funds for it. Unable to increase the strength of the ironclad fleet, Pöck turned to less expensive means to defend Austria-Hungary's coastline, including development of naval mines and self-propelled torpedoes. He ordered the first torpedo boat, Torpedoboot I, from Britain in 1875, followed by five more from Britain and four more from domestic shipyards thereafter. In the late 1870s and early 1880s, he also ordered the four torpedo cruisers Zara, Spalato, Sebenico, and Lussin.

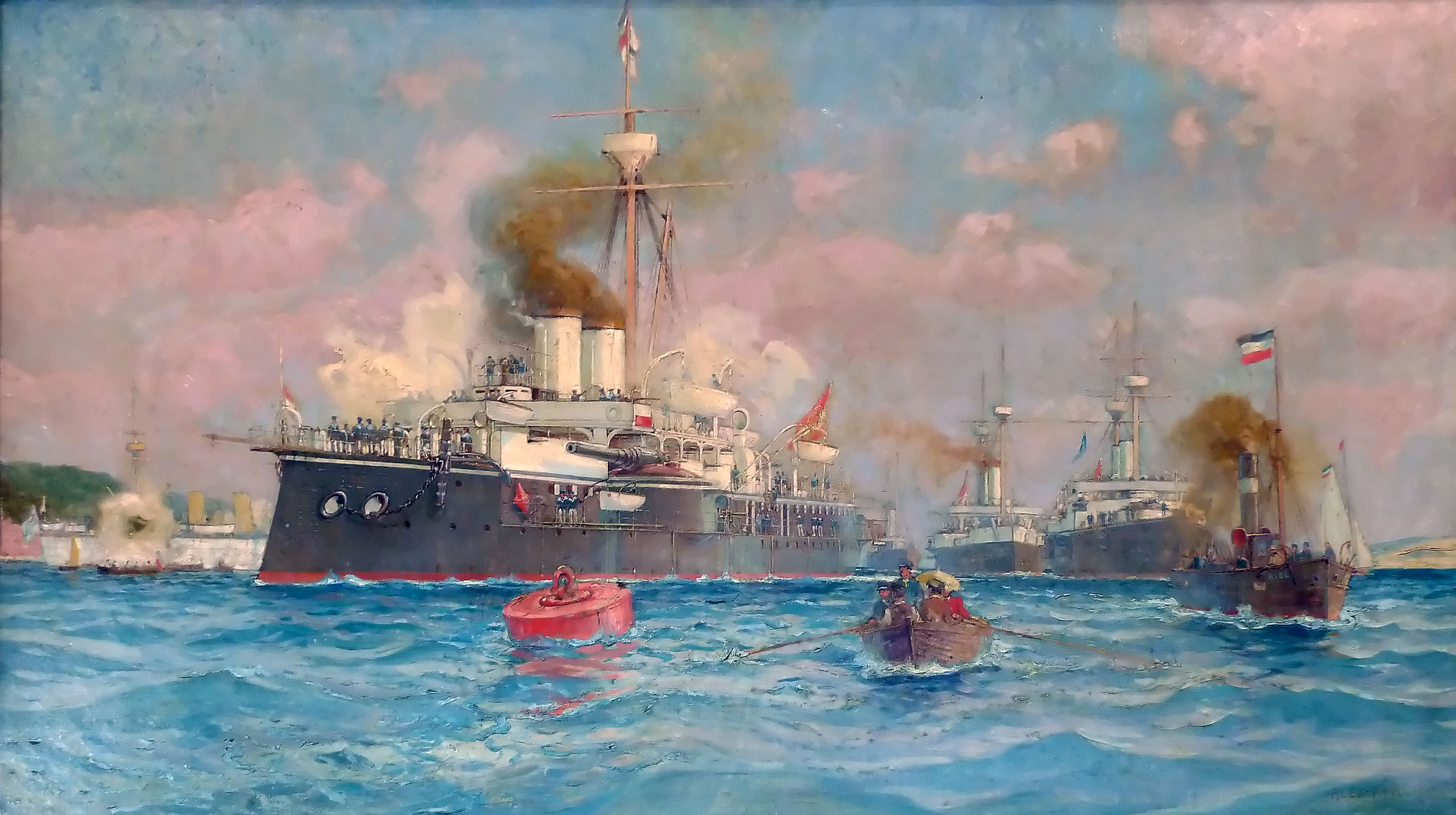
A painting by Alexander Kircher depicting the final two Austro-Hungarian ironclads, Kronprinz Erzherzog Rudolf and Kronprinzessin Erzherzogin Stephanie in Kiel in 1890

These new orders marked not only a change in Austro-Hungarian naval policy, but also the end of the Empire's participation in the ironclad arms race, though two final ironclads would be built in 1884. Pöck succeeded in securing funding for the first of these two ships in 1881, having obtained authorization for Kronprinz Erzherzog Rudolf to replace the aging ironclad Salamander. The design for the new ship was prepared by Josef Kuchinka, the Director of Naval Construction and Romako's successor to the post. Kronprinz Erzherzog Rudolf was laid down in January 1884.

A second ironclad and Austria-Hungary's last, Kronprinzessin Erzherzogin Stephanie, was authorized shortly thereafter by Pöck's successor, Maximilian Daublebsky von Sterneck. Sterneck ultimately had to resort to the same budgetary tricks employed earlier by Pöck in order to construct Kronprinzessin Erzherzogin Stephanie. She was laid down in November 1884 using funds that had been allocated to modernize the ironclad Erzherzog Ferdinand Max. Sterneck attempted to conceal the deception by referring to the ship officially as Ferdinand Max, though the actual Ferdinand Max was still anchored in Pola as a school ship. Eventually the fait accompli of the ironclad's construction was accepted by the delegations and the new ship was commissioned under the name Kronprinzessin Erzherzogin Stephanie in July 1889. After the construction of these two final ironclads, nearly another decade would pass before the Austro-Hungarian Navy secured funding for new capital ships, the three Monarch-class coastal defense ships begun in 1893.

=== Italy ===
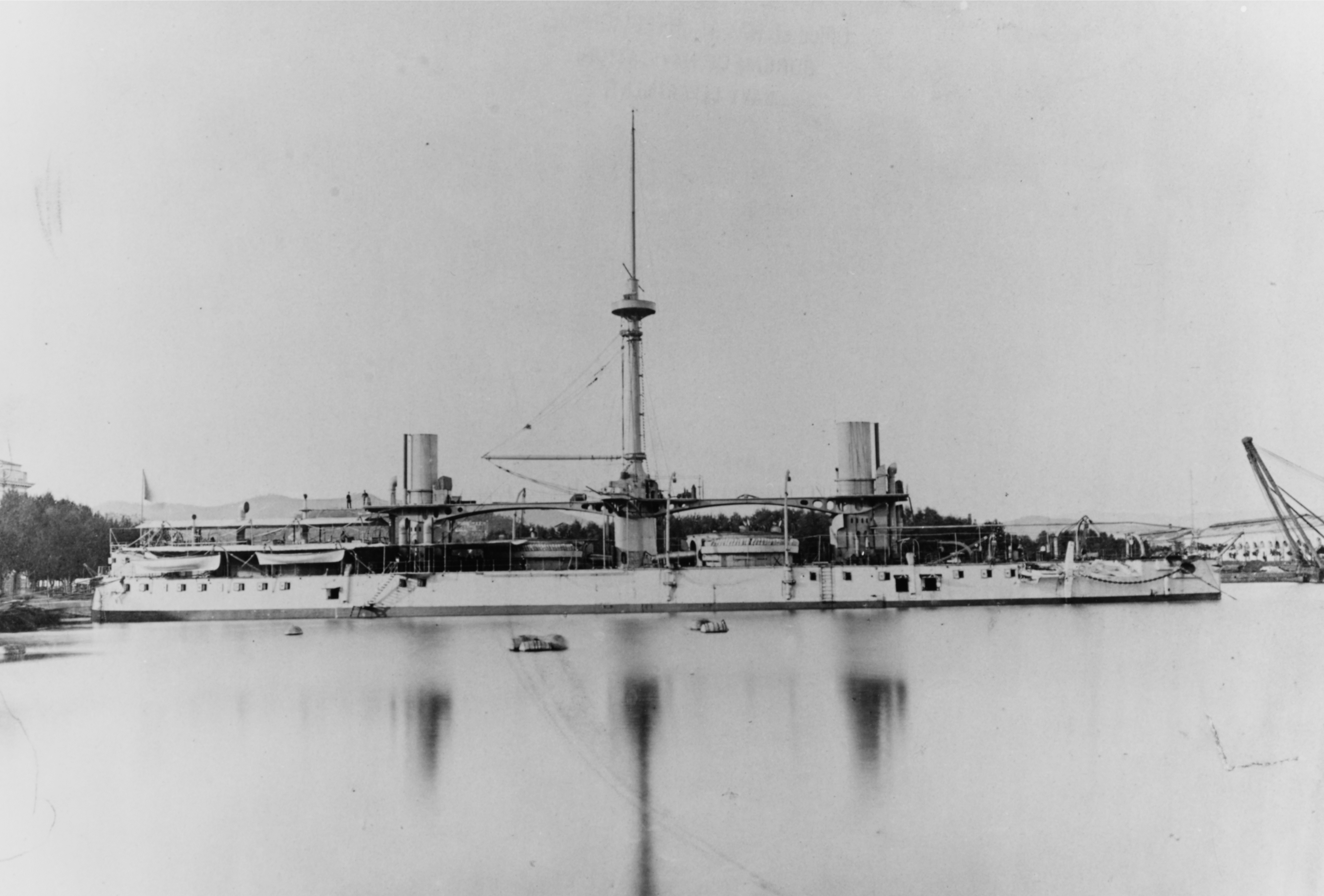
The Italian ironclad Duilio, shortly before her completion in 1880

Italy's defeat at the Battle of Lissa continued to inhibit naval expansion in the 1870s. A naval commission convened in 1871 concluded that the Regia Marina's capabilities in the Adriatic and Mediterranean were so poor in comparison to Italy's neighbors that future Italian naval policy should be oriented more towards coastal defense than constructing a powerful battle fleet. The commission's findings recommended future funds should be diverted away from further ironclads and towards establishing over 30 coastal forts instead. These findings resulted in the Italy's 1871 naval budget being cut to 26,800,000 lira, the lowest amount ever afforded to the Regia Marina in the years after Lissa. Incidentally, the 1871 budget would also mark the only time in history where the Regia Marina received less funds than the Austro-Hungarian Navy. The 1871 budget would signal the nadir of Italian naval fortunes however, as subsequent budgets would slowly rise throughout the 1870s as newly appointed naval engineer Benedetto Brin worked to rebuild the Regia Marina.

Brin began working on a new design for an Italian ironclad which would begin the transition of naval ships away from ironclads and closer to battleships which would come to dominate the navies of the early 20th century. His initial design rejected the casemate concept which formed the bulk of existing ironclads of the era, and instead built upon the turret ship design which existed in the Italian ironclad Affondatore. This design incorporated an entirely iron and steel-built hull, and centered around four guns placed upon two large turrets. Brin's arguments in favor of constructing a warship of this scale rested upon Italy's diplomatic isolation following the Franco-Prussian War, as Italy had poor relations with both Austria-Hungary and France after failed negotiations to ally with both in the late 1860s. The opening of the Suez Canal in 1869 also greatly increased commercial traffic in the Mediterranean, which promised to grow the Italian economy and merchant marine in the coming years. A new fleet of ships would thus be necessary to protect Italian interests in the Mediterranean. Brin eventually obtained political support in the Chamber of Deputies for the construction of two ships built to his design. These two ships would go on to become the Duilio-class ironclads: Duilio and Enrico Dandolo. Both ships were laid down in January 1873, with Duilio being constructed at the Regio Cantiere di Castellammare di Stabia shipyard in Castellammare di Stabia, and her sister ship Enrico Dandolo at the Arsenale di La Spezia. The four 17.7 in (450 mm) guns of each ship, as well as their engines, were constructed in the United Kingdom and imported, which raised the cost of the already expensive warships.

Italian Naval Budgets: 1874–1880
(in millions of Florin)

Before either of these ships were even launched however, the Chamber of Deputies agreed to the construction of two additional ironclads to accompany the Duilio class. The Italia-class ironclads would prove to be among the largest ironclad warships in the world at the time of their commissioning. The Italia class consisted of the ironclads Italia and Lepanto. Both ships were designed by Brin, who chose to discard traditional ironclad belt armor entirely, relying instead on a combination of very high speed and extensive internal subdivision to protect the ships.

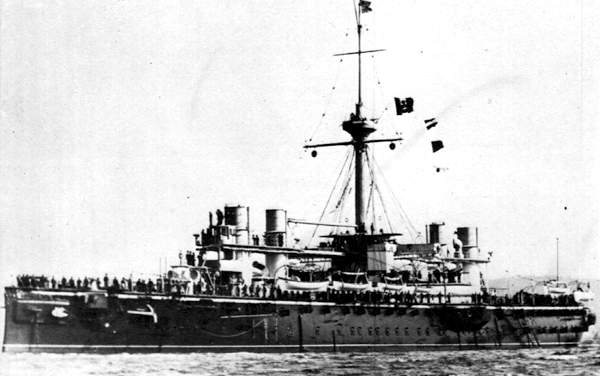
The Italian ironclad Leponto at La Spezia

As the second class in Italy's new warship program designed to give the Regia Marina favorable numbers over the Austro-Hungarian Navy, the Italia class not only presented Italy's desire to rebuild its naval power following the Battle of Lissa, but it also signaled an era of changing technology which would soon put the ironclad arms race between Italy and Austria-Hungary, and indeed the ironclad itself, to an end. The design of the Italia class, such as their speed, light armor, and armament of very large 17-inch (430 mm) guns, has led some naval historians to refer to the Italia class as prototypical battlecruisers, blurring the lines between "ironclads" and the future warships which would come to dominate the early 20th century. Italia was laid down at Regio Cantiere di Castellammare di Stabia in January 1876, while Cantiere navale fratelli Orlando began construction on Lepanto in November that same year.

After his success with designing and obtaining the necessary money to construct the Duilio and Italia-class ironclads, Brin was appointed Italian Minister of the Navy in March 1876. After taking office, he began drawing up plans for a major fleet expansion, the largest in Italian history. Brin envisioned a modern Regia Marina of 16 ironclads, 10 cruisers, and 46 smaller warships. The project would take a decade to implement and cost 146 million lira. Brin obtained the support of King Victor Emmanuel II for the plan in November 1876, and nine months later the Chamber of Deputies approved the package, including multiple internal reforms within the Regia Marina designed to save money for the implementation of Brin's plan, including the decommissioning and scrapping of several older warships. By the time Italia was commissioned into the Regia Marina in October 1885, all three ships of the Principe di Carignano class, as well as the ironclad Re di Portogallo, had either been broken up or decommissioned.

== End of the arms race ==
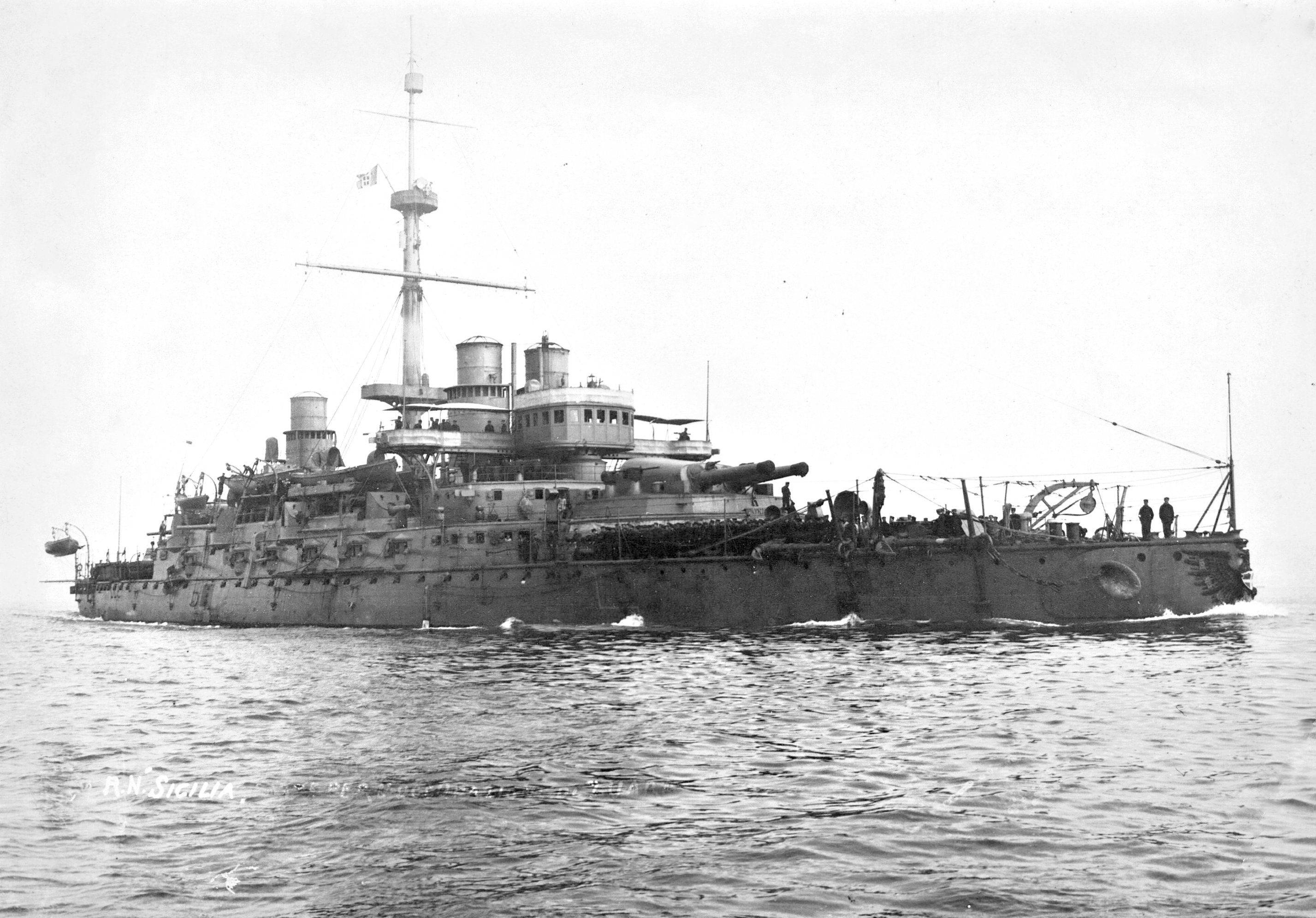
Sicilia, one of the last ironclad warships of the Regia Marina

Political and technological developments throughout the 1870s and 1880s would ultimately bring the naval arms race, which Austria-Hungary and Italy had been engaged in for roughly 20 years, to a close. The primary political and technological drivers of this would be the signing of the Triple Alliance in 1882, and the emergence of the pre-dreadnought battleship.

Italy would construct two more classes of ironclads, the Ruggiero di Lauria class and the Re Umberto class. However, by the time Ruggiero di Lauria, the first ship of her namesake class, was laid down by Regio Cantiere di Castellammare di Stabia on 3 August 1881, the ironclad arms race between Italy and Austria-Hungary was coming to an end. The completion of Sardegna in February 1895, the final ironclad of the Regia Marina, gave Italy the third largest navy in the world, behind only the United Kingdom and France. Despite this, by the time the final ships of the Re Umberto class had been completed, the United Kingdom had already begun building the Royal Sovereign-class battleships, the first pre-dreadnought battleships, which rendered older ironclad battleships obsolete. In addition, technological progress, particularly in armor production techniques—first Harvey armor and then Krupp armor—contributed to the ships' rapid obsolescence.

=== Emergence of the battleship ===
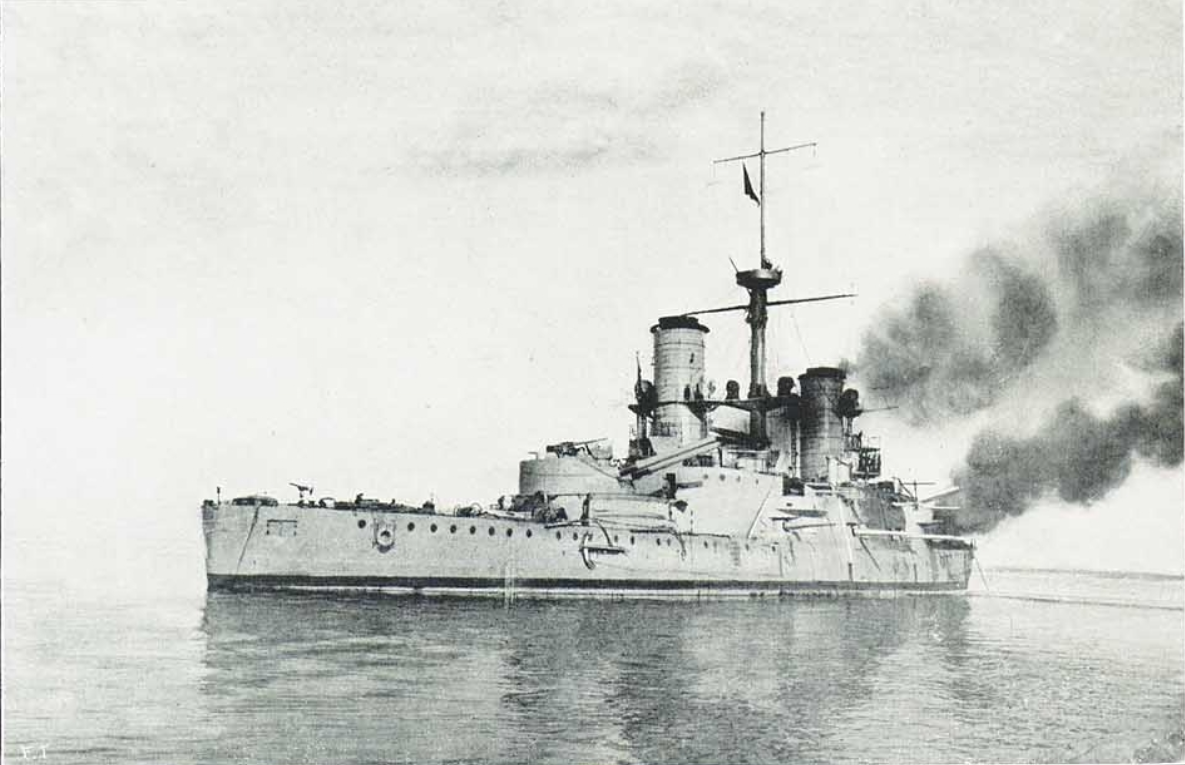
The pre-dreadnought Italian battleship Emanuele Filiberto

By the 1880s, the concept of the ironclad was giving way to that of the battleship. This decade marked the beginning of the era of the "Pre-dreadnought battleship", sea-going battleships built between the mid- to late 1880s and 1905. The distinction however between the era of the ironclad and the era of the pre-dreadnought is blurred by the fact that ironclad designs evolved into battleships over time. This can be seen in the outline of the last ironclads built by Austria-Hungary and Italy, which when contrasted with each nation's oldest ironclads, illustrate major differences in design and construction. The ironclads and pre-dreadnoughts of the 1870s and 1880s were largely built from steel, and protected by hardened steel armor, as opposed to the iron plating and casemate designs of older ironclads. The distinctions between later ironclads and pre-dreadnought battleships can also be found in the armament and propulsion systems of each ship. Pre-dreadnoughts carried a main battery of very heavy guns in barbettes in either open or armored gunhouses which were supported by one or more secondary batteries of smaller guns. They were also powered by coal-fuelled triple-expansion steam engines.

The distinction between ironclads and pre-dreadnought battleships became blurred in foreign navies outside of Italy and Austria-Hungary as well, most notably in the British Royal Navy with the Admiral class, ordered in 1880. These ships reflected developments in ironclad design, being protected by iron-and-steel compound armor rather than wrought iron. Equipped with 12–16-inch (305–406 mm) breech-loading guns, the Admirals continued the trend of ironclad warships towards gigantic weapons. The guns were mounted in open barbettes to save weight. Some historians see these ships as a vital step towards pre-dreadnoughts; others view them as a confused and unsuccessful design.

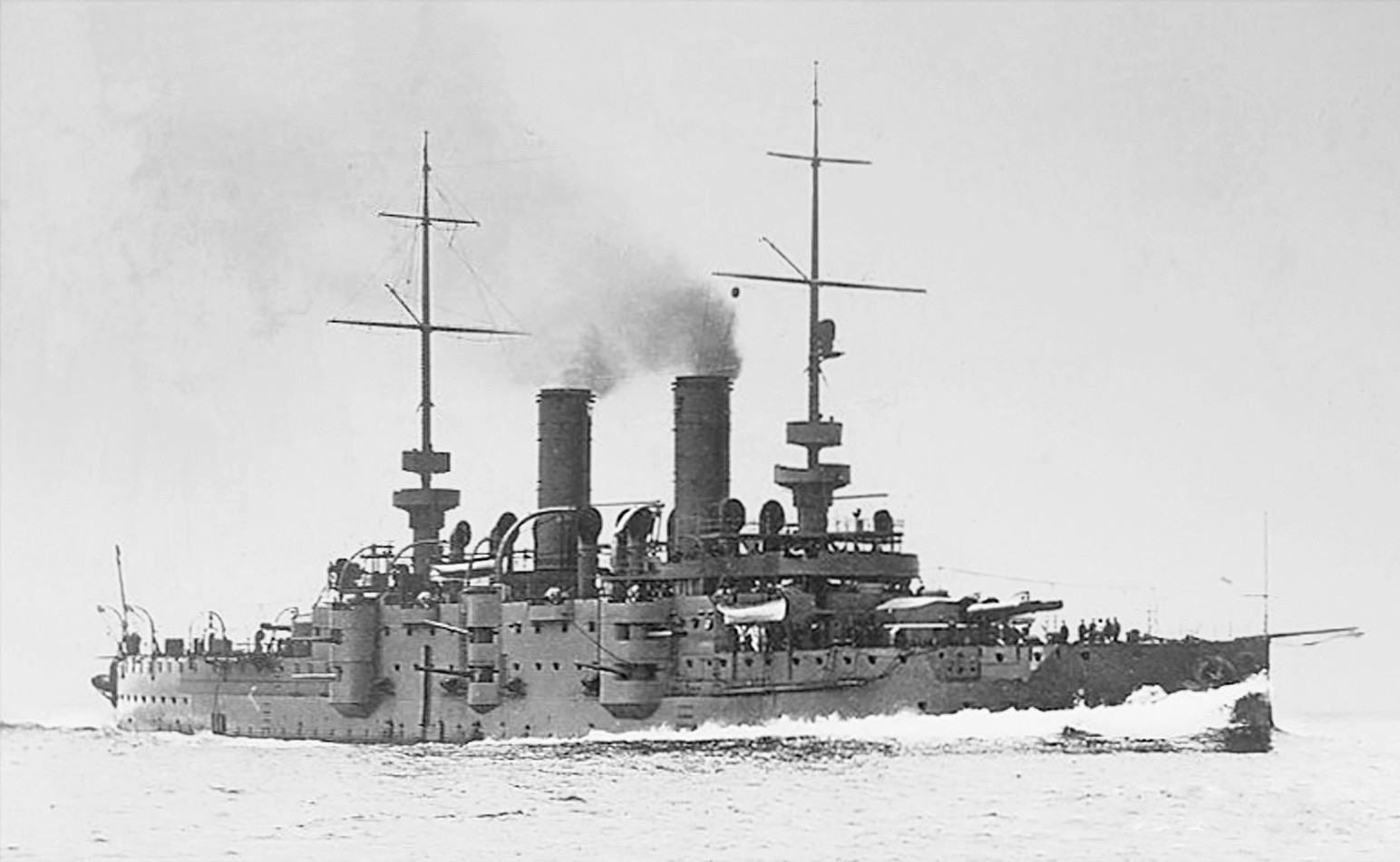
The pre-dreadnought Austro-Hungarian battleship Habsburg

In contrast to the chaotic development of ironclad warships in preceding decades, the 1890s saw navies worldwide start to build battleships to a common design as dozens of ships essentially followed the design of the British Majestic class. The similarity in appearance of battleships in the 1890s was underlined by the increasing number of ships being built. New naval powers such as Germany, Japan, the United States, and Italy and Austria-Hungary, began to establish themselves with fleets of pre-dreadnoughts, while the navies of the United Kingdom, France, and Russia expanded to meet these new threats. The decisive clash of pre-dreadnought fleets was between the Imperial Russian Navy and the Imperial Japanese Navy during the Battle of Tsushima in 1905.

The pre-dreadnoughts themselves would later be made obsolete by the arrival of HMS Dreadnought in 1906. Dreadnought followed the trend in battleship design to heavier, longer-ranged guns by adopting an "all-big-gun" armament scheme of ten 12-inch guns. Her innovative steam turbine engines also made her faster. The existing pre-dreadnoughts were decisively outclassed, and new and more powerful battleships were from then on known as dreadnoughts while the ships that had been laid down before were designated as pre-dreadnoughts.

=== The Triple Alliance of 1882 ===
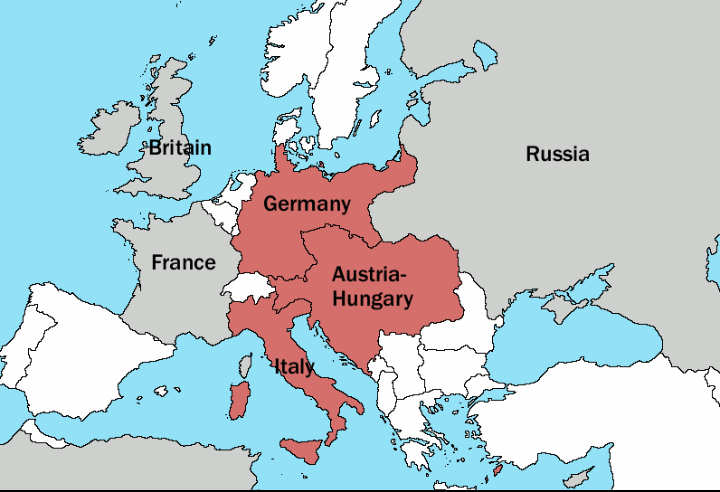
The Triple Alliance in 1913. The Triple Entente is shaded in grey.

The changing nature of political alliances in the 1880s also spelled the end of the arms race. For 20 years, both Italy and Austria-Hungary had used the threat of the other to justify engaging in constructing and purchasing numerous ironclad warships. However, following the first dissolution of the League of the Three Emperors in 1878, Austro-Hungarian Foreign Minister Baron Heinrich Karl von Haymerle began negotiations with Rome to improve relations between Italy and Austria-Hungary. Pöck argued strongly against improving relations with Italy, recognizing that a friendly Italy would effectively render all arguments for a sea-going Austro-Hungarian Navy largely pointless. Nevertheless, Italian foreign policy views since the 1860s had altered considerably, and Italy's attention had since turned away from Tyrol and Trieste and instead towards North Africa. In an attempt to redirect Italian territorial ambitions away from Austria-Hungary, Haymerle encouraged Italian claims on Tunis, and promised Austria-Hungary's diplomatic support for Italian colonial plans in North Africa in exchange for Italian guarantees to respect Austro-Hungarian influence in the Balkans.

Italy was further distracted from Austria-Hungary and the naval arms race between the two nations when France established a protectorate over Tunisia in May 1881. Italy had coveted the Beylik of Tunis as part of its own colonial ambitions. Anti-French sentiment subsequently gripped the Italian public, press, and politicians, but lacking any allies, Italy was powerless to stop the incorporation of Tunisia into the French colonial empire. As a result, Austro-Hungarian attempts to improve relations with Italy began to be warmly received in Rome, eventually leading to a visit to Vienna by King Umberto I in October 1881. This was followed up with the signing of the Triple Alliance between Italy, Austria-Hungary, and Germany in May 1882.

=== Aftermath ===
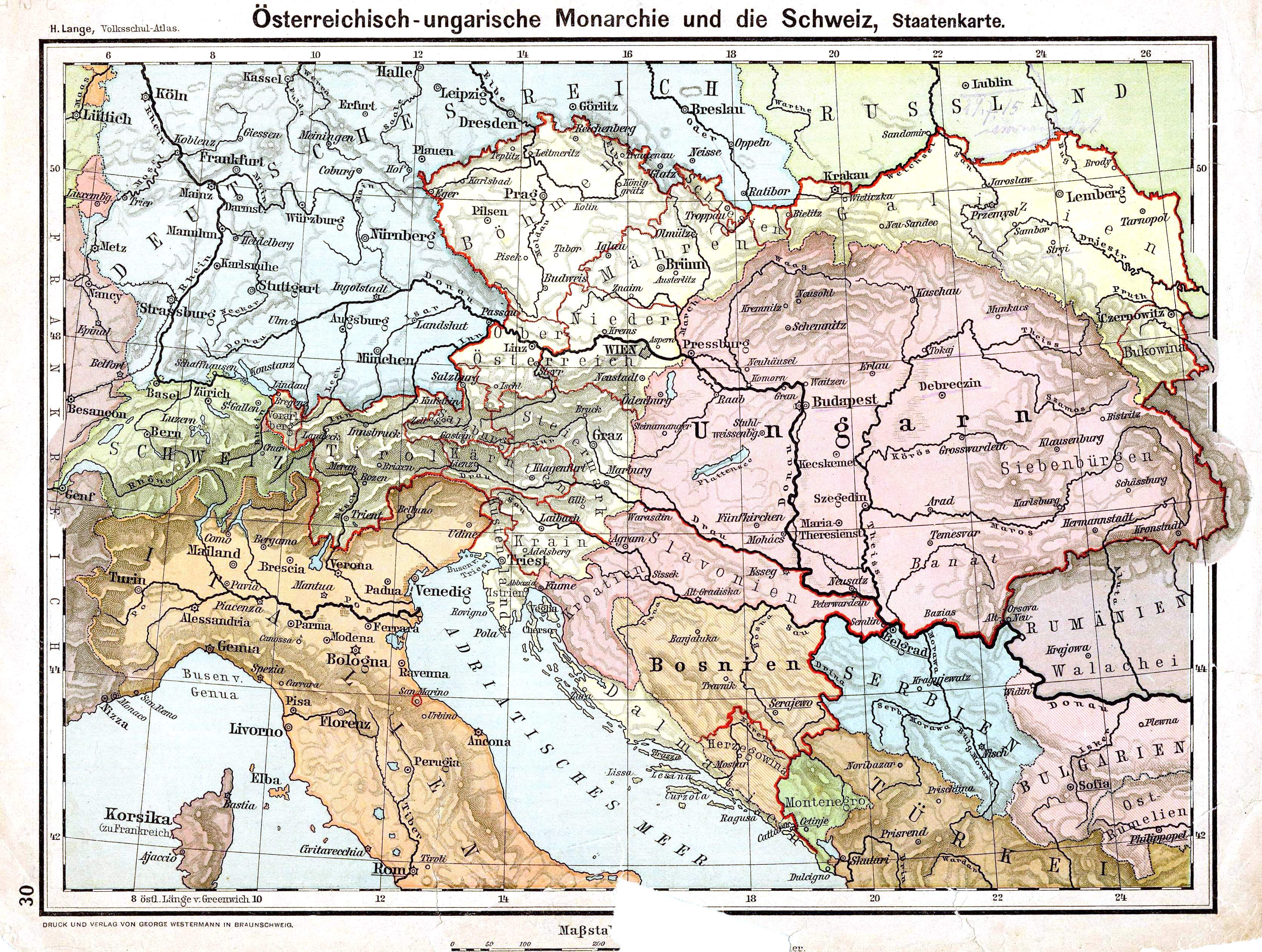
A map of Austria-Hungary and Italy in 1899, with the Adriatic Sea lying between them

Italy would continue to build up its naval force in the years after the signing of the Triple Alliance, but the terms of the treaty led Italy to concede the Adriatic Sea to the interests of Austria-Hungary. Instead, Italian naval plans were redirected towards France. Brin's naval program thus went forward within the Regia Marina, but Italian attentions were redirected to the Western Mediterranean and Tyrrhenian Sea. For Austria-Hungary, the Triple Alliance ended the threat of Italian irridentism aimed at many of its coastal possessions, gave the Empire a relatively free hand in the Adriatic, and protected two of Austria-Hungary's land borders in the event of a war with Russia. However, the results of the alliance would prove to be disastrous for the Austro-Hungarian Navy. The lack of a strong potential opponent determined to contest the Adriatic Sea eliminated most arguments in favor of a large fleet. Indeed, it would not be until 1893 before the Austro-Hungarian Navy would construct another class of capital ships.

Even after Italy and Austria-Hungary became allies under the Triple Alliance however, mutual suspicions and areas of conflict remained between both nations. Italy would go on to improve its relations with France after 1902, negating one of the key issues which led to it joining the Triple Alliance in the first place. Furthermore, enduring nationalism among Italians within Austria-Hungary, and Italian irredentist claims of important Austrian territories, such as Tyrol and Trieste, continued to concern Austria-Hungary. Likewise, Italy grew worried at the naval expansion Austria-Hungary engaged in at the onset of the 20th century, particularly under Marinekommandant Hermann von Spaun and later under Rudolf Montecuccoli. These trends would spark a second naval arms race centered around the construction of battleships at the turn of the century, which would later intensify considerably in the years leading up to World War I.

== See also ==
- List of ironclad warships of Austria-Hungary
- List of ironclad warships of Italy
- International relations (1814–1919)
- Anglo-German naval arms race
- South American dreadnought race
- Argentine–Chilean naval arms race
