= List of shipwrecks in June 1879 =

Ships sunk, foundered, grounded, or otherwise lost during June 1879

The list of shipwrecks in June 1879 includes ships sunk, foundered, grounded, or otherwise lost during June 1879.

== 1 June ==
List of shipwrecks: 1 June 1879
Ship	State	Description
Clan Gordon	United Kingdom	The steamship ran aground near Trincomalee, Ceylon. She was on a voyage from Akyab, Burma to Malta.
Cyrene	United Kingdom	The steamship ran aground at Trincomalee. She was on a voyage from Moulmein, Burma to the English Channel.

== 2 June ==
List of shipwrecks: 2 June 1879
Ship	State	Description
Windau	Russia	The barque ran aground near Halmstad, Sweden. She was refloated and found to be leaky.

== 3 June ==
List of shipwrecks: 3 June 1879
Ship	State	Description
Unnamed	Russia	The lighter sank at Saint Petersburg.
Unnamed	United Kingdom	The brig ran aground in the River Tyne at Pelaw, County Durham and broke her back. She was a total loss.

== 4 June ==
List of shipwrecks: 4 June 1879
Ship	State	Description
Caledonia	United Kingdom	The schooner ran aground between "Livo" and Mørso, Denmark. She was on a voyage from Hartlepool, County Durham to Vestervig, Denmark. She was refloated and taken in to Nykøbing, Denmark in a leaky condition.
Phoenix	New Zealand	The cutter was blown inshore and wrecked at Omaka Bay in the Hauraki Gulf.

== 5 June ==
List of shipwrecks: 5 June 1879
Ship	State	Description
Lake Erie	Unknown	The 27-ton schooner stranded at Andersons Cove, near Mangawhai Harbour, Northland, New Zealand, and became a wreck.
Marie	France	The steamship was driven ashore in a squall at Kronstadt, Russia.

== 7 June ==
List of shipwrecks: 7 June 1879
Ship	State	Description
Cecilia	United Kingdom	The ship was driven ashore and severely damaged between Ryhope and Seaham, County Durham. She was refloated and became waterlogged.
Fawn	United Kingdom	The smack was run down and sunk in the North Sea 5 nautical miles (9.3 km) off Sunderland, County Durham by the steamship Medway (United Kingdom).
Knowsley Hall	United Kingdom	The ship was sighted off Start Point, Devon whilst on a voyage from London to Canterbury, New Zealand. No further trace, reported missing, presumed foundered with the loss of all on board, 65 to 74 lives. She may have been the vessel wrecked on Amsterdam Island with survivors.

== 8 June ==
List of shipwrecks: 8 June 1879
Ship	State	Description
Pearl	New Zealand	The ketch stranded and was wrecked on the coast of Māhia Peninsula, New Zealand in a gale while hauling coal.

== 9 June ==
List of shipwrecks: 9 June 1879
Ship	State	Description
Blonde	United Kingdom	The brigantine was wrecked at Aracaju, Brazil.
Ottercaps	United Kingdom	The steamship sprang a severe leak and put in to Brest, Finistère, France in a sinking condition. She was on a voyage from Bilbao, Spain to Sunderland, County Durham.
Wilhelm	Germany	The ship was driven ashore 6 nautical miles (11 km) west of Dunbar, Lothian, United Kingdom.

== 10 June ==
List of shipwrecks: 10 June 1879
Ship	State	Description
City of New York	United States	The steamship ran aground at Honolulu, Kingdom of Hawaii. She was on a voyage from San Francisco, California to Sydney, New South Wales. She was refloated the next day and resumed her voyage.
Clown	United Kingdom	The yawl was wrecked at Glensannox, Isle of Arran. All on board were rescued.
Enigheden	Norway	The brig was driven ashore at Ossly, Öland, Sweden. She was on a voyage from Riga, Russia to Aarhus, Denmark.
Rockabill	United Kingdom	The steamship was driven ashore on the coast of County Antrim. She was on a voyage from the Clyde to Limerick. She was later refloated and taken in to Glasgow, Renfrewshire for repairs.
Unnamed	United Kingdom	The lighter was destroyed by fire at Blaye, Gironde.

== 11 June ==
List of shipwrecks: 11 June 1879
Ship	State	Description
Baden	United States	The ship was abandoned in the Grand Banks of Newfoundland. Her crew were rescued by the barque China (Germany) and she was set afire. Baden was on a voyage from New Orleans, Louisiana to Liverpool, Lancashire, United Kingdom.
Emilie Marie	France	The ship foundered in St. George's Channel. Her crew got aboard the Cardigan Bay Lightship ( Trinity House), from where they were rescued by the steamship Sunlight (United Kingdom). Emilie was on a voyage from Bilbao, Spain to Glasgow, Renfrewshire, United Kingdom.
Ocean Phantom	United Kingdom	The ship was wrecked in the Saint Lawrence River. Her crew were rescued. She was on a voyage from the River Mersey to Quebec City, Canada.
Sylph	United Kingdom	The yacht collided with the lugger Three Brothers (United Kingdom) and sank off Hastings, Sussex with the loss of four of the five people on board.

== 12 June ==
List of shipwrecks: 12 June 1879
Ship	State	Description
Mary	United Kingdom	The brigantine ran aground on the Boarlands Rock, in the River Fergus and sank.
Unnamed	France	The lighter was destroyed by fire at Bordeaux, Gironde.

== 13 June ==
List of shipwrecks: 13 June 1879
Ship	State	Description
Camilla	United Kingdom	The steamship ran aground at Sulina, United Principalities. She was on a voyage from Brăila, United Principalities to Zakynthos, Greece. She was refloated on 15 June.

== 14 June ==
List of shipwrecks: 14 June 1879
Ship	State	Description
Albula	United Kingdom	The steamship ran aground at Cardiff, Glamorgan. She was on a voyage from Cardiff to Brindisi, Italy. She was refloated with the assistance of a tug and resumed her voyage.
Fred	United Kingdom	The Thames barge was run into by the steamship Britannia (United Kingdom) at Deptford, Kent and was beached with assistance from the tug Alacrity (United Kingdom). She consequently sank.
Pauline David	Denmark	The steamship ran aground in the River Lee upstream of the Blackrock Castle, County Cork, United Kingdom.

== 15 June ==
List of shipwrecks: 15 June 1879
Ship	State	Description
Cleveland	United Kingdom	The ship was driven ashore on Ameland, Friesland, Netherlands. She was on a voyage from Sundsvall, Sweden to London. She was refloated and resumed her voyage.
Modesta	Norway	The brigantine was driven ashore at Dunnose, Isle of Wight, United Kingdom. She was on a voyage from Antwerp, Belgium to Buenos Aires, Argentina. She was refloated with the assistance of a tug and taken in to Cowes, Isle of Wight in a leaky condition.
Pauline David	United Kingdom	The steamship ran aground in the River Lee at the Blackrock Castle, County Cork.
Scot's Craig	United Kingdom	The brig ran aground at Lizard Lighthouse, Cornwall. She was on a voyage from Cárdenas, Cuba to Greenock, Renfrewshire. She was refloated and resumed her voyage.
Sultana	United Kingdom	The cutter was driven ashore in Ballyholme Bay. She was refloated the next day and taken in to Bangor, County Down.

== 16 June ==
List of shipwrecks: 16 June 1879
Ship	State	Description
Goteborg	Sweden	The steamship was driven ashore at Sunderland, County Durham, United Kingdom. She was on a voyage from London to Sunderland. She was refloated the next day with the assistance of two tugs and towed in to Sunderland.

== 17 June ==
List of shipwrecks: 17 June 1879
Ship	State	Description
Ariadne	Denmark	The barque was driven ashore on Gotland, Sweden. She was on a voyage from Riga, Russia to London, United Kingdom. She was refloated and found to be severely leaky. Ariadne was taken in to Copenhagen for repairs.
Carrick	Canada	The brigantine was driven ashore at Bayonne, Loire-Inférieure, France. She was on a voyage from New York, United States to Bayonne.
Chamois	United Kingdom	The steamship collided with the steamship Hettie (United Kingdom) and was beached at "Kadikeni", Ottoman Empire.
Eliza	United Kingdom	The schooner was driven ashore at Fraserburgh, Aberdeenshire. She was refloated.
Germania	Portugal	The barque was driven ashore at Pedra de Sueira, 3 nautical miles (5.6 km) south of Porto. Her crew were rescued. She was on a voyage from New York, United States to Porto. She was a total loss.
Riversdale	United Kingdom	The steamship ran aground on the Nash Sands, in the Bristol Channel off the coast of Glamorgan. She was on a voyage from Cardiff, Glamorgan to Singapore, Straits Settlements. She was refloated and put back to Cardiff for repairs.
Unnamed	United Kingdom	The barge sank at Cardiff.

== 18 June ==
List of shipwrecks: 18 June 1879
Ship	State	Description
Friedrich	Germany	The derelict barque was discovered in the Atlantic Ocean (30°37′N 18°45′W) by the steamship Leibnitz (United Kingdom). She was set afire.
Scythia	United Kingdom	The ship departed from Cardiff, Glamorgan for Payta, Peru. No further trace, presumed foundered with the loss of all 25 crew.

== 19 June ==
List of shipwrecks: 19 June 1879
Ship	State	Description
Annie	United Kingdom	The steamship was driven ashore at Guadiaro, Spain. She was on a voyage from Galaţi, United Principalities to Falmouth, Cornwall. She was refloated and taken in to Gibraltar.
Champion	United Kingdom	The fishing smack collided with the tug North Star (United Kingdom) and sank off Sunderland, County Durham. Her crew were rescued by North Star.

== 20 June ==
List of shipwrecks: 20 June 1879
Ship	State	Description
Constantin, and Joseph	Denmark; United Kingdom	The steamship Constantin collided with the steamship Joseph 12 1/4 nautical miles (22.7 km) off Hanstholm and sank with the loss of a crew member. She was on a voyage from Copenhagen to Newcastle upon Tyne, Northumberland. Joseph was on a voyage from Montrose, Forfarshire to a Baltic port. She was severely damaged at the bow and taken in to Copenhagen for repairs.
Franklyn Belle	New Zealand	The ketch stranded at Oamaru, New Zealand, during a storm after dragging her anchors and became a wreck.
Her Royal Highness	United Kingdom	The ship ran aground at Dunkirk, Nord, France and was severely damaged. She was refloated in July.

== 21 June ==
List of shipwrecks: 21 June 1879
Ship	State	Description
Annie	New Zealand	The cutter sank at the mouth of the Whanganui River during a heavy sea.
Barbarossa	Germany	The steamship Italy (United Kingdom) collided with the steamship Canada (United Kingdom) and then collided with Barbarossa at New York, United States. Barbarossa sank.
Bells	New Zealand	The barque was driven ashore at Lyttelton. She floated off and sank
Blonde	United Kingdom	The schooner was damaged off Margate, Kent by a shell fired by the Margate Artillery Corps, which went through her bows. She was taken in to Margate.
Kingston	United Kingdom	The ship ran aground on the Romania Reef. She was declared a total loss. She was on a voyage from Singapore, Straits Settlements to Shanghai, China.
Mary Blair	New Zealand	The ship was driven ashore at Timaru. She was refloated.
Pelican	New Zealand	The ship was driven ashore at Timaru. She was on a voyage from Oamaru to Timaru.
Swallow	New Zealand	The brigantine was wrecked at the mouth of Tory Channel in the Marlborough Sounds, New Zealand. Her crew survived. She was on a voyage from Lyttelton, New Zealand to Newcastle.

== 22 June ==
List of shipwrecks: 22 June 1879
Ship	State	Description
Ann and Laura	United Kingdom	The schooner sprang a leak and sank in the Irish Sea 25 nautical miles (46 km) off the coast of Caernarfonshire. Her crew reached land in a boat. She was on a voyage from Glasgow, Renfrewshire to Liverpool, Lancashire.
Glenean	United Kingdom	The brig ran aground on the Gunfleet Sand, in the North Sea off the coast of Essex. She was on a voyage from Newcastle upon Tyne to Chatham, Kent. She was refloated with the assistance of eight smacks and a tug and resumed her voyage in a leaky condition.
Trowbridge	United Kingdom	The full-rigged ship ran aground at Queenstown, County Cork. She was refloated with the assistance of a tug.

== 23 June ==
List of shipwrecks: 23 June 1879
Ship	State	Description
Akbar	New South Wales	The ship was driven ashore at Timaru, New Zealand, with the loss of four lives.
Colina	United Kingdom	The steamship was driven ashore at Batiscanie, Quebec, Canada. She was on a voyage from Glasgow, Renfrewshire to Montreal, Quebec. She was refloated with assistance on 30 June and taken in to Quebec City for repairs.
Constantin	Denmark	The steamship collided with the steamship Joseph (United Kingdom) and sank at Hirtshals with the loss of a crew member. Constantin was on a voyage from Copenhagen to Newcastle upon Tyne, Northumberland, United Kingdom.
Gysbertus Hermanus	Netherlands	The ship ran aground on the Flemish Bank, in the North Sea. She was on a voyage from Newcastle upon Tyne to Java, Netherlands East Indies. She was refloated and taken in to Brouwershaven, Zeeland in a leaky condition.
Hope	United Kingdom	The ship was wrecked on the Gunfleet Sand, in the North Sea off the coast of Essex. Her crew survived. She was on a voyage from Hartlepool, County Durham to London.

== 24 June ==
List of shipwrecks: 24 June 1879
Ship	State	Description
Agnes	United Kingdom	The brig collided with Africaine (France) and sank off Gibraltar with the loss of a crew member. Survivors were rescued by Africaine. Agnes was on a voyage from Agrigento, Sicily, Italy to Dordrecht, South Holland, Netherlands.
Condor	Germany	The steamship collided with a barque and sank west of Gotland, Sweden. Her crew were rescued by the steamship Allegra (Sweden). Condor was on a voyage from Kronstadt, Russia to Antwerp, Belgium.
Margaret	United Kingdom	The schooner collided with the steamship Queenboro (United Kingdom). She was on a voyage from Danzig to Ghent, West Flanders, Belgium. She was taken in to Vlissingen, Zeeland, Netherlands in a waterlogged condition.

== 25 June ==
List of shipwrecks: 25 June 1879
Ship	State	Description
Anne Marie	United Kingdom	The schooner was driven ashore south of Dragør, Denmark. She was on a voyage from Hartlepool, County Durham to Sundsvall, Sweden.
Beech	United Kingdom	The steamship ran aground on the Kinburn Spit. She was on a voyage from Nicholaieff, Russia to Lorient, Morbihan, France .
Empress Eugénie	United Kingdom	The schooner collided with the schooner Guiding Star (United Kingdom) and sank in the River Mersey at Tranmere, Cheshire. Empress Eugénie was on a voyage from Garston, Lancashire to Lough Swilly.
Principe Amedeo	Regia Marina	The Principe Amedeo-class ironclad collided with the steamship Mediteranee (Italy) off Riposto and was damaged. She was taken in to Naples for repairs.
Unnamed	Flag unknown	The ship ran aground on the Haisborough Sands, in the North Sea off the coast of Norfolk, United Kingdom. She was refloated and resumed her voyage.

== 26 June ==
List of shipwrecks: 26 June 1879
Ship	State	Description
Coronetta	Netherlands	The steamship ran aground in the Nieuwe Waterweg. She was on a voyage from Kronstadt, Russia to Rotterdam, South Holland.

== 27 June ==
List of shipwrecks: 27 June 1879
Ship	State	Description
Avon	United Kingdom	The steamship was beached at Holyhead, Anglesey in a sinking condition. She was on a voyage from Garston, Lancashire to Dublin.
Frank F. Curling	United States	The ship foundered off Cape Horn, Chile. Her crew were rescued. She was on a voyage from Liverpool, Lancashire, United Kingdom to San Francisco, California.
Lydia Budd	United States	The schooner went aground on the bar at Absecon, New Jersey near Life Saving Station No. 27, 4th District and sank. Her crew, and the captain's wife and two children, was rescued by the United States Life Saving Service.
Mary	New Zealand	The schooner was wrecked on Great Barrier Island, New Zealand, after being driven ashore in a gale.
M. Moxhan	United Kingdom	The steamship collided with the steamship Intrepid (United Kingdom and sank in the Sulina branch of the Danube 40 nautical miles (74 km) from its mouth.
Three Brothers	New Zealand	The cutter was wrecked at Coromandel, New Zealand, after being driven ashore in a gale.
154	Russia	The lighter sank at Kronstadt.

== 28 June ==
List of shipwrecks: 28 June 1879
Ship	State	Description
B.L.	Unknown	The 364-ton barque went ashore on the Canterbury, New Zealand, coast north of New Brighton during a gale while en route from San Francisco to Lyttelton.
Lily Baynes	United Kingdom	The schooner ran aground on the Pennington Spit, off the coast of Hampshire. She was on a voyage from London to Belfast, County Antrim.
Paulina Cox	United Kingdom	The sloop sprang a leak and sank in the Caribbean Sea. All on board were rescued. She was on a voyage from Barbados to Grenada.

== 29 June ==
List of shipwrecks: 29 June 1879
Ship	State	Description
Akbar	New Zealand	The brigantine went ashore and was wrecked at Timaru, New Zealand, during a strong gale. The captain, his wife, and three crew members were drowned.
Cephas Starret	United States	The schooner was severely damaged by fire at New Orleans, Louisiana. She was scuttled with the assistance of two tugs, one of which was Pholector (United States).
Emma and Alice	United Kingdom	The barque was abandoned at sea. Her crew were rescued. She was on a voyage from Sydney, New South Wales to Java, Netherlands East Indies.
Hermann Becker	Norway	The barque was driven ashore at Narva, Russia.
Robert Hendrikus	Netherlands	The ship was driven ashore at Narva.

== 30 June ==
List of shipwrecks: 30 June 1879
Ship	State	Description
Arctic	United States	The ship was driven ashore on Block Island, Rhode Island. She was on a voyage from New York to Luarca, Spain. She was refloated and taken in to Newport, Rhode Island in a leaky condition.
Barnard Castle	United Kingdom	The steamship ran aground in Lake Saint Pierre. She was on a voyage from Montreal, Quebec, Canada to London. She was refloated on 3 July and taken in to Trois-Rivières, Quebec.
Brownie	United Kingdom	The yacht was driven from her moorings and ran aground at Wareham, Dorset. She was refloated.
Echo	United Kingdom	The schooner ran aground in the Scheldt. She was on a voyage from Santos, Brazil to Antwerp, Belgium. She was refloated with the assistance of a tug.
Florence L. Thomas	United States	The ship ran aground off Mutton Island, County Galway, United Kingdom. She was on a voyage from Philadelphia, Pennsylvania to Galway. She was refloated.
Jeanne d'Arc	France	The barque struck a sunken wreck and foundered in the Atlantic Ocean. Her thirteen crew took to two boats, one of which subsequently foundered. All ended up in the longboat. They were rescued on 13 July by the barque Corsica (United Kingdom). Jeanne d'Arc was on a voyage from Marseille, Bouches-du-Rhône to Réunion.
John Williamson	United Kingdom	The steamship ran aground at Maassluis, South Holland, Netherlands. She was on a voyage from Kronstadt, Russia to Rotterdam, South Holland. She was refloated the next day with the assistance of a tug.
Kepler	United Kingdom	The steamship ran aground at Maassluis. She was on a voyage from Riga, Russia to Rotterdam. She was refloated the next day with the assistance from a tug.
Prince Frederick William	United Kingdom	The paddle steamer became waterlogged in the Bristol Channel off Lundy Island, Devon. She was on a voyage from Liverpool, Lancashire to Ramsgate, Kent. She was towed in to Penarth, Glamorgan by the steamship Belonnie (United Kingdom.
Wild Duck	United Kingdom	The trawler collided with the smack Wetherill (United Kingdom) and sank in the North Sea. Her seven crew were rescued by Wetherill.
Unnamed	United Kingdom	The lighter sank at Southampton, Hampshire.

== Unknown date ==
List of shipwrecks: Unknown date in June 1879
Ship	State	Description
Alsace-Lorraine	France	The fishing smack was wrecked on the coast of Iceland. Her crew survived.
Annie	United Kingdom	The steamship tan aground at Guadiaro, Spain. She was refloated and taken in to Gibraltar.
Annie Murchie	United States	The ship was abandoned at sea. She was on a voyage from Cárdenas, Cuba to New York.
Auguste Clemence	France	The fishing smack was wrecked on the coast of Iceland. Her crew survived.
Anna Maria	Sweden	The schooner ran aground south of Dragør, Denmark. She was on a voyage from Hartlepool, County Durham, United Kingdom to Sundsvall.
Carl XV	Sweden	The brig ran aground. She was on a voyage from Ostend, West Flanders, Belgium to Copenhagen, Denmark. She was refloated and completed her voyage.
City of Gloucester	United States	The schooner was wrecked off Chatham, Massachusetts. Her crew were rescued.
Collector	United States	The ship collided with the steamship Oder (Germany) and was abandoned in the Atlantic Ocean before 13 June with some loss of life. She was on a voyage from Arendal, Norway to New York.
Corine and Augustine	France	The ship foundered at sea. Her crew were rescued.
Derzhava	Imperial Russian Navy	The royal yacht ran aground in late June. She was on a voyage from Kronstadt to Copenhagen. She was refloated two days later and resumed her voyage, arriving at Copenhagen on 29 June.
Elena P.	Austria-Hungary	The brig was wrecked in the Tonalá River.
Fa	Austria-Hungary	The barque was damaged by fire at Philadelphia, Pennsylvania, United States.
Helen	United Kingdom	The barque collided with City of New York (United States) and sank at New York with the loss of five of her ten crew. Helen was on a voyage from Havana, Cuba to New York.
Henrietta	United Kingdom	The barque ran aground on the Middle Ground Shoal. She was on a voyage from Bombay, India to Liverpool. She was refloated and resumed her voyage.
Henriette	France	The brig was driven ashore at "Punta Blanca". She was on a voyage from Tampico, Mexico to Havre de Grâce, Seine-Inférieure. She was a total loss.
Idog	Sweden	The brig ran aground on the Saltholm Flagge, in the Droogden.
Ironsport	New Zealand	The brig left Auckland for Whangaroa on 11 June and was not seen again.
Jane Rennie	United Kingdom	The barquentine struck rocks and sank with the loss of six of her nine crew. She was on a voyage from Rio de Janeiro, Brazil to New York. The survivors were rescued four days later by a steamship, but two of them subsequently died in hospital in New York.
Japan	Germany	The brig was driven ashore and wrecked at Lagos, Lagos Colony. Her crew were rescued.
Kingston	United Kingdom	The ship ran aground on the Romania Reef and was wrecked. She was on a voyage from Singapore, Straits Settlements to Saigon, French Indo-China.
Llanishen	United Kingdom	The steamship ran aground on the Millandgrundet, in the Baltic Sea. She was on a voyage from Kronstadt to London. She was refloated with assistance from the salvage vessel Neptune (Flag unknown) and resumed her voyage.
Loch Awe	United Kingdom	The ship ran aground at Montrose, Forfarshire. She was on a voyage from Kronstadt to Montrose. She was refloated the next day and taken in to Montrose.
Mabel	United Kingdom	The ship struck a rock at Saint Lucia and was severely damaged.
Marie Gabriel	France	The brig collided with the steamship State of Alabama (United Kingdom) and sank.
Molière	France	The barque ran aground at "Port François", Mauritius She was on a voyage from Cardiff, Glamorgan, United Kingdom to Mauritius. She was refloated and found to be leaky.
Monchgut	Germany	The ship was wrecked on Fair Isle, United Kingdom. Her crew were rescued.
Mystery	United Kingdom	The ship sank at Walton-on-the-Naze, Essex before 11 June.
Oamaru	New Zealand	The brigantine left Auckland for Whangaroa on 11 June and was not seen again.
Otto	Germany	The ship was wrecked at Yokohama, Japan. Her crew were rescued.
Ouvre	France	The fishing smack was wrecked on the coast of Iceland. Her crew survived.
Secondo Z.	Italy	The barque struck a rock and sank at Montevideo, Uruguay. She was on a voyage from Cardiff, Glamorgan to Montevideo.
Selina M. Smurthey	United States	The schooner was abandoned in the Atlantic Ocean before 29 June.
Shun Lee	China	The steamship was driven ashore and wrecked at Shantung.
Spartan	United Kingdom	The ship was driven ashore at the South Foreland, Kent. She was on a voyage from Antwerp, Belgium to Cardiff. She was refloated and completed her voyage.
Syra	Germany	The barque was driven ashore and wrecked at Villa del Cerro, Uruguay between 23 and 25 June.
Thessaly	United Kingdom	The steamship was driven ashore in the Red Sea. All on board were rescued. She was on a voyage from Havre de Grâce to Bombay. She had been refloated by 5 August.
Tordenskjold	Norway	The ship ran aground on the Longsand, in the North Sea off the coast of Essex, United Kingdom. She was on a voyage from South Shields, County Durham to Tarragona, Spain. She was refloated on 2 July and taken in to Ramsgate, Kent, United Kingdom in a leaky condition.
Tyne	United Kingdom	The ship was driven ashore at the mouth of the River Spey. She was refloated on 14 June and taken in to "Kingstown port".
Unnamed	United States	The schooner was abandoned in the Atlantic Ocean before 13 June.
