= Italian ship Castelfidardo =

Castelfidardo was the name of at least two ships of the Italian Navy and may refer to:

- Italian ironclad Castelfidardo, a Regina Maria Pia-class ironclad launched in 1863 and stricken in 1910
- Italian destroyer Castelfidardo, a Curtatone-class destroyer launched in 1922, seized by Germany in 1943 being renamed TA16 and sunk in 1944
