= Italian ship San Martino =

San Martino was the name of at least two ships of the Italian Navy and may refer to:

- Italian ironclad San Martino, a Regina Maria Pia-class ironclad launched in 1863 and stricken in 1903
- Italian destroyer San Martino, a Palestro-class destroyer launched in 1920, seized by Germany in 1943 being renamed TA17 and scuttled in 1944
