= Italian ship Palestro =

Palestro was the name of at least three ships of the Italian Navy and may refer to:

- Italian coastal defense ship Palestro, a coastal defense ship sunk at the Battle of Lissa in 1866
- Italian ironclad Palestro, a Principe Amedeo-class ironclad launched in 1871 and scrapped in 1902
- Italian destroyer Palestro, a Palestro-class destroyer launched in 1919 and sunk in 1940
