= Italian ironclad Principe Amedeo =

Ironclad warship of the Italian Royal Navy

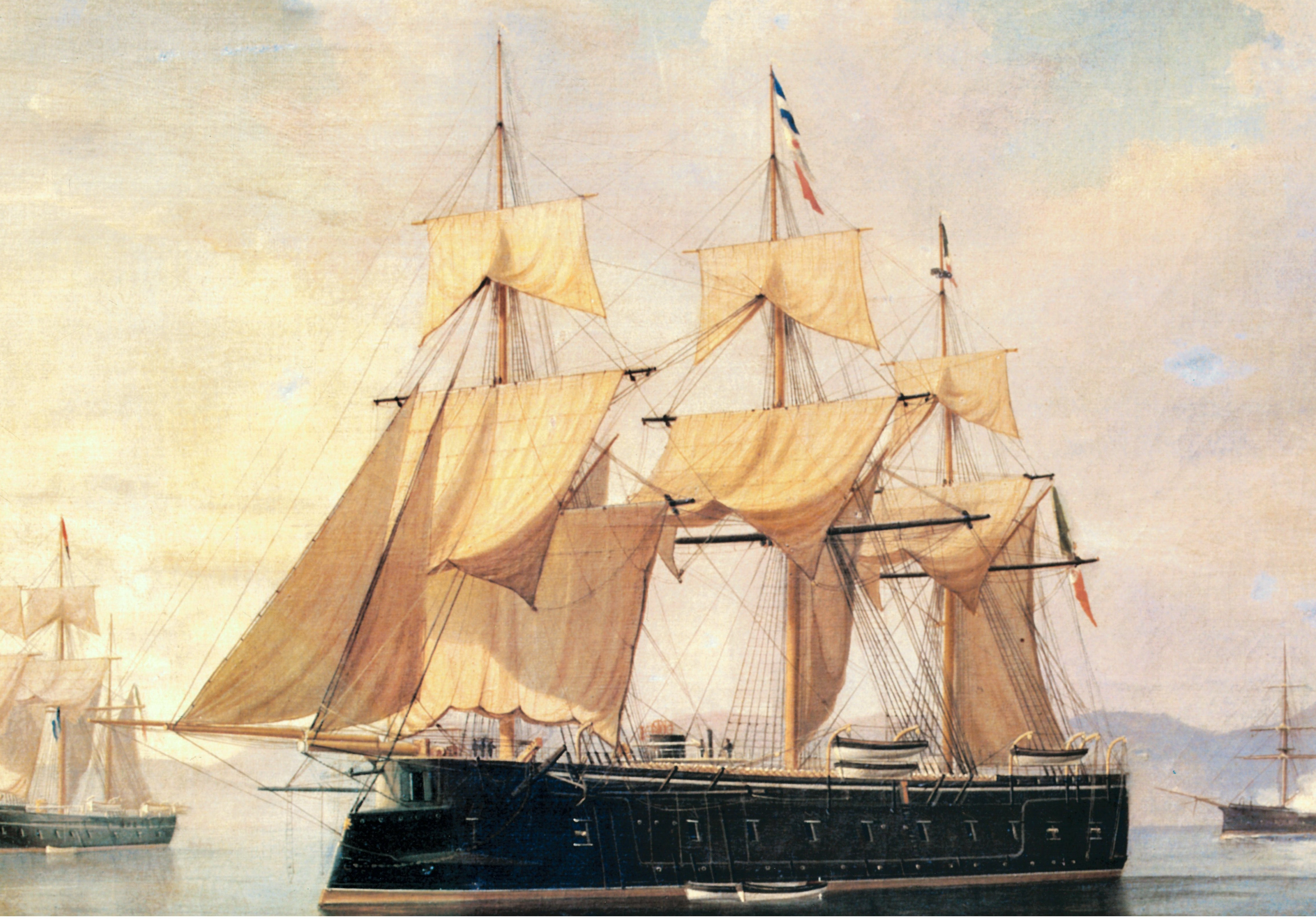
- Painting of Principe Amedeo from the 1880s

History

Italy
- Name: Principe Amedeo
- Namesake: Prince Amedeo
- Builder: Regio Cantiere di Castellammare di Stabia
- Laid down: August 1865
- Launched: 15 January 1872
- Completed: 15 December 1874
- Stricken: 28 March 1895
- Fate: Sold for scrap, 1910

General characteristics
- Class & type: Principe Amedeo-class ironclad
- Displacement: Normal: 5,761 long tons (5,853 t); Full load: 6,020 long tons (6,117 t)
- Length: 79.73 m (261 ft 7 in)
- Beam: 17.4 m (57 ft 1 in)
- Draft: 7.9 m (25 ft 11 in)
- Installed power: 6 fire-tube boilers; 6,117 ihp (4,561 kW)
- Propulsion: 1 × marine steam engine; 1 × screw propeller
- Speed: 12.2 knots (22.6 km/h; 14.0 mph)
- Range: 1,780 nmi (3,300 km) at 10 kn (19 km/h; 12 mph)
- Complement: 548
- Armament: 6 × 254 mm (10 in) guns; 1 × 279 mm (11 in) gun
- Armor: Belt armor: 221 mm (8.7 in); Casemate: 140 mm (5.5 in); Conning tower: 61 mm (2.4 in)

Principe Amedeo was an ironclad warship built by the Italian Regia Marina (Royal Navy) in the 1860s and 1870s. She was the lead ship of the Principe Amedeo class, alongside her sister ship Palestro. Principe Amedeo was laid down in 1865, launched in 1872, and completed in late 1874. She was armed with a battery of six 254 mm (10 in) guns and one 279 mm (11 in) gun. The last sail-rigged ironclad of the Italian fleet, she had a single steam engine that was capable of propelling the ship at a speed of slightly over 12 knots (22 km/h; 14 mph).

Principe Amedeo's lengthy construction time rendered her obsolescent by the time she entered service. As a result, she primarily served as a station ship in Italy's overseas empire. In November 1881, she collided with the ironclad Roma in a storm in Naples. Principe Amadeo was withdrawn from service in 1888 and converted into a headquarters ship for the vessels defending Taranto. She was stricken from the naval register in 1895 and thereafter used as a depot ship until she was broken up for scrap in 1910.

== Design ==
Plan and profile drawing of Palestro; Principe Amedeo's 10-inch guns were in a single casemate.

Following the unification of Italy in early 1861, the new Regia Marina (Royal Navy) embarked on a naval construction program that sparked the Austro-Italian ironclad arms race. Expecting another war with the Austrian Empire, the Italians built or purchased sixteen ironclads between 1860 and 1865; the last of these were the Principe Amedeo class. They were also the first central battery ships designed for the Italian fleet. An improved version of the preceding Roma class, they were nevertheless obsolete by the time they entered service.

Principe Amedeo was 79.73 meters (261 ft 7 in) long between perpendiculars; she had a beam of 17.4 m (57 ft 1 in) and an average draft of 7.9 m (25 ft 11 in). She displaced 5,761 long tons (5,853 t) normally and up to 6,020 long tons (6,120 t) at full load. Her superstructure consisted of a small conning tower. She had a crew of 548 officers and men.

Her propulsion system consisted of one single-expansion steam engine that drove a single screw propeller, with steam supplied by six coal-fired, cylindrical fire-tube boilers that were vented through a single funnel placed directly aft of the conning tower. Her engine produced a top speed of 12.2 knots (22.6 km/h; 14.0 mph) at 6,117 indicated horsepower (4,561 kW). She carried up to 580 t (570 long tons; 640 short tons) of coal, allowing her to steam for 1,780 nautical miles (3,300 km; 2,050 mi) at a speed of 10 knots (19 km/h; 12 mph). The ship was barque-rigged to supplement the steam engine; Principe Amedeo and her sister were the last rigged ironclads to be built by Italy.

Principe Amedeo was armed with a main battery of six 10 in (254 mm) guns, mounted in a single armored casemates placed amidships, with three guns on each broadside. A 11 in (279 mm) gun was mounted forward as a bow chaser. Principe Amedeo was protected by iron belt armor that was 8.7 in (221 mm) thick and extended for the entire length of the hull. The casemates were protected with 5.5 in (140 mm) of iron plating, and the small conning tower had 2.4 in (61 mm) thick iron plates.

== Service history ==
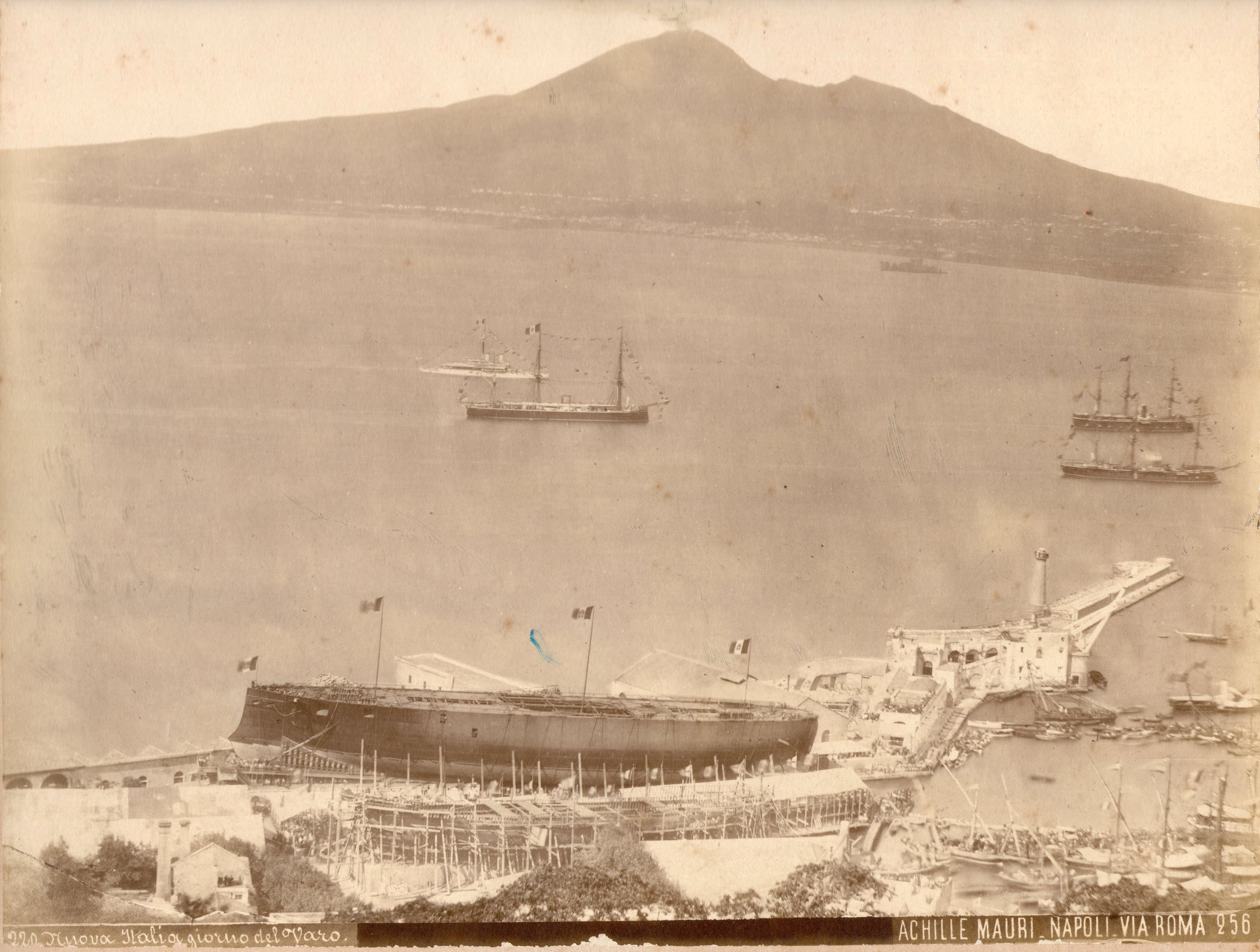
Principe Amedeo (right background) at the launch for the ironclad Italia in 1880. The other ships present are the Italian Regina Maria Pia (in front of Principe Amedeo) and the British HMS Monarch and Thunderer.

Principe Amedeo was laid down at the Arsenale di La Spezia in August 1865, and her completed hull was launched on 15 January 1872. Fitting-out work proceeded very slowly, and the ship was finally completed on 15 December 1874. Obsolescent by the time she was completed, Principe Amedeo primarily served in the Italian colonial empire, which Italy had begun acquiring in the 1880s. She occasionally took part in training maneuvers with the main Italian fleet throughout her career.

On 25 June 1879, Principe Amedeo collided with the Italian steamship Mediteranee off Riposto. Both vessels were damaged. Principe Amedeo was taken in to Naples for repairs. She took part in the launching ceremony for the ironclad Italia on 29 September 1880; also present were the Italian ironclad Regina Maria Pia and King Umberto I aboard his yacht, and the British ironclads HMS Monarch and Thunderer with Vice Admiral George Tryon, both members of the Mediterranean Fleet. At the time, Principe Amedeo flew the flag of Vice Admiral Martini. In early November 1881, Principe Amedeo was moored in Naples when a severe storm tore the ironclad Roma free from her anchors and knocked her into Principe Amedeo. Neither ship was damaged in the collision.

For the annual fleet maneuvers held in 1885, Principe Amedeo served as the flagship of the "Eastern Squadron", with Rear Admiral Civita commanding. She was joined by the ironclad Castelfidardo, the corvette Amerigo Vespucci, a sloop, and four torpedo boats. The "Eastern Squadron" defended against an attacking "Western Squadron", simulating a Franco-Italian conflict, with operations conducted off Sardinia. During the exercises, Principe Amedeo was forced to "surrender" by the ironclad Duilio.

From 1888 to 1889, Principe Amedeo was employed as the headquarters ship for the forces defending Taranto. By this time, she had been equipped with six 2.9 in (74 mm) guns for close-range defense, six machine guns, and two torpedo tubes. The ship was stricken from the naval register on 28 March 1895 and thereafter used as an ammunition depot ship in Taranto. She was eventually broken up for scrap in 1910.
