= Principe Amedeo-class ironclad =

Ironclad warship class of the Italian Royal Navy

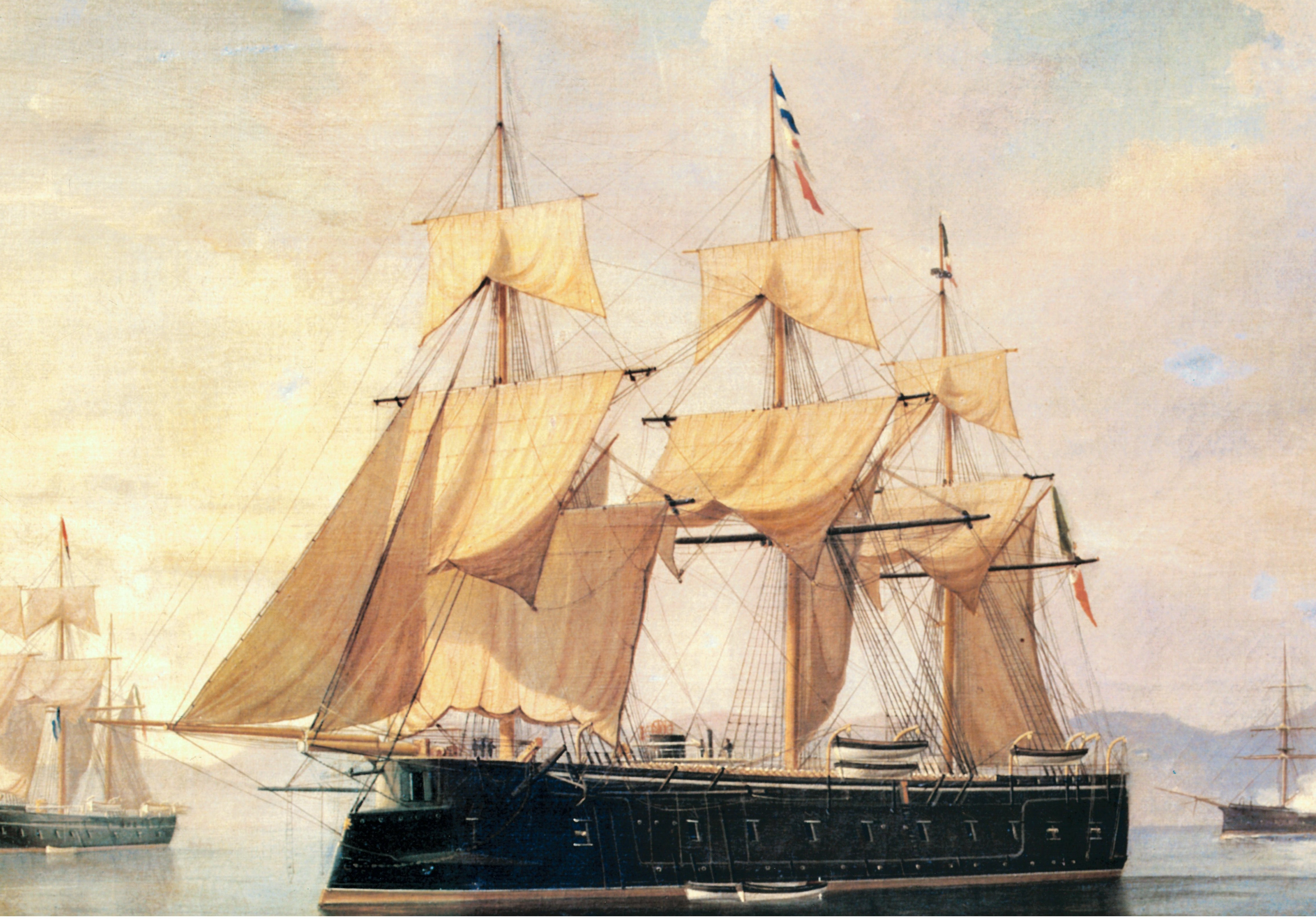
- Painting of Principe Amedeo

Class overview
- Name: Principe Amedeo class
- Builders: Regio Cantiere di Castellammare di Stabia; Arsenale di La Spezia
- Operators: Regia Marina
- Preceded by: Affondatore
- Succeeded by: Duilio class
- Built: 1865–1875
- In commission: 1874–1900
- Completed: 2
- Retired: 2

General characteristics (Note: Figures are for Principe Amedeo)
- Type: Ironclad warship
- Displacement: Normal: 5,761 long tons (5,853 t); Full load: 6,020 long tons (6,117 t)
- Length: 79.73 m (261 ft 7 in)
- Beam: 17.4 m (57 ft 1 in)
- Draft: 7.9 m (25 ft 11 in)
- Installed power: 6 fire-tube boilers; 6,117 ihp (4,561 kW)
- Propulsion: 1 × marine steam engine; 1 × screw propeller
- Speed: 12.2 knots (22.6 km/h; 14.0 mph)
- Range: 1,780 nmi (3,300 km) at 10 kn (19 km/h; 12 mph)
- Complement: 548
- Armament: 6 × 254 mm (10 in) guns; 1 × 279 mm (11 in) gun
- Armor: Belt armor: 221 mm (8.7 in); Casemate: 140 mm (5.5 in); Conning tower: 61 mm (2.4 in)

The Principe Amedeo class was a pair of ironclad warships built for the Italian Regia Marina (Royal Navy) in the 1870s and 1880s. They were the culmination of a major naval construction program designed to give Italy a powerful fleet of ironclads. The two ships, Principe Amedeo and Palestro, were the last Italian ironclads to feature sailing rigs and wooden hulls. They were armed with a battery of six 254 mm (10 in) guns and were capable of a speed in excess of 12 knots (22 km/h; 14 mph). The ships had uneventful careers, spending much of it in Italy's colonial empire. By the late 1880s, they were withdrawn from service and employed in secondary roles, first as headquarters ships for harbor defenses. Principe Amedeo was converted into a depot ship in 1895 and was discarded in 1910, while Palestro was used as a training ship from 1894 to 1900 before being scrapped between 1902 and 1904.

== Design ==
In 1862, the Italian government under Prime Minister Urbano Rattazzi and his naval minister Carlo Pellion di Persano made the decision to build a fleet of ironclad warships, which sparked the Austro-Italian ironclad arms race. The Italian fleet had already acquired a pair of small, French-built armored frigates of the Formidabile class, and two more vessels of the Re d'Italia class had been ordered from the United States. Five more ironclads were ordered from foreign shipyards, three wooden steam frigates already under construction were converted into armored ships, and four more ironclads were ordered from Italian shipyards. The two Principe Amedeo-class ships were the last two of this first generation of Italian ironclads. The design for Principe Amedeo was prepared by Inspector Engineer Giuseppe De Luca. He had initially planned on using entirely wooden hulls for the ships, but had changed to composite wood and iron construction by the time the ships were laid down. The design for the new ships was based on the preceding Roma class, but they were obsolete by the time they entered service.

=== General characteristics and machinery ===
Plan and profile drawing of Palestro; Principe Amedeo's 10-inch guns were in a single casemate

The two ships differed slightly in size. Principe Amedeo was 79.73 meters (261 ft 7 in) long between perpendiculars, while Palestro was 78.82 m (258 ft 7 in) long. Principe Amedeo had a beam of 17.4 m (57 ft 1 in) and a draft of 7.9 m (25 ft 11 in); Palestro's beam measured 17.3 m (56 ft 9 in), and she had a draft of 8 m (26 ft 3 in). Both ships displaced 5,761 long tons (5,853 t) normally, but Principe Amedeo displaced 6,020 long tons (6,120 t) at full load and Palestro reached 3,218 long tons (3,270 t). The ships had an inverted bow with a naval ram below the waterline. Their superstructure was minimal, consisting primarily of a small conning tower forward. They had a crew of 548 officers and men.

The ships' propulsion system consisted of one single-expansion steam engine that drove a single screw propeller, with steam supplied by six coal-fired, cylindrical fire-tube boilers. The boilers were trunked into a single funnel. The lead ship's engine produced a top speed of 12.2 knots (22.6 km/h; 14.0 mph) at 6,117 indicated horsepower (4,561 kW), while Palestro made 12.85 kn (23.80 km/h; 14.79 mph) at the same horsepower. Both ships had a capacity for 580 t (570 long tons; 640 short tons) of coal for the boilers, allowing them to steam for 1,780 nautical miles (3,300 km; 2,050 mi) at a cruising speed of 10 knots (19 km/h; 12 mph).

The ships were barque-rigged to supplement the steam engine; two masts were fitted with square sails and the third was gaff rigged. Principe Amedeo and her sister were the last rigged ironclad to be built by Italy. The ships' sail area were 36,738 square feet (3,413.1 m^{2}) for Principe Amedeo and 37,361 sq ft (3,471.0 m^{2}) for Palestro.

=== Armament and armor ===
Palestro and Principe Amedeo were both armed with a main battery of six 254 mm (10 in) guns, though they were mounted differently in each ship. Principe Amedeo carried hers in a single armored casemate located amidships, while Palestro's guns were mounted in three armored casemates. The first was located forward, toward the bow, the second and third were placed close to the stern on each side of the ship. Both ships also carried an 279 mm (11 in) gun that was mounted forward as a bow chaser. Later in her career, Principe Amedeo received a secondary battery of six 74 mm (2.9 in) guns and six machine guns, along with two torpedo tubes.

The two ships were protected by iron belt armor that was 221 mm (8.7 in) thick and extended for the entire length of the hull. The casemates were protected with 140 mm (5.5 in) of iron plating, and the small conning tower had 61 mm (2.4 in) thick iron plates.

== Ships ==
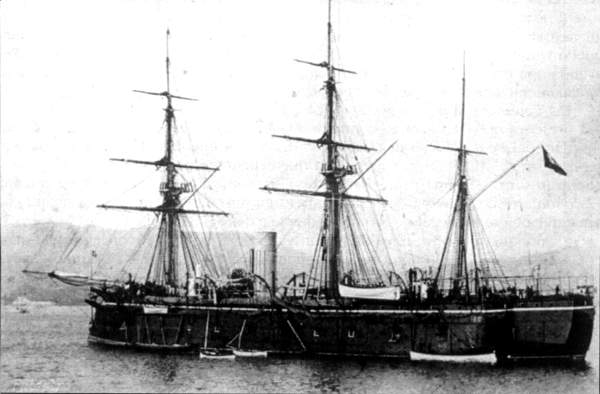
Palestro at anchor in La Spezia in 1887

Construction data
Name	Builder	Laid down	Launched	Completed
Principe Amedeo	Regio Cantiere di Castellammare di Stabia	August 1865	15 January 1872	15 December 1874
Palestro	Arsenale di La Spezia	August 1865	30 September or 2 October 1871	11 July 1875

== Service history ==
Neither ship had a particularly eventful career. They were completed too late to take part in the final stages of the wars of Italian unification. Instead, they were assigned to the Italian colonial empire, with occasional stints in the main Italian fleet. In 1880, Palestro took part in a naval demonstration off Ragusa in an attempt to force the Ottoman Empire to comply with the terms of the Treaty of Berlin and turn over the town of Ulcinj to Montenegro. The following year, Principe Amedeo was involved in a collision with the ironclad Roma during a hurricane, though neither ship was damaged.

In the late 1880s, both ships were withdrawn from frontline service and employed as headquarters ships for the defense of Taranto—Principe Amedeo—and La Maddalena—Palestro. Principe Amedeo was stricken from the naval register in 1895 and used as an ammunition depot ship in Taranto until 1910, when she was sold for scrap. Palestro was employed as a training ship between 1894 and 1900, when she too was stricken from the register. She was broken up between 1902 and 1904.
