= Italian ironclad Venezia =

Ironclad warship of the Italian Royal Navy

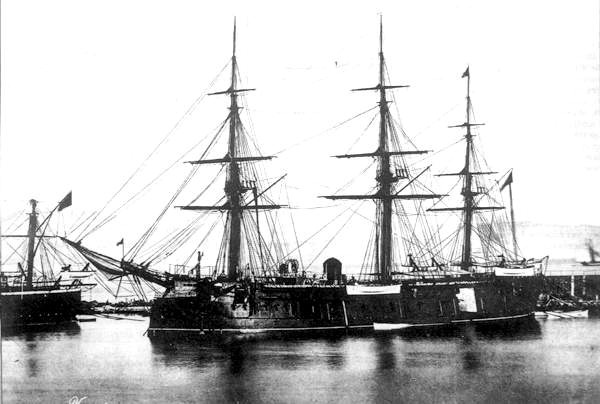
- Venezia at anchor in 1876

History

Italy
- Name: Venezia
- Namesake: Venice
- Builder: Cantiere della Foce
- Laid down: February 1863
- Launched: 21 January 1869
- Completed: 1 April 1873
- Stricken: 1895
- Fate: Scrapped, 1895–1896

General characteristics
- Class & type: Roma-class ironclad
- Displacement: Normal: 5,722 long tons (5,814 t); Full load: 6,151 long tons (6,250 t)
- Length: 79.65 m (261 ft 4 in)
- Beam: 17.48 m (57 ft 4 in)
- Draft: 7.6 m (24 ft 11 in)
- Installed power: 6 fire-tube boilers; 3,670 ihp (2,737 kW)
- Propulsion: 1 × marine steam engine; 1 × screw propeller
- Speed: 13 knots (24 km/h; 15 mph)
- Range: 1,940 nmi (3,590 km) at 10 kn (19 km/h; 12 mph)
- Complement: 549–551
- Armament: 18 × 254 mm (10 in) guns
- Armor: Belt armor: 150 mm (5.9 in); Casemate: 121 mm (4.75 in)

Venezia was the second of two Roma-class ironclad warships built for the Italian Regia Marina (Royal Navy) in the 1860s. She was armed with a main battery of eighteen 254 mm (10 in) guns in a central armored casemate. Her lengthy construction time, a result of her re-design from a broadside ironclad, quickly rendered her obsolescent compared to the new turret ships that began to enter service in the 1880s. As a result, her career was limited. She became a training ship in 1881 and served until 1895. Venezia was broken up for scrap the next year.

== Design ==
Following the Second Italian War of Independence in 1859 that had pitted the Kingdom of Sardinia against the Austrian Empire, and which had led to the unification of Italy under the Sardinian throne, the new Regia Marina (Italian Navy) and the Austrian Navy embarked on ironclad construction programs that created an arms race between the two countries. The two Roma-class ironclads were ordered in 1863 as part of the race. Venezia was designed as a broadside ironclad, but other navies had developed the central battery ship while she was under construction, prompting the Italian Navy to re-design the ship as this new type.

Venezia was 79.65 meters (261.3 ft) long between perpendiculars; she had a beam of 17.48 m (57.3 ft) and an average draft of 7.6 m (25 ft). She displaced 5,722 long tons (5,814 t) normally and up to 6,151 long tons (6,250 t) at full load. Her propulsion system consisted of one single-expansion steam engine that drove a single screw propeller, with steam supplied by six coal-fired, cylindrical fire-tube boilers that were vented through a single funnel. Her engine produced a top speed of 13 knots (24 km/h; 15 mph) from 3,670 indicated horsepower (2,740 kW). She could steam for 1,940 nautical miles (3,590 km; 2,230 mi) at a speed of 10 knots (19 km/h; 12 mph). The ship was barque-rigged to supplement the steam engine. She had a crew of 549–551 officers and men.

She was armed with a main battery of eighteen 254 mm (10 in) guns placed in a central casemate. The central battery design allowed two guns to fire ahead and two to fire astern. The ship was protected by iron belt armor that was 150 mm (5.9 in) thick and extended for the entire length of the hull at the waterline. The casemate was protected with 121 mm (4.75 in) of iron plating.

== Service history ==
Venezia's keel was laid down at the Cantiere della Foce shipyard in Genoa in February 1863, and her completed hull was launched on 21 January 1869. Fitting-out work was completed on 1 April 1873; the re-design work significantly delayed completion compared to her sister, which had been finished almost four years before. Completed as a central battery ship, Venezia rapidly became obsolescent, as the type was superseded by new turret ships such as the Duilio class whose construction began the same year Venezia entered service. In addition, the Italian naval budget was drastically reduced following the defeat at Lissa in 1866, which reflected a stark decrease in the government's confidence in the fleet. As a result, she saw little use during her career.

The ship's first major activity came soon after commissioning, serving as the flagship of Rear Admiral de Monale. In mid-1873, she several other Italian warships sailed to Spain during the Cantonal rebellion, along with a significant number of warships from other countries. In September, she and the aviso Authion were anchored off Escombreras, along with the British ironclad HMS Lord Warden and gunboats Torch, Hart, and Pheasant, and the Austro-Hungarian gunboat SMS Velebich.

On 23 November 1879, Venezia ran aground off Zakynthos, Greece, but she was later refloated. Venzia was converted into a torpedo training ship in 1881; her sailing rig was cut down and she was equipped with four 75 mm (3 in) guns and four 57 mm (2.2 in) guns. Her crew was significantly reduced to 302 officers and men. She served in this capacity until 23 August 1895 in La Spezia. The ship was stricken that year and had been broken up by 1896.
