= HMS Lothian =

History

United Kingdom
- Name: MV City of Edinburgh
- Owner: Ellerman's City Line
- Route: USA - Australia - New Zealand route until 1939
- Builder: Cammell Laird, Birkenhead
- Yard number: 1032
- Launched: 14 April 1938
- Completed: August 1938
- In service: 1938-1939
- Fate: Requisitioned by the British Ministry of War Transport in 1939.

- Name: MV City of Edinburgh
- Owner: Ministry of War Transport
- Operator: Ellerman's City Line
- In service: 1939-43
- Fate: Recommissioned into Royal Navy as headquarters ship
- Notes: Used as troop transport in November 1942 on convoy KMF4 for Operation Torch (the invasion of North Africa)

- Name: HMS Lothian
- Commissioned: September 1943
- Out of service: 1943-46
- Fate: Returned to owners
- Notes: Renamed HMS Lothian in 1943 and converted into a Landing Ship Infantry (Headquarters) LSI (H) for the Royal Navy.

History

- Name: MV City of Edinburgh
- Owner: Ellerman's City Line
- In service: 1946-61
- Fate: Sold to Hong Kong Salvage and Towage Company in 1961 and renamed Castle Mount for her last voyage to Hong Kong for scrapping in July 1961.

General characteristics
- Tonnage: 8,036 GRT
- Beam: 19 ft

HMS Lothian, was a former cargo ship launched in 1938, as MV City of Edinburgh, which was requisitioned during the Second World War as a troop transport and later converted by the Royal Navy into a headquarters ship in the Pacific. The ship is notable for a mutiny that occurred onboard whilst docked at Balboa, Panama in September 1944.

The ship was returned to her original owners, Ellerman's City Line, in 1946 and scrapped in 1961.

== History ==
Shortly after the start of the Second World War the City of Edinburgh was requisitioned by the Ministry of War Transport for war work. In September 1943 the ship was passed to the Admiralty and converted to a Landing Ship Headquarters for operations in the Pacific - operations for which she was totally unsuited.

In July 1944 the ship was recommissioned as HMS Lothian and was sent to be part of the U.S. 7th Fleet as part of Force X. Leaving the Clyde on 3 August 1944, the Lothian sailed for New York and then down to the Panama Canal. The ship's complement had swelled to 750 (instead of the normal 450) under the command of Rear Admiral Arthur George Talbot. Conditions aboard were extremely poor as the ship, being unsuited for tropical climates, had poor ventilation and air-conditioning and a lack of sufficient water.

After reaching Balboa, Panama on 1 September 1944, an armed mutiny (the first in the Royal Navy since the 19th century) occurred on-board due to the atrocious conditions. A Royal Marine detachment was sent on board to quell the mutiny. 17 senior men were court-martialled and reduced in rank, whilst other mutineers were given six months' extra duties and punishment drill. However, as the mutineers could not be removed from the ship in Balboa for lack of another ship or available jails, sentences were suspended and the ship proceeded to the Pacific.

Lothian joined the U.S. 7th Fleet at New Guinea on 29 September 1944, but the British vessel went unused by the Americans and the Lothian eventually set sail for Sydney, after seeing no combat.

In February 1945 the Lothian became flagship to Rear Admiral Douglas Blake Fisher and operated as a control ship for merchant transports arriving to supply the British Pacific Fleet. After the Japanese surrender in August 1945, the ship was used to evacuate civilians and prisoners of the Japanese from Singapore, Hong Kong and Shanghai.

In 1946 the Lothian was returned to the Ellerman Line and reverted to the MV City of Edinburgh. She resumed her previous route and in April 1961 was sold to Hong Kong Salvage and Towage Company, renamed Castle Mount and sailed to Hong Kong for scrapping in July 1961.

== Commands ==
Flagship Rear Admiral Arthur George Talbot	Flag Officer Commanding Force "X"	27 July 1944 to 23 February 1945
Flagship Rear Admiral Douglas Blake Fisher	Rear Admiral Fleet Train	23 February 1945 to 29 May 1945
