= Italian ironclad Roma =

Ironclad warship of the Italian Royal Navy

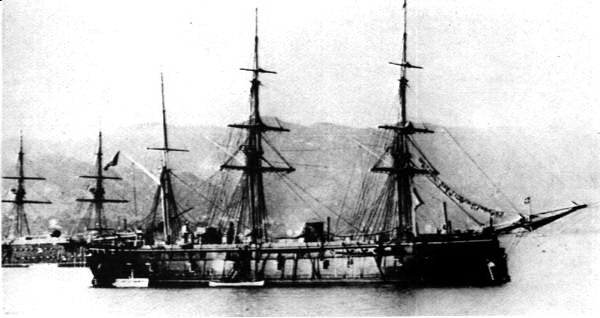
- Roma at anchor in September 1870

History

Italy
- Name: Roma
- Namesake: Rome
- Laid down: February 1863
- Launched: 18 December 1865
- Completed: May 1869
- Stricken: 1895
- Fate: Scrapped, 1896

General characteristics
- Class & type: Roma-class ironclad
- Displacement: Normal: 5,698 long tons (5,789 t); Full load: 6,151 long tons (6,250 t)
- Length: 79.67 m (261 ft 5 in)
- Beam: 17.33 m (56 ft 10 in)
- Draft: 7.57 m (24 ft 10 in)
- Installed power: 6 fire-tube boilers; 3,670 ihp (2,737 kW)
- Propulsion: 1 × marine steam engine; 1 × screw propeller
- Speed: 13 knots (24 km/h; 15 mph)
- Range: 1,940 nmi (3,590 km) at 10 kn (19 km/h; 12 mph)
- Complement: 549–551
- Armament: 5 × 254 mm (10 in) guns; 12 × 203 mm (8 in) guns
- Armor: Belt armor: 150 mm (5.9 in)

Roma was an ironclad warship built for the Italian Regia Marina (Royal Navy) in the 1860s; she was the lead ship of the Roma-class ironclads. Armed with a main battery of five 254 mm (10 in) and twelve 203 mm (8 in) guns in a broadside arrangement, Roma was obsolescent by the time she entered service. As a result, her career was limited. In 1880, she took part in an international naval demonstration off Ragusa to enforce the Treaty of Berlin. In November 1881, she collided with the ironclad Principe Amedeo in a storm in Naples, but she was not damaged. Roma was reduced to a guard ship in 1890 and then to a depot ship in 1895. In July 1896, she was scuttled to save the ship from a fire caused by a lightning strike. She was thereafter raised and broken up for scrap.

== Design ==
Following the Second Italian War of Independence in 1859 that had pitted the Kingdom of Sardinia against the Austrian Empire, and which had led to the unification of Italy under the Sardinian throne, the new Regia Marina (Italian Navy) and the Austrian Navy embarked on ironclad construction programs that created an arms race between the two countries. The two Roma-class ironclads were ordered in 1863 as part of the race.

Roma was 79.67 meters (261 ft 5 in) long between perpendiculars; she had a beam of 17.33 m (56 ft 10 in) and an average draft of 7.57 m (24 ft 10 in). She displaced 5,698 long tons (5,698 long tons) normally and up to 6,151 long tons (6,151 long tons) at full load. Her propulsion system consisted of one single-expansion steam engine that drove a single screw propeller, with steam supplied by six coal-fired, cylindrical fire-tube boilers that were vented through a single funnel. Her engine produced a top speed of 13 knots (24 km/h; 15 mph) from 3,670 indicated horsepower (2,740 kW). She carried up to 580 t (570 long tons; 640 short tons) of coal, allowing her to steam for 1,940 nautical miles (3,590 km; 2,230 mi) at a speed of 10 knots (19 km/h; 12 mph). The ship was barque-rigged to supplement the steam engine. She had a crew of 549–551 officers and men.

Roma was a broadside ironclad, and she was armed with a main battery of five 254 mm (10 in) guns and twelve 203 mm (8 in) guns. The ship was protected by iron belt armor that was 150 mm (5.9 in) thick and extended for the entire length of the hull at the waterline.

== Service history ==
The keel for Roma was laid down at the Cantiere della Foce shipyard in Genoa in February 1863. She was launched on 18 December 1865, and fitting-out work was finished by May 1869. By the time she entered service, other navies had begun to build casemate ships, rendering Roma obsolescent almost immediately after she was completed. In addition, the Italian naval budget was drastically reduced following the defeat at Lissa in 1866, which reflected a stark decrease in the government's confidence in the fleet. As a result, she saw little use during her career. In October 1867, Roma carried Vice Admiral Prince Amadeo for a visit to Constantinople. On reaching Çanakkale, Amadeo transferred to the gunboat Vedette for the voyage through the Dardanelles to Constnatinople. The naval budget was reduced so significantly in the late 1860s that the fleet had great difficulty in mobilizing its ironclad squadron to attack the port of Civitavecchia in September 1870, as part of the wars of Italian unification. Instead, the ships were laid up and the sailors conscripted to man them were sent home.

By October 1871, Roma had been assigned to La Spezia. There, she was joined by the ironclads Regina Maria Pia, San Martino, Castelfidardo, and Affondatore. In 1873, the ship was assigned to the 1st Division of the main Italian fleet unit, the Permanent Squadron, where she served as the flagship of Admiral Enrico Di Brocchetti. The other vessels of the division were the ironclads Ancona and Conte Verde. Together with the ships of the 2nd Division, the entire squadron cruised in the Mediterranean that year. In August, Roma, San Martino and the paddle steamer Plebiscito visited Barcelona, Spain. where they met a number of other foreign warships, including the French ironclad Jeanne d'Arc, the British ironclad HMS Pallas and corvette Rapid, and the United States frigate USS Wabash. By 21 October, Roma had moved to Alicante, Spain.

In 1874–1875, the ship's armament was revised to eleven 10-inch guns. In November 1880, Roma and the ironclad Palestro took part in a naval demonstration off Ragusa in an attempt to force the Ottoman Empire to comply with the terms of the Treaty of Berlin and turn over the town of Ulcinj to Montenegro. In early November 1881, Roma was moored in Naples when a severe storm tore the ship from her anchors. The heavy winds drove her into the ironclad Principe Amedeo, but neither ship was damaged in the collision.

During the annual fleet maneuvers held in 1885, Roma served in the 2nd Division of the "Western Squadron"; she was joined by the ironclad Affondatore and five torpedo boats. The "Western Squadron" attacked the defending "Eastern Squadron", simulating a Franco-Italian conflict, with operations conducted off Sardinia. The ship had her guns replaced again in 1886, this time with eleven 220 mm (8.7 in) guns. In 1890, Roma was removed from front-line service and tasked with the defense of La Spezia; while there, she served as the flagship of the local defense forces. While serving as a guard ship, her armament was reduced to five 8-inch guns. The ship was stricken on 5 May 1895 and thereafter used as an ammunition depot ship based in La Spezia. The ship was accidentally set on fire by a lightning strike on 28 July 1896; her crew scuttled the ship to prevent her from being burned completely. Roma was refloated the following month and then broken up for scrap immediately thereafter.
