= Italian ironclad Regina Maria Pia =

Ironclad warship of the Italian Royal Navy

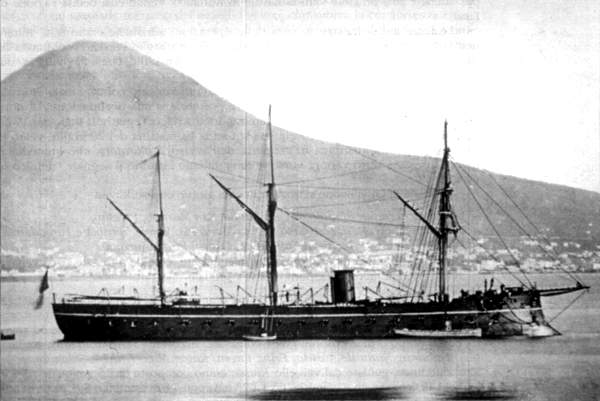
- Regina Maria Pia c. 1870

History

Italy
- Name: Regina Maria Pia
- Namesake: Maria Pia of Savoy
- Laid down: 22 July 1862
- Launched: 28 April 1863
- Completed: 17 April 1864
- Stricken: 1904
- Fate: Broken up

General characteristics
- Class & type: Regina Maria Pia-class ironclad
- Displacement: Normal: 4,201 long tons (4,268 t); Full load: 4,527 long tons (4,600 t)
- Length: 81.2 m (266 ft 5 in)
- Beam: 15.24 m (50 ft)
- Draft: 6.35 m (20 ft 10 in)
- Installed power: 6 rectangular boilers; 2,924 ihp (2,180 kW)
- Propulsion: 1 × marine steam engine; 1 × screw propeller
- Speed: 12.96 knots (24.00 km/h; 14.91 mph)
- Range: 2,600 nmi (4,800 km) at 10 kn (19 km/h; 12 mph)
- Complement: 480–485
- Armament: 4 × 203 mm (8 in) guns; 22 × 164 mm (6 in) guns
- Armor: Belt armor: 121 mm (4.75 in); Battery: 109 mm (4.3 in)

Regina Maria Pia was the lead ship of the Regina Maria Pia class of ironclad warships built in French shipyards for the Italian Regia Marina in the 1860s. She and her three sister ships were broadside ironclads, mounting a battery of four 203 mm (8 in) and twenty-two 164 mm (6.5 in) guns on the broadside. Regina Maria Pia was laid down in July 1862, was launched in April 1863, and was completed in April 1864.

Regina Maria Pia took part in the Battle of Lissa during the Third Italian War of Independence in 1866. She attacked the unarmored frigates in the Austrian second division, and damaged two vessels. Her career was limited after the war, owing to the emergence of more modern ironclads and a severe reduction in the Italian naval budget following their defeat at Lissa. She was rebuilt as a central battery ship some time after Lissa, and was modernized again in the late 1880s. Regina Maria Pia was eventually broken up for scrap in 1904.

== Design ==
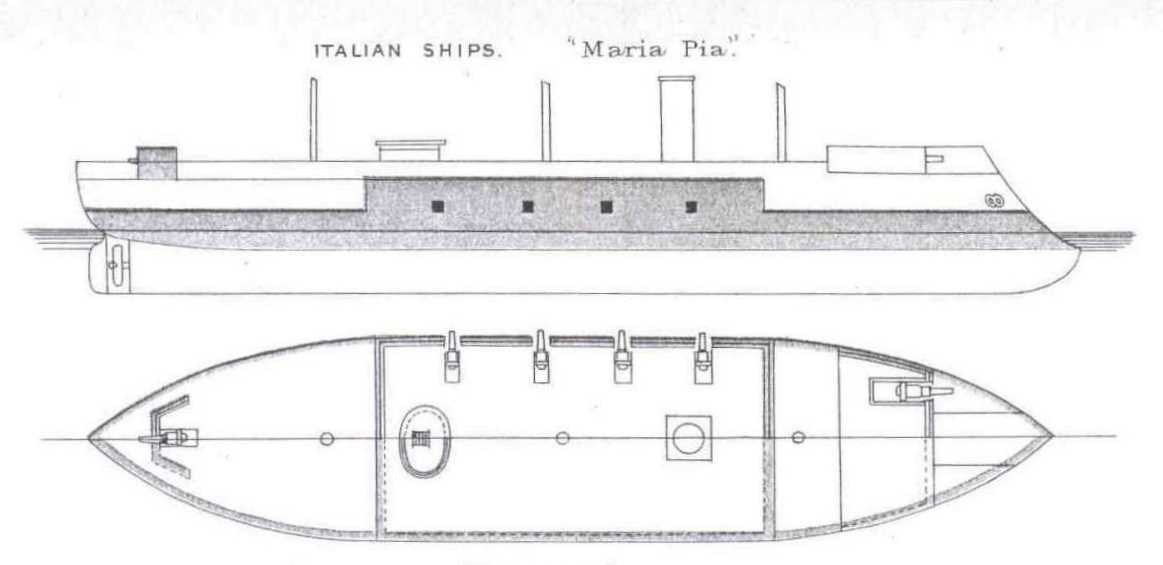
Plan and profile drawing of Regina Maria Pia in her 1888 configuration

In 1862, the Italian Regia Marina (Royal Navy) ordered four new ironclads from French shipyards, in the context of the Austro-Italian ironclad arms race. At the time, the new Kingdom of Italy expected another war with the Austrian Empire, having last fought the Austrians in 1859 during the Second Italian War of Independence. The four Regina Maria Pia-class ships were designed by their French builders, and were completed to slightly varying pairs: Regina Maria Pia and San Martino; and Castelfidardo and Ancona.

Regina Maria Pia was 81.2 meters (266 ft 5 in) long overall; she had a beam of 15.24 m (50 ft) and an average draft of 6.35 m (20 ft 10 in). She displaced 4,201 long tons (4,268 t) normally and up to 4,527 long tons (4,600 t) at full load. The ship had an inverted bow with a pronounced ram below the waterline. She had a crew of 480–485 officers and men.

The ship's propulsion system consisted of one single-expansion steam engine that drove a single screw propeller. Steam was supplied by eight coal-burning, rectangular fire-tube boilers that were vented through a single funnel. Her engine produced a top speed of 12.96 knots (24.00 km/h; 14.91 mph) from 2,924 indicated horsepower (2,180 kW). She could steam for 2,600 nautical miles (4,800 km; 3,000 mi) at a speed of 10 knots (19 km/h; 12 mph). The ship was initially schooner-rigged to supplement the steam engine, though her masts were later reduced to a barque rig. Ultimately, she lost her sailing rig completely, having it replaced with a pair of military masts with fighting tops.

Regina Maria Pia was a broadside ironclad, and she was initially armed with a main battery of four 203 mm (8 in) guns and twenty-two 164 mm (6.5 in) guns, though her armament changed throughout her career. The ship was protected by iron belt armor that was 121 mm (4.75 in) thick and extended for the entire length of the hull at the waterline. The battery deck was protected by 109 mm (4.3 in) of iron plate.

== Service history ==
Regina Maria Pia was built at the French shipyard Société Nouvelle des Forges et Chantiers de la Méditerranée in La Seyne. Her keel was laid down on 22 July 1862 and her completed hull was launched on 28 April 1863. The ship was completed on 17 April 1864 and delivered to the Italian fleet. In June 1866, Italy declared war on Austria, as part of the Third Italian War of Independence, which was fought concurrently with the Austro-Prussian War. The Italian fleet commander, Admiral Carlo Pellion di Persano, initially adopted a cautious course of action; he was unwilling to risk battle with the Austrian Navy, despite the fact that the Austrian fleet was much weaker than his own. Persano claimed he was simply waiting on the ironclad ram Affondatore, en route from Britain, but his inaction weakened morale in the fleet, with many of his subordinates openly accusing him of cowardice.

Rear Admiral Wilhelm von Tegetthoff brought the Austrian fleet to Ancona on June 27, in an attempt to draw out the Italians. At the time, many of the Italian ships were in disarray; several ships did not have their entire armament, and several others had problems with their engines. Regina Maria Pia was one of the few ironclads fit for action, so she, Castelfidardo, San Martino, and Principe di Carignano formed up to prepare to attack Tegetthoff's ships. Persano held a council of war aboard Principe di Carignano to determine whether he should sortie to engage Tegetthoff, but by that time, the Austrians had withdrawn, making the decision moot. The Minister of the Navy, Agostino Depretis, urged Persano to act and suggested the island of Lissa, to restore Italian confidence after their defeat at the Battle of Custoza the previous month. On 7 July, Persano left Ancona and conducted a sweep into the Adriatic, but encountered no Austrian ships and returned on the 13th.

=== Battle of Lissa ===
Map showing the disposition of the fleets on 20 July

On 16 July, Persano took the Italian fleet out of Ancona, bound for Lissa, where they arrived on the 18th. With them, they brought troop transports carrying 3,000 soldiers; the Italian warships began bombarding the Austrian forts on the island, with the intention of landing the soldiers once the fortresses had been silenced. In response, the Austrian Navy sent the fleet under Tegetthoff to attack the Italian ships. Regina Maria Pia was at that time in the 3rd Division, commanded by Captain Augusto Riboty, along with the ironclads Terribile, Formidabile, and Re di Portogallo, and the coastal defense ship Varese. The Italian 2nd and 3rd Divisions were sent to attack the coastal batteries protecting the town of Vis; Regina Maria Pia, Terribile, Re di Portogallo, and Varese were assigned the eastern defenses, while four other ironclads were tasked with suppressing the batteries on the western side. Formidabile was sent to engage Fort San Giorgio at close range while the other ironclads shelled it from afar; one shell from Regina Maria Pia detonated the fort's powder magazine, which neutralized the defenses. The success prompted Persano to order Regina Maria Pia and San Martino to attempt to force an entrance into the harbor, but heavy Austrian artillery fire forced him to break off the attempt. After the attack failed, the Italians withdrew late in the day, preparing to launch another attack the following morning. Persano ordered Formidabile to enter the harbor at Vis and attack the Madonna battery, supported by the ironclads Castelfidardo, Ancona, and Principe di Carignano.

The next morning, Persano ordered Formidibile to make her attack; Regina Maria Pia and the rest of the fleet would attempt to suppress the outer fortifications. This second attack also proved to be a failure. With the day's attacks again having yielded no results, Persano met with his senior officers to discuss options. His chief of staff, d'Amico, and Vacca both suggested a withdrawal owing to the shortage of coal, but Persano ruled that out. He ultimately decided to make another attempt on the 20th. Regina Maria Pia and the bulk of the fleet would again try to disable the outer forts in preparation for the landing. Before the Italians could begin the attack, but after the fleet had begun to disperse for the landing operation, the dispatch boat Esploratore arrived, bringing news of Tegetthoff's approach. Persano's fleet was in disarray; the three ships of Admiral Giovanni Vacca's 1st Division were three miles to the northeast from Persano's main force, and three other ironclads were further away to the west. Persano immediately ordered his ships to form up with Vacca's, first in line abreast formation, and then in line ahead formation. Regina Maria Pia initially was the last ship in the line, though Varese later joined up behind her.

Shortly before the action began, Persano decided to leave his flagship Re d'Italia and transfer to Affondatore, though none of his subordinates on the other ships were aware of the change. They were thus left to fight as individuals without direction. More dangerously, by stopping Re d'Italia, he allowed a significant gap to open up between Vacca's three ships and the rest of the fleet. Tegetthoff took his fleet through the gap between Vacca's and Persano's ships, in an attempt to split the Italian line and initiate a melee. He failed to ram any Italian vessels on the first pass, so he turned back toward Persano's ships, and took Re d'Italia, San Martino, and Palestro under heavy fire. The Austrians quickly inflicted serious damage on Re d'Italia and Palestro. While Tegetthoff's ironclads were attacking Persano's division, Riboty's division, including Regina Maria Pia, engaged Anton von Petz's division of unarmored steam frigates. In the melee, Regina Maria Pia collided with San Martino, damaging the latter's ram bow.

After Palestro withdrew, the Austrian ironclads turned their attention to the ships of Riboty's division. By this time, Re d'Italia had been rammed and sunk, and Palestro was burning furiously. Persano broke off the engagement to consolidate his forces, but his ships, low on coal and ammunition, and with badly demoralized crews, could not be rallied by Persano's half-hearted attempt to launch an attack. The Italian fleet began to withdraw, followed by the Austrians; as night began to fall, the opposing fleets disengaged completely, heading for Ancona and Pola, respectively. Regina Maria Pia had had one iron plate destroyed, and another had a steel shot lodged in it. She had been badly burned, and the flames had nearly reached her powder magazine. In return, she had damaged the Austrian ship of the line SMS Kaiser and the ironclad Prinz Eugen. After the battle, Vacca replaced Persano; he was ordered to attack the main Austrian naval base at Pola, but the war ended before the operation could be carried out.

=== Later career ===
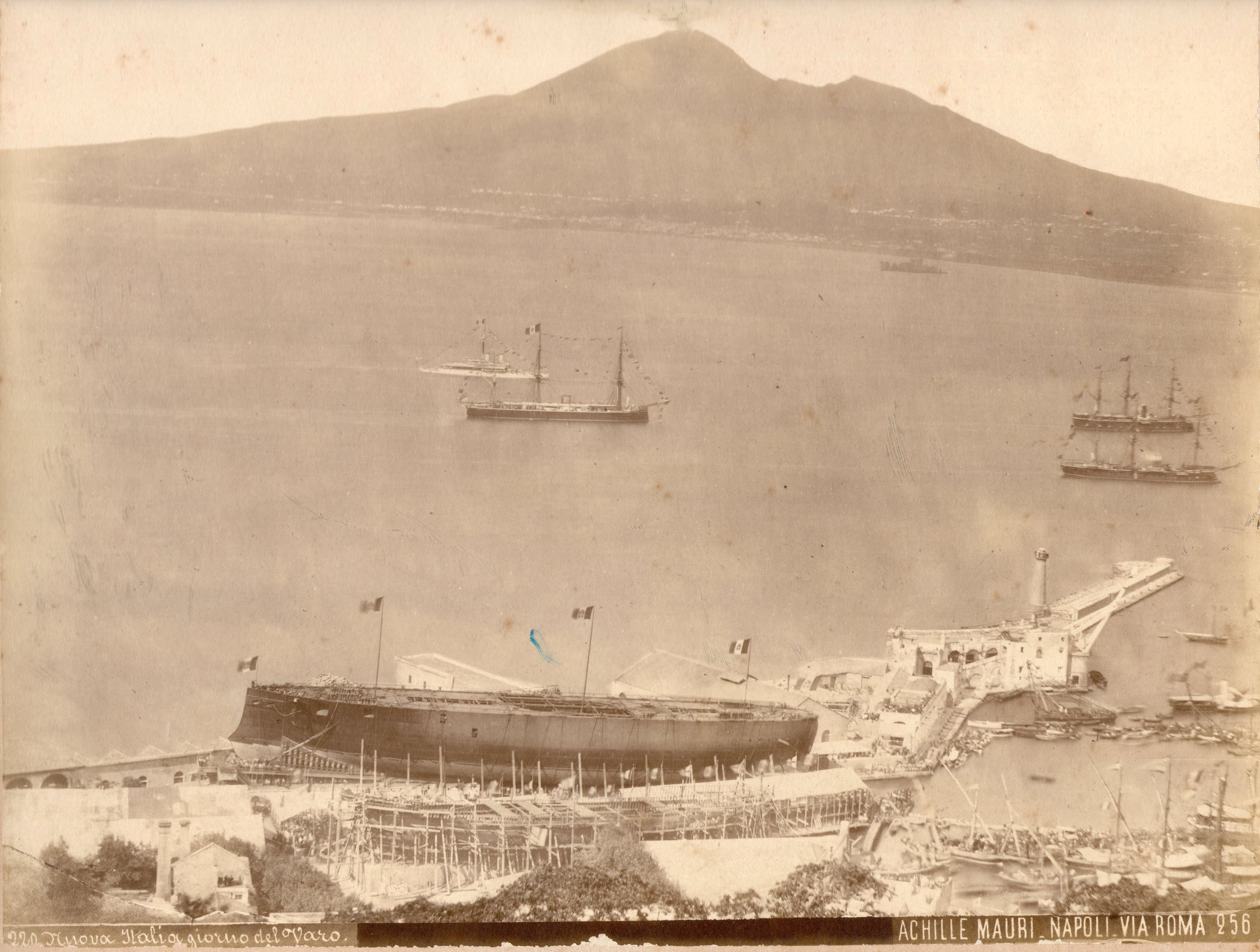
Regina Maria Pia (right background) at the launch for the ironclad Italia in 1880. The other ships present are the Italian Principe Amedeo (behind Regina Maria Pia) and the British HMS Monarch and Thunderer (center background)

For the rest of her long career, Regina Maria Pia served in a variety of roles, both in the main fleet and in Italy's colonial empire. In the immediate aftermath of the war, the Italian naval budget was drastically reduced; so significant were the cuts that the fleet had great difficulty in mobilizing its ironclad squadron to attack the port of Civitavecchia in September 1870, as part of the wars of Italian unification. Instead, the ships were laid up and the sailors conscripted to man them were sent home. Some time after 1866, the ship was rebuilt as a central battery ship, with most of her guns located in a central, armored casemate. Two other guns were placed in the bow as chase guns, with a third mounted as a stern chaser. At this time, her armament was also revised, to two 220 mm (8.7 in) guns in the bow and nine 8 in guns, four on each broadside and the last in the stern.

By October 1871, Regina Maria Pia had been stationed in La Spezia, along with her sisters Castelfidardo and San Martino, Affondatore, and the new ironclad Roma. Regina Maria Pia was part of the international fleet that assembled at Tessaloniki during the Salonika Incident in May 1876 in response to the murder of the French and German consuls in the city. Regina Maria Pia took part in the launching ceremony for the ironclad Italia on 29 September 1880; also present were the Italian ironclad Principe Amedeo and King Umberto I aboard his yacht, and the British ironclads HMS Monarch (Captain George Tryon) and Thunderer of the Mediterranean Fleet.

Between 1888 and 1890, the ship had her barque rig replaced with military masts. By this time, she had been rearmed with eight 150 mm (6 in) guns in the casemate and several smaller guns for close-range defense against torpedo boats. These included five 120 mm (4.7 in) guns, four 57 mm (2.2 in) guns, and eight 37 mm (1.5 in) Hotchkiss revolver cannon. She also received three torpedo tubes. In 1895, Regina Maria Pia was assigned as the harbor guard ship in La Spezia. The ship was stricken from the naval register in 1904 and subsequently broken up for scrap.
