= Italian ironclad Castelfidardo =

Ironclad warship of the Italian Royal Navy

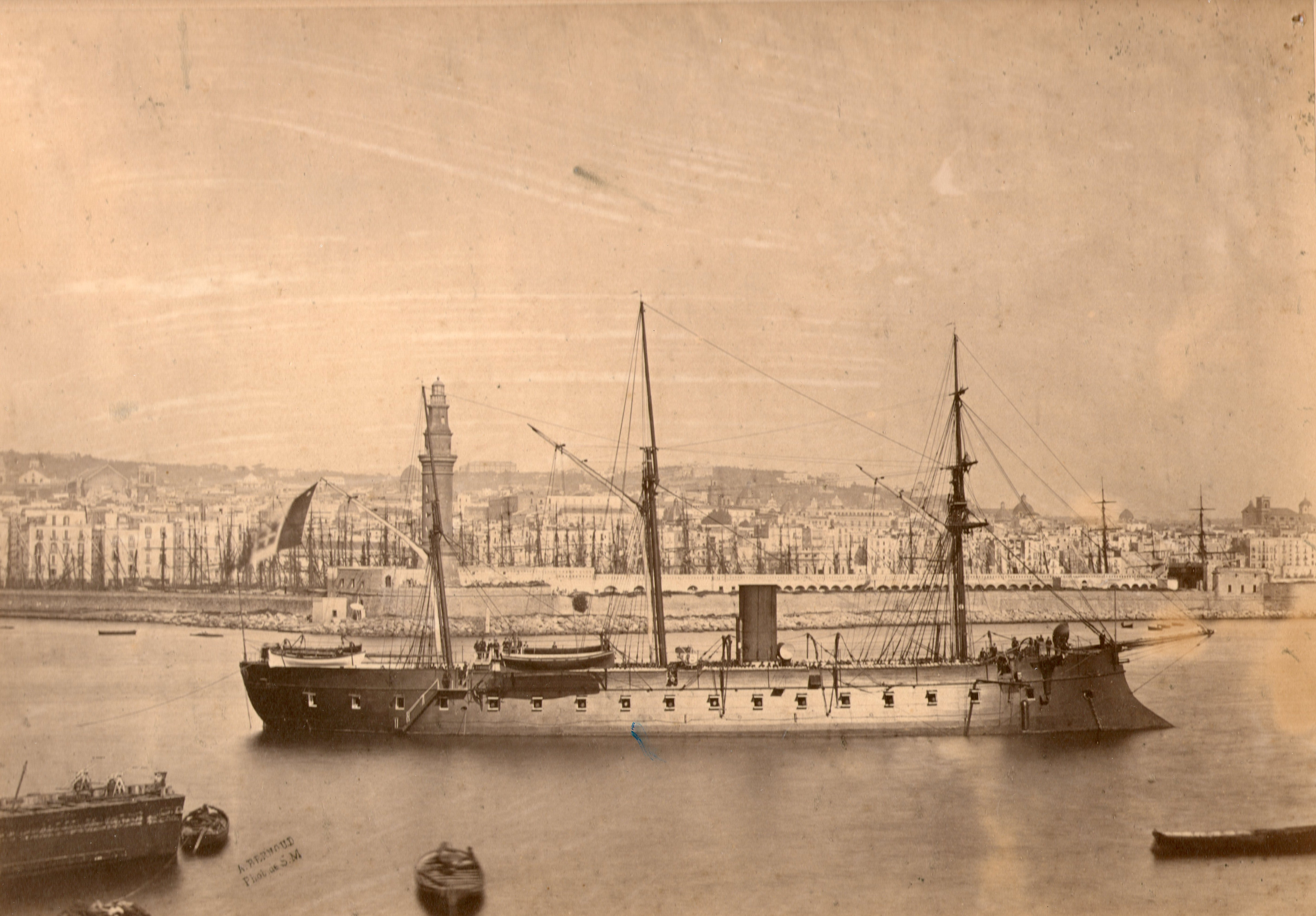
- Castelfidardo in Naples in late 1866

History

Italy
- Name: Castelfidardo
- Namesake: Battle of Castelfidardo
- Builder: Chantiers et Ateliers de l’Océan, Bordeaux
- Laid down: 22 July 1862
- Launched: 1 August 1863
- Completed: May 1864
- Stricken: 1910
- Fate: Broken up

General characteristics
- Class & type: Regina Maria Pia-class ironclad
- Displacement: Normal: 4,192 long tons (4,259 t); Full load: 4,527 long tons (4,600 t)
- Length: 81.8 m (268 ft 4 in)
- Beam: 15.16 m (49 ft 9 in)
- Draft: 6.35 m (20 ft 10 in)
- Installed power: 8 rectangular boilers; 2,125 ihp (1,585 kW)
- Propulsion: 1 × marine steam engine; 1 × screw propeller
- Speed: 12.1 knots (22.4 km/h; 13.9 mph)
- Range: 2,600 nmi (4,800 km) at 10 kn (19 km/h; 12 mph)
- Complement: 480–485
- Armament: 4 × 203 mm (8 in) guns; 22 × 164 mm (6 in) guns
- Armor: Belt armor: 121 mm (4.75 in); Battery: 109 mm (4.3 in)

Castelfidardo was the third of four Regina Maria Pia-class ironclad warships built in French shipyards for the Italian Regia Marina (Royal Navy) in the 1860s. Castelfidardo was laid down in July 1862, was launched in August 1863, and was completed in May 1864. She and her three sister ships were broadside ironclads, mounting a battery of four 203 mm (8 in) and twenty-two 164 mm (6.5 in) guns on the broadside.

Castelfidardo participated in the Battle of Lissa during the Third Italian War of Independence in 1866. She was stationed in the van of the Italian fleet, which became separated from the rest of the fleet and was not heavily engaged. Her career was limited after the war, owing to the emergence of more modern ironclads and a severe reduction in the Italian naval budget following their defeat at Lissa. She was rebuilt as a central battery ship some time after Lissa, and was modernized several more times in the 1870s and 1880s. From 1900 to 1910 she served as a training ship before being broken up for scrap.

== Design ==
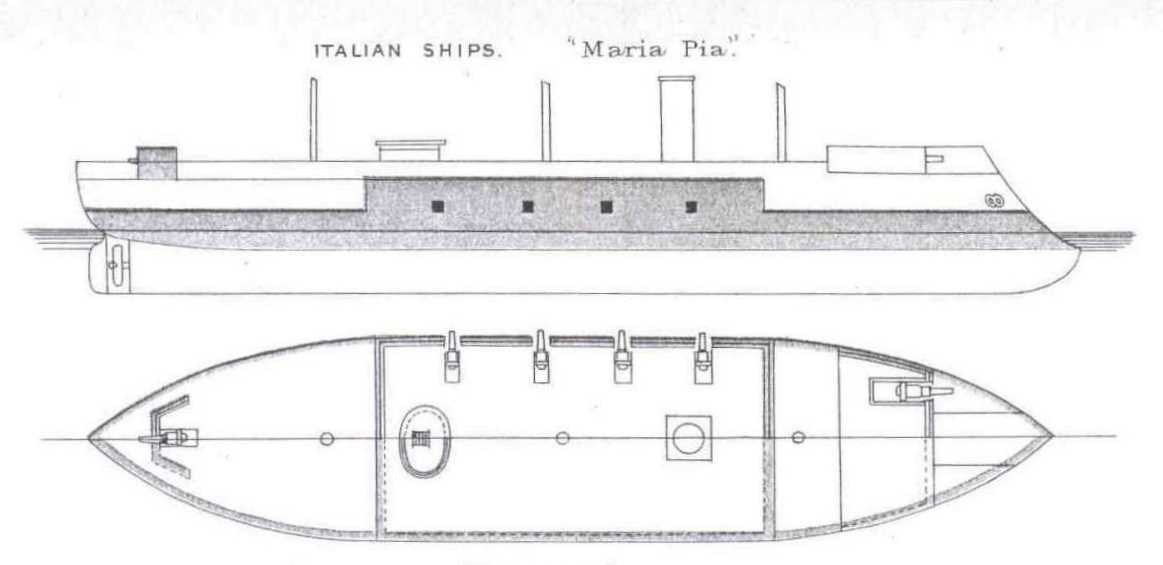
Plan and profile drawing of Regina Maria Pia in her 1888 configuration

In 1862, the Italian Regia Marina (Royal Navy) ordered four new ironclads from French shipyards, in the context of the Austro-Italian ironclad arms race. At the time, the new Kingdom of Italy expected another war with the Austrian Empire, having last fought the Austrians in 1859 during the Second Italian War of Independence. The four Regina Maria Pia-class ships were designed by their French builders, and were completed to slightly varying pairs: Castelfidardo and Ancona; and Regina Maria Pia and San Martino.

Castelfidardo was 81.8 meters (268 ft) long overall; she had a beam of 15.16 m (49.7 ft) and an average draft of 6.35 m (20.8 ft). She displaced 4,192 long tons (4,259 t) normally and up to 4,527 long tons (4,600 t) at full load. The ship had an inverted bow with a pronounced ram below the waterline. She had a crew of 480–485 officers and men.

Her propulsion system consisted of one single-expansion steam engine that drove a single screw propeller. Steam was supplied by eight coal-burning, rectangular fire-tube boilers that were vented through a single funnel. Her engine produced a top speed of 12.1 knots (22.4 km/h; 13.9 mph) from 2,125 indicated horsepower (1,585 kW). She could steam for 2,600 nautical miles (4,800 km; 3,000 mi) at a speed of 10 knots (19 km/h; 12 mph). The ship was initially schooner-rigged to supplement the steam engine, though her masts were later reduced to a barque rig. Ultimately, she lost her sailing rig completely, having it replaced with a pair of military masts with fighting tops.

Castelfidardo was a broadside ironclad, and she was initially armed with a main battery of four 203 mm (8 in) guns and twenty-two 164 mm (6.5 in) guns, though her armament changed throughout her career. The ship was protected by iron belt armor that was 109 mm (4.3 in) thick and extended for the entire length of the hull at the waterline. The side armor extended up to the battery deck with the same thickness of iron plate.

== Service history ==
Castelfidardo was laid down on 27 July 1862 at the Gouin et Guibert shipyard in St. Nazaire, France. She was launched on 1 August 1863 and completed in May 1864. In June 1866, Italy declared war on Austria, as part of the Third Italian War of Independence, which was fought concurrently with the Austro-Prussian War. The Italian fleet commander, Admiral Carlo Pellion di Persano, initially adopted a cautious course of action; he was unwilling to risk battle with the Austrian Navy, despite the fact that the Austrian fleet was much weaker than his own. Persano claimed he was simply waiting on the ironclad ram Affondatore, en route from Britain, but his inaction weakened morale in the fleet, with many of his subordinates openly accusing him of cowardice.

Rear Admiral Wilhelm von Tegetthoff brought the Austrian fleet to Ancona on June 27, in an attempt to draw out the Italians. At the time, many of the Italian ships were in disarray; several ships did not have their entire armament, and several others had problems with their engines. Castelfidardo was one of the few ironclads fit for action, so she, Regina Maria Pia, San Martino, and Principe di Carignano formed up to prepare to attack Tegetthoff's ships. Persano held a council of war aboard Principe di Carignano to determine whether he should sortie to engage Tegetthoff, but by that time, the Austrians had withdrawn, making the decision moot. The Minister of the Navy, Agostino Depretis, urged Persano to act and suggested the island of Lissa, to restore Italian confidence after their defeat at the Battle of Custoza the previous month. On 7 July, Persano left Ancona and conducted a sweep into the Adriatic, but encountered no Austrian ships and returned on the 13th.

=== Battle of Lissa ===
Map showing the disposition of the fleets on 20 July

On 16 July, Persano took the Italian fleet out of Ancona, bound for Lissa, where they arrived on the 18th. With them, they brought troop transports carrying 3,000 soldiers; the Italian warships began bombarding the Austrian forts on the island, with the intention of landing the soldiers once the fortresses had been silenced. In response, the Austrian Navy sent the fleet under Tegetthoff to attack the Italian ships. Castelfidardo was at that time assigned to the 1st Division, commanded by Admiral Giovanni Vacca, along with the ironclads Ancona and Principe di Carignano, the divisional flagship. After arriving off Lissa on the 18th, Persano ordered the 1st Division to bombard the Austrian fortresses protecting the island, but to retain their steel shells for an expected confrontation with the Austrian fleet. Castelfidardo and Pricipe di Carignano attacked the Magnaremi battery at Port Comiso. Vacca erroneously believed that his ships' guns could not elevate high enough to hit the high fortifications. Persano then sent Vacca's division to Vis to force the harbor defenses, but by the time they arrived, night was approaching, and so he cancelled the attack.

The next morning, Persano ordered the ironclad Formidabile to enter the harbor Vis and attack the Madonna battery, supported by Castelfidardo and the rest of the 1st Division. Vacca found it impossible to employ his ships in the confined waters, and they received heavy fire from the Austrian guns. After Ancona received particularly damaging hits and was set on fire, Vacca broke off and withdrew the three ironclads, leaving Formidabile to handle the battery. Later that evening, Vacca took Principe di Carignano, Castelfidardo, and Anconca back to Comisa, but he did little more than probe the bay before Austrian fire prompted his withdrawal. With the day's attacks again having yielded no results, Persano met with his senior officers to discuss options. His chief of staff, d'Amico, and Vacca both suggested a withdrawal owing to the shortage of coal, but Persano ruled that out. He ultimately decided to make another attempt on the 20th. Vacca would take his three ships to patrol to the north-east of the island while the rest of the fleet would again try to land the soldiers.

Before the Italians could begin the attack, but after the fleet had begun to disperse for the landing operation, the dispatch boat Esploratore arrived, bringing news of Tegetthoff's approach. Persano's fleet was in disarray; Vacca's ships were three miles to the northeast from Persano's main force, and three other ironclads were further away to the west. Persano immediately ordered his ships to form up with Vacca's, first in line abreast formation, and then in line ahead formation. Castelfidardo initially reported trouble with her engines, but her crew was able to repair them before the battle began.

Shortly before the action began, Persano left his flagship, Re d'Italia, and transferred to the turret ship Affondatore, though none of his subordinates on the other ships were aware of the change. They there thus left to fight as individuals without direction. More dangerously, by stopping Re d'Italia, he allowed a significant gap to open up between Vacca's three ships and the rest of the fleet. Tegetthoff took his fleet through the gap between Vacca's and Persano's ships, in an attempt to split the Italian line and initiate a melee. He failed to ram any Italian vessels on the first pass, so he turned back toward Persano's ships, and took Re d'Italia, San Martino, and Palestro under heavy fire. Vacca turned Principe di Carignano and Castelfidardo to port, taking them away from the Austrian ships hammering Persano's division. He briefly attempted to engage the Austrian wooden ships in the rear, but was driven off by heavy fire from three steam frigates.

Castelfidardo, Principe di Carignano, and the coastal defense ship Varese engaged the wooden ship of the line Kaiser, but failed to inflict fatal damage to her before she withdrew. By this time, Re d'Italia had been rammed and sunk, and Palestro had been set on fire, soon to be destroyed by a magazine explosion. Persano broke off the engagement, and though his ships still outnumbered the Austrians, Persano refused to counter-attack with his badly demoralized forces. The Italian fleet began to withdraw, followed by the Austrians; as night began to fall, the opposing fleets disengaged completely, heading for Ancona and Pola, respectively. Castelfidardo had emerged from the battle relatively unscathed, though the captain's cabin had been set on fire by an Austrian shell. After the battle, Vacca replaced Persano; he was ordered to attack the main Austrian naval base at Pola, but the war ended before the operation could be carried out.

=== Later career ===
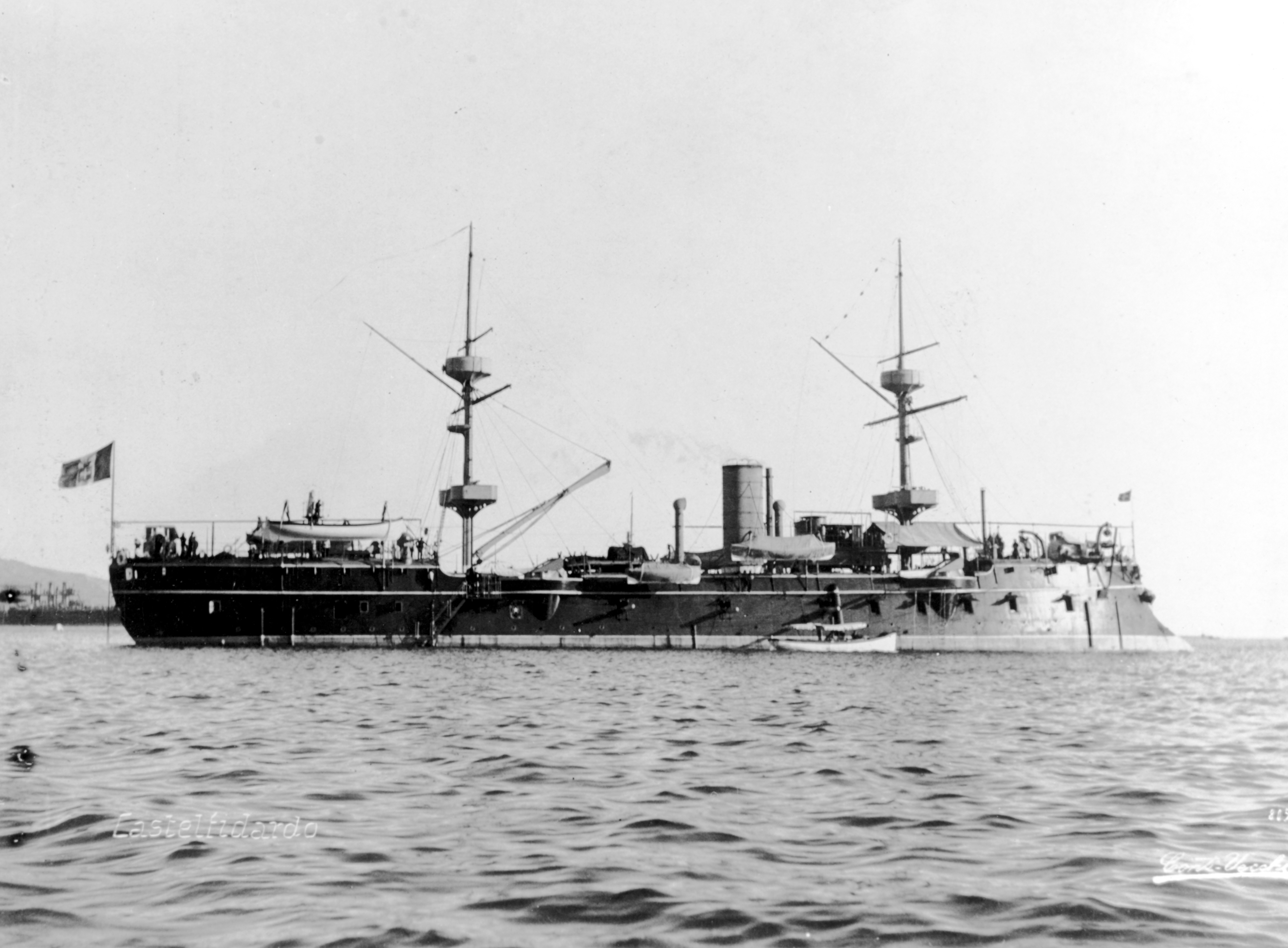
Castelfidardo in the 1880s

For the rest of her long career, Castelfidardo served in a variety of roles, both in the main fleet and in Italy's colonial empire. After the end of the war, the government lost confidence in the fleet and drastically reduced the naval budget. The cuts were so severe that the fleet had great difficulty in mobilizing its ironclad squadron to attack the port of Civitavecchia in September 1870, as part of the wars of Italian unification. Instead, the ships were laid up and the sailors conscripted to man them were sent home. Some time after 1866, the ship was rebuilt as a central battery ship, with most of her guns located in a central, armored casemate. Two other guns were placed in the bow as chase guns, with a third mounted as a stern chaser. Around 1871, her armament was also revised, to two 254 mm (10 in) guns in the bow and eight 8 in guns, four on each broadside. By October that year, she was stationed in La Spezia. She was joined there by her sisters Regina Maria Pia and San Martino, Affondatore, and the new ironclad Roma.

By 1880, her armament had been changed another time, with two 220 mm (8.7 in) guns replacing the 254 mm guns, and a ninth 8 in gun being added in the stern. The ship was modernized in 1884, with her armament replaced with eight 152 mm (6 in) guns, six 120 mm (4.7 in) guns, four 57 mm (2.2 in) quick firing (QF) guns, and eight 37 mm (1.5 in) Hotchkiss revolver cannons. For the annual fleet maneuvers held in 1885, Castelfidardo served in the "Eastern Squadron", joined by the ironclad Principe Amedeo, the corvette Amerigo Vespucci, a sloop, and four torpedo boats. The "Eastern Squadron" defended against an attacking "Western Squadron", simulating a Franco-Italian conflict, with operations conducted off Sardinia. On 10 June, the annual fleet maneuvers began; Castelfidardo was assigned to the "defending squadron", along with the ironclads Enrico Dandolo, Palestro, and Affondatore, the protected cruiser Dogali, and several smaller vessels. The first half of the maneuvers tested the ability to attack and defend the Strait of Messina, and concluded in time for a fleet review by King Umberto I on the 21st.

In 1895, 'Castelfidardo was stationed as the harbor guard ship in La Maddalena. By 1899, Castelfidardo had been assigned to the 2nd Division, which also included the ironclads Affondatore and Sicilia and the torpedo cruisers Partenope and Urania. The following year, she was converted into a torpedo training ship. Her armament now consisted of one 76 mm (3 in) QF gun, one 75 mm (3 in) gun, four 57 mm guns, one 47 mm (1.9 in) gun, two of the 37 mm revolver cannon, and two torpedo tubes. She served in this capacity until she was stricken from the naval register in 1910, thereafter being broken up for scrap.
