= Italian ironclad Palestro =

Ironclad warship of the Italian Royal Navy

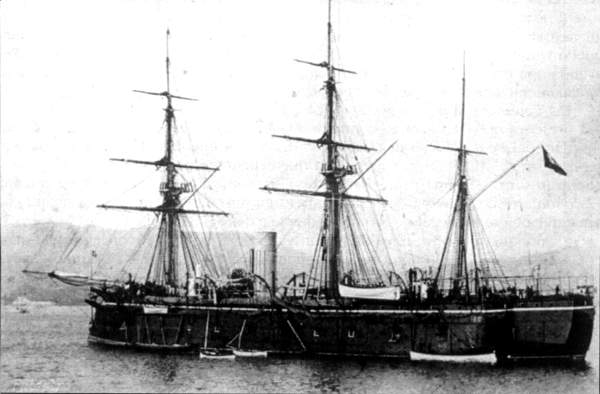
- Palestro at anchor in La Spezia in 1887

History

Italy
- Name: Palestro
- Namesake: Palestro
- Builder: Arsenale di La Spezia
- Laid down: August 1865
- Launched: 30 September or 2 October 1871
- Completed: 11 July 1875
- Stricken: 14 April 1900
- Fate: Scrapped, 1902–1904

General characteristics
- Class & type: Principe Amedeo-class ironclad
- Displacement: Normal: 5,761 long tons (5,853 t); Full load: 6,318 long tons (6,419 t)
- Length: 78.82 m (258 ft 7 in)
- Beam: 17.3 m (56 ft 9 in)
- Draft: 8 m (26 ft 3 in)
- Installed power: 6 fire-tube boilers; 6,117 ihp (4,561 kW)
- Propulsion: 1 × marine steam engine; 1 × screw propeller
- Speed: 12.85 knots (23.80 km/h; 14.79 mph)
- Range: 1,780 nmi (3,300 km) at 10 kn (19 km/h; 12 mph)
- Complement: 548
- Armament: 6 × 254 mm (10 in) guns; 1 × 279 mm (11 in) gun
- Armor: Belt armor: 221 mm (8.7 in); Casemate: 140 mm (5.5 in); Conning tower: 61 mm (2.4 in)

Palestro was an ironclad warship, the second and final member of the Principe Amedeo class, built for the Italian Regia Marina (Royal Navy) in the 1860s and 1870s. She was armed with a battery of six 254 mm (10 in) guns and one 279 mm (11 in) gun. The last sail-rigged ironclad of the Italian fleet, she had a single steam engine that was capable of propelling the ship at a speed of slightly over 12 knots (22 km/h; 14 mph).

Obsolescent before she entered service, Palestro had an uneventful career. She served primarily in Italy's colonial empire and did not see action. In 1880, she took part in an international naval demonstration off Ragusa to enforce the Treaty of Berlin. Palestro was employed in the defense of La Maddalena from 1889 to 1894, and thereafter as a training ship. She was stricken from the naval register in 1900 and broken up for scrap in 1902–1904.

== Design ==
Plan and profile drawing of Palestro

Following the unification of Italy in early 1861, the new Regia Marina (Royal Navy) embarked on a naval construction program that sparked the Austro-Italian ironclad arms race. Expecting another war with the Austrian Empire, the Italians built or purchased sixteen ironclads between 1860 and 1865; the last of these were the Principe Amedeo class. They were also the first central battery ships designed for the Italian fleet. An improved version of the preceding Roma class, they were nevertheless obsolete by the time they entered service.

Palestro was 78.82 meters (258 ft 7 in) long between perpendiculars; she had a beam of 17.3 m (56 ft 9 in) and an average draft of 8 m (26 ft 3 in). She displaced 5,761 long tons (5,853 t) normally and up to 6,318 long tons (6,419 t) at full load. Her superstructure consisted of a small conning tower. She had a crew of 548 officers and men.

Her propulsion system consisted of one single-expansion steam engine that drove a single screw propeller, with steam supplied by six coal-fired, cylindrical fire-tube boilers that were vented through a single funnel placed directly aft of the conning tower. Her engine produced a top speed of 12.85 knots (23.80 km/h; 14.79 mph) at 6,117 indicated horsepower (4,561 kW). She carried up to 580 t (570 long tons; 640 short tons) of coal, allowing her to steam for 1,780 nautical miles (3,300 km; 2,050 mi) at a speed of 10 knots (19 km/h; 12 mph). The ship was barque-rigged to supplement the steam engine; Palestro and her sister were the last rigged ironclads to be built by Italy.

Palestro was armed with a main battery of six 10 in (254 mm) guns, mounted in three armored casemates. The first was located forward, toward the bow, the second and third were placed close to the stern on each side of the ship. A 11 in (279 mm) gun was mounted forward as a bow chaser. Palestro was protected by iron belt armor that was 8.7 in (221 mm) thick and extended for the entire length of the hull. The casemates were protected with 5.5 in (140 mm) of iron plating, and the small conning tower had 2.4 in (61 mm) thick iron plates.

== Service history ==
The keel for Palestro was laid down at the Regio Cantiere di Castellammare di Stabia shipyard in August 1865. The ship was named for the gunboat Palestro, which had been sunk at the Battle of Lissa in 1866. The date of her launching is unknown, though surviving records indicate either 30 September or 2 October 1871. The ship was completed on 11 July 1875, after almost a decade of work. Obsolescent by the time she was completed, Palestro primarily served in the Italian colonial empire, which Italy had begun acquiring in the 1880s. She occasionally took part in training maneuvers with the main Italian fleet throughout her career.

On 14 November 1880 she assisted with the refloating of the P&O steamship Sumatra, which had run aground at Brindisi. Also in that month, Palestro and the ironclad Roma took part in a naval demonstration off Ragusa in an attempt to force the Ottoman Empire to comply with the terms of the Treaty of Berlin and turn over the town of Ulcinj to Montenegro. Palestro was used as a headquarters ship for the ships defending La Maddalena from 1889 to 1894. She was then used as a training ship for coxswains. Palestro was stationed in La Spezia in 1895 as a special service ship. The ship was stricken from the naval register on 14 April 1900 and broken up for scrap between 1902 and 1904.
