= Roma-class ironclad =

Ironclad warship class of the Italian Royal Navy

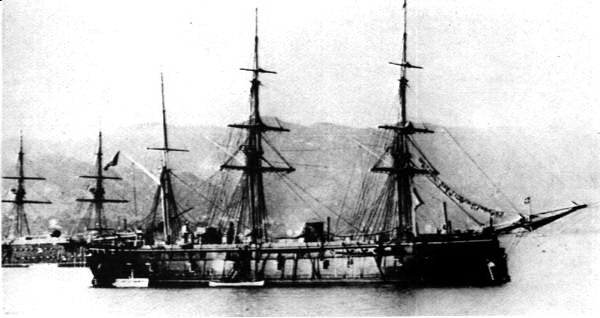
- Roma at anchor in September 1870

Class overview
- Name: Roma class
- Builders: Cantiere della Foce
- Operators: Regia Marina
- Preceded by: Regina Maria Pia class
- Succeeded by: Affondatore
- Built: 1863–1873
- In commission: 1869–1895
- Completed: 2
- Retired: 2

General characteristics (Note: Figures are for Roma)
- Type: Ironclad warship
- Displacement: Normal: 5,698 long tons (5,789 t); Full load: 6,151 long tons (6,250 t)
- Length: 79.67 m (261 ft 5 in)
- Beam: 17.33 m (56 ft 10 in)
- Draft: 7.57 m (24 ft 10 in)
- Installed power: 6 fire-tube boilers; 3,670 ihp (2,737 kW)
- Propulsion: 1 × marine steam engine; 1 × screw propeller
- Speed: 13 knots (24 km/h; 15 mph)
- Range: 1,940 nmi (3,590 km) at 10 kn (19 km/h; 12 mph)
- Complement: 549–551
- Armament: 5 × 254 mm (10 in) guns; 12 × 203 mm (8 in) guns
- Armor: Belt armor: 150 mm (5.9 in)

The Roma class was a pair of ironclad warships built for the Italian Regia Marina (Royal Navy) in the 1860s and 1870s. The class comprised two ships, Roma and Venezia. Roma was a broadside ironclad armed with five 254 mm (10 in) and twelve 203 mm (8 in) guns, while Venezia was converted into a central battery ship during construction, armed with a much more powerful battery of eighteen 10-inch guns. Neither ship had an eventful career, due in large part to their rapid shift to obsolescence. Venezia and Roma were withdrawn from service for auxiliary duties in 1880 and 1890, respectively. Both were stricken from the naval register in 1895 and broken up for scrap the following year, Roma having been badly damaged in a fire in 1895.

== Design ==
The Roma class was designed by Insp. Eng. Giuseppe De Luca, who initially planned to build both ships as broadside ironclads, during the Austro-Italian ironclad arms race. By this time, however, other navies had begun to build central battery ships, which concentrated a smaller number of guns in an armored casemate that had limited capability for end-on fire. This change allowed the ship to be shorter, which in turn required less armor and made the ship more maneuverable. As a result, De Luca re-designed the second ship of the class, Venezia, into a central battery ironclad while she was under construction.

=== General characteristics and machinery ===
The ships of the Roma class had wooden hulls, though they did incorporate some iron in their construction. The two ships varied slightly in their dimensions, a result of Venezia having been converted into a central battery ship during construction. Roma was 79.67 meters (261.4 ft) long between perpendiculars; she had a beam of 17.33 m (56.9 ft) and an average draft of 7.57 m (24.8 ft). Venezia was 79.65 m (261.3 ft) between perpendiculars, with a beam of 17.48 m (57.3 ft) and a draft of 7.6 m (25 ft). Roma displaced 5,698 long tons (5,789 t) normally, while Venezia displaced 5,722 long tons (5,814 t). Both ships displaced 6,151 long tons (6,250 t) at full load. The ships had a crew of 549–551 officers and men.

The ships' propulsion system consisted of one single-expansion steam engine that drove a single screw propeller, with steam supplied by six coal-fired, cylindrical fire-tube boilers. The boilers were trunked into a single funnel amidships. The engines produced a top speed of 13 knots (24 km/h; 15 mph) from 3,670 indicated horsepower (2,740 kW). Each ship had a capacity of 580 t (570 long tons; 640 short tons) of coal for the boilers, which allowed them to steam for 1,940 nautical miles (3,590 km; 2,230 mi) at a speed of 10 knots (19 km/h; 12 mph). The ships were fitted with a three-masted barque rig to supplement the steam engine for long-distance cruising. Each ship had 31,833 square feet (2,957.4 m^{2}) of sail area.

=== Armament and armor ===
Roma was a broadside ironclad, and she was armed with a main battery of five 254 mm (10 in) guns and twelve 203 mm (8 in) guns. Venezia was completed as a central battery ship, with a battery of eighteen 254 mm guns placed in an armored casemate. Both ships had their armament revised throughout their careers. In 1874–75, the ships' batteries were replaced with eleven 254 mm guns for Roma and eight 254 mm and one 220 mm (8.7 in) for Venezia. From 1886, Roma carried eleven 220 mm guns; four years later her armament was reduced to five 8 in guns. Venezia was converted into a training ship in 1881, and was equipped with four 75 mm (3 in) guns and four 57 mm (2.2 in) guns.

Both ships were protected by wrought iron belt armor that was 150 mm (5.9 in) thick and extended for the entire length of the hull at the waterline. Venezia's casemate had 121 mm (4.75 in) of wrought iron protecting the guns.

== Ships ==
Construction data
Name	Builder	Laid down	Launched	Completed
Roma	Cantiere della Foce	February 1863	18 December 1865	May 1869
Venezia	Cantiere della Foce	February 1863	21 January 1869	1 April 1873

== Service history ==
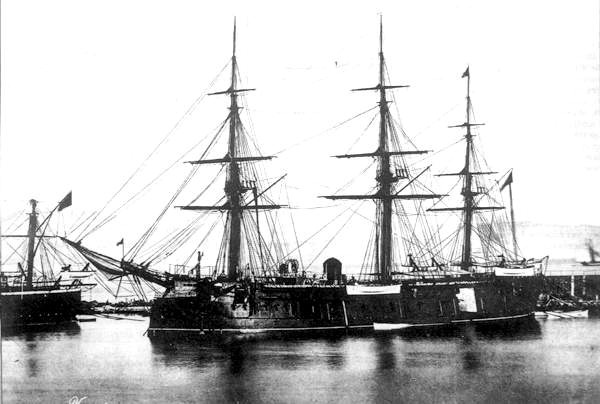
Venezia at anchor in 1876

The two ships, completed too late to see action in the Third Italian War of Independence, had uneventful careers. Roma was obsolescent by the time she entered service, having been superseded by more advanced central battery ships. Venezia was modified during construction into a central battery ship, but the changes necessitated lengthy delays. Ironically, by the time she was completed, the Italian navy had moved on to yet further advanced turret ships like the Duilio class. Roma was mobilized during the Franco-Prussian War, during which Italy took advantage of the French defeat to seize Rome. Roma and the rest of the fleet was to attack the port of Civitavecchia, but the fleet was unable to assemble sufficient forces for the operation.

In 1880, Roma took part in a naval demonstration off Ragusa in an attempt to force the Ottoman Empire to comply with the terms of the Treaty of Berlin and turn over the town of Ulcinj to Montenegro. The following year, she was involved in a collision with the ironclad Principe Amedeo, though neither ship was damaged. That year, Venezia was converted into a torpedo training ship, while Roma remained in service until 1890, when she became a guard ship at La Spezia. In 1895, both ships were stricken from the naval register. Venezia was broken up for scrap the following year, but Roma was converted into a depot ship in La Spezia. On 28 July 1896, she was set on fire by a lightning strike and badly burned. The damage proved to be beyond economical repair, and so she was broken up for scrap.
