= Regina Maria Pia-class ironclad =

Ironclad warship class of the Italian Royal Navy

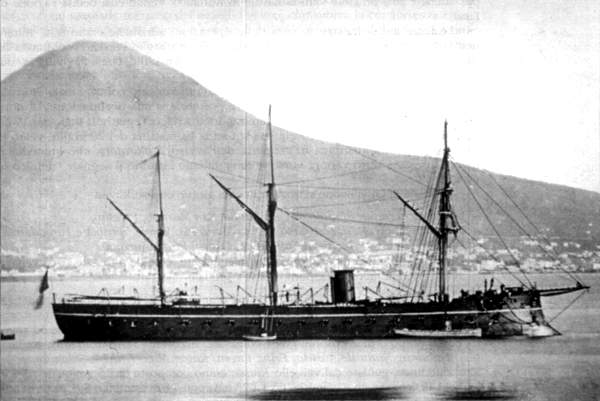
- Regina Maria Pia c. 1870

Class overview
- Name: Regina Maria Pia class
- Builders: Forges et Chantiers de la Méditerranée (2); Gouin et Guibert (1); Chantiers Arman (1)
- Operators: Regia Marina
- Preceded by: Re d'Italia class
- Succeeded by: Roma class
- Built: 1862–1866
- In commission: 1864–1910
- Completed: 4
- Retired: 4

General characteristics (Note: Figures are for Regina Maria Pia)
- Type: Ironclad warship
- Displacement: Normal: 4,201 long tons (4,268 t); Full load: 4,527 long tons (4,600 t)
- Length: 81.2 m (266 ft 5 in)
- Beam: 15.24 m (50 ft)
- Draft: 6.35 m (20 ft 10 in)
- Installed power: 6 rectangular boilers; 2,924 ihp (2,180 kW)
- Propulsion: 1 × marine steam engine; 1 × screw propeller
- Speed: 12.96 knots (24.00 km/h; 14.91 mph)
- Range: 2,600 nmi (4,800 km) at 10 kn (19 km/h; 12 mph)
- Complement: 480–485
- Armament: 4 × 203 mm (8 in) guns; 22 × 164 mm (6 in) guns
- Armor: Belt armor: 121 mm (4.75 in); Battery: 109 mm (4.3 in)

The Regina Maria Pia class was a group of four ironclad warships built for the Italian Regia Marina (Royal Navy) in the 1860s. The class comprised four ships, Regina Maria Pia, San Martino, Castelfidardo, and Ancona. They were built by French shipyards, since Italian yards were unable to meet the demand of the rapidly expanding Italian fleet. The ships were broadside ironclads and mounted a battery of twenty-six muzzle loading guns.

All four ships saw action at the Battle of Lissa during the Third Italian War of Independence in 1866. Regina Maria Pia was badly burned in the battle, but the other three vessels were not seriously damaged. The ships served in a variety of roles for the remainder of their long careers; they were modernized in the late 1880s and thereafter used as a training ships. Regina Maria Pia, San Martino, and Ancona were discarded in 1903–1904, and Castelfidardo joined them in the breaker's yard in 1910.

== Design ==
Following the unification of Italy in 1861, the new Regia Marina (Royal Navy) began a construction program to prepare a fleet of ironclad warships capable of defeating the Austrian Navy, initiating the Austro-Italian ironclad arms race. Italy considered the Austrian Empire to be its main rival, since it controlled predominantly Italian areas, including Venice. The nascent Italian shipyards were incapable of building the number of ships the new fleet would require, so most of this first generation of ironclads were built by foreign ship builders. In 1862, the four ships of the Regina Maria Pia class were ordered from French shipyards, under the direction of Vice Admiral Carlo Pellion di Persano, then the Italian Navy Minister. These ships were designed by the French builders.

=== General characteristics and machinery ===
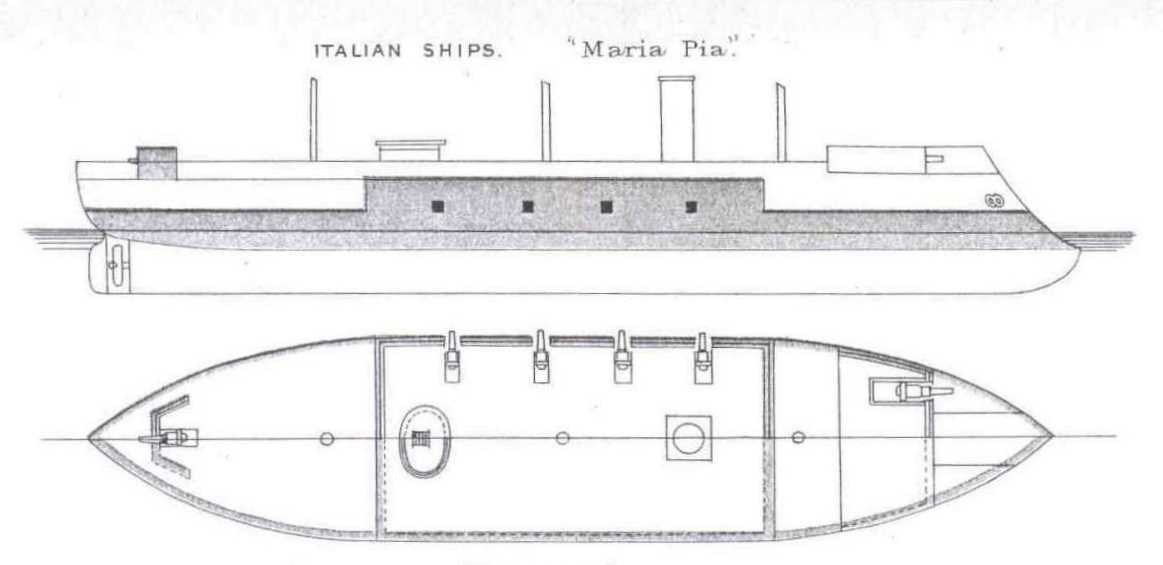
Plan and profile drawing of Regina Maria Pia in her 1888 configuration

The ships of the Regina Maria Pia class varied in their dimensions. Regina Maria Pia and San Martino, built by the same shipyard, were identical in size, while Castelfidardo and Ancona, though each built by different shipyards, also were identical. The first two ships were 75.48 meters (247.6 ft) long between perpendiculars and 81.2 m (266 ft) long overall, and they had a beam of 15.24 m (50.0 ft) and an average draft of 6.35 m (20.8 ft). Castelfidardo and Ancona were 76 m (249 ft) between perpendiculars and 81.8 m (268 ft) overall, with a beam of 15.16 m (49.7 ft) and a draft of 6.35 m. The first two ships displaced 4,201 long tons (4,268 t) normally and up to 4,527 long tons (4,600 t) at full load, while Castelfidardo displaced 4,191 long tons (4,258 t) normally and 4,527 long tons (4,600 t) at full load. Curiously, Ancona was the lightest ship normally, at 4,157 long tons (4,224 t), but the heaviest at full load, at 4,619 long tons (4,693 t).

The ships were constructed with iron hulls. They had an inverted bow with a pronounced ram below the waterline. They were protected by iron belt armor that was 4.75 inches (121 mm) thick and extended for the entire length of the hull at the waterline. The battery deck was protected by 4.3 in (109 mm) of iron plate. Each vessel had a crew of 480–485 officers and men. The ships were initially schooner-rigged to supplement the steam engine, though their masts were later reduced to a barque rig. Ultimately, they lost their sailing rig completely, having it replaced with a pair of military masts with fighting tops.

The ships' propulsion system consisted of one single-expansion, two-cylinder steam engine that drove a single screw propeller, with steam supplied by six coal-fired, rectangular fire-tube boilers. The boilers were trunked into a single funnel placed amidships. Her engine produced a top speed of 12.96 knots (24.00 km/h; 14.91 mph) from 2,924 indicated horsepower (2,180 kW). Each ship had a capacity of 485 long tons (493 t) of coal, which allowed them to steam for 2,600 nautical miles (4,800 km; 3,000 mi) at a speed of 10 knots (19 km/h; 12 mph).

=== Armament ===
The Regina Maria Pia class were broadside ironclads, and they were initially armed with a main battery of four 72-pounder smooth-bore 203 mm (8 in) muzzle-loading guns and twenty-two 32-pounder rifled 164 mm (6.5 in) muzzle loaders, though their armament changed throughout her career. Most of these guns were placed on the broadside, but two of the 164 mm guns were mounted in an armored bunker forward and a third was placed in a similar mount at the stern, as chase guns. The ships were also fitted with a ram bow that was 3 m (9.8 ft) long.

In 1871, all four ships were re-armed with two 220 mm (8.7 in) muzzle-loading guns and eight 8 in muzzle-loading guns, with a ninth 8 in gun added in 1880. Regina Maria Pia and San Martino were later re-equipped with eight 152 mm (6 in) quick-firing (QF) guns, five 120 mm (4.7 in) QF guns, four 57 mm (2.2 in) QF guns, and eight 37 mm (1.5 in) Hotchkiss revolver cannon. In 1884, Castelfidardo received the same battery of light guns, though she had a sixth 4.7 in gun. When Ancona was similarly re-armed, she only had two of the 37 mm revolver cannon. All four ships were also equipped with three torpedo tubes, with the exception of Castelfidardo, which received two tubes.

== Ships ==
Construction data
| Name | Builder | Laid down | Launched | Completed |
|---|---|---|---|---|
| Regina Maria Pia | Société Nouvelle des Forges et Chantiers de la Méditerranée | 22 July 1862 | 28 April 1863 | 17 April 1864 |
| San Martino | Société Nouvelle des Forges et Chantiers de la Méditerranée | 22 July 1862 | 21 September 1863 | 9 November 1864 |
| Castelfidardo | Gouin et Guibert | 22 July 1862 | 1 August 1863 | May 1864 |
| Ancona | Arman Brothers | 11 August 1862 | 17 October 1864 | April 1866 |

== Service history ==
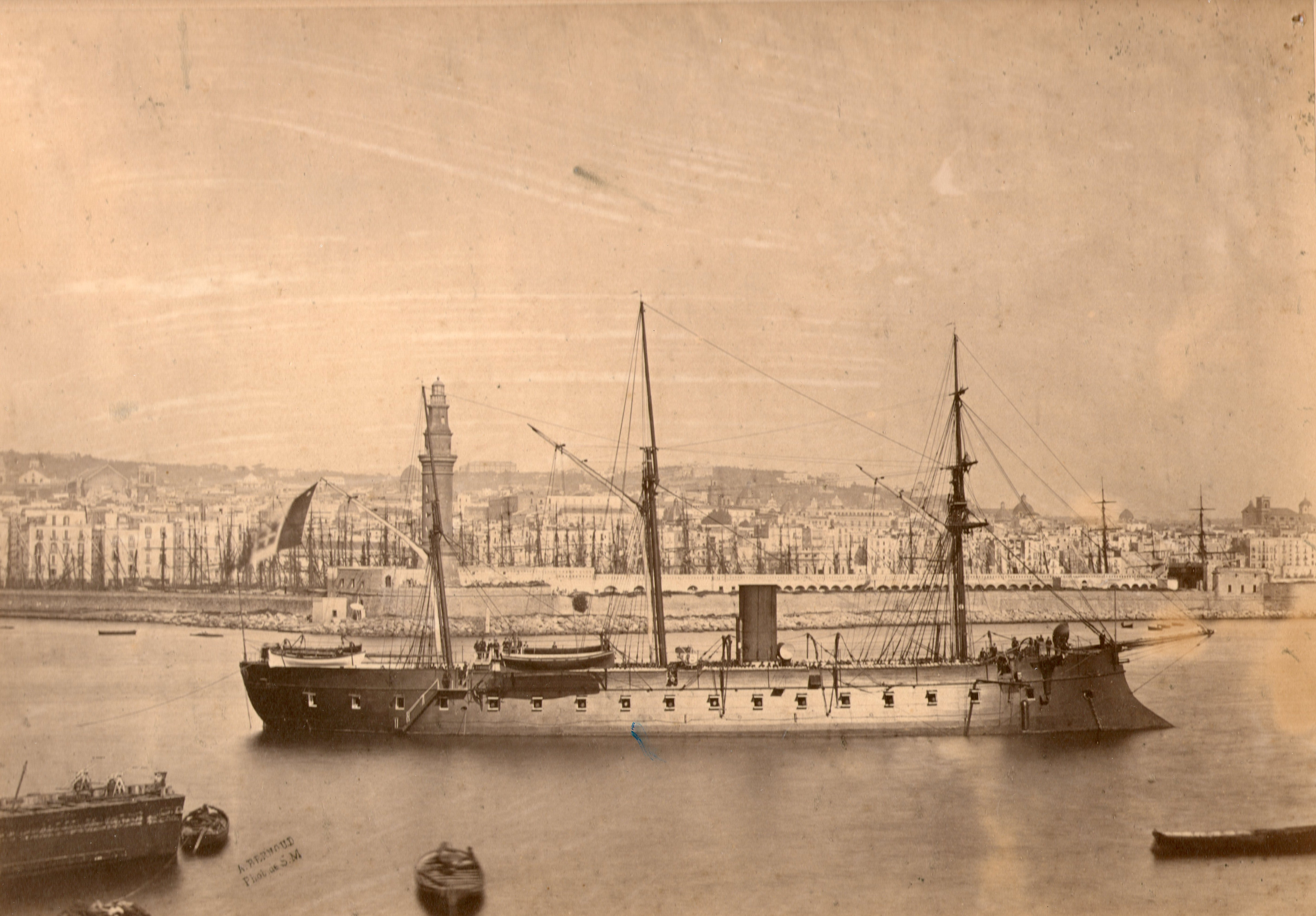
Castelfidardo in Naples in late 1866

All four ships of the class entered service in time to see action during the Third Italian War of Independence against the Austrian Navy in 1866. Persano, now the commander of the Italian fleet, adopted a cautious strategy and conducted only one major offensive operation, which was directed at the island of Lissa. There, the Austrian fleet under Wilhelm von Tegetthoff attacked the Italians. The four Regina Maria Pias all took part in the ensuing Battle of Lissa. Regina Maria Pia had been set on fire and badly burned in the battle, and minor fires were started by Austrian shells aboard San Martino and Castelfidardo, but neither were seriously damaged. Ancona emerged relatively unscathed, with only minor damage to her iron plates.

After the war, the Italian naval budget was slashed; the cuts were so severe that the fleet had great difficulty in mobilizing its ironclad squadron to attack the port of Civitavecchia in September 1870, as part of the wars of Italian unification. Instead, the ships were laid up and the sailors conscripted to man them were sent home. As the Italian fleet began to rebuild in the 1870s, the Regina Maria Pias returned to active service in a variety of roles, both in the main fleet and in Italy's overseas empire. All four ships were modernized in the late 1880s, and were thereafter used as training ships. Regina Maria Pia, Ancona, and San Martino were stricken from the naval register in 1903–1904, while Castelfidardo lingered on as a torpedo training ship until 1910, when she too was sold for scrapping.
