= Headquarters ship =

During the Second World War, the Royal Navy commissioned several headquarters ships (HQS; sometimes referred to as Landing Ship Headquarters), which were responsible for communication between aircraft, ships and shore during amphibious operations. The first such recognised ship was HMS Bulolo.

During the Second World War, four Landing Ships Headquarters (Large) (or LSH(L)s) were commissioned into the Royal Navy.

- HMS Bulolo - formerly the MV Bulolo requisitioned from Burns Philps. Served as the LSH for Gold during the Normandy Landings.
- HMS Largs - formerly the French passenger liner MV Charles Plumier and seized by the Royal Navy at Gibraltar. Served as the LSH for Sword during the Normandy Landings.
- HMS Hilary - formerly the RMS Hilary requisitioned from the Booth Steam Ship Company. Served as the LSH for Juno during the Normandy Landings.
- HMS Lothian - formerly the MV City of Edinburgh requisitioned from the Ellerman Line (converted in 1944).

The Royal Navy Captain-class frigates Dacres, Kingsmill and Lawford were converted to headquarters ships ahead of the Normandy landings.

== See also ==
- Command ship
- Ocean boarding vessel
