= Cantiere della Foce =

- Industry: Shipbuilding
- Founded: c. 1800
- Defunct: 1930
- Headquarters: Genoa, Italy

Cantiere della Foce (Shipyard of the Mouth) was an Italian shipyard founded around 1800 in the village of Foce (later absorbed by Genoa) at the mouth of the Bisagno River. It built its first warship in 1804, but shipbuilding was very intermittent until the Kingdom of Sardinia acquired Liguria in 1815.

Attilio Odero acquired the shipyard in 1890, combining it with his other Genoese shipyard, the Cantieri navali Odero. Both shipyards were amalgamated, together with the Ansaldo-San Giorgio shipyard at Muggiano and the armament works of Vickers-Terni into Odero-Terni in 1927. Two years later Odero-Terni bought the Cantiere navale fratelli Orlando of Livorno. The consolidated company became the Società per la Costruzione di Navi, Macchine ed Artiglierie Odero-Terni-Orlando (OTO) (later OTO Melara) in 1929. The shipyard was closed in 1930 and demolished to allow for the expansion of the city of Genoa.

== Bibliography ==
- Brescia, Maurizio (2012). Mussolini's Navy: A Reference Guide to the Regina Marina 1930–45. Annapolis, Maryland: Naval Institute Press. ISBN 978-1-59114-544-8.
