= Conte Verde =

Conte Verde may refer to:

- Amadeus VI, Count of Savoy, nicknamed "Il Conte Verde", a Count of Savoy
- SS Conte Verde, an Italian ocean liner
- Italian ironclad Conte Verde, a Principe di Carignano-class ironclads of the Italian Regia Marina
