= Italian ironclad Principe di Carignano =

Ironclad warship of the Italian Royal Navy

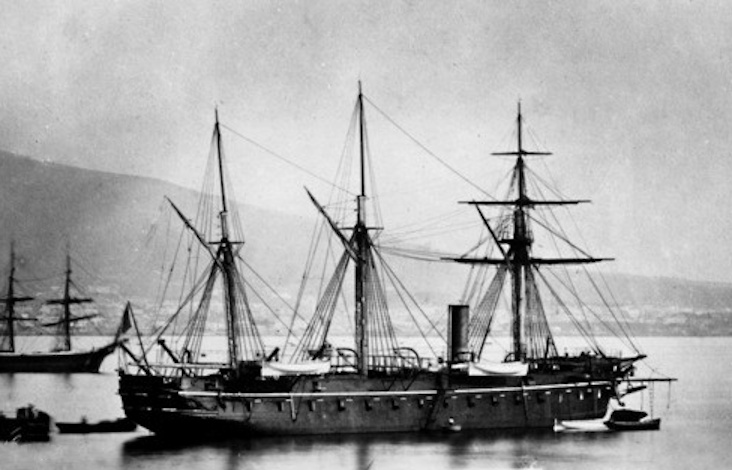
- Principe di Carignano in Naples in 1867

History

Italy
- Name: Principe di Carignano
- Namesake: Prince of Carignano
- Laid down: January 1861
- Launched: 15 September 1863
- Completed: 11 June 1865
- Stricken: 1875
- Fate: Broken up

General characteristics
- Class & type: Principe di Carignano-class ironclad
- Displacement: Normal: 3,446 long tons (3,501 t); Full load: 3,912 long tons (3,975 t)
- Length: 72.89 m (239 ft 2 in)
- Beam: 15.10 m (49 ft 6 in)
- Draft: 7.18 m (23 ft 7 in)
- Installed power: 6 × fire-tube boilers; 1,968 ihp (1,468 kW)
- Propulsion: 1 × marine steam engine; 1 × screw propeller
- Speed: 10.4 knots (19.3 km/h; 12.0 mph)
- Range: 1,200 nmi (2,200 km) at 10 kn (19 km/h; 12 mph)
- Complement: 572
- Armament: 10 × 203 mm (8 in) guns; 12 × 164 mm (6 in) guns
- Armor: Belt armor: 121 mm (4.75 in)

Principe di Carignano was the lead ship of the Principe di Carignano class of ironclad warships built for the Italian Regia Marina in the 1860s. She was the first ironclad built in Italy; her keel was laid January 1861, her hull was launched in September 1863, and she was completed in June 1865. Principe di Carignano was a broadside ironclad armed with a battery of ten 203 mm (8 in) guns and twelve 164 mm (6.5 in) guns.

Principe di Carignano saw action during the Battle of Lissa in 1866 during the Third Italian War of Independence. There, she led the Italian line, the flagship of Admiral Giovanni Vacca; the leading squadron of the Italian fleet became separated from the rest of the fleet and was not heavily engaged. Her career was limited after the war, owing to the emergence of more modern ironclads and a severe reduction in the Italian naval budget following their defeat at Lissa. The ship was stricken from the naval register in 1875 and broken up for scrap to free up funds needed for new ironclads under construction.

== Design ==
In 1861, the newly created Regia Marina (Royal Navy) of the Kingdom of Italy began work on a class of four steam frigates, but while they were under construction, the decision was made to convert three of them into ironclad warships. These became the Principe di Carignano class. The ships were built during a period of increased tension with the Austrian Empire, a traditional opponent of the Italians, which caused both countries to compete in the Austro-Italian ironclad arms race.

Principe di Carignano was 72.98 meters (239 ft 5 in) long between perpendiculars; she had a beam of 15.1 m (49 ft 6 in) and an average draft of 7.18 m (23 ft 7 in). She displaced 3,446 long tons (3,501 t) normally and up to 3,912 long tons (3,975 t) at full load. She had a crew of 572. Her propulsion system consisted of one single-expansion marine steam engine that drove a single screw propeller, with steam supplied by four coal-fired, rectangular fire-tube boilers. Her engine produced a top speed of 10.4 knots (19.3 km/h; 12.0 mph) from 1,968 indicated horsepower (1,468 kW). She could steam for about 1,200 nautical miles (2,200 km; 1,400 mi) at a speed of 10 knots (19 km/h; 12 mph). To supplement her steam engine, the ship was barquentine-rigged.

Principe di Carignano was a broadside ironclad, and she was armed with a main battery of ten 72-pounder 203 mm (8 in) guns and twelve 164 mm (6.5 in) rifled muzzle-loading guns. The ship was equipped with a spur-shaped ram at the bow. The ship's hull was sheathed with wrought iron armor that was 121 mm (4.75 in) thick.

== Service history ==
Ordered by the Royal Sardinian Navy, Principe di Carignano was laid down at the Cantiere della Foce shipyard in Genoa in January 1861, the first Italian ironclad to be domestically produced. By the time she was launched on 15 September 1863, much of Italy had unified, creating the Regia Marina. She was completed on 11 June 1865. She was the only member of her class ready for service by the time the Third Italian War of Independence broke out between Italy and the Austrian Empire in June 1866, which was fought concurrently with the Austro-Prussian War. The Italian fleet commander, Admiral Carlo Pellion di Persano, initially adopted a cautious course of action; he was unwilling to risk battle with the Austrian Navy, despite the fact that the Austrian fleet was much weaker than his own. Persano claimed he was simply waiting on the ironclad ram Affondatore, en route from Britain, but his inaction weakened morale in the fleet, with many of his subordinates openly accusing him of cowardice.

Rear Admiral Wilhelm von Tegetthoff brought the Austrian fleet to Ancona on June 27, in an attempt to draw out the Italians. At the time, many of the Italian ships were in disarray; Principe di Carignano had not yet received her heavy 8-inch guns, and other ships were experiencing various difficulties with their engines or armament. Nevertheless, Principe di Carignano formed up with the ironclads San Martino, Regina Maria Pia, and Castelfidardo in preparation to confront Tegetthoff. Persano held a council of war aboard Principe di Carignano to determine whether he should sortie to engage Tegetthoff, but by that time, the Austrians had withdrawn, making the decision moot. The Minister of the Navy, Agostino Depretis, urged Persano to act and suggested the island of Lissa, to restore Italian confidence after their defeat at the Battle of Custoza the previous month. On 7 July, Persano left Ancona and conducted a sweep into the Adriatic, but encountered no Austrian ships and returned on the 13th.

=== Battle of Lissa ===
Map showing the disposition of the fleets on 20 July

On 16 July, Persano took the Italian fleet out of Ancona, bound for Lissa, where they arrived on the 18th. With them, they brought troop transports carrying 3,000 soldiers; the Italian warships began bombarding the Austrian forts on the island, with the intention of landing the soldiers once the fortresses had been silenced. In response, the Austrian Navy sent the fleet under Tegetthoff to attack the Italian ships. Principe di Carignano was at that time the flagship of Admiral Giovanni Vacca, commander of the 1st Division, along with the ironclads Ancona and Castelfidardo. After arriving off Lissa on the 18th, Persano ordered the 1st Division to bombard the Austrian fortresses protecting the island, but to retain their steel shells for an expected confrontation with the Austrian fleet. Pricipe di Carignano and Castelfidardo attacked the Magnaremi battery at Port Comiso. Principe di Carignano fired some 116 shells and was hit three times by the coastal guns. Vacca erroneously believed that his ships' guns could not elevate high enough to hit the high fortifications. Persano then sent Vacca's division to Vis to force the harbor defenses, but by the time they arrived, night was approaching, and so he cancelled the attack.

The next morning, Persano ordered the ironclad Formidabile to enter Vis harbor and attack the Madonna battery, supported by Principe di Carignano and the rest of the 1st Division. Vacca found it impossible to employ his ships in the confined waters, and they received heavy fire from the Austrian guns. After Ancona received particularly damaging hits and was set on fire, Vacca broke off and withdrew the three ironclads, leaving Formidabile to handle the battery. Later that evening, Vacca took Principe di Carignano, Castelfidardo, and Anconca back to Comisa, but he did little more than probe the bay before Austrian fire prompted his withdrawal. Shortly thereafter, Persano recalled the fleet to a position about 8 nautical miles (15 km; 9.2 mi) from Lissa, where it was to stay through the night. With the day's attacks again having yielded no results, Persano met with his senior officers to discuss options. His chief of staff, d'Amico, and Vacca both suggested a withdrawal owing to the shortage of coal, but Persano ruled that out. He ultimately decided to make another attempt on the 20th. Vacca would take his three ships to patrol to the north-east of the island while the rest of the fleet would again try to land the soldiers.

Before the Italians could begin the attack, but after the fleet had begun to disperse for the landing operation, the dispatch boat Esploratore arrived, bringing news of Tegetthoff's approach. Persano's fleet was in disarray; Vacca's ships were three miles to the northeast from Persano's main force, and three other ironclads were further away to the west. Persano immediately ordered his ships to form up with Vacca's, first in line abreast formation, and then in line ahead formation. Principe di Carignano led the Italian line.

Shortly before the action began, Persano left his flagship, Re d'Italia, and transferred to the turret ship Affondatore, though none of his subordinates on the other ships were aware of the change. They were thus left to fight as individuals without direction. More dangerously, by stopping Re d'Italia, he allowed a significant gap to open up between Vacca's three ships and the rest of the fleet. Principe di Carignano opened fire first at 10:43, at a range of about 1,000 yards (910 m), while the Austrians were approaching the gap. The Italian gunnery was poor, and their initial shooting missed the Austrian ships. Tegetthoff took his fleet through the gap between Vacca's and Persano's ships in an attempt to initiate a melee, though he failed to ram any Italian vessels on the first pass. The Austrians then turned back toward Persano's ships, and took Re d'Italia, San Martino, and the coastal defense ship Palestro under heavy fire. Vacca turned Principe di Carignano and Castelfidardo to port, taking them away from the Austrian ships hammering Persano's division. He briefly attempted to engage the Austrian wooden ships in the rear, but was driven off by heavy fire from three steam frigates.

Principe di Carignano, Castelfidardo, and the coastal defense ship Varese engaged the wooden ship of the line Kaiser, but failed to inflict fatal damage to her before she withdrew. By this time, Re d'Italia had been rammed and sunk, and Palestro had been set on fire, soon to be destroyed by a magazine explosion. Persano broke off the engagement, and though his ships still outnumbered the Austrians, Persano refused to counter-attack with his badly demoralized forces. The Italian fleet began to withdraw, followed by the Austrians; as night began to fall, the opposing fleets disengaged completely, heading for Ancona and Pola, respectively. In the course of the battle, Principe di Carignano had had one of her armor plates shattered by Austrian shells, and one of her guns had exploded. In return, Principe di Carignano hit the Austrian ironclad SMS Drache and killed the ship's commander.

=== Later career ===
After the battle, Vacca replaced Persano; he was ordered to attack the main Austrian naval base at Pola, but the war ended before the operation could be carried out. The ship's postwar career was limited; rapidly surpassed first by central battery and then turret ships, the first generation of ironclads with traditional broadside quickly became obsolete. In addition, the government lost confidence in the fleet after the defeat at Lissa and drastically reduced the naval budget. The cuts were so severe that the fleet had great difficulty in mobilizing its ironclad squadron to attack the port of Civitavecchia in September 1870, as part of the wars of Italian unification. Instead, the ships were laid up and the sailors conscripted to man them were sent home. Around 1870, the ship's armament was revised to four 8 in guns and sixteen 164 cm guns. As of October 1871, she was stationed in Naples, along with her sister ship Messina and the two Formidabile-class ironclads and a number of other vessels.

In 1873, the ship was assigned to the 2nd Division of the main Italian fleet; the other vessels of the division were the screw frigates Gaeta and Principe Umberto. Together with the ships of the 1st Division, the entire squadron cruised in the Mediterranean that year. Principe di Carignano was stricken from the naval register in 1875, and was subsequently broken up for scrap between 1877 and 1897. The Navy discarded both of her sisters, along with the ironclad Re di Portogallo between 1875 and 1880 to remove the cost of maintaining them from the naval budget, as part of an effort to reduce the financial impact of the new Duilio and Italia-classes then under construction.
