= Italian ironclad Messina =

Ironclad warship of the Italian Royal Navy

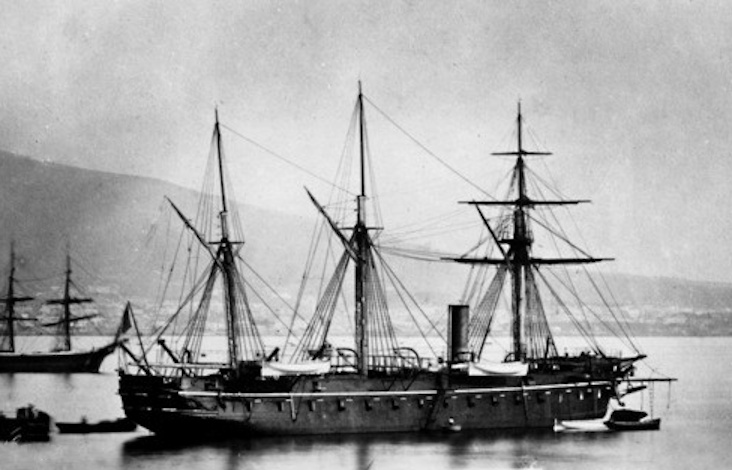
- Messina's sister ship Principe di Carignano in Naples in 1867

History

Italy
- Name: Messina
- Namesake: Messina
- Builder: Regio Cantiere di Castellammare di Stabia
- Laid down: 28 September 1861
- Launched: 20 December 1864
- Completed: February 1867
- Stricken: 1880
- Fate: Broken up

General characteristics
- Class & type: Principe di Carignano-class ironclad
- Displacement: Normal: 3,868 long tons (3,930 t); Full load: 4,245 long tons (4,313 t)
- Length: 72.8 m (238 ft 10 in)
- Beam: 15.10 m (49 ft 6 in)
- Draft: 7.27 m (23 ft 10 in)
- Installed power: × fire-tube boilers; 1,968 ihp (1,468 kW)
- Propulsion: 1 × marine steam engine; 1 × screw propeller
- Speed: 11.4 knots (21.1 km/h; 13.1 mph)
- Range: 1,200 nmi (2,200 km) at 10 kn (19 km/h; 12 mph)
- Complement: 572
- Armament: 4 × 203 mm (8 in) guns; 18 × 164 mm (6 in) guns
- Armor: Belt armor: 121 mm (4.75 in)

Messina was the second of three Principe di Carignano-class ironclads built for the Italian Regia Marina (Royal Navy) in the 1860s. She was laid down in September 1861, her hull was launched in December 1864, and she was completed in February 1867. Messina was a broadside ironclad armed with a battery of four 203 mm (8 in) guns and eighteen 164 mm (6.5 in) guns. Her career was limited, owing to the emergence of more modern ironclads and a severe reduction in the Italian naval budget following their defeat at the Battle of Lissa in 1866. She was discarded in 1875 and sold to ship breakers to help pay for new ironclads then under construction.

== Design ==
In 1861, the newly created Regia Marina (Royal Navy) of the Kingdom of Italy began work on a class of four steam frigates, but while they were under construction, the decision was made to convert three of them into ironclad warships. These became the Principe di Carignano class. The ships were built during a period of increased tension with the Austrian Empire, a traditional opponent of the Italians, which caused both countries to compete in the Austro-Italian ironclad arms race.

Messina was 72.8 meters (238 ft 10 in) long between perpendiculars; she had a beam of 15.1 m (49 ft 6 in) and an average draft of 7.27 m (23 ft 10 in). She displaced 3,868 long tons (3,930 t) normally and up to 4,245 long tons (4,313 t) at full load. She had a crew of 572. Her propulsion system consisted of one single-expansion marine steam engine that drove a single screw propeller, with steam supplied by six coal-fired, cylindrical fire-tube boilers. Her engine produced a top speed of 11.4 knots (21.1 km/h; 13.1 mph) from 1,968 indicated horsepower (1,468 kW), making her the fastest member of her class. She could steam for about 1,200 nautical miles (2,200 km; 1,400 mi) at a speed of 10 knots (19 km/h; 12 mph). To supplement her steam engine, the ship was barque-rigged.

Messina was a broadside ironclad, and she was armed with a main battery of four 72-pounder 203 mm (8 in) guns and eighteen 164 mm (6.5 in) rifled muzzle-loading guns. The ship was equipped with a spur-shaped ram at the bow. The ship's hull was sheathed with wrought iron armor that was 121 mm (4.75 in) thick.

== Service history ==
Messina was ordered by the Royal Sardinian Navy, but by the time she was laid down at the Regio Cantiere di Castellammare di Stabia (Royal Dockyard in Castellammare di Stabia) on 28 September 1861, much of Italy had unified, creating the Regia Marina. She was launched on 20 December 1864 and completed in February 1867. This was too late to see action during the Third Italian War of Independence, which had ended the previous August; Principe di Carignano was the only member of her class to have been completed in time for the war. The conflict nevertheless had a significant effect on Messina's career. The government lost confidence in the fleet after the defeat at the Battle of Lissa and drastically reduced the naval budget. The cuts were so severe that the fleet had great difficulty in mobilizing its ironclad squadron to attack the port of Civitavecchia in September 1870, as part of the wars of Italian unification. Instead, the ships were laid up and the sailors conscripted to man them were sent home.

In addition, Messina was rapidly surpassed first by central battery and then turret ships, which rendered the first generation of ironclads with traditional broadside obsolete. As a result, Messina was not used in any significant way in her ten years in service. In 1870, the ship's armament was revised to six 10 in (254 mm) guns, four 8 in guns, and eight 164 mm guns. That year, Messina was temporarily grounded in the mouth of the Tiber river. She was refloated and repaired by October 1871, at which time the ship was stationed in Naples. Her sister Principe di Carignano, the two Formidabile-class ironclads were also stationed in the port, along with a number of other vessels.

In 1880, the Navy struck Messina from the list of ships and broke her up for scrap. The Navy discarded both of her sisters, along with the ironclad Re di Portogallo between 1875 and 1880 to remove the cost of maintaining them from the naval budget, as part of an effort to reduce the financial impact of the new Duilio and Italia-classes then under construction.
