= Re d'Italia-class ironclad =

Ironclad warship class of the Italian Royal Navy

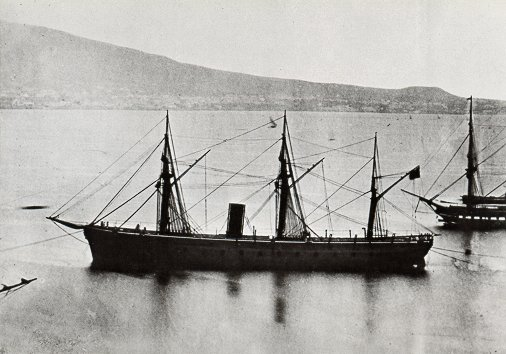
- Re d'Italia or her sister Re di Portogallo

Class overview
- Name: Re d'Italia class
- Builders: William H. Webb
- Operators: Regia Marina
- Preceded by: Principe di Carignano class
- Succeeded by: Regina Maria Pia class
- Built: 1861–1864
- In commission: 1864–1875
- Completed: 2
- Retired: 2

General characteristics (Note: Figures are for Re d'Italia)
- Type: Ironclad warship
- Displacement: Normal: 5,610 long tons (5,700 t); Full load: 5,869 long tons (5,963 t)
- Length: 99.61 m (326 ft 10 in) (o/a)
- Beam: 16.76 m (55 ft)
- Draft: 6.17 m (20 ft 3 in)
- Installed power: 4 × fire-tube boilers; 1,812 to 1,845 ihp (1,351 to 1,376 kW)
- Propulsion: 1 × marine steam engine; 1 × screw propeller
- Sail plan: Barque-rigged
- Speed: 10.6 to 10.8 knots (19.6 to 20.0 km/h; 12.2 to 12.4 mph)
- Range: 1,800 nmi (3,300 km; 2,100 mi) at 12 knots (22 km/h; 14 mph)
- Complement: 565
- Armament: 6 × 72-pounder 203 mm (8 in) smoothbore guns; 32 × 6.5 in (164 mm) rifled muzzle-loaders
- Armor: Belt: 114 mm (4.5 in)

The Re d'Italia class was a pair of ironclad warships built for the Italian Regia Marina (Royal Navy) in the 1860s. The class comprised two ships, Re d'Italia and Re di Portogallo. The two ships were built in the United States, and were based on the French ironclad Gloire; they were armed with a battery of thirty-eight guns in a broadside arrangement and were protected with 120 mm (4.7 in) of wrought iron plating.

Re d'Italia served as the flagship of the Italian fleet until moments before the Battle of Lissa on 20 July 1866; Admiral Carlo Pellion di Persano's hasty transfer to another vessel deprived the fleet of central command, and in the ensuing melee, Re d'Italia was rammed and sunk. Re di Portogallo was also rammed, but was not seriously damaged and she survived the action. The ship remained in service until 1871, when she became a training ship; this service did not last long, as the green wood used to build her hull had badly deteriorated by 1875, so she was sold and broken up for scrap that year.

== Design ==
Following the unification of Italy in 1861, the new Regia Marina (Royal Navy) began a construction program to prepare a fleet of ironclad warships capable of defeating the Austrian Navy, which initiated the Austro-Italian ironclad arms race. Italy considered the Austrian Empire to be its main rival, since it controlled predominantly Italian areas, including Venice. The nascent Italian shipyards were incapable of building the number of ships the new fleet would require, so most of this first generation of ironclads were built by foreign ship builders. In 1861, the two ships of the Re d'Italia class were ordered from the American shipyard owned by William H. Webb, under the direction of General Luigi Federico Menabrea, then the Italian Navy Minister. The design for the ships was based heavily on the contemporary French ironclad Gloire, but they did not meet the high expectations the Italian fleet placed upon them.

=== General characteristics and machinery ===
The ships of the Re d'Italia class were 83.82 meters (275 ft) long between perpendiculars and 99.61 m (326 ft 10 in) long overall and they had a beam of 16.76 m (55 ft). Both ships displaced 5,610 long tons (5,700 t) normally; Re d'Italia displaced up to 5,869 long tons (5,963 t) at full load while Re di Portogallo was heavier, at 6,082 long tons (6,180 t). Their draft at full load was 6.17 m (20 ft 3 in) for Re d'Italia and 7.18 m (23 ft 7 in) for Re di Portogallo. The ships' hulls were built from unseasoned green wood, and were not subdivided with watertight compartments. Re d'Italia had a crew of 565, while Re di Portogallo's crew numbered 552.

The ships' propulsion system consisted of one single-expansion marine steam engine that drove a single screw propeller, with steam supplied by four coal-fired, rectangular fire-tube boilers. The boilers were trunked into a single funnel. Their engines produced a top speed of 10.6 to 10.8 knots (19.6 to 20.0 km/h; 12.2 to 12.4 mph) from 1,812 to 1,845 indicated horsepower (1,351 to 1,376 kW). They could steam for about 1,800 nautical miles (3,300 km; 2,100 mi) at a speed of 10.5 knots (19.4 km/h; 12.1 mph). Steering was controlled through a single rudder, though the ships did not maneuver well. For long-distance travel, the ships were fitted with three masts and were barque-rigged, with a total sail area of 21,317 square feet (1,980.4 m^{2}).

=== Armament and armor ===
The Re d'Italia-class ships were broadside ironclads. Re d'Italia was armed with a main battery of six 72-pounder 203 mm (8 in) guns and thirty-two 164 mm (6.5 in) rifled muzzle-loading guns, while Re di Portogallo had an armament of two 254 mm (10 in) guns and twenty-six 164 mm guns. The ships were equipped with a spur-shaped ram at the bow. In 1870, Re di Portogallo was rearmed with six 203 mm and twelve 164 mm guns in place of her original twenty-six 164 mm guns; she retained the two 10 in guns. The following year, her armament was revised more radically for service as a gunnery training ship, and then consisted of twenty 203 mm guns, two 120 mm (4.7 in) guns, and eight 80 mm (3.1 in) guns. The ships' hulls were sheathed with wrought iron armor above the waterline that was 120 mm thick. Their rudder and propeller, however, were not protected by their armor.

== Ships ==
Construction data
Name	Builder	Laid down	Launched	Completed
Re d'Italia	William H. Webb	21 November 1861	18 April 1863	14 September 1864
Re di Portogallo	William H. Webb	December 1861	29 August 1863	23 August 1864

== Service history ==
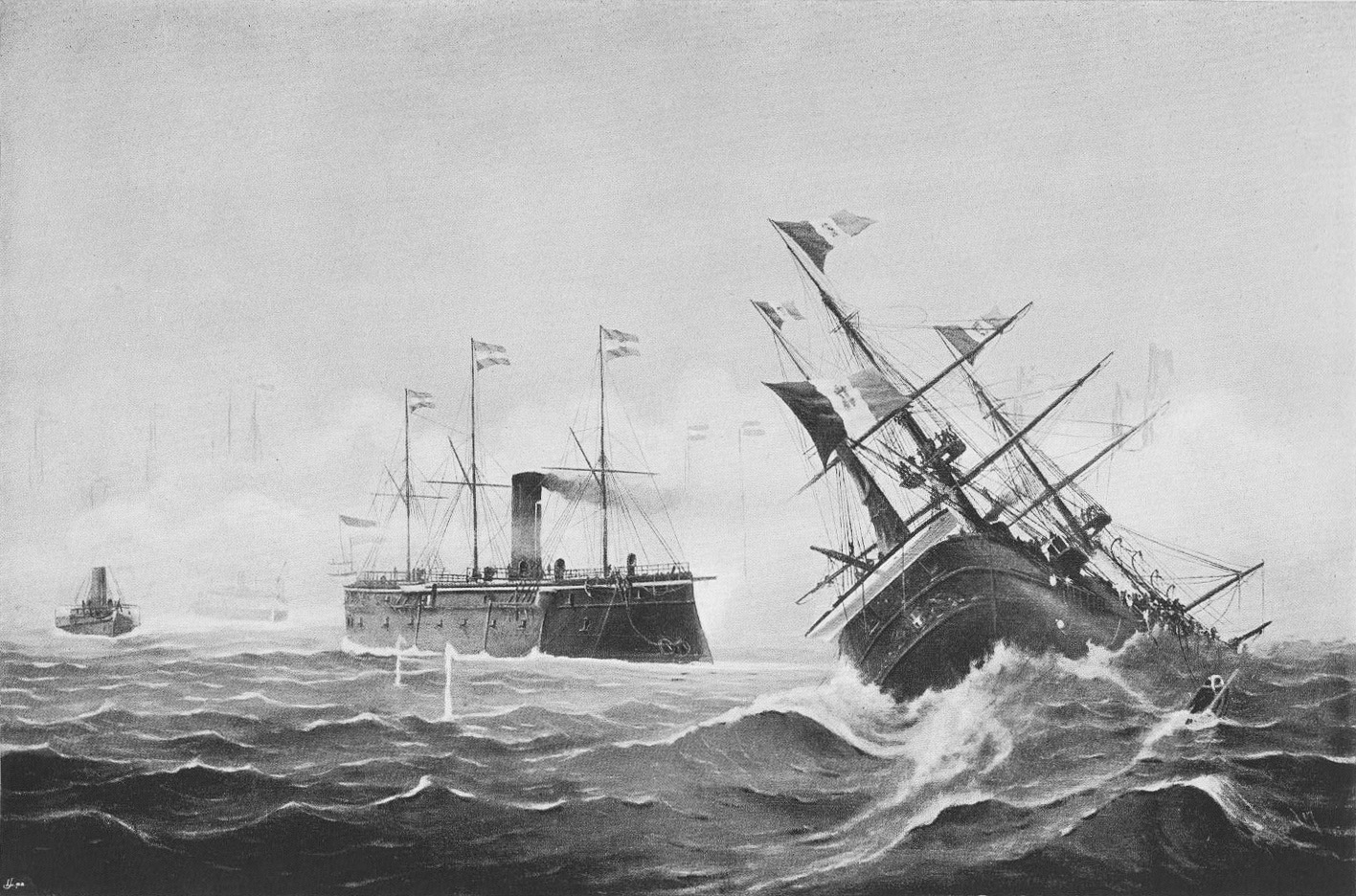
An illustration of Re d'Italia rolling over after having been rammed by Erzherzog Ferdinand Max

The only Italian ironclads to be built in the United States, the two Re d'Italia-class ships formed the core of the Italian armored fleet at the start of the Third Italian War of Independence fought against the Austrian Empire in mid-1866. Re d'Italia and Re di Portogallo served as the flagships of the Second and Third Divisions, with the former also acting as the fleet flagship under Admiral Carlo Pellion di Persano. The war broke out in June 1866, as Italy, which had allied with Prussia, sought to take advantage of the Austro-Prussian War to seize Austrian-controlled Venice.

After initially remaining in port, the Italian fleet launched an attack on the island of Lissa in mid-July; the Austrian fleet under Rear Admiral Wilhelm von Tegetthoff sortied to mount a counterattack, which resulted in the Battle of Lissa on 20 July. Shortly before the two fleets clashed, Persano transferred to the new turret ship Affondatore without informing the fleet, leaving the Italian vessels without effective leadership. In the ensuing melee, Re d'Italia was rammed and sunk by the Austrian flagship, the ironclad SMS Erzherzog Ferdinand Max, with heavy loss of life. Re di Portogallo was also rammed by the wooden ship of the line SMS Kaiser, but was only lightly damaged.

Re di Portogallo was repaired after the battle, and was rearmed in 1870 before becoming a gunnery training ship the following year. In 1875, the Regia Marina sold the ship for scrap, owing to the discovery that the green timbers used to build the hull had badly rotted. In addition, the navy sought to offset the financial impact of the new Duilio and Italia-classes then under construction.
