= Italian ironclad Conte Verde =

Ironclad warship of the Italian Royal Navy

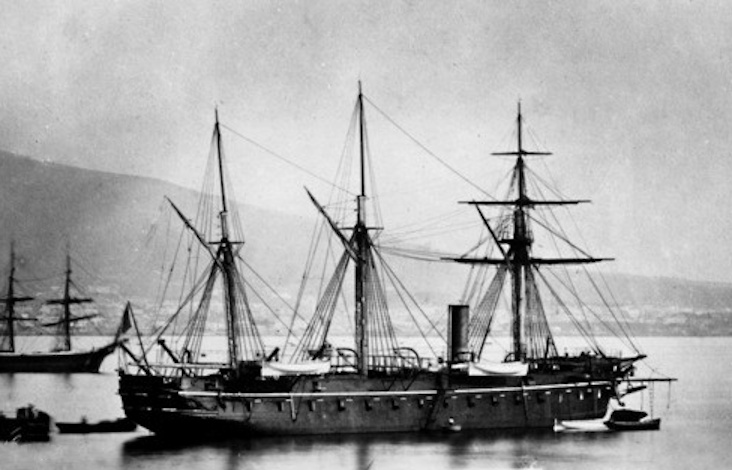
- Conte Verde's sister ship Principe di Carignano in Naples in 1867

History

Italy
- Name: Conte Verde
- Namesake: Amadeus VI, Count of Savoy
- Builder: San Rocco, Livorno
- Laid down: 2 March 1863
- Launched: 29 July 1867
- Completed: December 1871
- Stricken: 1880
- Fate: Broken up

General characteristics
- Class & type: Principe di Carignano-class ironclad
- Displacement: Normal: 3,514 long tons (3,570 t); Full load: 3,866 long tons (3,928 t)
- Length: 73.7 m (241 ft 10 in)
- Beam: 15.3 m (50 ft 2 in)
- Draft: 6.5 m (21 ft 4 in)
- Installed power: 6 × fire-tube boilers; 1,968 ihp (1,468 kW)
- Propulsion: 1 × marine steam engine; 1 × screw propeller
- Speed: 10.2 knots (18.9 km/h; 11.7 mph)
- Range: 1,200 nmi (2,200 km) at 10 kn (19 km/h; 12 mph)
- Complement: 572
- Armament: 4 × 203 mm (8 in) guns; 18 × 164 mm (6 in) guns

Conte Verde was the third of three Principe di Carignano-class ironclads built for the Italian Regia Marina (Royal Navy), though she differed in several respects from her sisters. Unlike the other two members of her class, she did not receive complete iron armor, instead relying on partial plating at her bow and stern. She was laid down in February 1863, she was launched in July 1867, and she was completed in December 1871. Conte Verde was a broadside ironclad armed with a battery of four 203 mm (8 in) guns and eighteen 164 mm (6.5 in) guns. Her career was limited, owing to the emergence of more modern ironclads and a severe reduction in the Italian naval budget following their defeat at the Battle of Lissa in 1866. She was discarded in 1880 and sold to ship breakers to help pay for new ironclads then under construction.

== Design ==
In 1861, the newly created Regia Marina (Royal Navy) of the Kingdom of Italy began work on a class of four steam frigates, but while they were under construction, the decision was made to convert three of them into ironclad warships. These became the Principe di Carignano class, though Conte Verde was completed to a different design that had armor plating only at the bow and stern. The ships were built during a period of increased tension with the Austrian Empire, a traditional opponent of the Italians, which caused both countries to compete in the Austro-Italian ironclad arms race.

Conte Verde was 73.7 meters (241 ft 10 in) long between perpendiculars; she had a beam of 15.3 m (50 ft 2 in) and an average draft of 6.5 m (21 ft 4 in). She displaced 3,514 long tons (3,570 t) normally and up to 3,866 long tons (3,928 t) at full load. She had a crew of 572. Her propulsion system consisted of one single-expansion marine steam engine that drove a single screw propeller, with steam supplied by six coal-fired, cylindrical fire-tube boilers. Her engine produced a top speed of 10.2 knots (18.9 km/h; 11.7 mph) from 1,968 indicated horsepower (1,468 kW), making her the fastest member of her class. She could steam for about 1,200 nautical miles (2,200 km; 1,400 mi) at a speed of 10 knots (19 km/h; 12 mph). To supplement her steam engine, the ship was barque-rigged.

Conte Verde was a broadside ironclad, and she was armed with a main battery of four 72-pounder 203 mm (8 in) guns and eighteen 164 mm (6.5 in) rifled muzzle-loading guns. The ship was equipped with a spur-shaped ram at the bow. Unlike her two sisters, Conte Verde did not have complete iron armor on her sides. She instead had wrought iron armor that covered only parts of her bow and stern. The rest of the ship received traditional timber armor.

== Service history ==
The keel for Conte Verde was laid down at the San Rocco shipyard in Livorno on 2 February 1863. She was launched on 29 July 1867, and was completed in December 1871. The ship did not have a long or particularly active career; rapidly surpassed first by central battery and then turret ships, the first generation of ironclads with traditional broadside quickly became obsolete. In addition, the Italian government lost confidence in the fleet after its defeat in 1866 at the Battle of Lissa and drastically reduced the naval budget. The cuts were so severe that the fleet had great difficulty in mobilizing its ironclad squadron to attack the port of Civitavecchia in September 1870, as part of the wars of Italian unification. Instead, the ships were laid up and the sailors conscripted to man them were sent home.

As a result, Conte Verde saw little use in her nine years in service. In 1873, the ship was assigned to the 1st Division of the main unit of the Italian fleet, the Permanent Squadron; the other vessels of the division were the ironclads Roma and Ancona. Together with the ships of the 2nd Division, the entire squadron cruised in the Mediterranean that year. In February, Conte Verde steamed Portugal to visit the capital, Lisbon. She departed on 4 March and returned to Italy, stopping in Gaeta before arriving in Naples. The ship was stricken from the naval register in 1880, but was not actually broken up for scrap until 1898. The Navy discarded both of her sisters, along with the ironclad Re di Portogallo between 1875 and 1880 to remove the cost of maintaining them from the naval budget, as part of an effort to reduce the financial impact of the new Duilio and Italia-classes then under construction.
