= Italian ironclad Re di Portogallo =

Ironclad warship of the Italian Royal Navy

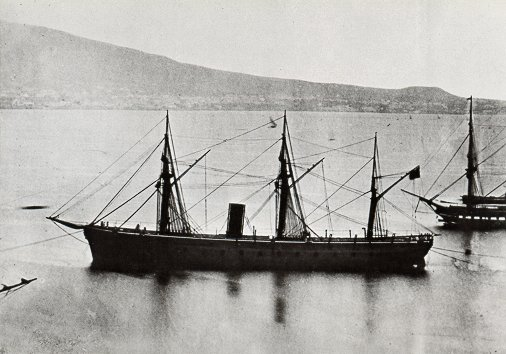
- Re di Portogallo or her sister Re d'Italia

History

Italy
- Name: Re di Portogallo
- Namesake: Luís I of Portugal
- Builder: William H. Webb, New York City
- Laid down: December 1861
- Launched: 29 August 1863
- Completed: 23 August 1864
- Stricken: 31 March 1875
- Fate: Broken up for scrap

General characteristics
- Class & type: Re d'Italia-class ironclad
- Displacement: Normal: 5,610 long tons (5,700 t); Full load: 6,082 long tons (6,180 t)
- Length: 99.61 m (326 ft 10 in)
- Beam: 16.76 m (55 ft)
- Draft: 7.18 m (23 ft 7 in)
- Installed power: 4 × fire-tube boilers; 1,812 to 1,845 ihp (1,351 to 1,376 kW)
- Propulsion: 1 × marine steam engine; 1 × screw propeller
- Sail plan: Barque-rigged
- Speed: 10.6 to 10.8 knots (19.6 to 20.0 km/h; 12.2 to 12.4 mph)
- Range: 1,800 nmi (3,300 km; 2,100 mi) at 10.5 knots (19.4 km/h; 12.1 mph)
- Complement: 552
- Armament: 6 × 203 mm (8 in) rifled muzzle-loaders; 32 × 164 mm (6.5 in) rifled muzzle-loaders
- Armor: Belt: 121 mm (4.75 in)

Re di Portogallo was an ironclad warship built for the Italian Regia Marina in the 1860s, the second and final member of the Re d'Italia class. She was laid down at the William H. Webb Shipyard in New York in December 1861, was launched in August 1863, and was completed a year later in August 1864; the two Re d'Italia-class ships were the only Italian ironclads built in the United States. The ships were broadside ironclads, armed with a battery of six 72-pounder guns and thirty-two 164 mm (6.5 in) guns.

Re di Portogallo saw action at the Battle of Lissa during the Third Italian War of Independence in 1866. She engaged several Austrian wooden vessels in the melee, including ship of the line Kaiser, which rammed Re di Portogallo but inflicted no significant damage. The ship's career after the war was very limited; in 1871, she was converted into a training ship. By 1875, her wooden hull was found to have deteriorated badly, and so she was broken up for scrap.

== Design ==
Following the creation of the Regia Marina (Royal Navy) in March 1861 as part of the unification of the Kingdom of Italy, the new navy embarked on a construction program to prepare for what it saw as an inevitable war with the Austrian Navy. As part of the program, the Italians ordered a pair of ironclads from the United States, since the shipbuilding firms in Italy could not support the number of ships needed. These two ships, which were based heavily on the French ironclad Gloire, were the largest ironclads in the Italian fleet for several years.

Re di Portogallo was 99.61 meters (326 ft 10 in) long overall; she had a beam of 16.76 m (55 ft) and an average draft of 7.18 m (23 ft 7 in). She displaced 5,610 long tons (5,700 t) normally and up to 6,082 long tons (6,180 t) at full load. Her hull was built from unseasoned green wood. Because her hull was of wooden construction, it could not be divided into watertight compartments. She had a crew of 552.

The ship's propulsion system consisted of one single-expansion marine steam engine that drove a single screw propeller. Steam was supplied by four coal-fired, rectangular fire-tube boilers, which were vented through a single funnel located amidships. Her engine produced a top speed of 10.6 to 10.8 knots (19.6 to 20.0 km/h; 12.2 to 12.4 mph) from 1,812 to 1,845 indicated horsepower (1,351 to 1,376 kW). She could steam for about 1,800 nautical miles (3,300 km; 2,100 mi) at a speed of 10.5 knots (19.4 km/h; 12.1 mph). For long-distance travel, Re di Portogallo was fitted with three masts and was barque-rigged.

Re di Portogallo was a broadside ironclad, and she was armed with a main battery of six 72-pounder 203 mm (8 in) guns and thirty-two 164 mm (6.5 in) rifled muzzle-loading guns. The ship was equipped with a spur-shaped ram at the bow. The ship's hull was sheathed with wrought iron armor that was 121 mm (4.75 in) thick. Her rudder and propellers, however, were not protected by her armor.

== Service history ==
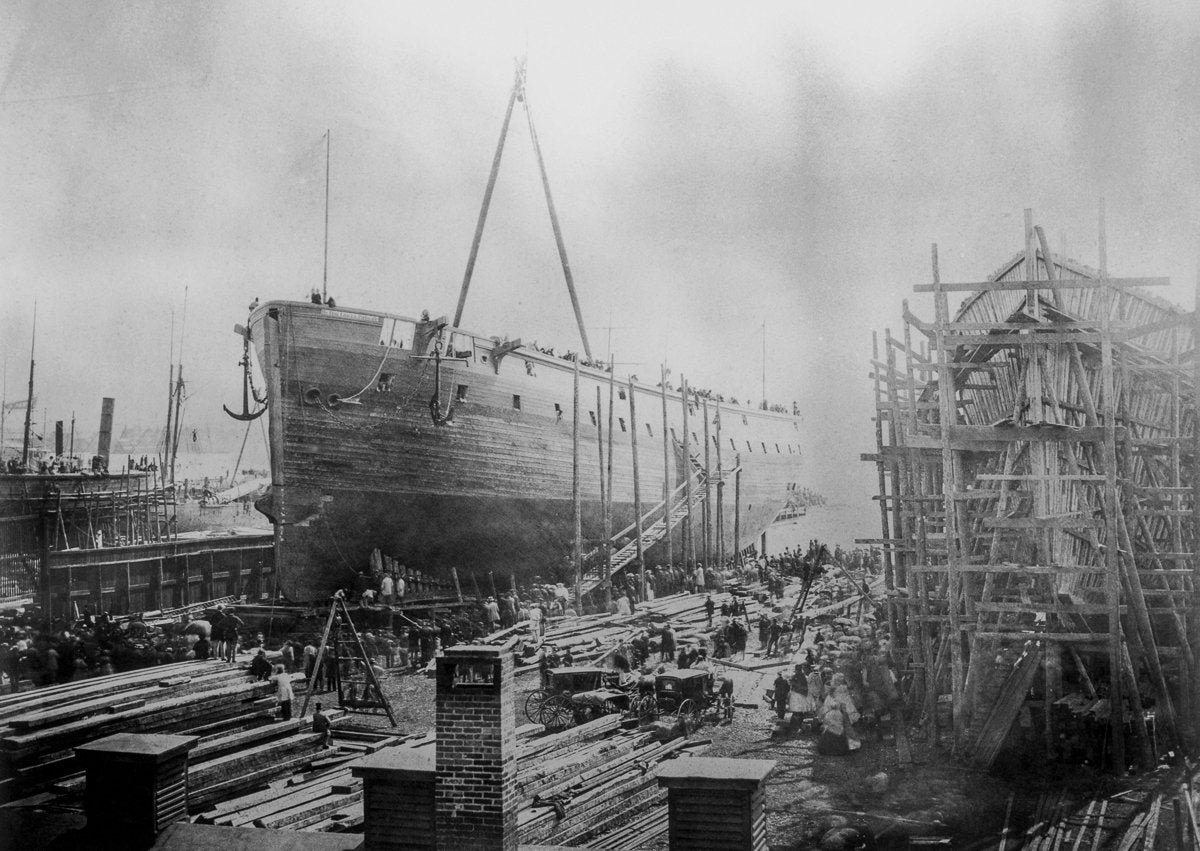
Re di Portogallo on the day of launching 29 August 1863

The keel for Re di Portogallo was laid down at the William H. Webb Shipyard in New York City in December 1861; she and her sister were the only Italian ironclads to be built in the United States. She was launched on 29 August 1863 and completed just under a year later, on 23 August 1864. Re di Portogallo then crossed the Atlantic and joined the Italian fleet. In June 1866, Italy declared war on Austria, as part of the Third Italian War of Independence, which was fought concurrently with the Austro-Prussian War. The Italian fleet commander, Admiral Carlo Pellion di Persano, initially adopted a cautious course of action; he was unwilling to risk battle with the Austrian Navy, despite the fact that the Austrian fleet was much weaker than his own. Persano claimed he was simply waiting on the ironclad ram Affondatore, en route from Britain, but his inaction weakened morale in the fleet, with many of his subordinates openly accusing him of cowardice.

Rear Admiral Wilhelm von Tegetthoff brought the Austrian fleet to Ancona on June 27, in attempt to draw out the Italians. At the time, many of the Italian ships were in disarray; several ships did not have their entire armament, and several others had problems with their engines, including Re di Portogallo, which could not get underway. Persano held a council of war aboard the ironclad Principe di Carignano to determine whether he should sortie to engage Tegetthoff, but by that time, the Austrians had withdrawn, making the decision moot. The Minister of the Navy, Agostino Depretis, urged Persano to act and suggested the island of Lissa, to restore Italian confidence after their defeat at the Battle of Custoza the previous month. On 7 July, Persano left Ancona and conducted a sweep into the Adriatic, but encountered no Austrian ships and returned on the 13th.

=== Battle of Lissa ===
On 16 July, Persano took the Italian fleet out of Ancona, bound for Lissa, where they arrived on the 18th. With them, they brought troop transports carrying 3,000 soldiers; the Italian warships began bombarding the Austrian forts on the island, with the intention of landing the soldiers once the fortresses had been silenced. In response, the Austrian Navy sent the fleet under Tegetthoff to attack the Italian ships. Re di Portogallo was at that time in the 3rd Division, along with the ironclads Terribile, Formidabile, and Regina Maria Pia, and the coastal defense ship Varese. The Italian 2nd and 3rd Divisions were sent to attack the coastal batteries protecting the town of Vis; Re di Portogallo, Terribile, Regina Maria Pia, and Varese were assigned the eastern defenses, while four other ironclads were tasked with suppressing the batteries on the western side. One shell from Regina Maria Pia detonated the powder magazine of Fort San Giorgio, which neutralized the defenses there. The success prompted Persano to order two other ironclads to attempt to force an entrance into the harbor, but heavy Austrian artillery fire forced him to break off the attempt. After the attack failed, the Italians withdrew late in the day, preparing to launch another attack the following morning. Persano ordered Formidabile to enter the harbor at Vis and attack the Madonna battery, supported by the ironclads Castelfidardo, Ancona, and Principe di Carignano.

The next morning, Persano ordered another attack; four ironclads would force the harbor defenses at Vis while Re di Portogallo and the rest of the fleet would attempt to suppress the outer fortifications. This assault also failed to neutralize the Austrian coastal fortifications, and two ships were damaged in the fighting. With the day's attacks again having yielded no results, Persano met with his senior officers to discuss options. His chief of staff, d'Amico, and Vacca both suggested a withdrawal owing to the shortage of coal, but Persano ruled that out. He ultimately decided to make another attempt on the 20th. Vacca would take his three ships to patrol to the north-east of the island while the rest of the fleet would again try to land the soldiers.

Before the Italians could begin the attack, but after the fleet had begun to disperse for the landing operation, the dispatch boat Esploratore arrived, bringing news of Tegetthoff's approach. Persano's fleet was in disarray; the three ships of Admiral Giovanni Vacca's 1st Division were three miles to the northeast from Persano's main force, and three other ironclads were further away to the west. Persano immediately ordered his ships to form up with Vacca's, first in line abreast formation, and then in line ahead formation. Re di Portogallo initially had trouble getting her engines running, but after repairs were quickly made, she joined the rest of the fleet. She was one of the last ships in the line.

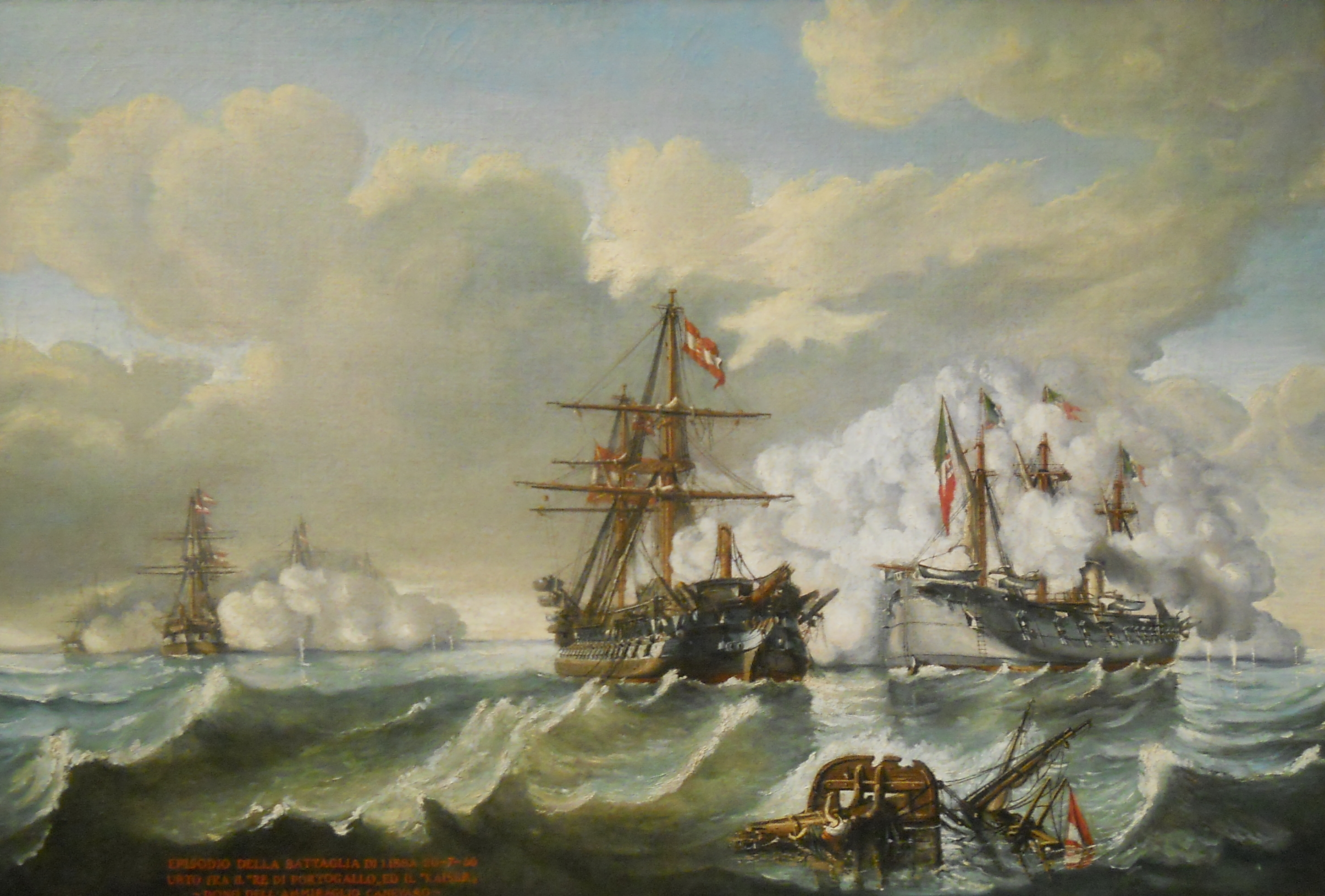
SMS Kaiser (center) disengaging from Re di Portogallo (right) after ramming her

Shortly before the action began, Persano decided to leave his flagship and transfer to Affondatore, though none of his subordinates on the other ships were aware of the change. They were thus left to fight as individuals without direction. More dangerously, by stopping Re d'Italia, he allowed a significant gap to open up between Vacca's three ships and the rest of the fleet. Tegetthoff took his fleet through the gap between Vacca's and Persano's ships, in an attempt to split the Italian line and initiate a melee. He failed to ram any Italian vessels on the first pass, so he turned back toward Persano's ships, and took Re d'Italia, San Martino, and Palestro under heavy fire. The Austrians quickly inflicted serious damage on Re d'Italia and Palestro, eventually sinking both ships. After Palestro withdrew, the Austrian ironclads turned their attention to the 3rd Division, including Re di Portogallo.

Re di Portogallo initially attacked the unarmored ships Erzherzog Friedrich and Kaiserin Elizabeth before the ship of the line Kaiser rammed Re di Portogallo in an attempt to save them. Kaiser struck only a glancing blow, however, and inflicted little damage. Re di Portogallo fired her light guns into the ship in response, starting a fire, and killing or wounding a number of Austrian gunners before Kaiser could break free. By this time, Re d'Italia had been rammed and sunk, and Palestro had been set on fire, soon to be destroyed by a magazine explosion. Persano broke off the engagement, and though his ships still outnumbered the Austrians, Persano refused to counter-attack with his badly demoralized forces. In addition, the fleet was low on coal and ammunition. The Italian fleet began to withdraw, followed by the Austrians; as night began to fall, the opposing fleets disengaged completely, heading for Ancona and Pola, respectively. Re di Portogallo emerged from the battle relatively unscathed, though many of her iron plates had been loosened in the collision with Kaiser.

=== Later career ===
After the battle, Vacca replaced Persano; he was ordered to attack the main Austrian naval base at Pola, but the war ended before the operation could be carried out. The damage to Re di Portogallo was repaired after the battle, but the ship was rapidly made obsolete by the development of casemate ships and shortly thereafter turret ships. As a result, her postwar career was very limited. In 1870, Re di Portogallo was reduced to harbor duties owing to poor condition. The same year, the ship's armament was modified; twenty of her 164 mm guns were removed and two 10 in (254 mm) guns were added. The following year, she was converted into a gunnery training ship, and was again re-equipped, now with twenty 8 in guns, two 4.7 in (120 mm) guns, and eight 80 mm (3.1 in) guns.

By October 1871, Re di Portogallo had been stationed in La Spezia, along with Regina Maria Pia, San Martino, Castelfidardo, Affondatore, and the new ironclad Roma. In 1873, she was stationed in La Spezia for gunnery training. The ship did not serve long in this capacity; the ageing of the unseasoned wood used to build the ship, coupled with several flaws in the ship's construction cut her career short. She was stricken from the naval register on 31 March 1875 and subsequently broken up for scrap. The Navy discarded Re di Portogallo and the three Principe di Carignano-class ironclads between 1875 and 1880 to remove the cost of maintaining them from the naval budget, as part of an effort to reduce the financial impact of the new Duilio and Italia-classes then under construction.
