= Principe di Carignano-class ironclad =

Ironclad warship class of the Italian Royal Navy

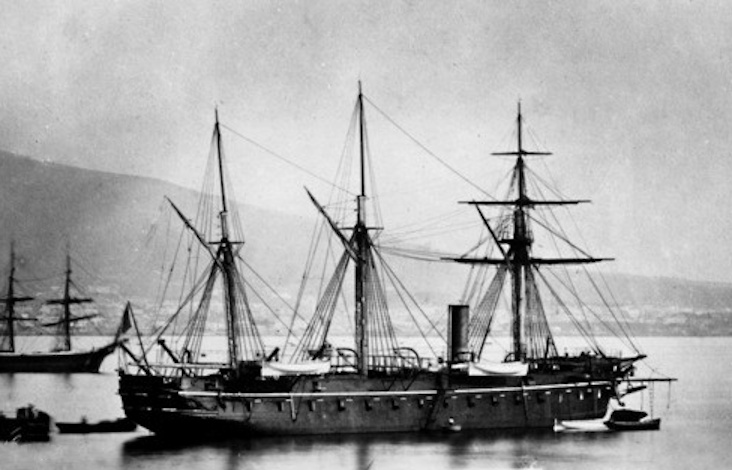
- Principe di Carignano in Naples in 1867

Class overview
- Name: Principe di Carignano class
- Builders: Cantiere della Foce; Regio Cantiere di Castellammare di Stabia; San Rocco
- Operators: Regia Marina
- Preceded by: Formidabile class
- Succeeded by: Re d'Italia class
- Built: 1861–1871
- In commission: 1865–1880
- Completed: 3
- Retired: 3

General characteristics (Note: Figures are for Principe di Carignano)
- Type: Ironclad warship
- Displacement: Normal: 3,446 long tons (3,501 t); Full load: 3,912 long tons (3,975 t)
- Length: 72.89 m (239 ft 2 in)
- Beam: 15.10 m (49 ft 6 in)
- Draft: 7.18 m (23 ft 7 in)
- Installed power: 6 × fire-tube boilers; 1,968 ihp (1,468 kW)
- Propulsion: 1 × marine steam engine; 1 × screw propeller
- Speed: 10.4 knots (19.3 km/h; 12.0 mph)
- Range: 1,200 nmi (2,200 km) at 10 kn (19 km/h; 12 mph)
- Complement: 572
- Armament: 10 × 203 mm (8 in) guns; 12 × 164 mm (6 in) guns
- Armor: Belt armor: 121 mm (4.75 in)

The Principe di Carignano class was a group of three ironclad warships built for the Italian Regia Marina (Royal Navy) in the 1860s. The class comprised the ships Principe di Carignano, Messina, and Conte Verde. Originally ordered as wooden frigates, they were the first ironclads to be built in Italy, but the inexperience of the Italian shipyards and the redesign process produced lengthy construction times, such that only the lead ship was completed in time to see action during the Third Italian War of Independence in 1866. The first two ships were protected by a complete belt of wrought iron plating that was 121 mm (4.75 in) thick, while Conte Verde only received a partial iron belt.

Principe di Carignano took part in the Battle of Lissa on 20 July 1866, where she led the Italian line of battle, but was not heavily engaged. Rendered obsolescent by the advent of central battery and turret ships in the 1870s, the three Principe di Carignano-class ships did not have particularly long or active service lives. In an effort to reduce the maintenance budget to offset the cost of newer ships under construction, Principe di Carignano was stricken from the naval register in 1875; Messina and Conte Verde followed in 1880, the latter just nine years after completion.

== Design ==
The first two vessels of the Principe di Carignano class were initially ordered as steam frigates by the Regia Marina Sarda (Royal Sardinian Navy) shortly before the unification of Italy. While they were on the stocks, the Regia Marina (Royal Navy) of the newly-formed Kingdom of Italy decided to convert the ships into ironclads. A third ship, Principe Umberto, was too far advanced in her construction to allow for conversion, and so she was completed as a wooden vessel. These ships had been designed by Inps. Eng. Felice Mattei. A fourth ship, Conte Verde, was built to a modified design created by Inps. Eng. Giuseppe De Luca. These ships came as part of a major naval expansion program that was designed to prepare a fleet of ironclads capable of defeating the Austrian Navy, which resulted in the Austro-Italian ironclad arms race. Italy considered the Austrian Empire to be its main rival, since it controlled predominantly Italian areas, including Venice, that the newly unified kingdom sought to incorporate into the country.

=== General characteristics and machinery ===
The ships of the Principe di Carignano class varied slightly in their dimensions. Principe de Carignano was 72.98 meters (239 ft 5 in) long between perpendiculars, with a beam of 15.1 m (49 ft 6 in) and an average draft of 7.18 m (23 ft 7 in). She displaced 3,446 long tons (3,501 t) normally and up to 3,912 long tons (3,975 t) at full load. The second ship, Messina, was 72.8 m (238 ft 10 in) between perpendiculars; she had a beam of 15.1 m (49 ft 6 in) and an average draft of 7.27 m (23 ft 10 in). At normal loading, she displaced 3,868 long tons (3,930 t), and she reached 4,245 long tons (4,313 t) with a full load. Conte Verde was 73.7 m (241 ft 10 in) long between perpendiculars and her beam was 15.3 m (50 ft 2 in). She had a draft of 6.5 m (21 ft 4 in), and displaced 3,514 long tons (3,570 t) normally and up to 3,866 long tons (3,928 t) at full load. The ships had a crew of 572.

Their propulsion system consisted of one single-expansion marine steam engine that drove a single screw propeller, with steam supplied by six coal-fired, cylindrical fire-tube boilers. The boilers were trunked into a single funnel. Their engines produced a top speed of 10.2 to 11.4 knots (18.9 to 21.1 km/h; 11.7 to 13.1 mph), with Conte Verde being the fastest member of the class, from 1,968 indicated horsepower (1,468 kW). They could steam for about 1,200 nautical miles (2,200 km; 1,400 mi) at a speed of 10 knots (19 km/h; 12 mph). To supplement her steam engine, the ship was barquentine-rigged with three masts.

=== Armament and armor ===
The Principe di Carignano-class ships were broadside ironclads; the lead ship was armed with a main battery of ten 72-pounder 203 mm (8 in) guns and twelve 164 mm (6.5 in) rifled muzzle-loading guns Messina and Conte Verde instead carried four 8 in guns and eighteen 164 mm guns. The ships were equipped with a spur-shaped ram at the bow. In 1870, the ships' armament was revised; Principe di Carignano retained four of her 8 in guns, with the other four being replaced by 164 mm guns. Messina lost ten of her 164 mm guns and gained a pair of 254 mm (10 in) guns, while Conte Verde was reequipped with six 10 in guns and one 8 in gun.

The above-water portions of the first two ships' hulls were sheathed with wrought iron armor that was 121 mm (4.75 in) thick. Unlike her two sisters, Conte Verde did not have complete iron armor on her sides. She instead had wrought iron armor that covered only parts of her bow and stern instead of the full armored belt fitted to her sisters. The rest of the ship received traditional timber armor.

== Ships ==
Construction data
Name	Builder	Laid down	Launched	Completed
Principe di Carignano	Cantiere della Foce	January 1861	15 September 1863	11 June 1865
Messina	Regio Cantiere di Castellammare di Stabia	28 September 1861	20 December 1864	February 1867
Conte Verde	San Rocco	2 March 1863	29 July 1867	December 1871

== Service history ==
Though the Principe di Carignanos were the second class of Italian ironclads, the foreign shipyards that built the subsequent Re d'Italia and Regina Maria Pia classes completed almost all of those vessels before the first member of the Principe di Carignano class entered service. Principe di Carignano was the only member of the class to enter service in time to take part in the Third Italian War of Independence against the Austrian Empire. The war broke out in June 1866, as Italy, which had allied with Prussia, sought to take advantage of the Austro-Prussian War to seize Austrian-controlled Venice. After initially remaining in port, the Italian fleet under Admiral Carlo Pellion di Persano launched an attack on the island of Lissa in mid-July; the Austrian fleet under Rear Admiral Wilhelm von Tegetthoff sortied to mount a counterattack, which resulted in the Battle of Lissa on 20 July. Principe di Carignano, the lead ship in the line of battle, was not heavily engaged, as Tegetthoff had attacked the Italian fleet at its center. Principe di Carignano tried to attack the wooden vessels of the Austrian fleet without success before Persano broke off the action; the Italian fleet had become disorganized and two ships, Re d'Italia and Palestro had been sunk.

The three ships, which rapidly became obsolescent due to the development of central battery ironclads and later turret ships, saw very limited service in the 1870s. Principe di Carignano and Messina were modernized with new guns in 1870. Neither ship played a role in the attack on Civitavecchia that year—the last stage of the Italian wars of unification that resulted in the seizure of Rome—owing to the very poor state of the Regia Marina in the aftermath of Lissa. In 1875, Principe di Carignano was sold for scrap to reduce the maintenance budget in an attempt to offset part of the cost of the new Duilio and Italia-class ironclads then under construction; Messina and Conte Verde followed in 1880, though the latter remained laid up until she too went to the breakers' yard in 1898.
