= Giovanni Vacca (naval officer) =

Giovanni Vacca (12 March 1810 – 2 July 1879) was an admiral of the Sicilian Navy and later of the Italian Regia Marina in the 19th century.

Vacca was born in Naples on 12 March 1810. In 1860, after the Expedition of the Thousand, he joined the Regia Marina as a Captain. Promoted to Rear-Admiral, he later commanded a small squadron of active ships. In 1866 for the Third Italian War of Independence Vacca was appointed commander of a squadron under Admiral Carlo Pellion di Persano; in this capacity, he participated in the Battle of Lissa. His conduct during the unsuccessful battle (together with that of fellow squadron commander Vice Admiral Albini), while largely escaping censure at the time (as blame was attached only on Persano, who was processed and cashiered in disgrace), has been much criticised by historians.

He died in Naples on 2 July 1879.
