= SMS Kaiser (1858) =

Warship of the Austro-Hungarian Navy

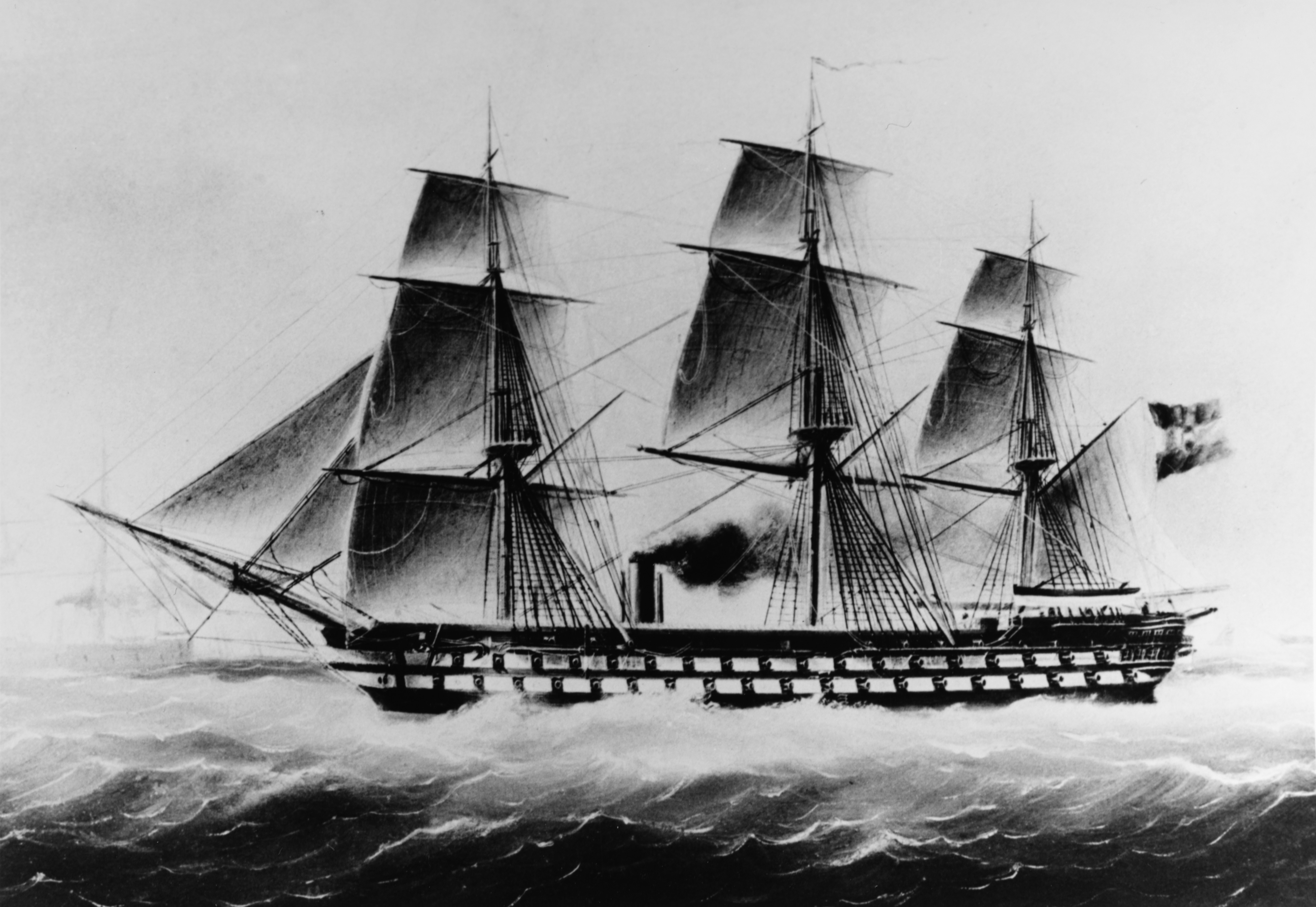
- SMS Kaiser in her original configuration

History

Austro-Hungarian Empire
- Name: SMS Kaiser
- Namesake: Kaiser
- Builder: Pola Navy Yard
- Laid down: 25 March 1855
- Launched: 4 October 1858
- Commissioned: 1859
- Renamed: Bellona, 1902
- Fate: Unknown after 1918

General characteristics (as built)
- Type: Ship of the line
- Displacement: 5,194 long tons (5,277 t)
- Length: 74.02 m (242 ft 10 in)
- Beam: 16.21 m (53 ft 2 in)
- Installed power: 6 × boilers; 800 nominal horsepower
- Propulsion: 1 × marine steam engine; 1 × screw propeller
- Complement: 900
- Armament: 16 × 60-pounder guns; 74 × 30-pounder guns; 2 × 24-pounder guns

Class overview
- Name: (as ironclad)
- Preceded by: Erzherzog Albrecht
- Succeeded by: Kaiser Max class

General characteristics (1873)
- Type: Casemate ship
- Displacement: 5,720 long tons (5,810 t)
- Length: 78 m (255 ft)
- Beam: 699 in (58 ft 3 in)
- Draft: 290 in (24 ft 2 in)
- Installed power: 2,786 ihp (2,078 kW)
- Speed: 11.55 knots (21.39 km/h; 13.29 mph)
- Range: 1,519 nautical miles (2,813 km; 1,748 mi) at 10 knots (19 km/h; 12 mph)
- Complement: 471
- Armament: 10 × 9 in (229 mm) guns; 6 × 8-pounder guns
- Armor: Belt: 152 mm (6 in); Casemate: 127 mm (5 in)

SMS Kaiser was a 92-gun wooden ship of the line of the Austrian Navy, the last vessel of the type, and the only screw-driven example, to be built by the Austrians. She was built by the naval shipyard in Pola; she was laid down in March 1855, was launched in October 1858, and was completed the following year. The ship took part in the Second Schleswig War of 1864, but saw no action during her deployment to the North Sea. Kaiser did see action during the Seven Weeks' War two years later, during which she took part in the Battle of Lissa as the flagship of Anton von Petz, commander of the Austrian 2nd Division. Kaiser engaged several Italian ironclads simultaneously, rammed one—Re di Portogallo—and damaged another—Affondatore—with gunfire. In doing so, she became the only wooden ship of the line to engage an ironclad warship in battle.

In 1869, the Austro-Hungarians decided to rebuild Kaiser into an ironclad casemate ship; the work lasted until 1873, and was delayed significantly by budget shortfalls, which slowed the acquisition of armor plate from British firms. By this time, however, casemate ships were being superseded by turret ships, and as a result, Kaiser spent the years 1875–1902 in reserve. She was nevertheless modernized periodically throughout the 1870s and 1880s in attempts to improve her performance. In 1901–1902, she was renamed Bellona and had her armament and engines removed so she could be used as a barracks ship in Pola, a role she filled through World War I. Italy seized the ship as a war prize after the end of the conflict, but her ultimate fate is unknown.

== Design ==
Kaiser in drydock

Starting in the early 1850s, the Austrian Empire, faced with a strengthening Kingdom of Sardinia—which unified most of the Italian peninsula in a decade—began to modernize its navy with new steam-driven warships. Archduke Ferdinand Maximilian oversaw the program, which began with the screw frigate Radetzky laid down in Britain in 1852. Two years later, Ferdinand decided a steam ship of the line should be built next; he originally intended the new ship would be built as a copy of the British 91-gun ship of the line HMS Agamemnon, the plans for which the Royal Navy provided to Austria in exchange for the country remaining neutral during the Crimean War of 1853–1856. The excellent performance of the French ship Algésiras during the war prompted the Austrians to modify the Agamemnon design to incorporate features of the French vessel, including a greater size and more powerful machinery. A second vessel of a slightly larger design, to have been named Österreich and armed with 101 guns, was cancelled in 1859 before she was laid down.

Kaiser was designed by Swedish naval engineer Axel Ljungstedt, who was active in Austria between 1850 and 1856. Figures for the ship's original characteristics are unclear. According to the contemporary historian Wilhelm von Rüstow, Kaiser was 74 meters (242 ft) long, with a displacement of 5,337 long tons (5,423 t). But the modern naval historian Andrew Lambert states her length was 74.02 metres (242 ft 10 in) on 5,194 long tons (5,277 t). He also provides a beam of 16.21 metres (53 ft 2 in).

The ship was powered by a two-cylinder horizontal steam engine, which drove a single screw propeller that was 5.75 m (18.9 ft) in diameter. Steam was provided by six coal-fired boilers with twenty-six fireboxes. The engine, which was manufactured by Maudslay, Sons and Field, was rated at 800 nominal horsepower. A three-masted ship rig supplemented the steam engine.

Her crew numbered some 900 officers and men, which included a contingent of naval infantry. She was armed with a battery of ninety-two guns, consisting of sixteen 60-pounder guns, seventy-four 30-pounder smoothbores, and two 24-pounder breech loaders.

== Service history ==
The keel of Kaiser was laid down on 25 March 1855 at the naval shipyard in Pola; the ship was launched on 4 October 1858, and commissioned into the Austrian Navy in 1859. She began sea trials on 6 December that year, with the first trip under her own power taking place from Muggia to Pola. In February 1864, the Austrian Empire joined Prussia in the Second Schleswig War against Denmark. Kaiser was sent with the new armored frigate Don Juan d'Austria and two smaller vessels under Vice Admiral Bernhard von Wüllerstorf-Urbair to reinforce a smaller force consisting of the screw frigates Schwarzenberg and Radetzky under then-Captain Wilhelm von Tegetthoff. After the two groups combined in Den Helder, the Netherlands, they proceeded to Cuxhaven on 27 June, arriving three days later. The now outnumbered Danish fleet remained in port for the rest of the war and did not seek battle with the Austro-Prussian squadron. Instead, the Austrian and Prussian naval forces supported operations to capture the islands off the western Danish coast. During the campaign, Kaiser was commanded by Friedrich von Pöck.

=== Battle of Lissa ===
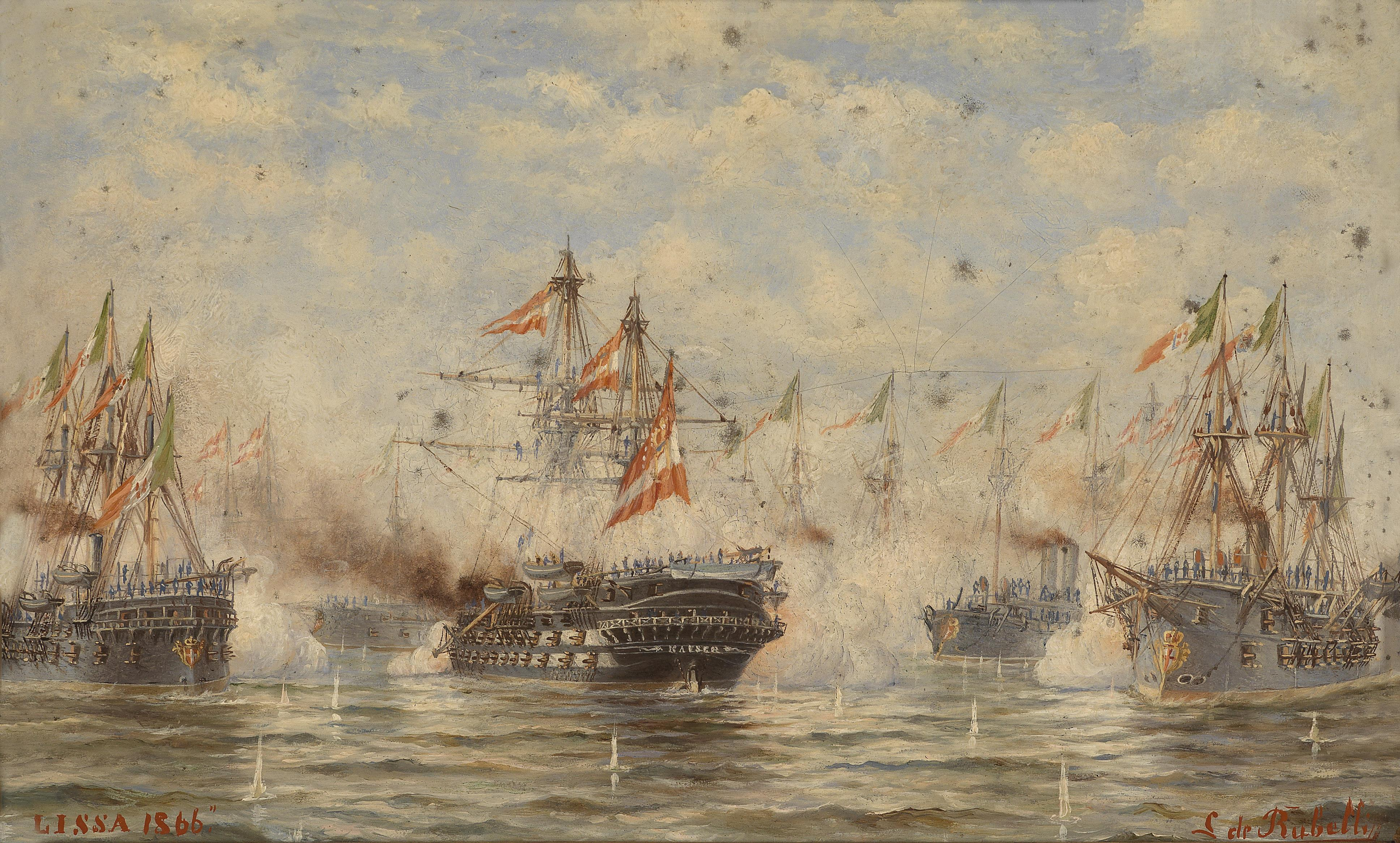
Kaiser surrounded by Italian ironclads at Lissa

In June 1866, Italy declared war on Austria, as part of the Third Italian War of Independence, which was fought concurrently with the Austro-Prussian War. Tegetthoff, by now promoted to rear admiral and given command of the entire fleet, brought the Austrian fleet to Ancona on 27 June, in an attempt to draw out the Italians, but the Italian commander, Admiral Carlo Pellion di Persano, refused to engage Tegetthoff. At the time, Kaiser served as the flagship of the 2nd Division of the Austrian fleet, under the command of Anton Petz. On 16 July, Persano took the Italian fleet, with twelve ironclads, out of Ancona, bound for the island of Lissa, where they arrived on the 18th. With them, they brought troop transports carrying 3,000 soldiers. Persano then spent the next two days bombarding the Austrian defenses of the island and unsuccessfully attempting to force a landing. Tegetthoff received a series of telegrams between 17 and 19 July notifying him of the Italian attack, which he initially believed to be a feint to draw the Austrian fleet away from its main bases at Pola and Venice. By the morning of the 19th, however, he was convinced that Lissa was in fact the Italian objective, and so he requested permission to attack.

As Tegetthoff's fleet arrived off Lissa on the morning of 20 July, Persano's fleet was arrayed for another landing attempt. The latter's ships were divided into three groups, with only the first two able to concentrate in time to meet the Austrians. Tegetthoff had arranged his ironclad ships into a wedge-shaped formation, with the wooden warships of the 2nd and 3rd Divisions following behind in the same formation. Kaiser led the 2nd Division at the center of the line. While he was forming up his ships, Persano transferred from his flagship, Re d'Italia, to the turret ship Affondatore. This created a gap in the Italian line, and Tegetthoff seized the opportunity to divide the Italian fleet and create a melee. He made a pass through the gap, but failed to ram any of the Italian ships, forcing him to turn around and make another attempt. In the meantime, Petz took Kaiser and his division further south, hoping to attack the Italian wooden ships that had not joined the action. Instead, the rear of the Italian ironclad line turned to block Petz from Tegetthoff and attacked Kaiser. Petz in turn reoriented his division to attack the Italian ironclads, leading the charge with Kaiser.

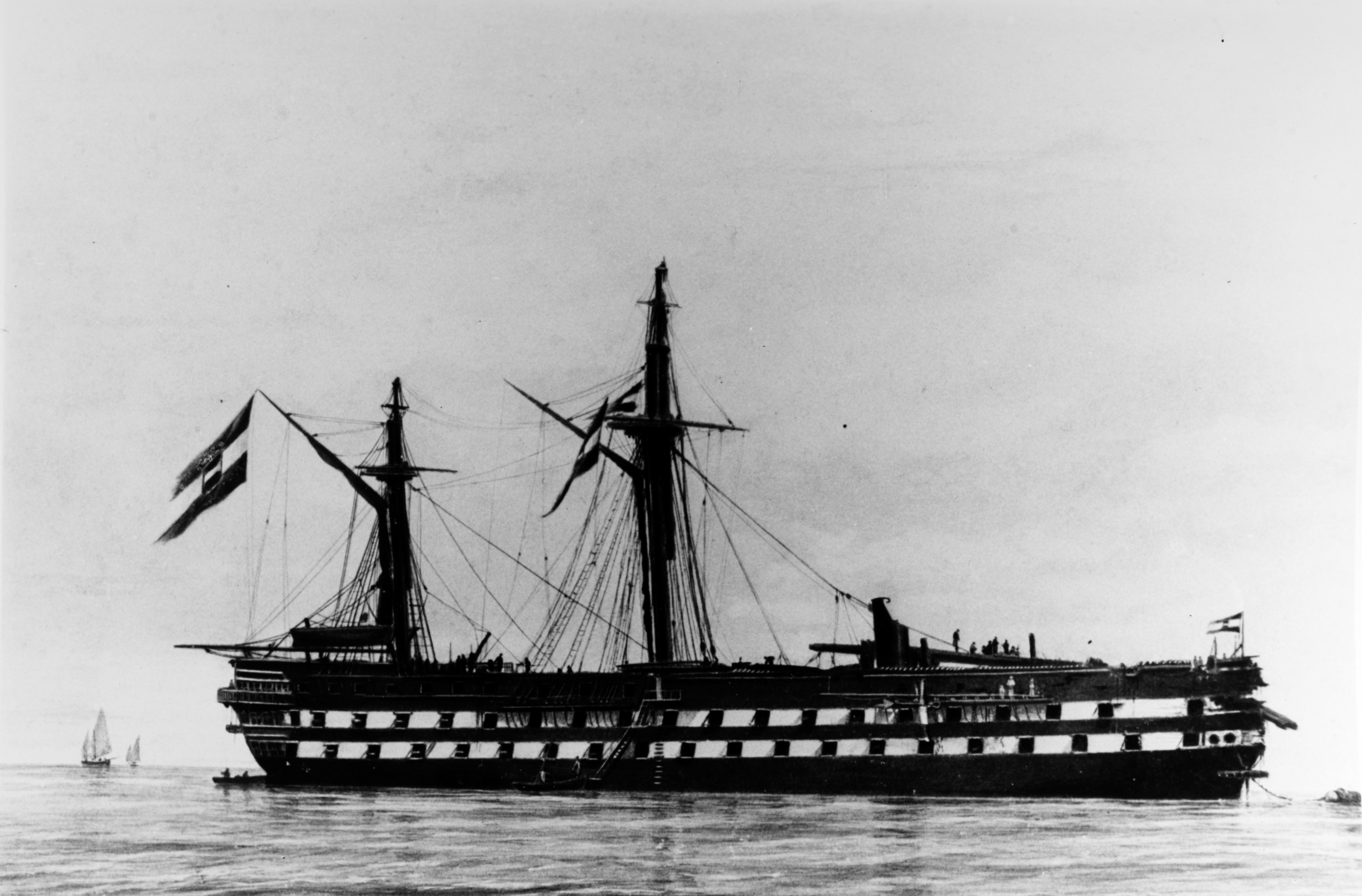
Kaiser after the battle, partially dismasted

The ironclads Castelfidardo, Varese, and Principe di Carignano circled around Kaiser, trading broadsides with her. In the ensuing melee, the Austrian and Italian vessels repeatedly attempted to ram each other. Persano arrived in Affondatore and unsuccessfully tried to ram Kaiser, but missed and struck only a glancing blow. Shortly thereafter, Kaiser rammed the ironclad Re di Portogallo in an attempt to protect the Austrian unarmored ships Erzherzog Friedrich and Kaiserin Elizabeth. Kaiser also struck a glancing blow, however, and inflicted little damage. Re di Portogallo fired her light guns into the ship in response, starting a fire, and killing or wounding a number of Austrian gunners before Kaiser could break free. Affondatore then made a second, unsuccessful attempt to ram Kaiser. Though she missed with her ram, Affondatore did score a hit with one of her guns, badly damaging Kaiser, killing or wounding twenty of her crew. In return, Kaiser's gunners fired their guns into Affondatore's deck, badly holing it and starting a fire, while riflemen in her fighting tops shot at Italian sailors. In addition, a shot from Kaiser struck one of Affondatore's turrets, jamming it for the remainder of the battle. Kaiser had lost her foremast and funnel in the collision with Re di Portogallo, and Petz ordered his damaged ship to put into port at Lissa.

By this time, the Austrian ironclads disengaged from the melee to protect their wooden ships; Re d'Italia had been rammed and sunk and the coastal defense ship Palestro was burning badly, soon to be destroyed by a magazine explosion. Persano made an attempt to follow them with Affondatore, but he broke off the attempt when only one of his other ironclads followed him. His crews were badly demoralized by the loss of Re d'Italia and Palestro, and his ships were low on ammunition and coal. The Italian fleet began to withdraw, followed by the Austrians; as night began to fall, the opposing fleets disengaged completely, heading for Ancona and Pola, respectively. In the course of the battle, Kaiser's crew had suffered twenty-four killed and thirty-seven wounded. Kaiser was and is the only ship of the line to have engaged ironclad warships in battle.

=== Conversion and later career ===
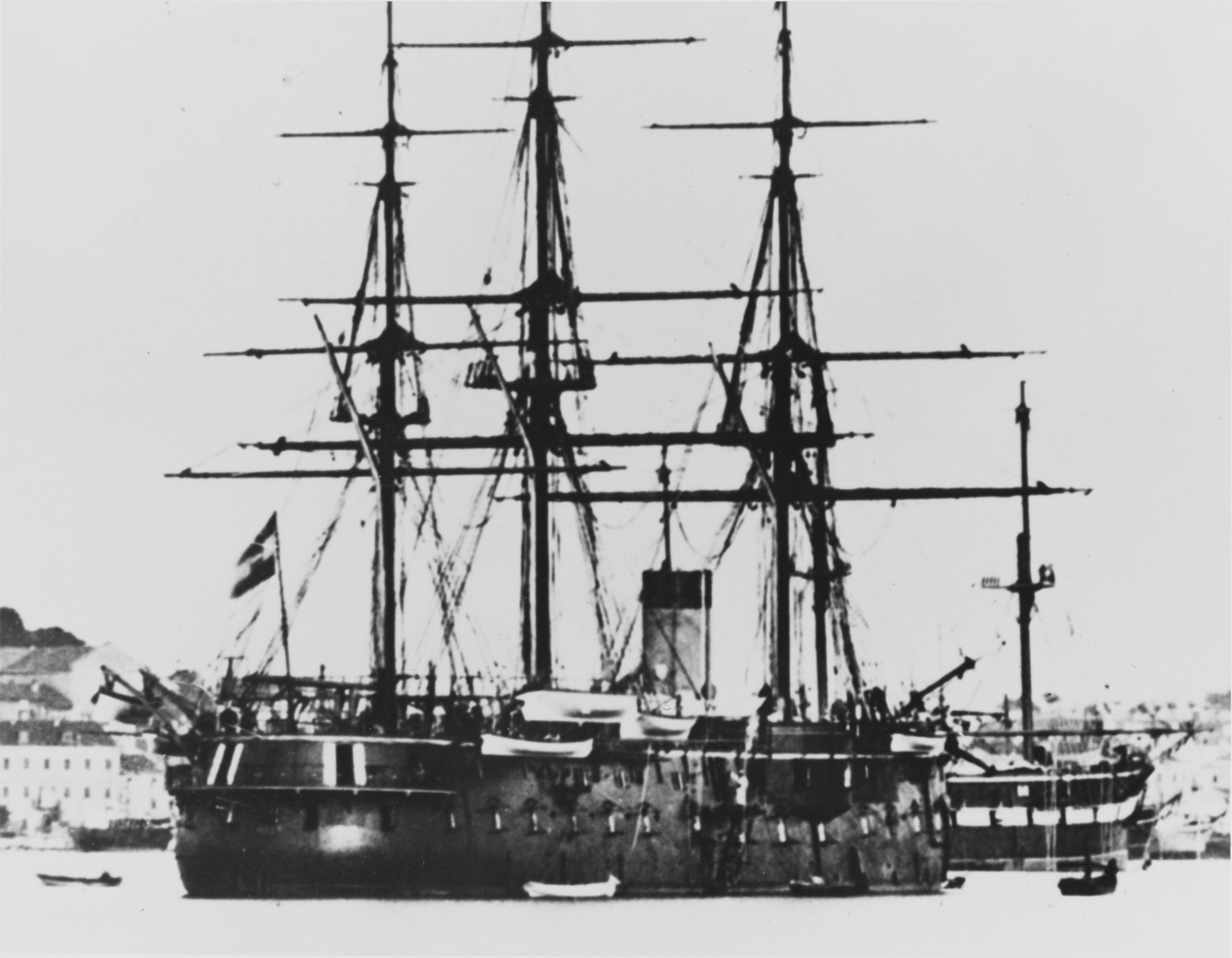
Kaiser after her reconstruction into a casemate ship

After returning to Pola, Tegetthoff kept his fleet in the northern Adriatic, where it patrolled against a possible Italian attack. The Italian ships never came, and on 12 August, the two countries signed the Armistice of Cormons; this ended the fighting and led to the Treaty of Vienna. Though Austria had defeated Italy at Lissa and on land at the Battle of Custoza, the Austrian army was decisively defeated by Prussia at the Battle of Königgrätz. As a result, Austria, which became Austria-Hungary in the Ausgleich of 1867, was forced to cede the city of Venice to Italy. In the immediate aftermath of the war, the bulk of the Austrian fleet was decommissioned and disarmed.

Chronic budgetary problems confronted the navy of the new Austro-Hungarian Empire; Tegetthoff had great difficulty securing funding for new ships to modernize the fleet. In 1868, he attempted to start a new building program, but the government refused to budget for new warships. Parliament did include funds to modernize Kaiser, however. On 2 February 1869, Kaiser was taken into drydock and her hull was examined. Found to be in good condition, the ship was rebuilt into an ironclad casemate ship. Old wood planking below the waterline was replaced, but the hull was completely rebuilt with iron above the waterline. Her bow was replaced with a more pronounced ram and she received a new stern as well. This increased her length to 77.75 m (255.1 ft) at the waterline and increased her beam to 17.76 m (58.3 ft). Her draft remained similar, at 7.37 m (24.2 ft), though her displacement increased to 5,720 long tons (5,810 t). Superheaters were added to her original boilers to provide more power, and her engines were rated to produce a speed of 13 knots (24 km/h; 15 mph) from 3,130 ihp (2,330 kW), though in service she was only capable of reaching 11.55 knots (21.39 km/h; 13.29 mph) from 2,786 ihp (2,078 kW). At a cruising speed of 10 knots (19 km/h; 12 mph), she could steam for 1,519 nautical miles (2,813 km; 1,748 mi).

The ship was rearmed with a battery of ten 9 in (230 mm) 23-pounder muzzle-loading guns manufactured by Armstrong in a central, two-story casemate. These were supported by a secondary battery of six 8-pounder Rifled Muzzle Loaders. An armored belt was installed on the waterline; in the central citadel that protected the machinery spaces, the belt was 152 mm (6 in) thick. On either end of the ship, the belt was reduced to 102 mm (4 in). Iron plating 127 mm (5 in) thick protected the casemate. Kaiser was re-launched in 1871, but further budgetary problems, particularly payments for the armor plate and iron fittings that were purchased from Britain, delayed completion of the conversion. Work was finally completed in December 1873. She began sea trials on 21 December. By this time, the ship had become obsolescent; the same year, Italy laid down the two Duilio-class ironclads, very powerful turret ships twice the size of Kaiser and that carried 450 mm (17.7 in) guns.

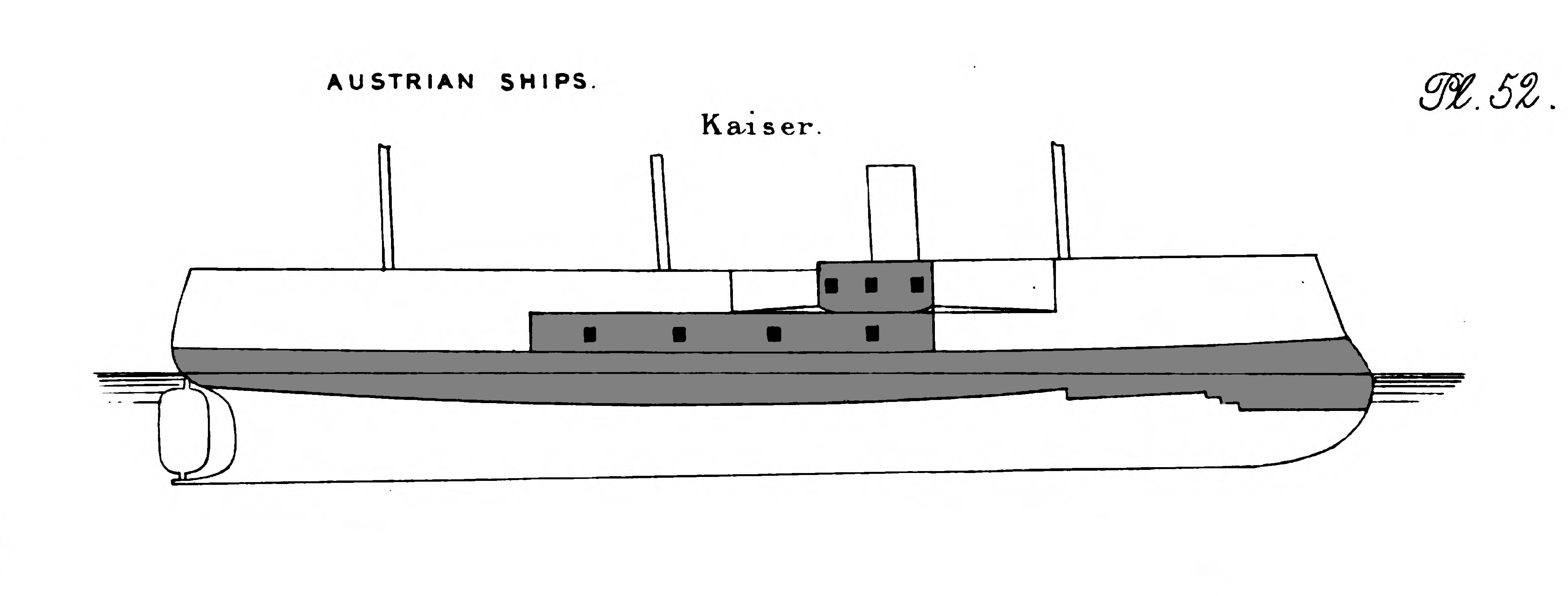
Line drawing of Kaiser after her reconstruction

On 11 February 1874, Kaiser joined the active squadron of the fleet, and became the flagship of Konteradmiral (Rear Admiral) Maximilian Daublebsky von Sterneck the following day. The ship then sailed to Trieste, before departing on 14 February for Spain. While on the way, she stopped in Gravosa for six days due to bad weather. From there, she sailed to Messina, Italy, where she received a warm welcome from the local authorities. From there, she passed through the Strait of Bonifacio before arriving in Barcelona, Spain, on 4 March. She was joined there by the screw corvette Frundsberg, and the two ships then sailed on to Cartagena. Kaiser then departed from Frundsberg and visited a number of ports, including Cádiz, Málaga, Valencia, Gibraltar, and Tangier in Alawi Morocco. While in Gibraltar, Kaiser met the screw corvette Fasana, and the two ships returned to Barcelona, were they joined Frundsberg and the gunboat Dalmat. The four ships conducted shooting practice together while in the area. During this period, on 16 March, Kaiser encountered the Italian screw corvette Principessa Clotilde, the captain of which invited Kaiser to join the Italians for a celebration of the 25th anniversary of the Italian king, Victor Emmanuel II. Kaiser had a similar encounter on 4 July with the United States' sloop Juniata, for a celebration marking the United States' declaration of independence.

The ship did not see further active service. She remained laid up from 1875, spending the first four months of 1876 in the II Reserve, followed by repairs and modifications for the rest of the year. During this period, naval engineers attempted to improve the ship's performance. In 1876, her original screw was replaced with a larger propeller that was 7.62 m (25 ft) in diameter. During speed tests conducted on 7 December, the ship reached 12.72 knots (23.56 km/h; 14.64 mph), more than a knot increase in speed. She was immediately returned to the II Reserve. In 1880, the ship had her rigging reduced and received new boilers. A new secondary battery that consisted of six 9 cm (3.5 in) 24-caliber (cal.) breech-loading guns, two 7 cm (2.8 in) 15-cal. guns, four 47 mm (1.9 in) 33-cal. quick-firing guns, three 47 mm Hotchkiss revolver cannon, and four 25 mm (0.98 in) machine guns was installed in 1882. In 1885, three 35 cm (14 in) torpedo tubes were added, one in the bow and one on each broadside.

A commission examined the ship in 1893 and recommended that the ship was "not suitable for commissioning". The government began negotiations with Venezuela in 1895 to sell Kaiser, but the discussion came to nothing. In 1897, she was stricken from the list of active battleships. The ship was disarmed in 1901, and the following year had her engines removed so she could be used as a barracks ship in Pola. She was formally stricken from the naval register on 4 January 1902, was renamed Bellona, and added to the list of hulks. She served as a barracks ship through World War I. From 1910 to 1917 the staff of the II Reserve was housed aboard the ship, and in 1918 the naval training school staff was brought aboard as well. After the war the ship was seized by Italy as a war prize; her ultimate fate is unknown.
