= List of battleships of Italy =

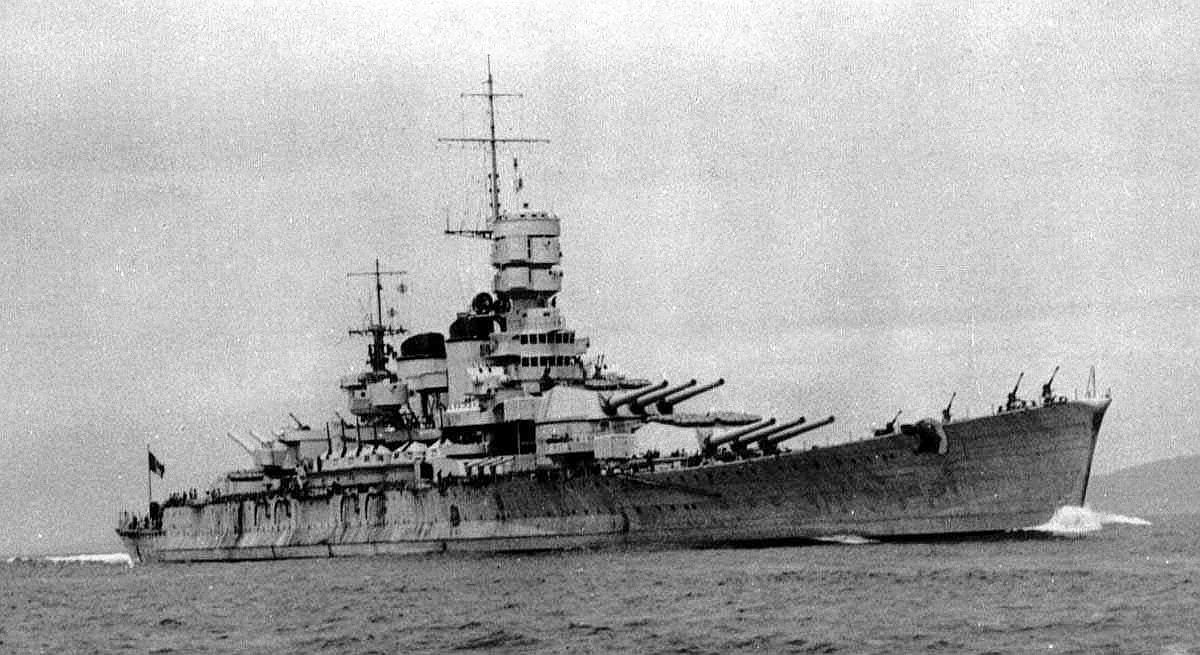
Roma, an Italian Littorio-class battleship

Starting in the 1890s, the Italian Regia Marina (Royal Navy) began building a series of modern battleships. Early designs were marked by their small size, light armor, and high speed compared to contemporary foreign counterparts. The first pre-dreadnought battleship design, the Ammiraglio di Saint Bon class, was constrained by budgetary limits imposed by the legislature. Two ships were ordered by the class's namesake, Admiral Simone de Pacoret Saint Bon, though the design was also influenced by Benedetto Brin, who replaced di Saint Bon as naval minister after his death. Brin designed the next pair of battleships, the Regina Margherita class. These ships were larger than the preceding class, and were intended to challenge the Austro-Hungarian Habsburg-class battleships then under construction. Brin himself died during the construction process. Vittorio Cuniberti designed the next class of small pre-dreadnoughts, the Regina Elena class, which were the fastest battleships in the world at the time of their completion. These ships all served in the Italo-Turkish War of 1911–1912, where they were primarily used to provide naval gunfire support for the Italian ground troops, as the Ottoman Navy largely confined itself to port.

By the time that the Regina Elenas had been built in the early 1900s, the British battleship HMS Dreadnought had been completed, a revolutionary design that rendered all previous battleships obsolete. Therefore, a new dreadnought-type battleship was needed. The new ship was Dante Alighieri, and was designed by Rear Admiral Edoardo Masdea. The Italian Navy built five further battleships to two similar designs: the Conte di Cavour and Andrea Doria classes. These six dreadnoughts formed the core of the Italian fleet during World War I, as a further four-ship class was cancelled. Both the Italian and Austro-Hungarian navies adopted cautious fleet policies and neither chose to risk their capital ships in a major engagement; as a result, the Italian battle line spent the war in harbor and did not see combat. Nevertheless, the dreadnought Leonardo da Vinci was destroyed by a magazine explosion in August 1916. The pre-dreadnought Benedetto Brin was also destroyed by an internal explosion in September 1915, and her sister Regina Margherita was sunk by a German mine in December 1916. The remaining battleships of the Ammiraglio di Saint Bon and Regina Elena classes were discarded after the end of the war.

In the interwar period, the Italian Navy—along with the rest of the major naval powers—was limited by the Washington Naval Treaty, which granted Italy parity with the French Navy. The Italians had 70,000 long tons (71,000 t) worth of battleship tonnage available for new vessels before they would reach their treaty limits, but they avoided new construction in the 1920s due to severe budgetary problems and to avoid a naval arms race with France. These financial limitations also forced the Italians to scrap Dante Alighieri in 1928. Nevertheless, the Regia Marina decided to make use of its excess tonnage by the early 1930s, which resulted in the four Littorio-class battleships. Two were finished early in World War II and were used extensively to escort convoys during the North African Campaign. The third ship, Roma, was finished in 1942, but was sunk in September 1943 by a German radio-controlled bomb when Italy surrendered to the Allies. The fourth ship, Impero, was never finished and was instead sunk by American bombers and scrapped after the end of the war. The two surviving ships, Littorio and Vittorio Veneto, were surrendered to the Allies and were later broken up for scrap. Of the surviving members of the Conte di Cavour class, Conte di Cavour was scrapped after the end of the war and Giulio Cesare was surrendered to the Soviet Union as war reparations. Only the two Andrea Doria-class battleships survived in Italian service for any significant length of time after the conclusion of hostilities; both served as training ships until the mid-1950s, when they too were broken up for scrap.

Key
Armament	The number and type of the primary armament
Armor	The thickness of the belt armor
Displacement	Ship displacement at full combat load
Propulsion	Number of shafts, type of propulsion system, and top speed/horsepower generated
Service	The dates work began and finished on the ship and its ultimate fate
Laid down	The date the keel began to be assembled
Commissioned	The date the ship was commissioned

== Pre-dreadnought battleships ==
=== Ammiraglio di Saint Bon class ===
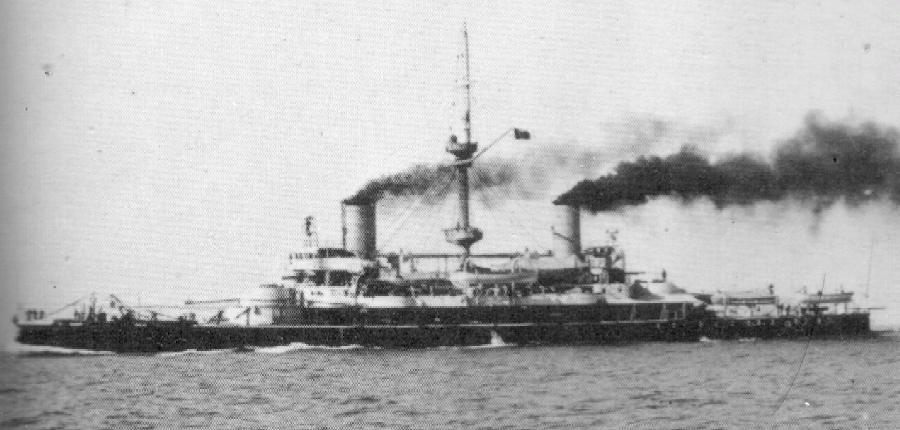
Ammiraglio di Saint Bon underway

The first of the Italian Navy's modern battleships, the Ammiraglio di Saint Bon class was smaller than its contemporaries due to limitations imposed by the Italian government and indecision in the naval design staff over what kind of battleship should be built. They were designed under the supervision of Admiral Simone di Pacoret Saint Bon, the namesake of the lead ship, and Benedetto Brin. Ultimately, the ships' small size, weak main battery, and slow speed made them ineffective capital ships, since they were not strong enough to engage foreign battleships, and too slow to catch cruisers.

Both ships served in the active duty squadron early in their careers, and participated in the Italo-Turkish War of 1911–1912. They took part in the Italian offensives in North Africa and the island of Rhodes, but did not see combat with the Ottoman fleet. They were reduced to harbor defense ships by the outbreak of World War I, and spent the war in Venice. The ships were discarded shortly after the end of the war, both having been stricken in 1920.

Summary of the Ammiraglio di Saint Bon class
Ship	Armament	Armor	Displacement	Propulsion	Service		
Ship	Armament	Armor	Displacement	Propulsion	Laid down	Commissioned	Fate
Ammiraglio di Saint Bon	4 × 10 in (254 mm) guns	9.8 in (249 mm)	10,531 long tons (10,700 t)	2 shafts, 2 triple-expansion steam engines, 14,000 ihp (10,400 kW), 18 kn (33 km/h; 21 mph)	18 July 1893	24 May 1901	Discarded, 1920
Emanuele Filiberto	4 × 10 in (254 mm) guns	9.8 in (249 mm)	9,940 long tons (10,100 t)	2 shafts, 2 triple-expansion steam engines, 14,000 ihp (10,400 kW), 18 kn (33 km/h; 21 mph)	5 October 1893	16 April 1902	Discarded, 1920

=== Regina Margherita class ===
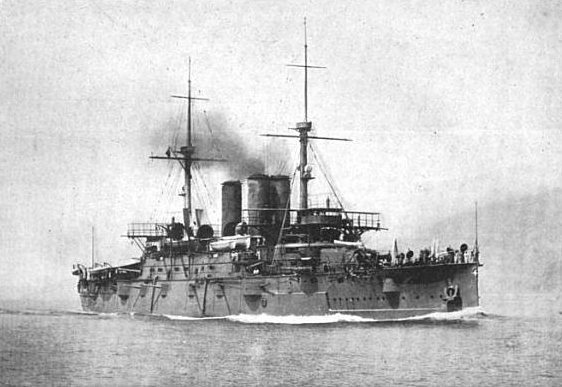
Regina Margherita on sea trials in 1904

The pattern of experimentation in Italian capital ship construction continued with the Regina Margherita class. The negative experience with the Ammiraglio di Saint Bon class convinced the constructors, led by Benedetto Brin, to design a larger battleship that could engage its foreign counterparts. The new class was designed specifically to counter the new Habsburg-class battleships of the Austro-Hungarian Navy. For this purpose, the ships were armed with the 12-inch (305 mm) gun that had become standard for most pre-dreadnought battleships of the day. As was typical for Italian capital ships of the period, armor protection was reduced in order to secure high speed. Brin died during the construction process, and the Italian Navy named the second vessel after him.

The two ships also saw action in the Italo-Turkish War, alongside the Ammiraglio di Saint Bon class in the 3rd Division of the fleet. Benedetto Brin took part in the attack on Tripoli in October 1911, and both ships were involved in the campaign to seize Rhodes in the eastern Aegean Sea. The Regina Margherita class had become obsolete by the outbreak of World War I and had been reduced to training ships. Both were lost during the war: Benedetto Brin to an internal explosion in Brindisi in September 1915, and Regina Margherita to a German mine in December 1916.

Summary of the Regina Margherita class
Ship	Armament	Armor	Displacement	Propulsion	Service		
Ship	Armament	Armor	Displacement	Propulsion	Laid down	Commissioned	Fate
Regina Margherita	4 × 12 in (305 mm) guns	6 in (152 mm)	14,093 long tons (14,319 t)	2 shafts, 2 triple-expansion steam engines, 20,000 ihp (15,000 kW), 20 kn (37 km/h; 23 mph)	20 November 1898	14 April 1904	Sunk, 1916
Benedetto Brin	4 × 12 in (305 mm) guns	6 in (152 mm)	14,737 long tons (14,973 t)	2 shafts, 2 triple-expansion steam engines, 20,000 ihp (15,000 kW), 20 kn (37 km/h; 23 mph)	30 January 1899	1 September 1905	Destroyed, 1915

=== Regina Elena class ===
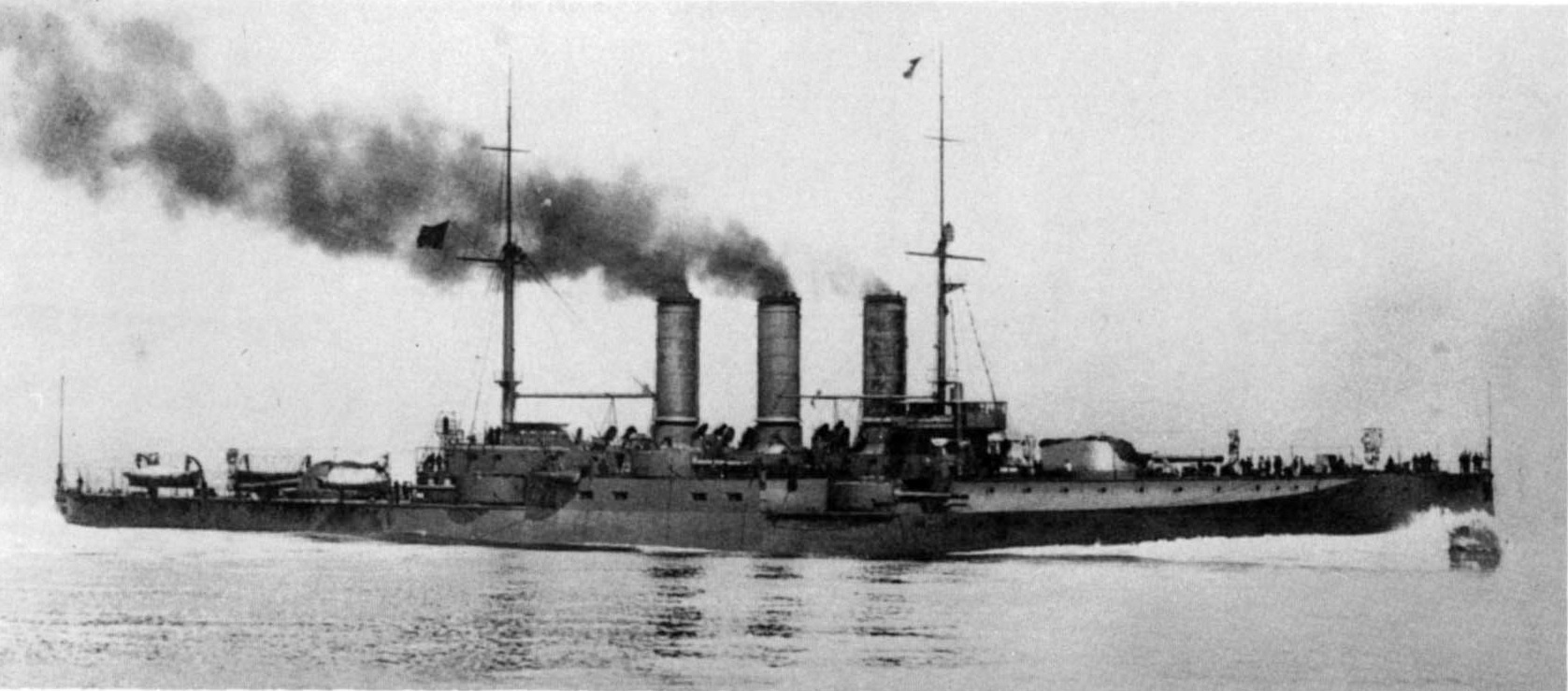
Regina Elena 1907

The final class of Italian pre-dreadnoughts were designed by Vittorio Cuniberti, the naval architect whose projected design for the first "all-big-gun" battleship would quickly make the Regina Elena class obsolescent. These ships sacrificed two of the 12-inch guns to obtain a powerful secondary battery of twelve 8-inch (203 mm) guns. Their high speed—the fastest of any battleship then built, including the revolutionary, turbine-powered HMS Dreadnought—permitted them to also engage cruisers.

All four ships served in the 1st Division of the Italian fleet during the Italo-Turkish War, and were the workhorses of the operations off North Africa and in the eastern Mediterranean. During World War I, the ships were primarily based in Brindisi, Taranto, and Valona; they saw no action during the war due to the cautious fleet policies adopted by both the Italian and Austro-Hungarian navies. The ships remained in the Italian fleet for a few years after the war, but all were discarded and broken up for scrap by 1927.

Summary of the Regina Elena class
Ship	Armament	Armor	Displacement	Propulsion	Service		
Ship	Armament	Armor	Displacement	Propulsion	Laid down	Commissioned	Fate
Regina Elena	2 × 12 in guns	9.8 in	13,914 long tons (14,137 t)	2 shafts, 2 triple-expansion steam engines, 20,000 ihp (15,000 kW), 22 kn (41 km/h; 25 mph)	27 March 1901	11 September 1907	Discarded, 1923
Vittorio Emanuele	2 × 12 in guns	9.8 in	13,914 long tons (14,137 t)	2 shafts, 2 triple-expansion steam engines, 20,000 ihp (15,000 kW), 22 kn (41 km/h; 25 mph)	18 September 1901	1 August 1908	Discarded, 1923
Roma	2 × 12 in guns	9.8 in	13,914 long tons (14,137 t)	2 shafts, 2 triple-expansion steam engines, 20,000 ihp (15,000 kW), 22 kn (41 km/h; 25 mph)	20 September 1903	17 December 1908	Discarded, 1927
Napoli	2 × 12 in guns	9.8 in	13,914 long tons (14,137 t)	2 shafts, 2 triple-expansion steam engines, 20,000 ihp (15,000 kW), 22 kn (41 km/h; 25 mph)	21 October 1903	1 September 1908	Discarded, 1926

== Dreadnoughts ==
=== Dante Alighieri ===
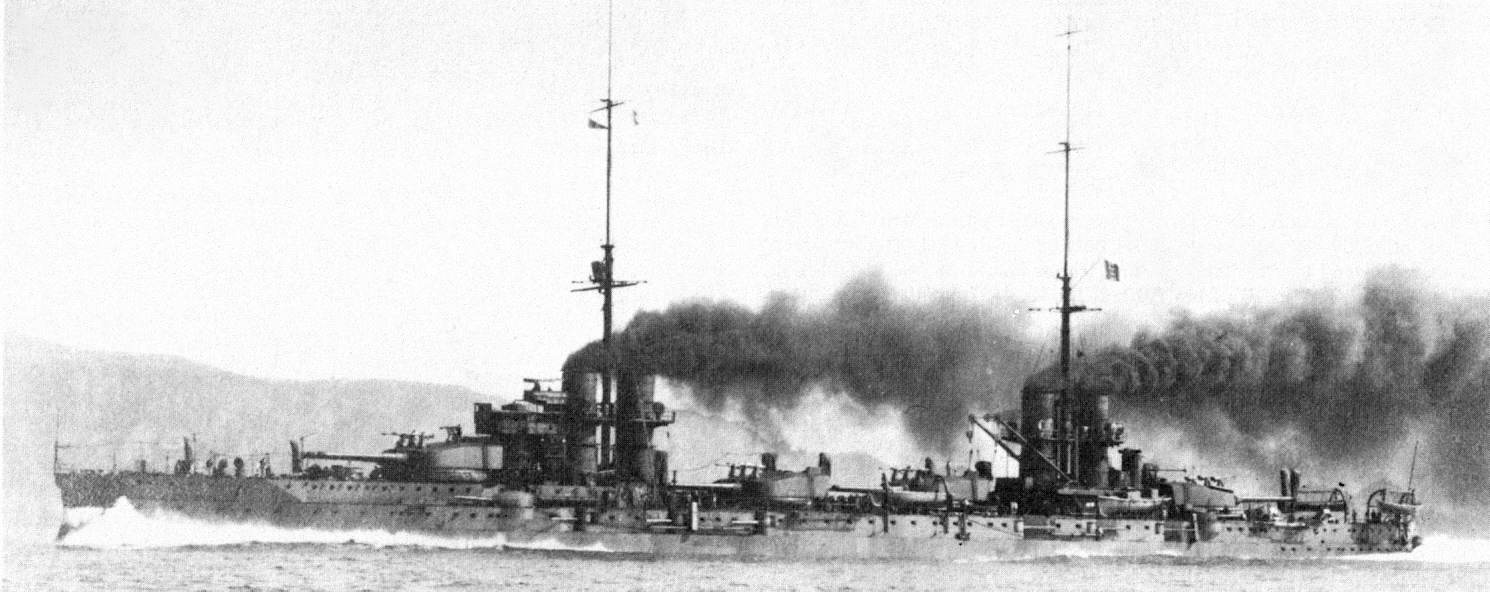
Dante Alighieri at high speed

Dante Alighieri was the first dreadnought battleship built by the Italian Navy, and was designed by Rear Admiral Edoardo Masdea. Cuniberti's call for heavy artillery arranged to emphasize broadside fire led to the placement of four triple 12-inch gun turrets along the centerline. This allowed a broadside of all twelve guns, while the first generation of British dreadnoughts could only fire eight of their guns on the broadside. Dante Alighieri was the first battleship to mount her main battery in triple turrets, though the Austro-Hungarian SMS Viribus Unitis was completed first.

The ship had a very limited service life. At the outbreak of World War I, she was the flagship of the 1st Battle Squadron, based in Taranto. But due to the policy of restraint adopted by the Italian Navy, Dante Alighieri and the other battleships of the Italian fleet saw no action. Financial limitations in the post-war period forced the navy to scrap the ship to reduce the naval budget. The ship was accordingly stricken on 1 July 1928 and sold for scrap.

Summary of the Dante Alighieri class
Ship	Armament	Armor	Displacement	Propulsion	Service		
Ship	Armament	Armor	Displacement	Propulsion	Laid down	Commissioned	Fate
Dante Alighieri	12 × 12 in guns	10 in	21,600 long tons (21,947 t)	4 shafts, 4 steam turbines, 32,190 shp (24,000 kW), 22.83 kn (42.28 km/h; 26.27 mph)	6 June 1909	15 January 1913	Discarded, 1928

=== Conte di Cavour class ===
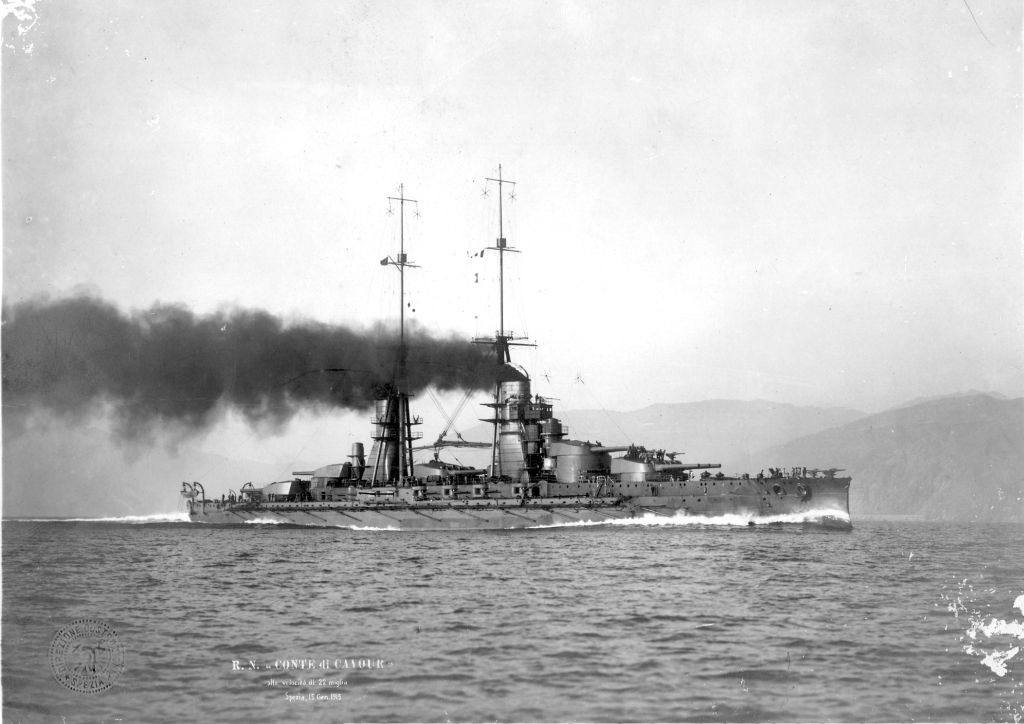
Conte di Cavour as originally built

The first design in the second generation of Italian dreadnoughts, the Conte di Cavour class was also designed by Edoardo Masdea. They were ordered in response to the French Courbet-class battleships. They remedied many of the deficiencies of the previous design; the most significant improvement was a dramatically more effective arrangement of the main battery. Ten guns were arranged in twin turrets superfiring over triple turrets forward and aft, and a third triple turret was placed amidships. All thirteen guns could fire on the broadside, but the firing arcs for most of the guns were significantly improved.

The three ships had limited careers during World War I, and did not see action. On the night of 2/3 August 1916, Leonardo da Vinci was sunk by an internal explosion. She was raised in 1919; the navy planned to repair and modernize her, but lacked sufficient funds, and she was sold in 1923. The two surviving ships were heavily rebuilt in the mid-1930s, and both saw action during World War II. On the night of 11/12 November 1940, both ships were attacked by British torpedo bombers in the Battle of Taranto. Conte di Cavour was badly damaged, and had not been fully repaired when Italy surrendered in September 1943. Giulio Cesare meanwhile escaped unscathed, and participated in the battles of Cape Spartivento and First Sirte in November 1940 and December 1941, respectively. After the end of the war, Conte di Cavour was scrapped, and Giulio Cesare was surrendered to the Soviet Union. Renamed Novorossiysk, she was ultimately sunk in October 1955 by an old German mine left over from World War II. Her wreck was later salvaged in 1957 and broken up thereafter.

Summary of the Conte di Cavour class
Ship	Armament	Armor	Displacement	Propulsion	Service		
Ship	Armament	Armor	Displacement	Propulsion	Laid down	Commissioned	Fate
Conte di Cavour	13 × 12 in guns	10 in	24,250 long tons (24,639 t)	4 shafts, 4 steam turbines, 31,278 shp (23,324 kW), 22.2 kn (41.1 km/h; 25.5 mph)	10 August 1910	1 April 1915	Scrapped, 1947–1952
Giulio Cesare	13 × 12 in guns	10 in	24,801 long tons (25,199 t)	4 shafts, 4 steam turbines, 30,700 shp (22,900 kW), 21.56 kn (39.93 km/h; 24.81 mph)	24 June 1910	14 May 1914	Ceded to the USSR, 1948 destroyed in 1955 by a mine
Leonardo da Vinci	13 × 12 in guns	10 in	24,677 long tons (25,073 t)	4 shafts, 4 steam turbines, 32,300 shp (24,100 kW), 21.6 kn (40.0 km/h; 24.9 mph)	18 July 1910	17 May 1914	Sunk, 1916

=== Andrea Doria class ===
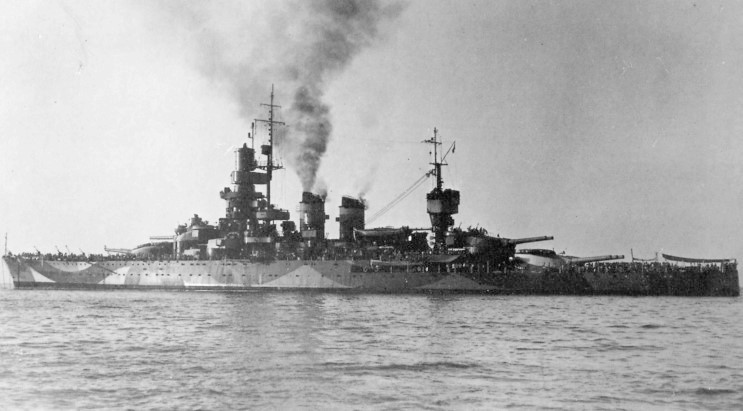
Andrea Doria after her reconstruction in 1937

Vice Admiral Giuseppe Valsecchi was responsible for the next battleship design, the Andrea Doria class. The class comprised two vessels—Andrea Doria and Duilio—and the design was based on the previous Conte di Cavour with minor modifications. These two ships were ordered in response to the French Bretagne class. As with the Conte di Cavours, the two Andrea Doria-class battleships were significantly modernized in the late 1930s along similar lines: the central turret was removed, the propulsion system was completely replaced with more efficient machinery, and the secondary battery was replaced with new turret-mounted guns.

The two ships entered service in 1916, and were based in Taranto with the rest of the main fleet for the duration of World War I. Both ships were involved in the Corfu incident in 1923. The ships' modernization work was completed after Italy entered World War II. Duilio was damaged at the Battle of Taranto, while Andrea Doria was not hit. Both ships were present at the First Battle of Sirte, though only Andrea Doria engaged British forces. The two ships survived the war, and were the only battleships the Allies permitted Italy to retain after the conclusion of hostilities. They served in the Italian Navy for another decade until they were discarded in the mid-1950s.

Summary of the Andrea Doria class
Ship	Armament	Armor	Displacement	Propulsion	Service		
Ship	Armament	Armor	Displacement	Propulsion	Laid down	Commissioned	Fate
Andrea Doria	13 × 12 in guns	10 in	24,729 long tons (25,126 t)	4 shafts, 4 steam turbines, 30,000 shp (22,000 kW), 21 kn (39 km/h; 24 mph)	24 March 1912	13 March 1916	Discarded, 1956
Duilio	13 × 12 in guns	10 in	24,715 long tons (25,112 t)	4 shafts, 4 steam turbines, 30,000 shp (22,000 kW), 21 kn (39 km/h; 24 mph)	24 February 1912	10 May 1915	Discarded, 1956

=== Francesco Caracciolo class ===
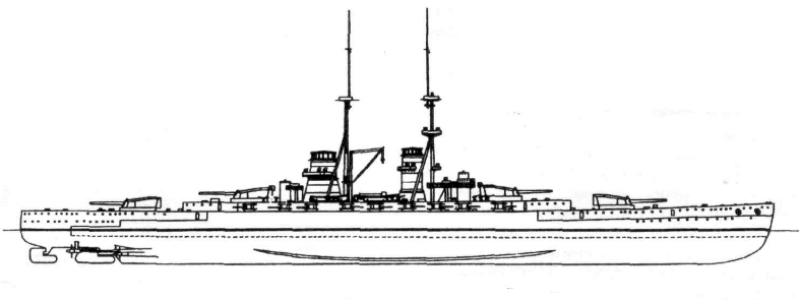
Line-drawing of the Francesco Caracciolo class

The next Italian battleship design represented a major qualitative step forward. The design was prepared by Rear Admiral Edgardo Ferrati, and was intended to match the latest foreign battleships, such as the British Queen Elizabeth class. The new ships were to be armed with a main battery of eight 15 in (381 mm) guns and had a top speed of 28 knots (52 km/h; 32 mph), much faster than any contemporary design. The Francesco Caracciolo class was ordered in 1914; the lead ship was laid down that year, and the other three vessels were laid down in 1915. After Italy entered World War I in May 1915, work slowed dramatically, as resources were diverted to more pressing needs. Work on the ships stopped completely by March 1916, and the three ships begun in 1915 were scrapped shortly after the end of the war. In 1919, the Italian Navy considered completing Francesco Caracciolo as an aircraft carrier similar to the British HMS Argus or as a floatplane carrier, but both proposals were too expensive for the cash-strapped navy. Ultimately, she was broken up for scrap in 1926.

Summary of the Francesco Caracciolo class
Ship	Armament	Armor	Displacement	Propulsion	Service		
Ship	Armament	Armor	Displacement	Propulsion	Laid down	Commissioned	Fate
Francesco Caracciolo	8 × 15 in (381 mm) guns	11.875 in (301.6 mm)	34,000 long tons (34,546 t)	4 shafts, 4 steam turbines, 105,000 shp (78,000 kW), 28 kn (52 km/h; 32 mph)	16 October 1914	—	Scrapped, 1926
Cristoforo Colombo	8 × 15 in (381 mm) guns	11.875 in (301.6 mm)	34,000 long tons (34,546 t)	4 shafts, 4 steam turbines, 105,000 shp (78,000 kW), 28 kn (52 km/h; 32 mph)	14 March 1915	—	Discarded, 1921
Marcantonio Colonna	8 × 15 in (381 mm) guns	11.875 in (301.6 mm)	34,000 long tons (34,546 t)	4 shafts, 4 steam turbines, 105,000 shp (78,000 kW), 28 kn (52 km/h; 32 mph)	3 March 1915	—	Discarded, 1921
Francesco Morosini	8 × 15 in (381 mm) guns	11.875 in (301.6 mm)	34,000 long tons (34,546 t)	4 shafts, 4 steam turbines, 105,000 shp (78,000 kW), 28 kn (52 km/h; 32 mph)	27 June 1915	—	Discarded, 1921

=== Littorio class ===
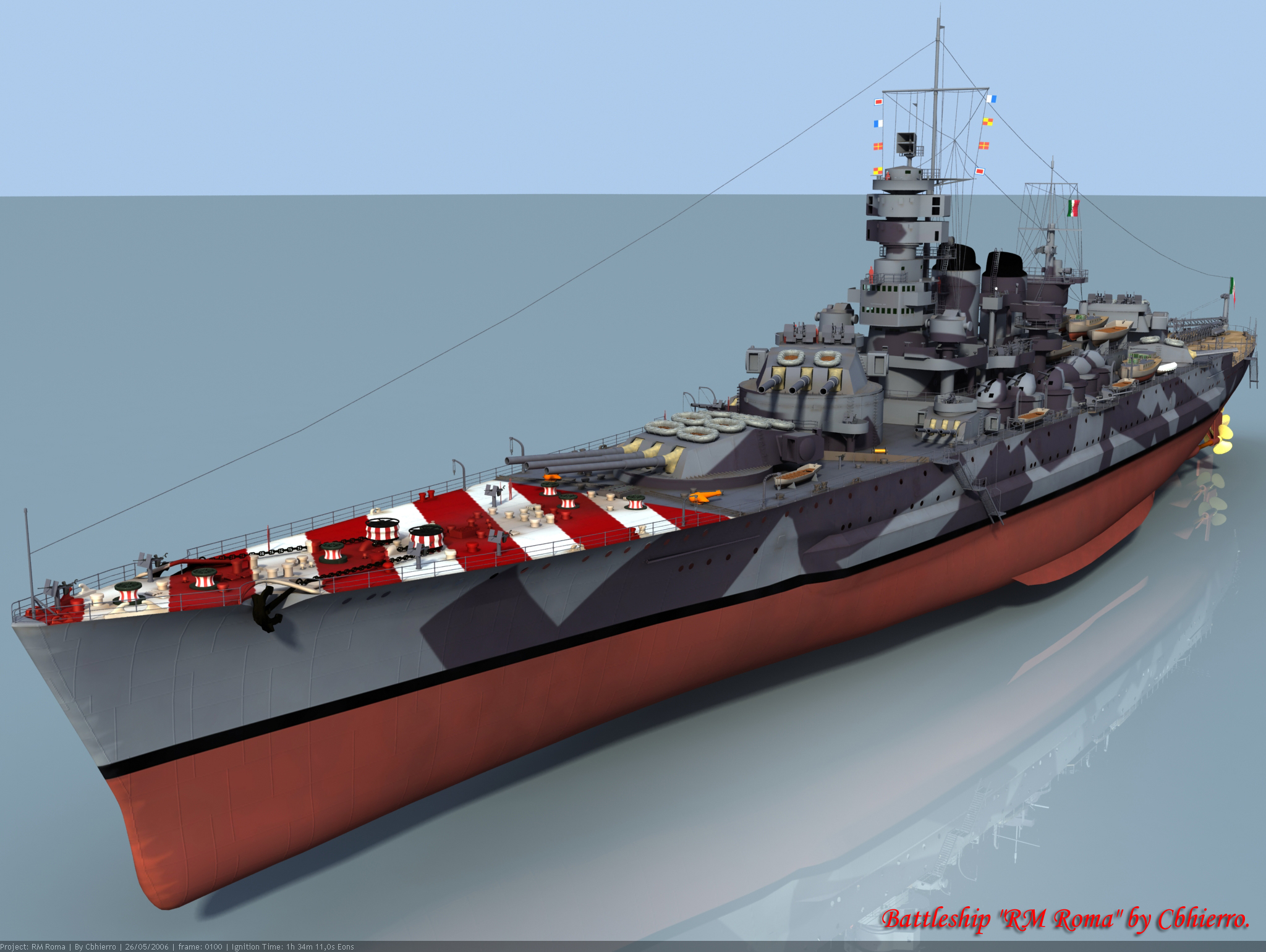
CG rendering of Roma

The final group of Italian battleships was the Littorio class. These ships, which weighed in excess of 40,000 long tons (41,000 t) standard displacement, violated the naval arms limitation system created by the Washington Naval Treaty of 1922. The ships were armed with a battery of nine 15-inch guns in three triple turrets, and they incorporated a novel underwater protection system designed by Umberto Pugliese. Littorio and Vittorio Veneto were laid down in 1934 and completed in early 1940; a second pair, Roma and Impero, were laid down in 1938. Roma was finished in mid-1942, while Impero was not completed.

The first two ships entered service in August 1940, shortly after Italy joined World War II. Littorio was badly damaged in the November 1940 raid on Taranto, and repairs lasted until March 1941. Vittorio Veneto was undamaged, and later that month took part in the Battle of Cape Spartivento. In March 1941, she was damaged by British torpedo bombers after the Battle of Cape Matapan. Both ships were back in action for the First and Second Battle of Sirte in January and March 1942, respectively. By the end of the year, Roma was ready for service and replaced Littorio as the fleet flagship. After Benito Mussolini fell from power in July 1943, Littorio was renamed Italia. During the Italian surrender in September 1943, Roma was hit by a pair of Fritz-X guided glide bombs; her ammunition magazines blew up in a tremendous explosion and she quickly sank. Italia was hit by one Fritz-X and was badly damaged. The United States and Britain received Italia and Vittorio Veneto, respectively, in the peace treaty; both ships were scrapped in the late 1940s, as was the incomplete Impero.

Summary of the Littorio class
Ship	Armament	Armor	Displacement	Propulsion	Service		
Ship	Armament	Armor	Displacement	Propulsion	Laid down	Commissioned	Fate
Littorio/Italia	9 × 15 in guns	11 in (279 mm)	45,236 long tons (45,962 t)	4 shafts, 4 steam turbines, 128,200 shp (95,600 kW), 30 kn (56 km/h; 35 mph)	28 October 1934	6 May 1940	Scrapped, 1948–1955
Vittorio Veneto	9 × 15 in guns	11 in (279 mm)	45,029 long tons (45,752 t)	4 shafts, 4 steam turbines, 128,200 shp (95,600 kW), 30 kn (56 km/h; 35 mph)	28 October 1934	28 April 1940	Scrapped, 1948–1951
Roma	9 × 15 in guns	11 in (279 mm)	45,485 long tons (46,215 t)	4 shafts, 4 steam turbines, 128,200 shp (95,600 kW), 30 kn (56 km/h; 35 mph)	18 September 1938	14 June 1942	Sunk, 1943
Impero	9 × 15 in guns	11 in (279 mm)	45,236 long tons (45,962 t)	4 shafts, 4 steam turbines, 128,200 shp (95,600 kW), 30 kn (56 km/h; 35 mph)	14 May 1938	—	Scrapped, 1948–1950

== See also ==
- List of battleships
- List of ironclad warships of Italy
- List of ships of the line of Italy
