= Pilcher =

Pilcher is a surname. Notable people with the surname include:

- Brian Pilcher (born 1935), Australian footballer
- Charles Pilcher (1844–1916), Australian barrister and politician
- Ernie Pilcher (1896–1980), British cyclist and Olympics competitor
- Frederick Pilcher (born 1939), physics professor and photometrist
- George Pilcher (1801–1855), English aural surgeon and medical reformer
- Jane Pilcher (PhD 1992), British sociologist
- John Pilcher (1766–1838), English cricketer
- Sir John Arthur Pilcher (1912–1990), British diplomat
- J. L. Pilcher (a.k.a. John Leonard Pilcher; 1898–1981), American politician
- Joshua Pilcher (1790–1843), American fur trader and Indian agent
- Lewis Pilcher (1871–1941), American academic and architect
- Marc Pilcher (1967–2021), British hair stylist and make-up artist
- Mary Pilcher-Cook (born 1954), American politician
- Norman Pilcher (1935–2021), British police officer and criminal
- Percy Pilcher (1866–1899), British inventor and aviator
- Percy William Pilcher (1866–1937), British organist, composer, and photography pioneer
- Robert Stuart Pilcher (1882–1961), British transport engineer and author on transport policy
- Robin Pilcher (born 1950), British author; son of Rosamunde
- Rosamunde Pilcher (1924–2019), British author; mother of Robin
- Theodore C. Pilcher (1844–1917), American politician
- Thomas Pilchard (a.k.a. Thomas Pilcher; 1557–1587), English Roman Catholic priest and martyr
- Thomas Pilcher (1858–1928), British army officer
- Venn Pilcher (1879–1961), British Anglican bishop and author
- William S. Pilcher (1803–1858), American politician

== See also ==
- 1990 Pilcher, asteroid
- Pilcher and Tachau, American architectural firm
- Pilcher Monument in Sark, Channel Islands
- Pilchard (disambiguation)
