= Ichnusa =

Ichnusa may refer to:

- an older Greek name for the island of Sardinia
- Birra Ichnusa, a Sardinian beer brand owned by Heineken

== Ships ==
- Ichnusa (1986–1988); regional-class RO-RO passenger ferry operated by Tirrenia – Compagnia italiana di navigazione
- Ichnusa; passenger ferry operated by Saremar
- Ichnusa; RO-RO passenger cargo ferry built by Fincantieri – Cantieri Navali Italiani S.p.A.; see List of ships built by Fincantieri
- Ichnusa; 19th-century Gulnara-class aviso of the Piedmontese Navy, see List of ships of the line of Italy

== Animals ==
- Aglais ichnusa, a butterfly found on Corsica and Sardinia
- Ichnusa (cnidarian), an extinct genus of cnidarian from the Ediacaran of Italy

== See also ==
- Nuragic civilization
- Nuragic language
- Sardinia (disambiguation)
