= Sardinia (disambiguation) =

Sardinia is an island in the Mediterranean Sea.

Sardinia may also refer to:

== Island of Sardinia ==
- Politics of Sardinia
  - Elections in Sardinia
  - List of presidents of Sardinia
  - List of political parties in Sardinia
- Music of Sardinia
- People from Sardinia
- History of Sardinia
  - The Kingdom of Sardinia, a former Spanish and Savoyard kingdom
  - List of monarchs of Sardinia
  - List of viceroys of Sardinia
  - History of mining in Sardinia
  - History of the Jews in Sardinia
- Languages of Sardinia
- List of tourist attractions in Sardinia
- List of archaeological and artistic sites of Sardinia

== Places in the United States ==
- Sardinia, Indiana
- Sardinia, New York
- Sardinia, Ohio

== Other ==
- Sardinia (plant genus), a former genus in the family Rubiaceae

== See also ==
- Sardina (disambiguation)
- Sardine (disambiguation)
- Ichnusa (disambiguation)
