= Ichnusa cocozzi =

Ichnusa cocozzi Temporal range: Ediacaran, 635–541 Ma
- The holotype of Ichnusa cocozzi, representing the only preserved evidence for the tentacles in the organism. This holotype was described in 1981.

Scientific classification
- Kingdom: Animalia
- Phylum: Cnidaria
- Class: Scyphozoa
- Order: incertae sedis
- Family: incertae sedis
- Genus: ✝Ichnusa Debrenne & Naud, 1981
- Species: ✝I. cocozzi

Binomial name
- ✝Ichnusa cocozzi Debrenne & Naud, 1981

Discoidal-pyramidal shaped Cnidarian

Ichnusa is a genus of discoidal (although this is due to preservation) cnidarians that existed during the Ediacaran, 635-541 million years ago (MYA) discovered on the island of Sardinia, Italy. The genus is monotypic, only containing the species Ichnusa cocozzi. Palaeontologists think that Ichnusa represented a cnidarian of unknown affinities, with I. cocozzi being put in the Scyphozoa.

== Morphology, anatomy & behavior ==
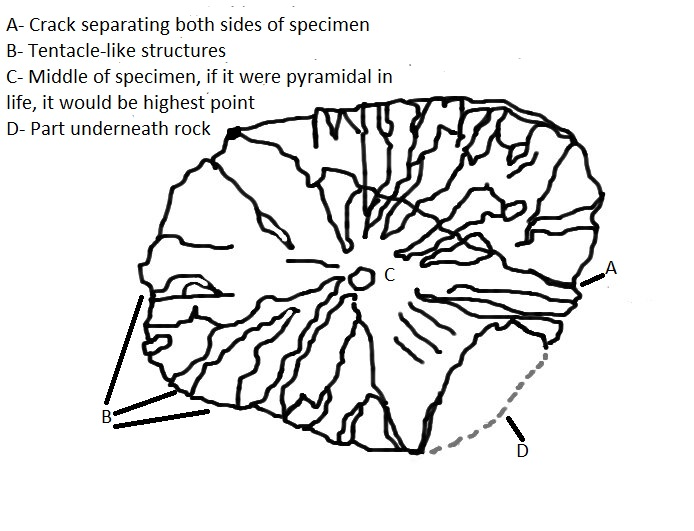
A simple line drawing of the holotype of Ichnusa cocozzi. A- Crack separating both sides of the holotype B- Tentacle-like structures C- Middle of specimen, if it were to be pyramidal in life, it would be the uppermost point D- Part underneath rock/not visible.

Ichnusa cocozzi is described as a hemispherical or pyramidal scyphozoan that inhabited the Ediacaran period. Three individuals of I. cocozzi have been described: one holotype and two paratypes. None of the individuals preserve their internal organs, and the holotype is the only one to preserve tentacles. The holotype has a diameter of 27.6 mm x 20 mm. The tentacles preserved in the holotype are 1.2 mm long, and between 0.25 and 0.5 mm wide. This scyphozoan had four radial lobes that come out of a center that doesn’t have any structure preserved. These lobes subdivide into 2, and then into 4 more smaller lobes. It is difficult to know if the organism had a gastrovascular system of four or eight first-order lobes. Ichnusa cocozzi was a marine organism.

== Method of fossilization ==
Ichnusa. cocozzi fossils have been discovered on the San Vito Formation, in Italy. There are several other medusoid fossils found on this place. The fossils found are molds that are circular or oval in shape. The molds form a fine silt pellicle that are darker than the rest of the rock. As mentioned before, medusoids (including I. cocozzi) found in the San Vito Formation are believed to be pyramidal or hemispherical, but because of the weight of the superincumbent strata, they have all been flattened

== Discovery ==
The holotype of Ichnusa cocozzi was unearthed in the Sarrabus area of Sardinia, Italy. Due to polyphase deformation, the San Vito Formation is of uncertain stratigraphic age. However, the fossils found in the formation suggest a late Ediacaran age. Fossils were found within a 700 meters thick series of grits, quartzites, and shales that were green and yellow in color.

== Other notable characteristics ==
When described, the complexity of the gastrovascular system of I. cocozzi resembled the one found in the trilobozoan Albumares, described by Fedonkin (1976) from the Valdai horizon on the Onega Peninsula. Ichnusa cocozzi specimens also have a superficial similarity with that of the trilobozoan Rugoconites because of its many tentacular-like structures on the holotype. The holotype of Ichnusa represents a form with four- eight-fold symmetry along with possible tentacles, suggesting that it might have been in the class Scyphozoa

== See also ==
- List of Ediacaran genera
- Ichnusa (disambiguation)
