= Sardine (disambiguation) =

A sardine is a small, oily fish related to the herring, family Clupeidae

Sardine or sardines may also refer to other fish:

- Sardinops
- Lake Tanganyika sardine
- Black Sea sprat
- European sprat, aka Brisling sardine

Other fish-related topics:

- Sardine run
- Sardines (food)
  - Canned sardine

Sardine or sardines may also refer to:

- French corvette Sardine, a ship
- Sardines (game), a children's game
- Sardines (Inside No. 9), a pilot of Inside No. 9
- Sardine, Queensland, a locality in Barcaldine Region, Queensland, Australia
- Sardines (political movement), a political movement in Italy since 2019

== See also ==
- Pilchard (disambiguation)
- Sardina (disambiguation)
- Sardinia (disambiguation)
