= Pilchard (disambiguation) =

A pilchard, or sardine, is a small, oily fish related to the herring family, Clupeidae

Pilchard may also refer to:

- European pilchard, Sardina pilchardus, true sardine
- HMS Pilchard, a Royal Navy Ballahoo-class schooner
- Pilchard the Cat, a paradoxically-named character in the Bob the Builder television series
- South American pilchard, Sardinops sagax, a.k.a. Pacific sardine, California sardine, Chilean sardine, South African sardine
- Yellow-eye mullet, Aldrichetta forsteri

== Persons with the surname Pilchard ==
- The Venerable Thomas Pilchard (1557–1587), an English Roman Catholic priest and martyr.

== See also ==
- Pilcher
- Sardine (disambiguation)
