= Sardina =

Sardina may refer to:

- Alexander-Martin Sardina, German-Italian scientist and former member of parliament
- Sardina pilchardus, the European pilchard in the monotypic genus Sardina
- Case Sardina, a district of the city of Calcinaia in the Province of Pisa (Region of Tuscany), Italy

== See also ==
- Sardinia (disambiguation)
- Sardine (disambiguation)
- Sardinas, a surname
