= Sardinas =

Sardinas is a surname. Notable people with the surname include:

- Alberto Sardiñas (born 1978), American author, radio personality, producer, and motivational speaker
- Eric Sardinas (born 1970), American guitarist
- Luis Sardiñas (born 1993), Venezuelan baseball player

== See also ==
- Sardina (disambiguation)
