= Pilcher Monument =

Obelisk in Sark, Channel Islands

Coordinates: 49.4284°N 2.3737°W

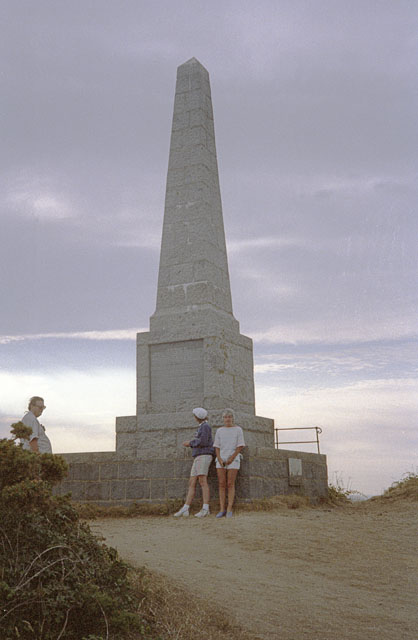
The monument in 1988

The Pilcher Monument is an obelisk in Sark, Channel Islands, erected in memory of JG Pilcher, an oil merchant killed in a boat wreck in 1868. The monument stands above Havre Gosselin bay, the site of the 1868 incident, in which five men were killed. The monument was erected by Pilcher's widow some time after 1886. Its inscription records the sorrow of the Pilcher family but also warns the reader to beware of the coast and to take "caution and warning!".

== Boat wreck ==
In 1868 works were being undertaken to construct a breakwater at Creux harbour on Sark in the Channel Islands. The engineer-in-charge was Agnew Giffard, who made monthly visits from the neighbouring island of Guernsey. He travelled by 18 feet (5.5 m) gig from Guernsey on the morning of 19 October to visit the breakwater, landing at Havre Gosselin bay. Having urgent business in Guernsey he looked to return the same evening with his brother Walter; the breakwater lighthouse keeper Russell Renouf; Dr Gatehouse, a medical officer travelling to Alderney and J. G. Pilcher, an oil merchant from London. The party were warned by local boatmen of poor weather and tidal conditions and were advised to wait and depart the next morning.

The party decided to leave anyway, at around 5pm, though the strength of the wind meant that they were forced to reef their sails before they had even left the bay. It is thought that the gig made two or three tacking movements to weather the La Givaude rocks and reached a point north of the small island of Brecqhou by 8 pm. However the seas were heavier here and the gig was forced back through the Gouliot Passage between Brecqhou and Sark to Havre Gosselin where the gig is thought to have been wrecked.

The gig was later washed ashore some 7 miles (11 km) from Dielette, France. Agnew Giffard's body floated ashore at Havre Gosselin, Walter Giffard was found in a cave at Pointe du Nez near L'Eperquerie, Sark; Renouf was found at the Gouliot Caves on Sark. Pilcher washed ashore at Niton on the Isle of Wight, England; Gatehouse's body was never recovered. It is not thought that the gig capsized as a theodolite, umbrella and pair of binoculars were found within it, though its mast and sail had been blown away.

== Monument ==
Pilcher's widow ordered an obelisk erected on the cliffs above Havre Gosselin, as a memorial to Pilcher and as a warning to of the "uncertainty of life" and of the dangers of this section of coast. It was commissioned from Henrys Monumental Masons of Guernsey, an early project for the company, which only began trading in 1886. The obelisk is made from Guernsey granite with lettering in lead. It is visible from the sea and has become a landmark for passing boats.

The inscription on the monument names the men lost and notes it was erected by Mrs Pilcher and her children as a mark of their love for Pilcher and their sorrow at his loss. It also states their intention "to urge upon others, through the grace and mercy of God, our saviour, caution and warning!". The inscription praises God and contains the text of the nautical-biblical passages Psalm 42:7 and Psalm 77:19.
