= List of ships of the line of Italy =

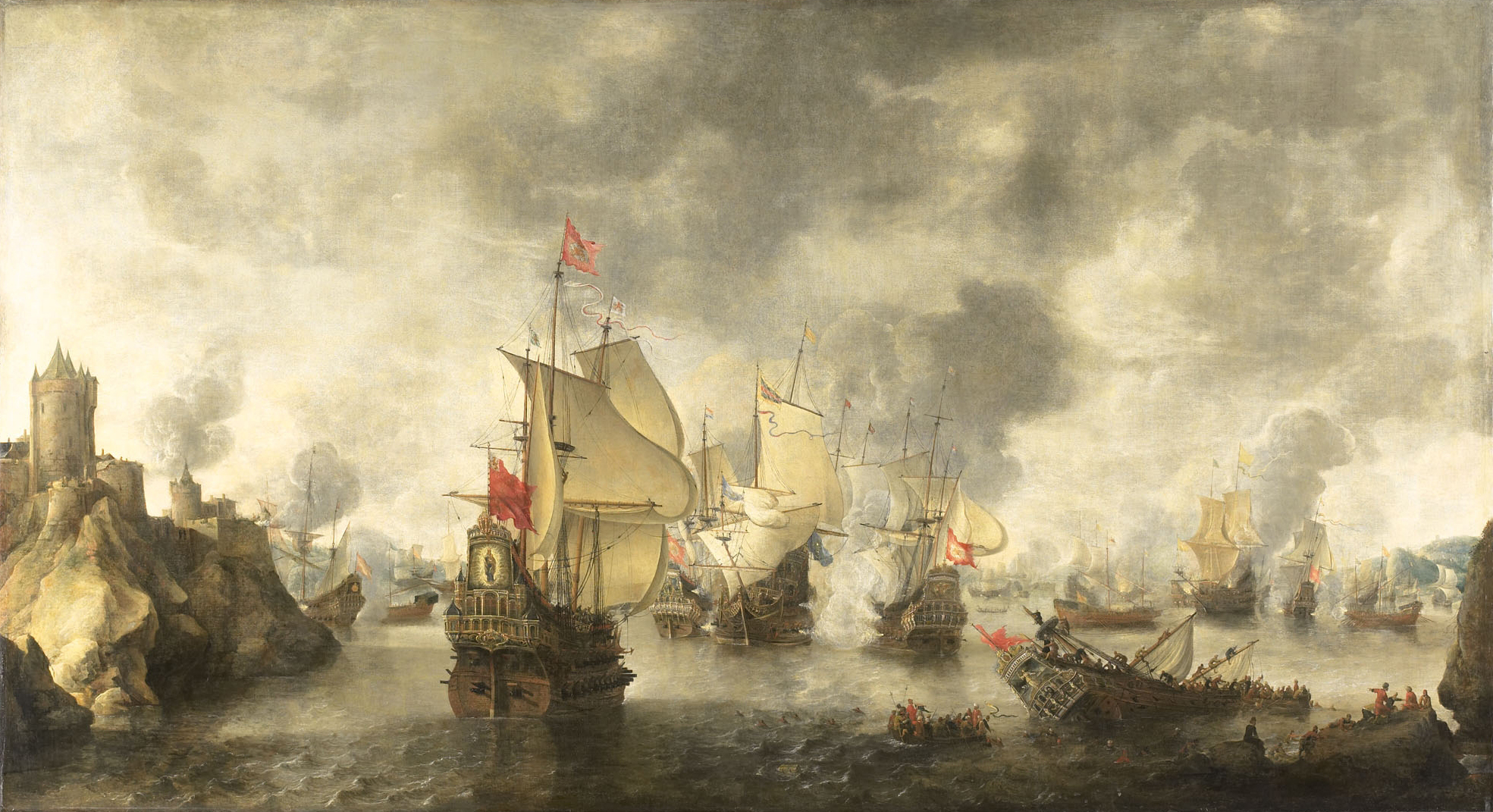
Venetian "Madonna della Vigna" (first on the left) in battle against Ottoman ships in 1649

This is a list of Italian carracks, galleons and ships of the line of the period 1400-1858:
Italy was formed in 1861 with the union of several states, including the Two Sicilies (with Naples), and Piedmont-Sardinia, including Genoa, some Papal states and Tuscany. Later, Venice and Rome joined. Several of these states had their own naval forces. An * after a name indicates that that ship survived until 1861 and was incorporated into the Regia Marina.

== Genoa ==
- Sancta Maria & Sancta Brigida - Captured by England 1409, renamed Le Carake
- ? - Captured by England 1416, renamed George, to Venice 1424
- ? - Captured by England 1416, renamed Marie Hampton
- ? - Captured by England 1416, renamed Marie Sandwich
- Galeas Negre - Captured by England 1417, renamed Andrew
- Pynele - Captured by England 1417, renamed Christopher, sold 1423
- ? - Captured by England 1417, renamed Peter
- Vivande - Captured by England 1417, renamed Paul
- ? - Captured by England c. 1417, renamed Agase, wrecked on mudflats c. 1418

At Battle of Lepanto: Left wing

- Marchesa
- Fortuna

Center

- Capitana
- Padrona
- Capitana (Lomellini family)
- Padrona (Lomellini family)
- Capitana (Grimaldi family)
- Doria
- Perla
- Temperanza
- Vittoria

Right wing

- Capitana (Gian Andrea Doria)
- Donzella
- Monarca
- Capitana (Nicolò Doria)
- Padrona
- Capitana (Negroni family)
- Padrona (Negroni family)
- Negrona
- Bastarda
- Padrona (Lomellini family)
- Furia
- Padrona (Grimaldi family)
- Padrona (De Mari family)
- Diana

Rearguard

- Baccana
- San Bartolomeo

The 18th century

- ? (1695, ex-French Cumberland, sold 1715, ex-British Cumberland 80, captured 1707) - Sold to Spain 1717, captured by Britain at the Battle of Cape Passaro 1718, sold to Austria 1720, renamed San Carlos, BU 1733
- ? (ex-French, sold 1711, ex-British Gloucester 60, captured 1709) - Sold to Spain 1720, renamed Conquistador, Stricken 1738

== Naples/Two Sicilies ==
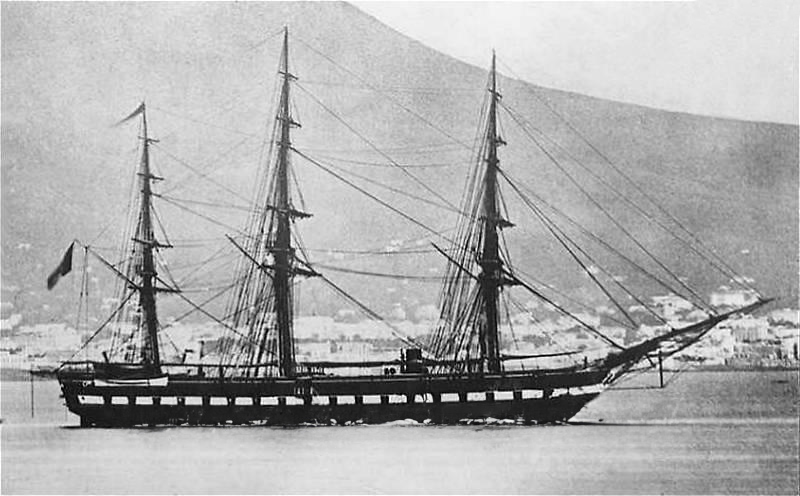
The Garibaldi in the Bay of Naples.

Under Charles III

- San Filippo la Reale 64 - ship of the line
- San Carlo la Partenope 50 - frigate
- Regina 40 - frigate
- Concezione 40 - frigate
- Santa Amalia 40 - frigate
- San Gennaro 20 - xebec
- San Pasquale 20 - xebec
- San Ferdinando 20 - xebec
- San Gabriele 20 - xebec
- San Luigi 20 - xebec
- San Antonio 20 - xebec
- Capitana 3 - galley
- Sant'Antonio 3 - galley
- Patrona 3 - galley
- San Gennaro 3 - galley

Under Ferdinand I

- San Giovanni 60-66 (1768/69, transferred from Malta 1781/84)
- San Gioacchino 70 (1769/70, transferred from Malta 1781/84)
- Partenope 74 - sank on the night between 8 and 9 January 1799 at the mouth of the harbor of Castellammare di Stabia for make it unfit for occupation by the French.
- Tancredi 74 - burnt in 1799 for preventing capture
- Guiscardo 74 - burnt for preventing capture in 1799
- Archimede 74 - broken up in 1813
- Sannita 74 - broken up in 1802
- Ruggiero 60 - ship of the line
- Aretusa 41 - frigate, broken up in 1815
- Minerva 38- frigate, the ship where Nelson hanged up the Admiral Caracciolo
- Sibilla 38 - frigate, broken up in 1815
- Cerere 38 - frigate
- Aurora 38 - corvette, broken up in 1842
- Fortuna 30 - corvette, broken up in 1815
- Fama 28 - corvette, broken up in 1823
- Stabia 24 - corvette, sold to a private in 1820
- Flora 24 - corvette, burnt in 1799 for preventing capture
- Galatea 24 - corvette, broken up in 1836

Napoleonic period

- Capri 84 - ship of the line, broken up in 1847
- Gioacchino 80 - ship of the line, renamed San Ferdinando, broken up after a fire in 1821
- Carolina* 52 - frigate, renamed Amalia in 1815 and Caracciolo in 1861, broken up in 1866
- Vesuvio* 87 - reclassified corvette in the 1861 and demolished in 1865

Under Francis I

- Regina Isabella* 46 - frigate, broken up in 1864
- Francesco I* 32 - corvette, ex royal yacht, converted in warship and renamed Cristina in 1831, broken up in 1866.
- Principe Carlo* 20 - brig, renamed Tronto in 1860 and broken up in 1866

Under Ferdinand II

- Monarca* 84 - steam battleship, renamed Re Galantuomo and broken up in 1875
- Farnese* 70 - steam frigate, captured while still in construction and renamed Italia
- Urania 46 - sail frigate
- Regina* 40 - steam frigate, broken up in 1872
- Partenope* 40 - sail frigate, converted in steam frigate in 1862 and broken up in 1869
- Etna 25 - corvette, broken up in 1859
- Generoso* 20 - brig, broken up in 1864
- Intrepido* 20 - brig, broken up in 1870
- Veloce* 18 - paddle frigate, ex steam cruise ship used by the Sicilian revolutionaries in 1848 as the Indipendenza, captured by the Borbonic navy and renamed Veloce, captured again by the troops of Garibaldi in 1860 and renamed Tukery, scrapped in 1899
- Valoroso* 18 - sail corvette, broken up in 1870
- Zeffiro* 18 - sail corvette, broken up in 1870
- Sannita 12 - paddle frigate, sold while on repair in France in 1860
- Torquato Tasso 12 - paddle frigate, sunk in a storm in 1860
- Carlo III 10 - paddle frigate, exploded after a fire in 1857
- Fulminante* 10 - paddle frigate, ex English merchant ship used by the Sicilian revolutionaries as the Ruggero Settimo, captured by the Borbonic navy and renamed Fulminante, broken up in 1873
- Stromboli* 8 - paddle corvette, broken up in 1866
- Ettore Fieramosca* 6 - paddle frigate, broken up in 1896
- Ferdinando II* 6 - paddle corvette, renamed Stabia in 1860 and broken up in 1864
- Sirena* 5 - paddle aviso, broken up in 1911
- Aquila* 4 - paddle aviso, broken up in 1875
- Maria Teresa* 4 - paddle aviso, renamed Principessa Clotilde in 1860 and Garigliano in 1861, broken up in 1864
- Peloro* 4 - paddle aviso, broken up in 1876
- Delfino* 4 - paddle aviso, decommissioned in 1863
- Two Ercole-class paddle frigates* 10 - Ercole and Archimede
- Four Ruggiero-class paddle frigates* 10 - Ruggiero, Roberto, Guiscardo
- Two Palinuro-class paddle corvettes* 8 - Palinuro and Miseno

Under Francis II

- Borbone* 59 - steam frigate, renamed Giuseppe Garibaldi, renamed Saati and ceded to the Eritrean colonial administration in 1893, serving as hospital ship until 1899
- Gaeta* 54 - steam frigate, captured while still in construction, broken up in 1876
- Etna* 18 - steam corvette, captured while still in construction, decommissioned in 1875

== Papal States ==
- At Battle of Lepanto (1571):
  - Capitana ("flagship")
  - Padrona ("squadron flagship")
  - Suprema (Supreme)
  - Serena (Serene)
  - Pace (Peace)
  - Vittoria (Victoria)
  - Grifona (Gryphon)
  - Santa Maria
  - San Giovanni
  - Regina (Queen)
- San Bonaventura (St. Bonaventure)
- San Pietro 14 - Ex HMS Speedy, an earlier brig gifted to the Pope by Napoleon and broken up in 1807
- San Pietro (1823) a schooner
- Roma, a steamer used during the events of the Roman Republic against the Austrians
- Immacolata Concezione* (Immaculate Conception), a steam corvette

== Tuscany ==
At Battle of Lepanto:

- Capitana
- Grifona
- Toscana
- Pisana
- Pace
- Vittoria
- Fiorenza
- San Giovanni
- Santa Maria
- Serena
- Elbigina

The fleet in 1604

- Capitana
- Padrona
- Fiorenza
- Santa Maria
- Siena
- Pisana
- Livornina

The fleet in 1611

- Padrona vecchia
- Santa Maria
- Magdalena
- San Cosimo
- Capitana
- Santa Margherita
- San Francesco
- San Carlo
- Santa Cristina
- Padrona

The 17th century

- ? (ex-Algerian Star 50, captured 1695)

Ships of the line hired in the 18th century

- San Lorenzo 50-60
- Fenice 50-60
- Porco Spino 50-60
- Burlando 50-60

The 19th century

- Ardita* - steam gunboat
- Curtatone* - steam gunboat
- Palestro* - steam gunboat
- Veloce* - steam gunboat
- Giglio* 2 - sloop
- Feritore* - schooner, ceded to the nautical school of Palermo in 1864
- Argo* - schooner, ceded to the office for the administration of public works, harbors and lighthouses of Genoa

== Piedmont ==
- ? - Captured by Spain 1718, renamed San Juan Bautista, wrecked 1719
- ? - Captured by Spain 1718, renamed Santa Rosa Palermo (Santa Rosalia), scuttled 1719
- ? - Captured by Spain 1718, renamed Triunfo, scuttled 1719

The fleet in 1860

- Vittorio Emanuele* 77 - steam frigate, broken up in 1907
- San Michele* 60 - sail frigate, broken up in 1876
- Carlo Alberto* 53 - steam frigate, broken up in 1876
- Des Geneys* 48 - sail frigate, broken up in 1870
- Euridice* 44 - sail frigate, broken up in 1870
- San Giovanni* 34 - steam corvette, broken up in 1878
- Aquila* 24 - sail corvette, renamed Iride in 1861 and broken up in 1870
- Aurora* 24 - sail corvette, decommissioned in 1866
- Eridano* 16 - brig, broken up in 1869
- Daino* 16 - brig, broken up in 1905
- Colombo* 16 - brig, broken up in 1868
- Governolo* 12 - paddle frigate, broken up in 1883
- Costituzione* 12 - paddle frigate, broken up in 1878
- Staffetta 10 - schooner, broken up in 1862
- L'Azzardoso* 8 - brig, broken up in 1866
- Monzambano* 4 - paddle corvette, broken up in 1876
- Tripoli* 4 -paddle corvette, broken up in 1878
- Malfatano* 4 - paddle corvette, broken up in 1871
- Authion* 3 - paddle aviso, broken up in 1897
- Vinzaglio* - steam gunboat
- Six N 1-class steam gunboats* - N 1, N 2, N 3, N 4, N 5, N 6, decommissioned in 1901
- Six Frassineto-class steam gunboats* - Frassineto, Torrione, Castenedolo, Pozzolengo, Adda and Mincio, decommissioned in 1867
- Two Gulnara-class avisos* 4 - Gulnara and Ichnusa

== Venice ==
- ? (c. 1529) - The world's first galleon, BU 1547?
- ? - Sank 1558
- ? (1570)
- San Giorgio grande
- Silvestra (robbed by corsairs on way to Corfu about 1599 - all killed except 3 sailors)
- Madonna della Vigna (c. 1649)
- Aquila d'Oro - Burnt in action against the Turks 1654
- Giove Fulminante c. 70 (c. 1667) - Discarded 1693?
- Costanza Guerriera c. 70 (c. 1667) - Wrecked 1684
- Drago Volante c. 60 (c. 1674) - Blew up 1695
- Fama Volante 50 (c. 1674) - Discarded 1699?
- Madonna della Salute 50 (c. 1675) - Discarded 1714?
- Venezia Trionfante c. 60 (1670s) - Wrecked 1684
- Venere Armata 52 (1670s/c. 1686) - Discarded 1702?
- Ercole Vittorioso 50 (c. 1683) - Discarded 1719?
- San Marco Grande 60 (c. 1683) - Blew up 1690
- San Antonio di Padova c. 50 (c. 1683) - Discarded 1715?
- Pace ed Abbondanza 50 (c. 1683) - Discarded 1714?
- San Giovanni Battista Piccolo c. 50 (c. 1683) - Sank 1695
- San Vittorio 62 (bought 1684) - Discarded 1706?
- San Giovanni Battista Grande 60 (bought 1684) - Discarded 1706?
- San Andrea 60 (c. 1685) - Discarded 1721?
- San Nicolo 54 (c. 1685) - Discarded 1717?
- San Iseppo/San Giuseppe 44 (c. 1685) - Captured by Turkey (or Algeria?) 1690
- Redentore del Mundo 70 (c. 1686) - Discarded 1709?
- San Domenico 60 (c. 1686) - Discarded 1709?
- Vittoria 50 (c. 1687) - Discarded 1717?
- Sacra Lega 60 (c. 1687) - Discarded 1720?
- Valor Coronato 54 (c. 1687) - Discarded 1719?
- Monton d'Oro (c. 1688) - Aground and burnt, 1691
- Abbondanza e Richezza (c. 1688) - Abandoned 1695
- Nettuno 50 (c. 1690) - Discarded 1722?
- Leon Coronato (c. 1691) - Blew up 1695
- San Lorenzo Giustinian 80 (c. 1691) - Discarded 1712?
- Stella Maris (c. 1693) - Blew up 1695
- Rosa 60 (c. 1693) - Discarded 1721?
- Fenice 56 (c. 1695) - Discarded 1720?
- Fede Guerriera 56 (c. 1695) - Discarded 1720?
- Iride 66 (c. 1696) - Discarded 1718?
- San Sebastiano 68 (c. 1696) - Blew up 1697
- Aurora 80 (c. 1696) - Discarded 1709?
- Tigre 66 (c. 1696) - Discarded 1705?
- Giove 64 (c. 1697) - Discarded 1717?
- Sole d'Oro 70 (c. 1697) - Discarded 1705?
- Rizzo d'Oro 68 (c. 1697) - Discarded 1711?
- Amazzone Guerriera 62 (c. 1697) - Discarded 1712?
- Aquila Volante/Aquilla Valiera c. 70 (c. 1698) - Discarded 1720?
- Grand Alessandro c. 70 (c. 1709) - Discarded 1730?
- Corona c. 70 (c. 1711) - Discarded 1728?
- Croce Rossa c. 70 (c. 1698) - Wrecked 1715
- Terror c. 70 (c. 1715) - Discarded 1748?
- Regina del Mar c. 70 (c. 1715) - Discarded 1715?
- Costanza 76 (c. 1714) - Discarded 1745?
- Aquileta c. 60
- San Francesco c. 60 (c. 1714) - Discarded 1748?
- San Pietro Apostolo c. 60 (bought 1715) - Discarded 1733?
- Scudo della Fede c. 50 (c. 1715) - Discarded 1716
- Santissimo Crocefisso c. 50
- Madonna dell' Arsenal c. 70 (c. 1716) - Discarded 1740?
- Venezia Trionfante c. 50 (c. 1715/25) - Discarded 1745?
- Leone Trionfante c. 80 (c. 1716) - Discarded 1740?
- Gloria Veneta 70-80 (c. 1716) - Discarded 1738?
- San Pio V 70-80 (c. 1716) - Discarded 1740?
- San Gaetano 70-80 (c. 1716) - Discarded 1733?
- Fortuna (Fortezza?) Guerriera (c. 1717) - Discarded 1740?
- San Pietro Alcantara (c. 1718) - Discarded 1733?
- San Andrea (c. 1718/24) - Discarded 1747?
- Idra (c. 1717) - Discarded 1737?
- San Zaccaria (c. 1717) - Discarded 1734?
- San Spiridon (c. 1717) - Discarded 1736?
- Falcon (c. 1717) - Discarded 1738?
- Ercole 74 (c. 1761) - Discarded 1779?
- Corriera 74 - Wrecked 1771
- Concordia 66 (1772) - Discarded 1793?
- Diligenza (c. 1774) - Discarded 1797?
- Forza 70 (c. 1774) - Wrecked 1785
- Sirena c. 60 (c. 1778) - Discarded 1794?
- Galatea (c. 1779) - Discarded 1793?
- Fama 66 (c. 1784) - Captured by France 1797 and renamed Dubois, BU c. 1801
- Vittoria 70 (c. 1784) - Captured by France 1797 and scuttled
- Eolo 70 (c. 1785) - Captured by France 1797 and renamed Robert
- San Giorgio 70 (c. 1785) - Captured by France 1797 and renamed Sandos
- Minerva - Wrecked c. 1792
- Vulcano 70 (c. 1792) - Captured by France 1797 and renamed Causse, captured by Britain 1801
- Medea 70 (c. 1793) - Captured by France 1797 and renamed Frontin
- Gloria (Veneta) 66 (c. 1794) - Captured by France 1797 and renamed Banel
- Laharpe 74 (c. 1797) - Captured by France 1797, captured by Austria 1799
- Stengal 64 (c. 1797) - Captured by France 1797, captured by Austria 1799
- Beyrand 64 (c. 1797) - Captured by France 1797, captured by Austria 1799
- (10 ships of the Line) - Captured by France 1797
