= Kronprinsessegade 32 =

Listed building in Copenhagen

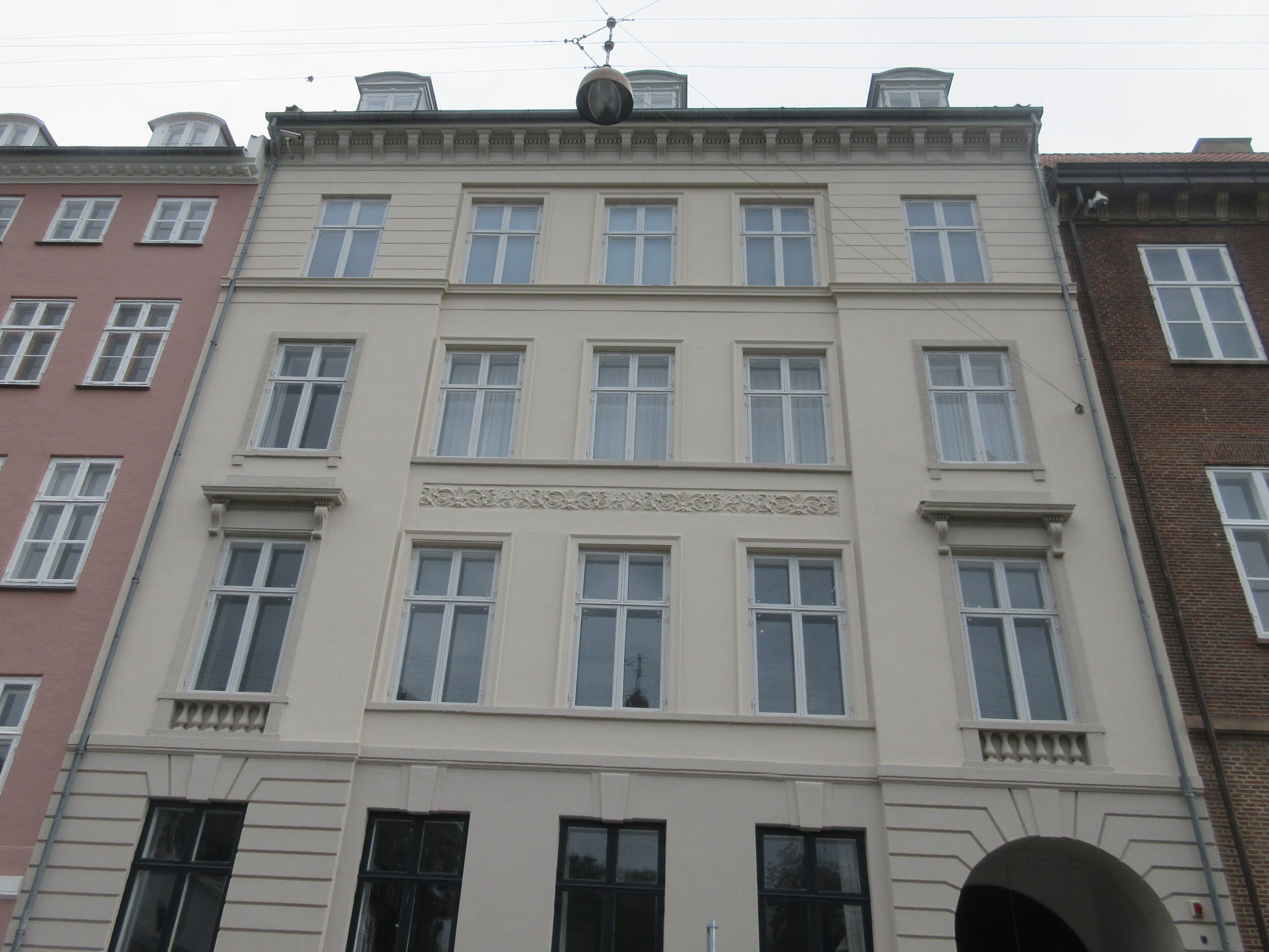
- Interactive map of the Kronprinsessegade 32 area

General information
- Architectural style: J. D. Backhausen
- Location: Copenhagen, Denmark
- Coordinates: 55°41′3.88″N 12°34′56.6″E
- Completed: 1807-08

Kronprinsessegade 32 is a Neoclassical apartment building overlooking Rosenborg Castle Garden in central Copenhagen, Denmark. The property was acquired by the ship captain Peter Nielsen Holbech a few years after its completion in 1805. His granddaughter Ursula Dahlerup has provided a detailed account of the Holbech family's life in the building in her memoirs Fra Gammel Tid. Her father, portrait painter Niels Peter Holbech, who eventually inherited the property, could not handle his sudden prosperity and ended up squandering the family fortune. Other notable former residents include actor Christen Niemann Rosenkilde (1786–1861), author Peder Hjort, military officer Oluf Krabbe, Copenhagen Zoo-founder Niels Kjærbølling and actors N.P. Nielsen and Anna Mielsen (1803–1856) The building was listed in the Danish registry of protected buildings and places in 1918. In 1989, it was acquired by Davids Samling and used for an extension of the museum.

== History ==
=== Construction ===
The site was initially referred to as Parcel 17 when Kronprinsessegade was created in 1800. The present building on the site was constructed in 1804–05 by master mason Johan Didrich Backhausen (1771–1850).

=== Holbech family ===
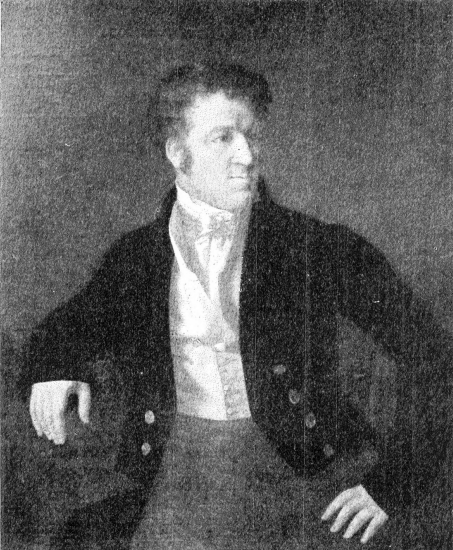
Peter Nielsen Holbech

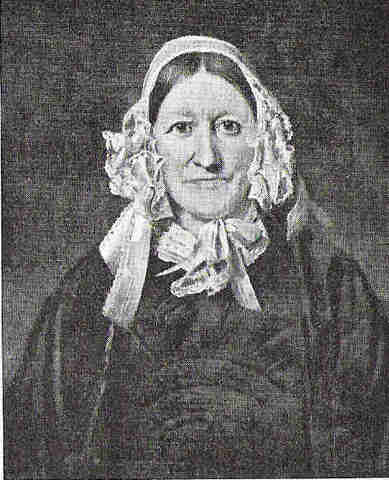
Marie Holbech (née Thaysen)

The property was a few years after its completion acquired by ship captain Peter Nielsen Holbech (1772–1847). Back in 1800, Holbech had married Marie Thaysen, daughter of a wealthy Flensburg merchant. Prior to their wedding, she had spent a year learning seamanship from her uncle. This enabled her to take very active part in the sailing of her husband's ship Maria Constantia.

Their son Niels Peter Holbech was born on board the ship, en route from Calcutta to Copenhagen. During the Gunboat War, the ship was seized by the British and they spent two years as prisoners of war. It was fairly shortly after their return to Copenhagen that Holbech acquired the property in Kronprinsessegade.

Maria Holbech moved from home when she discovered that her husband was cheating on her with their nanny Ane Eichløw and failed to discontinue the affair. She subsequently lived in an apartment in Rosenborggade. Peter Nielsen Holbech and Ane Eichløw entered into a de facto partnership.

Holbech's tenants included the actor Christen Niemann Rosenkilde (1817), author Peder Hjort (1822) and the military officer Oluf Krabbe ( 1831-).

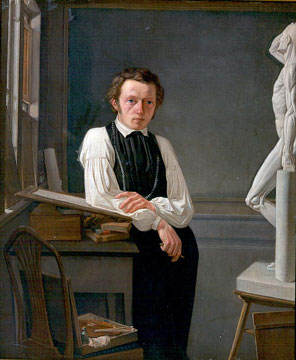
Niels Peter Holbech

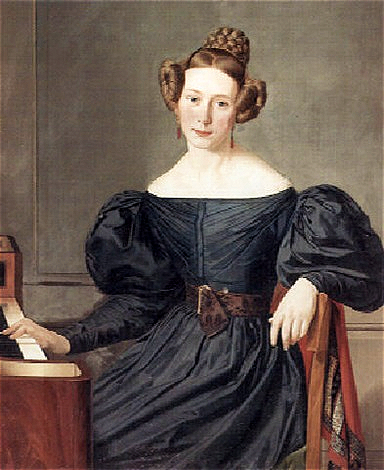
Caroline Louise Amalie Gamborg

At the age of fifteen, Holbech's son entered the Royal Danish Academy of Fine Arts. He later spent seven years in Italy before returning to his father's property in Kronprinsessegade. Peter Nielsen Holbeck, Anna Eichløv and Niels Peter Holbech lived together in the third-floor apartment at the time of the 1834 census.

In 1836, Niels Peter Holbech married Caroline Louise Amalie Gamborg (1809–1873). She was the daughter of Anders Gamborg, who was a professor of philosophy at Copenhagen University. They were the parents of two daughters. One of them was the later businesswoman and inventor Ursula Dahlerup. She has described the Holbech family's life in the building in her memoirs Fra Gammel Tid, Her parents chose to live on the ground-floor of the German Reformed Church's rectory in Gothersgade instead of her grandfather's property in Kronprinsessegade as a result of the mother's strong dislike of her husband's father and stepmother.

Peter Nielsen Holbech's property in Kronprinsessegade was home to 38 residents in six households at the 1840 census. Peter Nielssen Holbech and Anna Constantia Eigløv resided on the second floor of the cross wing with one maid. Christian Hjette, a lieutenant and teacher at the Army Cadet Academy, resided on the third floor of the cross wing with his wife Sophie Friedel and one maid. Conrad Robertus Meinung (1805–1873), a first lieutenant in the 2nd Life Regiment on Foot, resided on the ground floor with his wife Caroline Frederikke Mourier (1821–1840), his mother-in-law Georgine Cornilie Mourier, one male servant and one maid. Ove Emerik Høgh Guldberg (1798–1843; son of Frederik Høegh-Guldberg). a Supreme Court attorney, resided on the first floor with his wife Johanne Frederikke Ter Birch (1804–1857, daughter of Thomas Ter Borch), their 12-year-old daughter and one maid. Gotfred Christian Buchvald, a royal clerk at the Lottery, resided on the third floor with his wife Sophie Buchvald, his three sisters, a maid and a lodger. Hans Christian Magnus Gottschalch, a surgeon in the King's Regiment, resided on the second floor with his wife Christiane Lovise Olrik, their four children (aged two to eight) and two maids. Christen Benssen, a barkeeper. resided in the basement with his wife Ane Kristine Nielsdatter, their two children (aged one and three), a maid and three lodgers. Frederich Grandjean, a man with a royal pension, resided on the ground floor of the rear wing with his wife Magdelene Sophie Nyborg.

Holbech's property was home to nine households at the 1845 census. Peter Holbech and Anna Constantia Eigløv resided in the ground-floor apartment with one maid. Sophie Philipsen, a widow, resided on the first floor with her son Georg Philipsen, her daughter Henriette Philipsen, her daughter's one-year-old daughter Zerine Holm, a wet nurse and two maids. Basilius Fortunatoff, pastor of the Russian diplomatic mission, resided on the second floor with his wife Nathalie Fortunatoff, their five children (aged one to six) and three maids Gotfred Christian Buchvald, a royal clerk at the lottery, resided on the third floor with his sisters Petrine and Frederikke Buchvald and merchant Hans Peter Malling. Peter Petersen, a servant (lejetjener), resided in the basement with his wife Marie Mortensen Petersen. Ane Cecilie Flindt, a widow with a pension, resided on the ground floor of the rear wing with her daughter Waleria Johanne Flindt (teacher at the Det Qvindelige Velgiørende Selskabs Skole) and one maid. Carl August Borgen, a bookkeeper, resided on the second floor of the rear wing with his wife Julie Marie Borgen and one maid. Frederike Sophie Bache, a widow, resided on the third floor of the rear wing with her daughter Ane Marie Bache, one maid and the lodgers Ludvig Nicolaus Krog (theology student) and Thomas Wilhelm Fritz (philosophy student).

Peter Nielsen Holbech died in 1847. Miels Peter Holbech expected to be the new owner of the property but it turned out that his father had bequeathed everything to Ane Eichløw. She offered him half of the inheritance but, instigated by his wife' cousin, a lawyer, he instead tried to have the gift deed overturned in the courts. This was in vain and he ended up having to pay 1,500 reigsdaler in court costs. Ane Eichløw subsequently sold the property in Kronprinsessegade to him on very favourable terms, but retained the right to the ground-floor apartment for life.

Niels Peter Holbech and Caroline Louise Holbech (née Gamborg) resided in the third-floor apartment at the time of the 1850 census. They lived there with their two daughters (aged nine and 13), one maid and the lodgers Julius Skrike and Hans Christian Helmich.

Founder of Copenhagen Zoo Niels Kjærbølling (1806–1871) resided in one of the apartments from 1851 to 1854. The actors N. P. Nielsen (1795–1860) and Anna Mielsen (1803–1856) resided in another apartment from 1851 to 1856.

The German painter Ditlev Martens, whom Holbech knew from Rome, was also a resident of the building. Golbech's youngest daughter was very fond of him as described in her memoirs. He endorsed her to become an artist but her dominant mother was strongly opposed to this. She wanted both the daughters to remains in their parents' home rather than pursuing lives of their own.

Two young students—Christian Wolff-Sneedorff from Engelsholm and Peter Collet from Lundbygård—rented the first-floor apartment in 1848. Utsula Holbech fell in love with Collet, with whom she shared a passion for music, but again her mother did not approve of the liaison and managed to obstruct it.

Ursula Holbech was instead married to Hans Joost Dahlerup in 1868. Her husband was the son of Austrian admiral Hans Birch Dahlerup. The young couple was installed in a first-floor apartment in the side wing of her father's property in Kronprinsessegad4e.

Ane Eichløw died shortly after the wedding. Prior to her death, she wrote a will that bequeathed the remains of the Holbech family fortune to Ursula Dahlerup. Then Yrsula Dahlerup's mother and sister persuaded her to ask Ane Eichløw to bequeath everything to her father instead. She reluctantly accepted this, pointing out that the old captain had chosen to leave everything to her because he doubted that his son would be able to handle the money. The parents moved down to the ground floor apartment after undertaking an extravagant renovation on it. Ursula Dahlerup and her husband took over the third-floor apartment.

Neither the father nor the mother could handle their newfound wealth. The mother acquired expensive habits and gave expensive gifts to her family. The father adopted an increasingly extravagant lifestyle with his artist friends and young models. The mother died in 1873. Hans Joost Dahlerup died in December 1876.

As Holbech lived still more erratically, his neighbor Julius Blom was eventually asked to administer his estate, He persuaded the family to sell the property in Kronprinsessegade. Hornbech settled in Sweden, painting religious painting and studying the bible.

=== J. Larsen & Søn ===
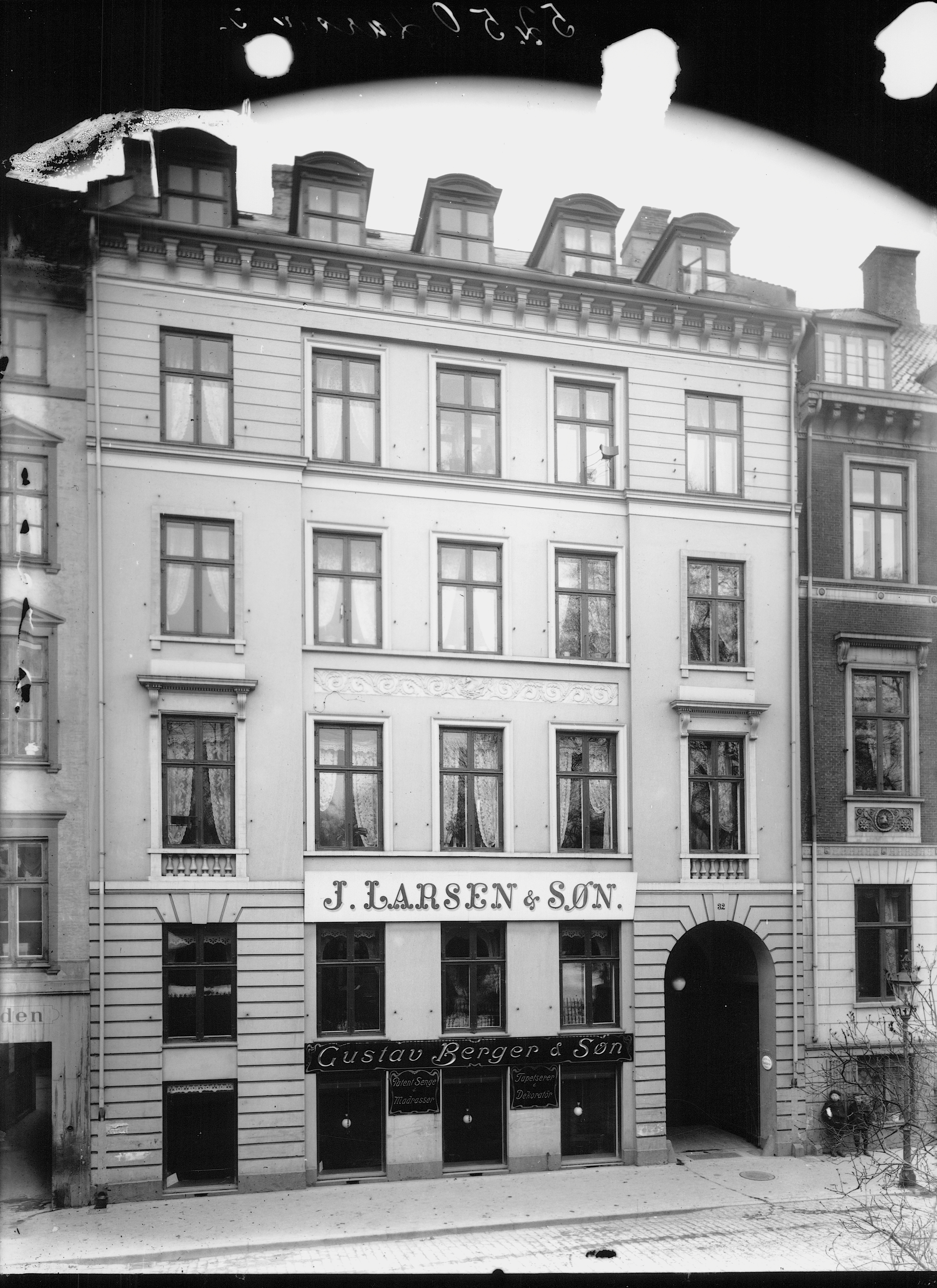
Kronprinsessegade 32 in 1906

The next owner of the property was the piano manufacturer J. Larsen & Søn. The company was founded by Jørgen Larsen (1822–1899) in 1855. Ownership of the company was transferred to his sons Otto Larsen (1861-)andg Charles Larsen (1866-) in 1907. The company was based at Kronprinsessegade 32 until at least 1910.

The businessman (grosserer) Johann Lauritz Madsen and his wife Augusta Georgine Madsen resided in one of the apartments at the 1907 census. Carl Zoyluer, another businessman (hrosserer), resided in another apartment with his wife Jutta Zoylue, their two children (aged two and four) and two maids.

=== Later history ===
L. Nielsen's Eftf., a glazier's business founded in 1877, was based in the building in 1950. It was owned by the founder's son-in-law Marie Øgaard Nielsen and grandson Rikard Øgaard Nielsen (1897-) at that time.

== Architecture ==
Kronprinsessegade 32 is a four-bay-wide building constructed with four storeys over a walk-out basement. The two outer bays form slightly projecting lateral risalits. The plastered facade is finished with shadow joints on the ground floor and the exposed part of the basement as well as around the outer windows on third floor. The outer windows on the first floor are accented with balustrades and hood moulds supported by corbels. The three central bays are visually brought together by sill courses on the three upper floors and a recessed frieze between the three central windows of the first and second floor. The cornice is also supported by corbels. A gate topped by a fanlight is located in a deep niche in the bay furthest to the right (south). An outwardly curved staircase with stained glass windows on the rear side of the building dates from some time between 1870 and 1884.

A long side wing extends from the rear side of the building along the north side of a narrow courtyard. It is attached to a rear wing at the far end of the courtyard.

== Today ==
In 1989, Davids Samling bought the building. It has subsequently been used for an extension of the museum.
