= Naval operations of the First Italian War of Independence =

1848–1849 conflict in Europe

- Part of the Revolutions of 1848 and Unification of Italy
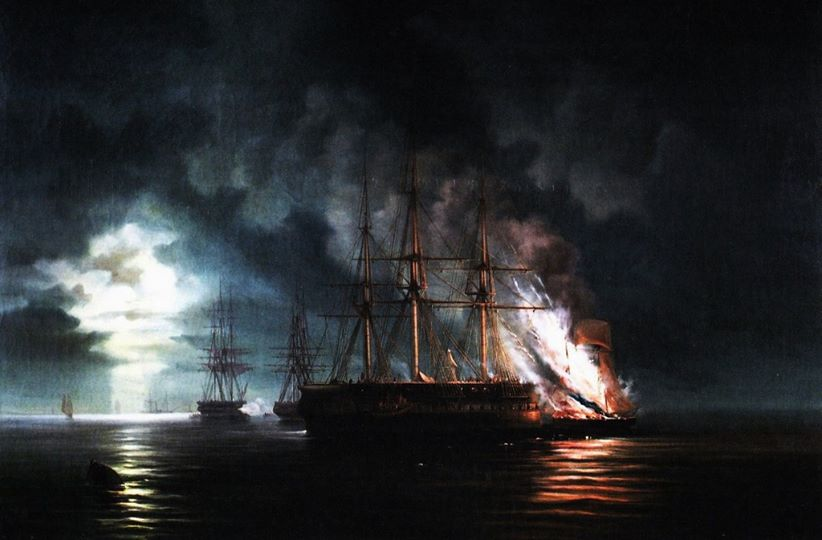
- The Austrian frigate Venere attacked by a Venetian fireship
Date	April 1848 – August 1849
Location	Adriatic Sea
Result	Austrian victory
Territorial changes	No change as a result of naval activity

Belligerents
Republic of San Marco; Supported by: Kingdom of Sardinia; Kingdom of the Two Sicilies; Papal States-Roman Republic	Austrian Empire

Commanders and leaders
Giuseppe Albini (Sardinia); Raffaele de Cosa (Sicily); Alessandro Cialdi (Papal States/ Roman Republic)	(Austrian Empire) Ferenc Gyulay (Austrian Empire) Ludwig von Kudriaffsky (Austrian Empire) Hans Birch Dahlerup

The naval operations of the First Italian War of Independence took place between April 1848 and August 1849 and involved the Austrian Empire and the forces opposing it from the Republic of San Marco, the Kingdom of Sardinia, the Kingdom of the Two Sicilies, the Papal States and the Roman Republic. The conflict took place in the northern Adriatic Sea, mostly off the ports of Venice and Trieste. No major naval battles were fought, and much of the war was an ongoing stalemate between fleets lacking the superiority over each other to strike a decisive blow against the enemy.

== Naval forces ==
=== The Austrian navy ===
When the war broke out, Venice was one of the Austrian navy’s most important ports and the revolution which began there nearly led to its complete disintegration. The Austrian commander of the Venetian Naval Yard, Giovanni Marinovich, was beaten to death by his own workers. Vice-Admiral Anton von Martini, Commander-in-Chief of the Navy, attempted to put an end to the rebellion but was captured and held prisoner. By the end of March, the Austrian troops in Venice were forced out of the city altogether and the navy appeared to be collapsing as many of its sailors and officers were of Italian descent. Fearing mutinies, Austrian officers ultimately relieved these men of their duty and permitted them to return home. While this action left the Navy drastically undermanned, it prevented any wider disintegration like that suffered by the Imperial Austrian Army in Italy.

The loss of so many sailors and officers meant that the remaining Austrian ships which did not fall into rebel hands in Venice were lacking many crew members - of roughly 5,000 men before the revolution, only 72 officers and 665 sailors remained. There was also the loss of Venice's naval dockyards, warehouses and arsenal, as well as four corvettes, three brigs, one steamer and several smaller vessels to the Venetian rebels. Austria managed to retain all three of its frigates, two corvettes, six brigs and one paddle-steamer.

The Austrian Navy had to reorganize itself under the temporary command of General Count Ferenc Gyulay, who recalled every Austrian ship in the Mediterranean, the Adriatic, and in the Levant. Due to the proximity of Trieste to the parts of Italy revolting against Austrian rule, the small port of Pola was chosen as the navy’s new base. This marked the first time the city had been used as an Austrian naval base, and it continued to serve as such until the end of World War I. In late April 1848, the reconstituted Austrian fleet prepared to begin hostilities with a blockade of Venice in order to assist Austria's army against the Italian nationalists who had seized the city.

The ships Austria could deploy by late April 1848 were the frigates Bellona and Guerriera, the brigs Oreste and Montecuccoli, and the steam corvette Vulcano. Together with four steamships later requisitioned from Österreichischer Lloyd, the Maria Dorotea, the Custoza, the Curtatone and the Trieste, they were placed under the command of Ludwig von Kudriaffsky.

=== Italian navies ===
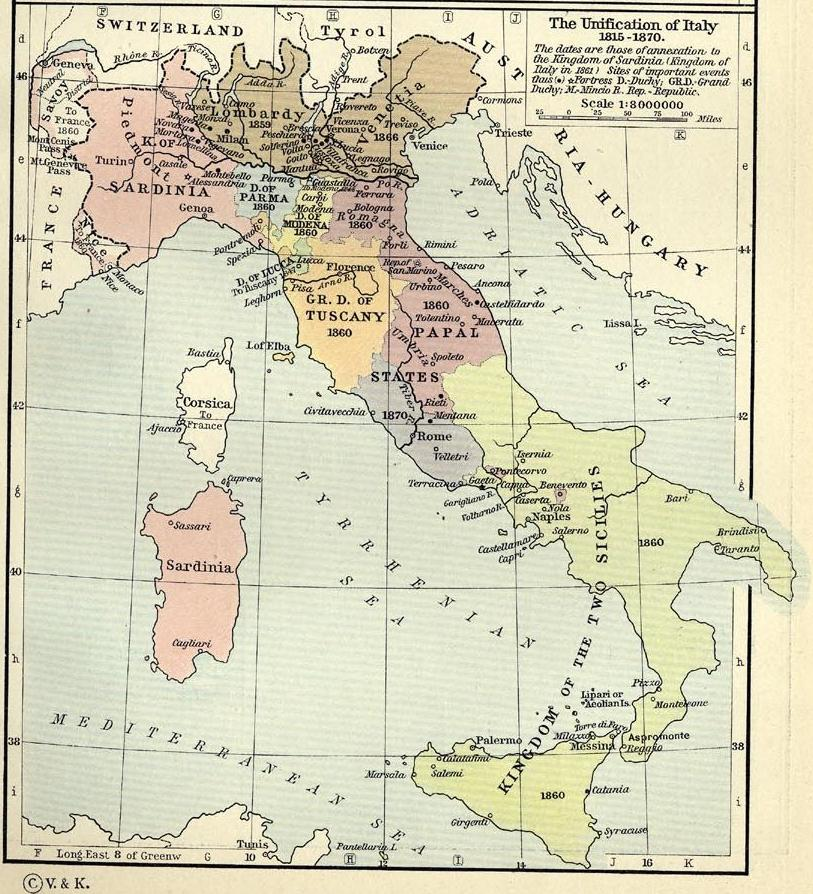
Italy 1815–1870

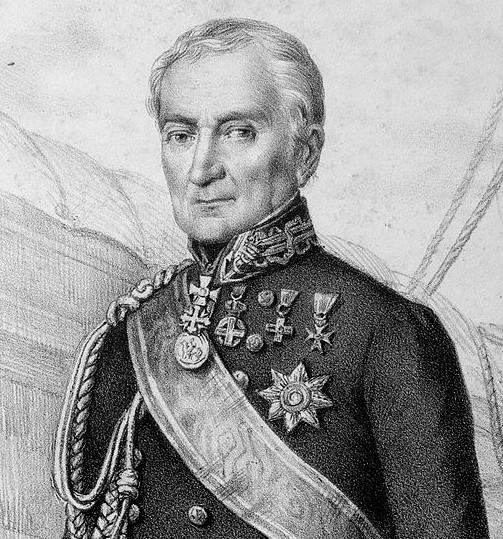
Giuseppe Albini

The Italian tricolour, flown for the first time by the Sardinian squadron

At the start of hostilities there was no unified Italian navy. The Republic of San Marco had the ships seized from the Austrians and left behind in Venice when they departed. Those that were seaworthy were two corvettes, one with 20 guns and the other with 24; two brigs, a schooner and 80 smaller craft for navigating on the lagoon. In the arsenal a 44-gun frigate and a 16-gun brig were under construction, and a number of other craft were being repaired.

The Republic of San Marco began organising its forces under Navy Minister Antonio Paulucci and rear admiral Leone Graziani. The serviceable ships were renamed so that the two 24-gun corvettes were known as the Veloce and the Lombardia; the 20-gun corvettes Independenza and Civica; the brigs Crociato, San Marco and Pilade, the schooner Fenice and the steam corvette Pio IX, and all were placed under the command of rear admiral Giorgio Bua.

The Royal Sicilian Navy sent a squadron to support Venice under the command of Raffaele de Cosa, consisting of the frigates Regina, Regina Isabella, the brigs Principe Carlo, and the steam frigates Roberto, Ruggiero, Giuscardo, Sannita and Carlo III. They sailed from Naples on 27 April to join forces with the Venetian fleet. The Sicilian squadron reached Ancona on 5 May and Venice on 16 May. It then cruised between the mouths of the Tagliamento and the Piave, waiting for the arrival of the Sardinian squadron.

The first division of the Royal Sardinian Navy, commanded by Giuseppe Albini, sailed from Genoa on 27 April, heading for Venice. It consisted of the 50-gun frigate San Michele, the 44-gun frigates Des Geneys and Beroldo, the brig Daino and the schooner Staffetta. It was followed a few days later by a second division, comprising the corvettes Aquila and Aurora and the steam corvettes Tripoli and Malfatano. The two divisions met up in Ancona on 17 May and on 22 May came into the view of the Sicilian squadron stationed in the gulf of Venice. This Sardinian squadron was the first naval force to fly the Italian tricolour, with the arms of Savoy at its centre.

The Papal Navy was very small and played only a minor role in the war. In 1848 it consisted of the disarmed brig San Pietro and a small gunboat based at Civitavecchia, four elderly coastguard ships and four small British-built steamers, mainly used for towing commercial shipping on the Tiber. Only one of these steamers, the Roma, took part in the first phases of the war. It was sent to the Adriatic under the command of Alessandro Cialdi initially in support of the papal army operating on the border of papal Emilia and the Venetian territories of Austria. Later it joined the combined Italian fleet off Trieste until pope Pius IX withdrew from the war on 29 April 1848, when it retired to Ancona. In November 1848 the pope was expelled from Rome and Ancona adhered to the short-lived Roman Republic (1849–1850) that replaced his rule in the Papal States. In 1849 when Austria invaded the Papal States, the Roma took part in the defence of the city.

The navy of the Grand Duchy of Tuscany was very small and did not take part in hostilities.

=== Other navies ===
The French navy played a role in deterring an Austrian attack on Venice in 1848, and landed a military force at Civitavecchia in 1849 to restore Pope Pius IX to Rome. There was no consequent naval action as the landing was unopposed by the Roman Republic.

At various points throughout war, the British navy had ships positioned off many Italian ports such as Naples, Livorno and Genoa, though none of them were involved in combat. During the blockade of Trieste, the British had a number of warships on station to protect British residents and their property and to deter any possible Sardinian attack in the city.

The Spanish navy played a minor role in the war, when seven ships transported troops from Spain to Gaeta to support Pope Pius IX in his campaign to regain control of the Papal States. The Spanish fleet was not involved in any combat action.

In June 1848 the Sardinian government authorised the establishment of a depot at La Spezia for the US Navy, which however took no part in the war.

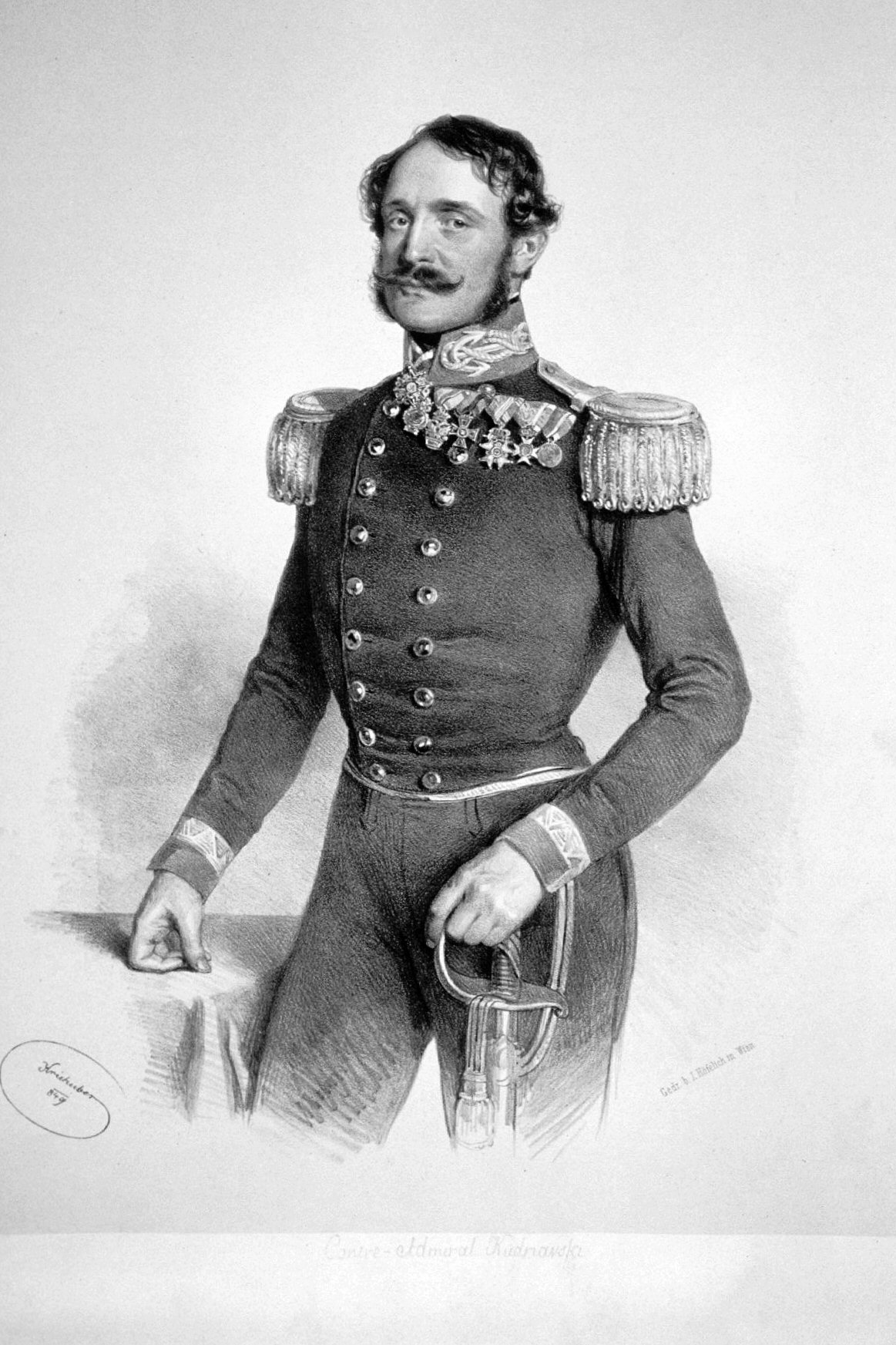
Ludwig Kudriaffsky

== First blockade of Venice (April–May 1848) ==
Hostilities at sea began in April 1848 with the Austrians announcing the blockade of Venice. Until reinforcements arrived from Sicily and Sardinia, the Venetians were not strong enough on their own to drive them off. Despite this, the Austrians were cautious, seizing a few merchant ships and, on 3 May, threatening Chioggia, but finding it well defended, they withdrew.

The balance of power changed with the arrival of the Sardinian fleet on 22 May, and Kudriaffsky decided to withdraw his squadron to Trieste. The Sicilians had enough steam frigates to be able to attack and overpower the Austrians, but the wind suddenly dropped, and instead of ordering the steamships to attack while they had the advantage, Albini requested them instead to tow the Sardinian sailing ships towards the Austrians, keeping his forces together. This time-consuming manoeuvre allowed Kudriaffsky to call the Lloyd steamers out from Trieste to do likewise with his own sailing ships, so that they all reached port safely without any threat from the Italians as night fell.

== Blockade of Trieste (May–September 1848) ==
On 23 May the combined Italian fleet dropped anchor off Trieste and issued a demand that the Austrians return the warships to Venice that they had removed from the city back in March. There was no action in the following days while the consuls of various states of the German Confederation based in the city let the Italian commanders know that any acts of war against the port of Trieste would be considered acts of war against their respective countries.

In addition the British government applied consistent diplomatic pressure on Sardinia not to attack Trieste, where there was a significant amount of British property. a number of British warships - the Terrible, Antelope, Harlequin and Spartan were also anchored off Trieste to reinforce the British government’s wishes. The French Republic also sent a frigate, the Asmodée, under the command of Louis-Alphonse de Ricaudy, which reached Venice in early May and took up station off Trieste after the combined Italian fleet anchored there. As a result not even the provocative cannon fire on 6 June from an Austrian frigate and the ricochet that hit the San Michele were enough to convince the Italians to open fire.

The Sicilian fleet, dispatched to the aid of Venice only reluctantly by King Ferdinand, had been ordered from the outset not to fire on the Austrians. On 27 May, having suppressed the liberal movement in his territories, King Ferdinand commanded his squadron to return to Naples which it did, without ever firing a shot. Their departure deprived the combined Italian fleet of all its steamships and left them at rough parity with the Austrian fleet in terms of ship numbers and fighting power.

Despite being weakened by the departure of the Sicilians, Albini decided to announce a formal blockade of Trieste on 8 June. This was to apply to any shipping flying the Austrian flag from 15 June, and to all shipping from 15 July. The following weeks saw sporadic minor action as the Austrians captured an Italian ship and there was an exchange of fire off Piran, but effectively a stalemate prevailed. Eventually, on 7 September Albini formally announced that he was abandoning the blockade.

== Second blockade of Venice (September 1848–March 1849) ==
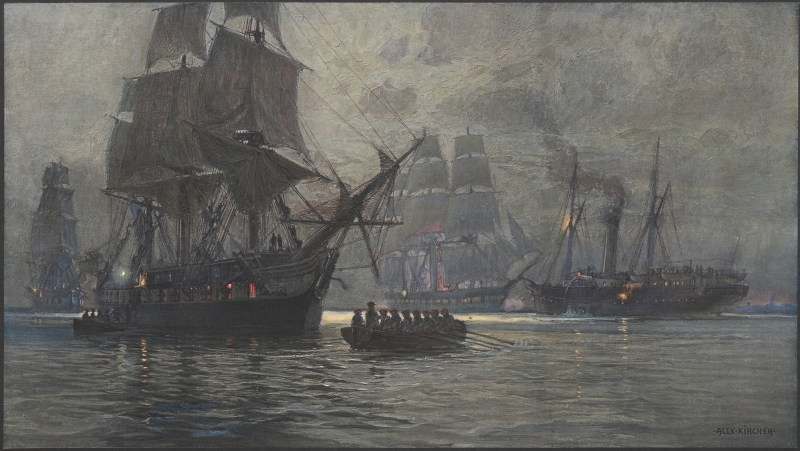
Austrian blockade of Venice

After the resounding defeat of his army at the battle of Custoza, king Charles Albert of Sardinia decided to sue for peace. In the resulting armistice of Salasco, Sardinia agreed to abandon Venice. After some delay, the Sardinian squadron therefore sailed away, leaving the Venetians to defend themselves. The Austrian squadron, now led by Hans Birch Dahlerup, sailed back to Venice and blockaded it once again. Dahlerup had under his command three frigates, the Bellona, Guerriera and Venere, the corvette Adria, the brigs Oreste, Montecuccoli and Pola, and the steam corvette Vulcano.

Previously relying on the Sardinian fleet to protect them, the Venetians had not maintained their own warships in readiness to defend their city. They could only bring into service two 24-gun and two 20-gun corvettes, three brigs, a schooner and a steam corvette. Dahlerup did not attempt to attack the city and the Venetians did not attempt to break out, although the Pio IX three times engaged the Austrian paddle-steamer Vulcano and a fireship was sent out against the Austrian frigate Venere, damaging it so badly it had to be towed away to Trieste.

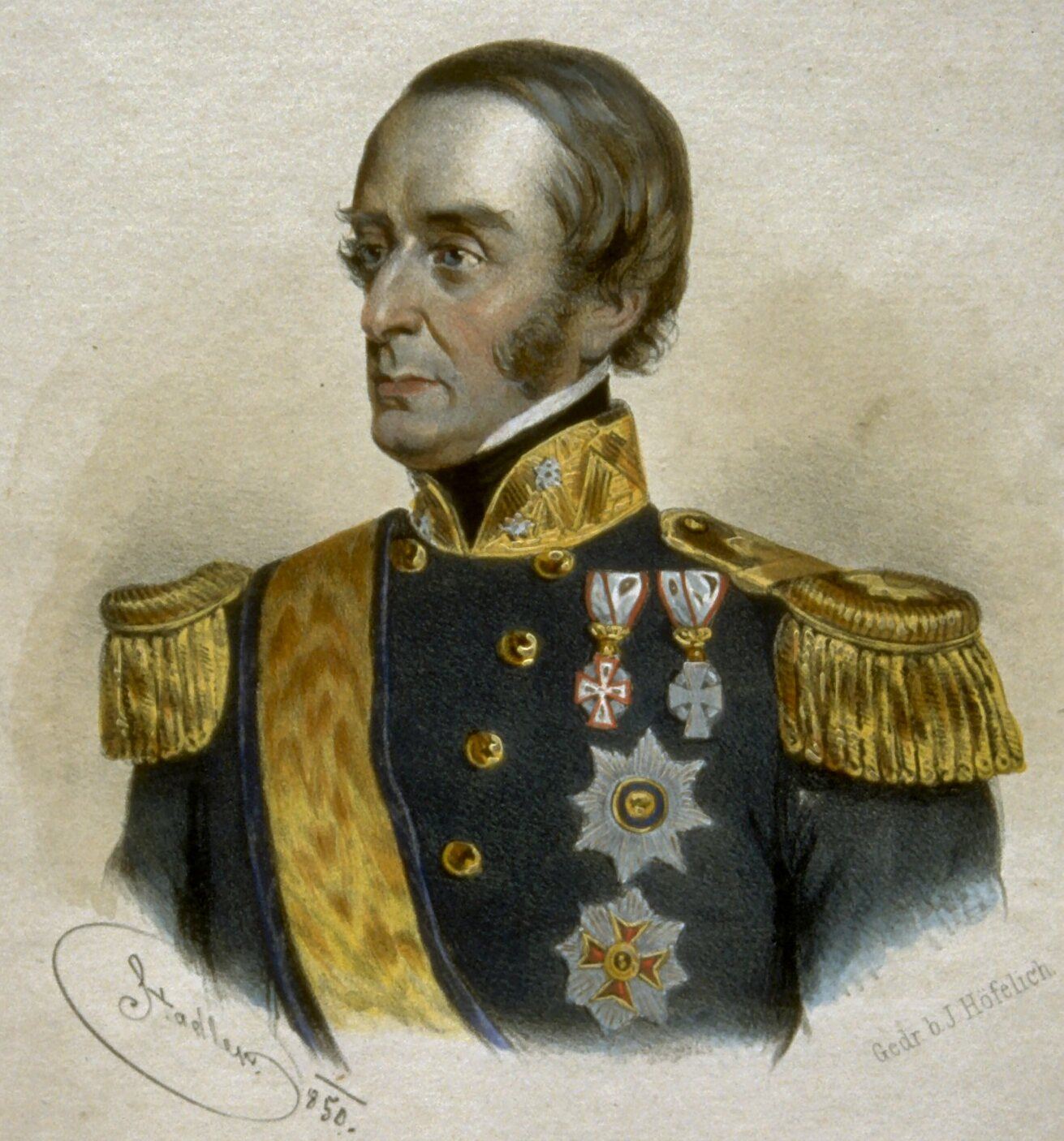
Hans Birch Dahlerup

While Venice continued to defend itself, Austria and Sardinia argued over their armistice. The Sardinians claimed that the Austrians were breaking its terms by unjustifiably holding artillery units left behind in the retreat from Peschiera del Garda; the Austrians claimed the Sardinians were breaching their agreement by not withdrawing their fleet from the Adriatic - Albini had simply withdrawn to Ancona and could quickly return to Venice. King Charles Albert warned that if Austria tried to enforce the blockade on Venice, or if it tried to take the city by military force, Sardinia would resume hostilities and send its fleet back from Ancona to defend the city. Indeed, on 23 October Sardinia ordered Albini to return to Venice, and Dahlerup withdrew his ships to Trieste and Pola. Albini kept his squadron off Venice until the spring of 1849, when he returned with his frigates and other larger ships to Ancona.

France, while working with the United Kingdom to secure a final peace between Austria and Sardinia, strengthened her naval force in the Adriatic and made clear that her ships too would come to the aid of Venice if hostilities were resumed. On 7 September the Asmodée, which had previously been off Trieste, took up a position outside the lagoon of Venice. Soon after, on 25 September two more French warships arrived in Trieste, the 80-gun Jupiter and the frigate Psyché. They were joined on 1 November by the steamers Solon and Brasier, in January 1849 by the paddle corvette Pluton and in early March 1849 by the steamer Panama. In the light of this presence, while not raising the siege of Venice, the Austrians did very little to enforce the blockade they had proclaimed.

Eventually, on 20 March 1849, the Sardinians denounced the armistice and resumed fighting. Just three days later the Austrians inflicted a final defeat on them at the battle of Novara, ending the war before Albini had time to sail his squadron back to Venice to engage Dahlerup. After this he withdrew his ships from the Adriatic altogether and sailed back to Genoa.

== Blockade of Ancona (June–July 1849) ==
With Sardinia out of the war and Venice isolated, the only other Italian state fighting the Austrians and their allies was the short-lived Roman Republic, formed after Pius IX fled Rome. The pope then appealed to France, Spain and Austria to restore him. Responding to his call, General General von Wimpffen led an Austrian army across the River Po and laid siege to Ancona on 23 May 1849. At the same time Dahlerup arrived with a naval squadron from Venice.

Obliged to divide his forces between Venice and Ancona, Dahlerup decided to leave his shallow-draught vessels off Venice, where they were better suited to the local shipping conditions, and send his three frigates, with their greater firepower, to Ancona. The steamships could move between the two theatres as circumstances required. His Ancona squadron thus consisted of the frigates Bellona, Curtatone and Custoza along with two Lloyd steamers, the Maria Dorotea and Arciduchessa Sofia and the brig Triest. The fortifications of Ancona had powerful guns, so the Austrians decided not to force an early assault on the city in order to keep their frigates clear of the defending artillery. On 25 May the Curtatone bombarded the port, the castle and a number of defending artillery positions, before sustaining some damage and being obliged to withdraw. On 7 June Dahlerup formally imposed a maritime blockade on the city.

To defend against Dahlerup’s squadron, the Roman Republic had only the Roma, sent back from Trieste the previous year, and two coastguard ships, the Annibale and the Cesare. The Roma was commanded by Raffaele Castagnola. On 5 June, taking advantage of the absence of the Curtatone, the Roma, avoiding fire from the Austrian warships, left port and attacked General Wimpffen’s artillery, forcing it to move inland away from the beach, and preventing Dahlerup from linking up directly with the besieging Austrian army. On 14 June the Roma made another sortie to escort into the port some small boats bringing into the city desperately-needed supplies. A few days later however the Austrians began an intense bombardment by land and by sea that lasted for two whole days. The city surrendered on 19 June, allowing Dahlerup to send all his ships there back to Venice.

== Third blockade of Venice (April–August 1849) ==
In addition to being cut off by sea, Venice was now also besieged from the landward side by Austrian armies first under General von Haynau and later by General Von Thun. On 31 March the government in Vienna gave notice of its intention to reinstate the blockade of Venice from 4 April. This time there were no objections from Britain or France, which both advised Venice to make peace on any terms.

By the end of the month the Bellona, Venere and Guerriera had taken up their positions off Malamocco while the Adria, Montecuccoli and Pola were stationed at Chioggia: the Oreste and Elizabetta covered the waters between Chioggia and the mouths of the Po; while the Sfinge cruised between the Venice Lido and Porto Falconera. The Austrians tried to demand that the British and French withdrew their warships from the vicinity of Venice, but they resisted this by diplomatic means, and stayed. After the Austrian fleet was reduced in May in order to send ships to blockade Ancona, the Venetians tried to send out fourteen Trabaccolos to Ravenna to pick up much-needed supplies. These craft were escorted by the corvette Pio IX but, attacked by the Austrian paddle-steamer Custoza at Malamocco, they were forced back into Chioggia.

From July, after the fall of Ancona, the Austrians could once again concentrate all their naval forces on Venice. Dahlerup adopted a British naval tactic of pairing his three steamships with his three frigates. Towing the frigates through changing winds and tides, the steamships enabled him to bring their deadly fire to bear wherever he needed it. In contrast, with the exception of the Pio IX, Venice now had only sailing ships, which depended on favourable wind and tides to get out of port and then safely back in again. If they left port and the wind turned they would be stranded out at sea under the guns of the Austrian frigates. The Venetian ships therefore avoided putting out to sea as much as possible. When they did finally sail out to engage the Austrians on 8 August, they cruised up and down for two days without encountering enemy ships and then returned home.

Seeking to bring the prolonged resistance of the city to an end, the Austrians decided to try novel tactics. First Dahlerup also had a couple of Danish boatbuilders construct a Danish yolle (dinghy) in Trieste. Armed with a 60-pound Paixhans gun, it was ideal for venturing deep into the shallow creeks and channels around Venice. The Austrians also experimented with balloon-propelled bombs. Two artillery lieutenants, Franz von Uchatius and his brother Josef, invented a system for launching bombs into the air and letting the wind carry them to their target. They were first trialled on land but the adverse wind blew them back over the Austrian lines. A second launch was undertaken from the Volkan. They attempted to float some 200 incendiary balloons, each carrying a 24- to 30-pound bomb that was to be dropped with a time fuse over the besieged city. At least one bomb fell in the city; however, most missed their target. As it proved difficult and risky to arm and launch the balloons from a ship, the experiment was discontinued. These balloons the earliest recorded use of an unmanned aerial vehicle for war and the first offensive use of air power in naval aviation.

Eventually, hunger, exhaustion, relentless bombardment and the outbreak of cholera drove Venice to surrender on 22 August 1849, bringing the naval operations of the First Italian War of Independence to a close.

== Aftermath ==
=== Austrian navy ===
The First Italian War of Independence marked a turning point in the history of the Austrian Navy. Up until then, it was mostly made up of Italian crew members, the Italian language was the primary language, and even Italian ship names were used over German ones, such as Lipsia rather than Leipzig. Indeed, before 1848, the Navy was largely considered to be a "local affair of Venice". After 1848, most of the navy's officers corps hailed from the German-speaking parts of the Empire, while most of the sailors came from Istria and the Dalmatian Coast, leading to Croats, Germans, and even Hungarians being represented among the ranks of the Austrian Navy. After retaking Venice, the Austrians acquired several warships which were under construction or already seaworthy. Most of these ships were added to the strength of the Austrian Navy, increasing its size and strength considerably by the year 1850. The naval shipyard of Venice continued in use until it was lost to Austria in 1866.

=== Sardinian navy ===
The appointment of Camillo Benso, Count of Cavour as the Sardinian naval minister in 1850 marked the start of a period of reorganization; he restored discipline in the ships' crews and improved the technical quality of the fleet. He ordered the steam frigate Carlo Alberto from Britain, the first screw-driven warship of the Sardinian fleet. Three more frigates followed later in the 1850s, the Vittorio Emanuele, Maria Adelaide, and Duca di Genova. In 1860, Cavour added a pair of small ironclad warships, the Formidabile class, beginning a series of ironclads built for the Sardinian navy and later the Regia Marina; these ships started a naval arms race with Austria. To ensure better discipline and warlike spirit in its officer corps, Cavour worked to instill strong nationalist sentiment in the Sardinian naval academy in Genoa. In 1850 the navy was separated from the Ministry of War and Cavour himself took ministerial responsibility for it. Sardinia also began preparations to move its main naval base from the commercial port of Genoa to a new purpose-built site in La Spezia.

== See also ==
- Sardinian navy in the Crimean War
- Naval operations on Lake Garda (1866)
- Battle of Lissa (1866)
