= SMS Vulcano =

1843 Austrian navy paddle steamer

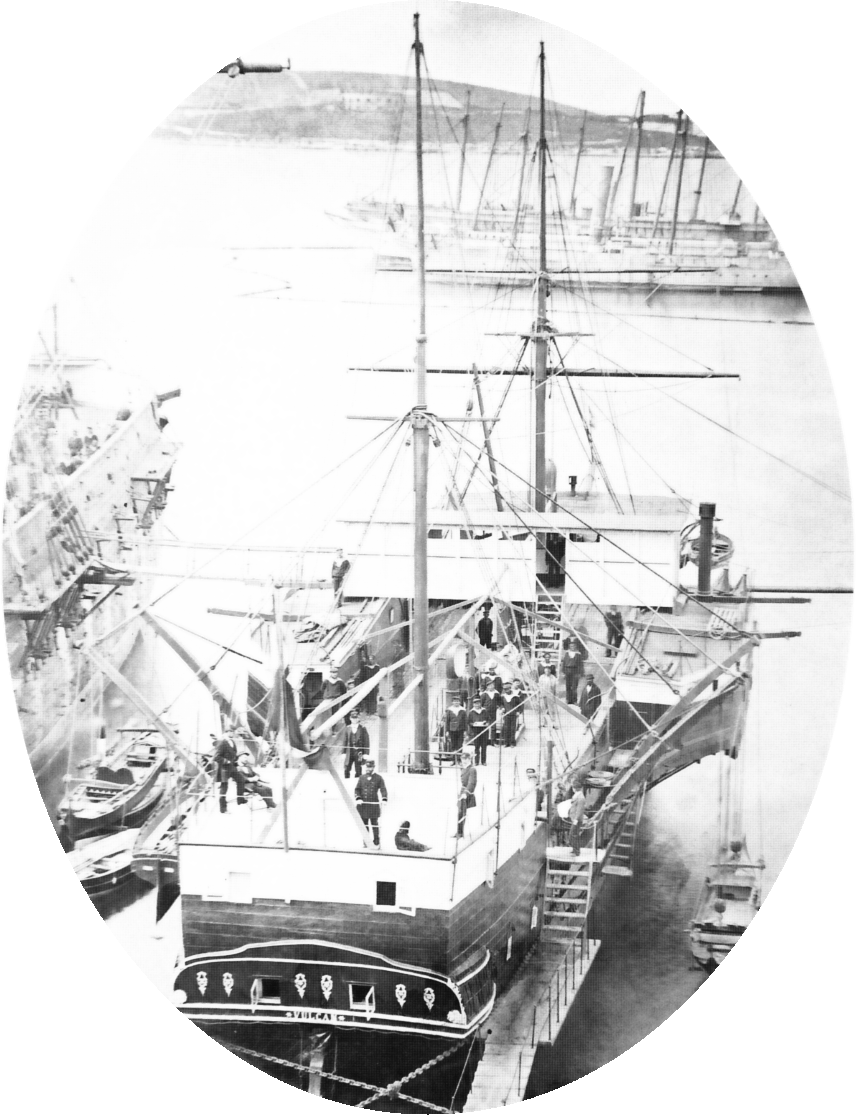
- SMS Vulcano

History

Austria-Hungary
- Name: Vulcano (renamed Vulkan / Vulcan)
- Launched: 1843
- Fate: In service until 1872, stricken in 1884 to become a coal hulk

General characteristics
- Displacement: 483 metric tons (475 long tons; 532 short tons)
- Installed power: 120 ihp (89 kW)
- Armament: 2 × 48 pounder guns; 4 × 12 pounder guns; paper hot air balloons with 24-30 pound bombs (1849 use)

SMS Vulcano (subsequently renamed to German Vulkan, also Vulcan) was a paddle steamer built for the Austro-Hungarian Navy in Venice and launched in 1843. Subsequently given the German name Vulkan, or Vulcan. Remained in service until 1872, and finally stricken in 1884 to become a coal hulk.

In 1849 the Vulcano, serving as a balloon carrier (the precursor to the aircraft carrier), launched hot air balloon bombs at Venice, the first offensive use of air power in naval aviation.

== Blockade of Venice ==
In 1848 Venice rebelled, declaring independence from the Austrian Empire. Vulcano and other Austrian vessels managed to escape capture, however most of their men deserted to the Venetian side, in many cases since non-Italian officers promised immediate discharges to their Italian sailors. In March 1848 Vulcano evacuated the personnel of the Austrian embassy from Naples, but the crew mutinied mid-route and attempted to direct the ship to Venice, however the ambassador Prince Felix of Schwarzenberg managed to restore order and direct the ship to Trieste.

Vulcano was part of squadron commanded by Captain Ludwig Kudriaffsky that blockaded Venice in April 1848. On 26 April 1848 the Vulcano (armed with two 48-pounders and four 12-pounders) intercepted a Greek brig attempting to break the blockade, but was engaged in a gun battle with the Venetian Pio Nono (armed with an 80-pounder Paixhan and a 24-pounder) who hit the Vulcano twice forcing her to withdraw.

=== Balloon bombardment ===
In July 1849 Vulcano took part in the first aggressive use of balloons in warfare, serving as a balloon carrier (the precursor to the aircraft carrier) in the first offensive use of air power in naval aviation. Austrian forces besieging Venice attempted to float some 200 paper hot air balloons, each carrying a 24- to 30-pound bomb that was to be dropped from the balloon with a time fuse over the besieged city. The balloons were launched mainly from land; however, some were also launched from Vulcano. The Austrians used smaller pilot balloons to determine the correct fuse settings. At least one bomb fell in the city; however, due to the wind changing after launch, most of the balloons missed their target, and some drifted back over Austrian lines and the launching ship Vulcano. On 4 July, she had run aground at Malamocco and come under fire from Manfrin Fort. A crew member was killed. She was damaged at her paddlebox. Vulcan was refloated the next day with assistance from SMS Custoza (1848) and the Austrian steamships Curtatone and Dorotea.

== Subsequent Service ==
In September 1869, a boiler explosion killed eleven of her crew and severely injured many more. On 17 November 1869, she was one of seventy ships, all of which drew less than 13 feet of water, that sailed through the Suez Canal in a procession marking the opening of the canal.

She remained in service until 1872, and finally struck in 1884 to become a coal hulk.

== See also ==
- Naval operations of the First Italian War of Independence
