= Hans Birch Dahlerup =

Danish naval officer (1790–1872)

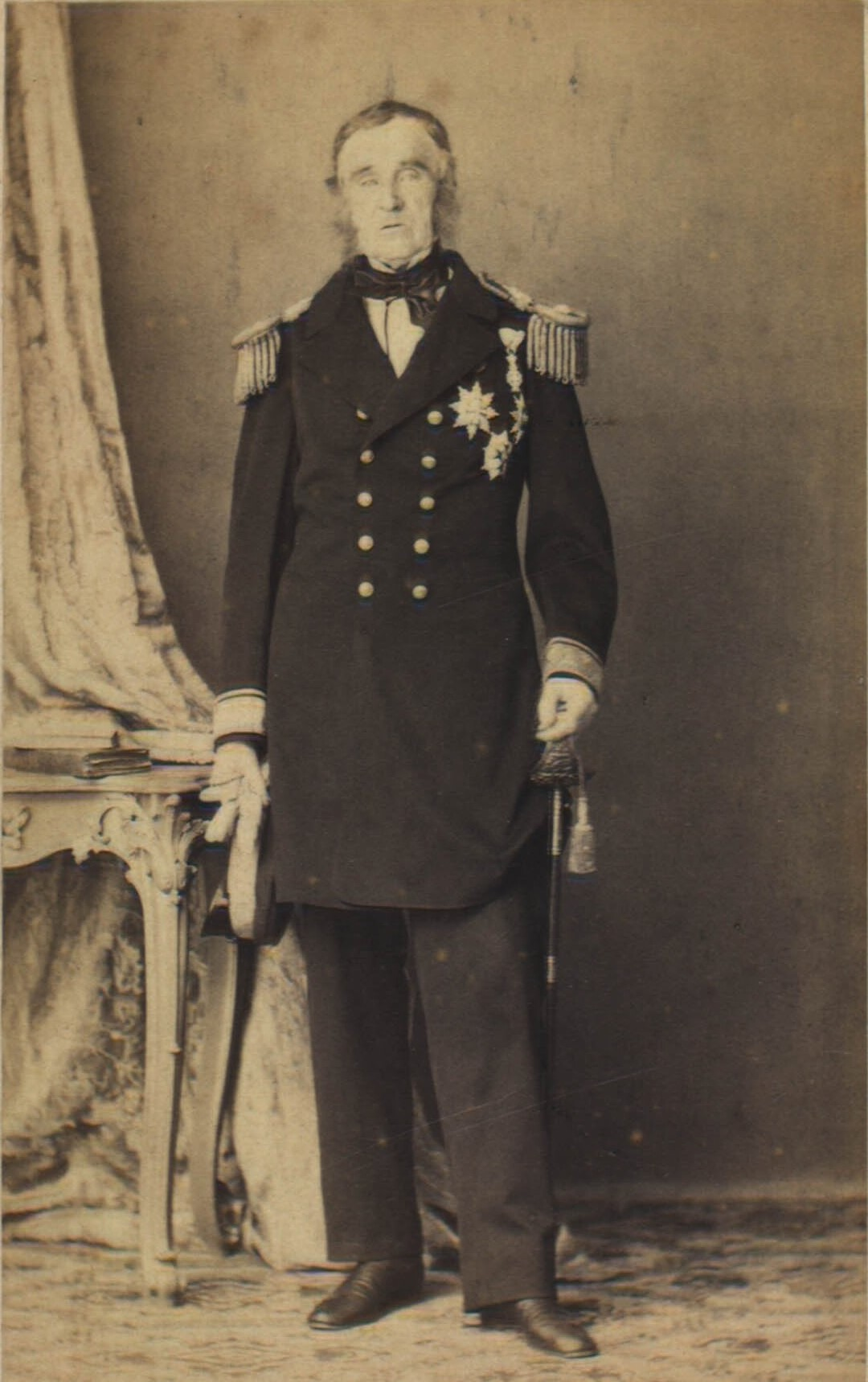
- Born: 25 August 1790; Hillerød, Zealand, Denmark-Norway
- Died: 1872 (aged 82) Copenhagen, Denmark
- Allegiance: Denmark-Norway; Denmark; Austrian Empire
- Branch: Royal Danish Navy; Austro-Hungarian Navy
- Rank: (Denmark–Norway) Counter Admiral (Austrian Empire) Vice Admiral
- Conflicts: English Wars; Gunboat War; Battle of Zealand Point; First Italian War of Independence

Vice-Admiral Hans Birch Dahlerup (25 August 1790 – 26 September 1872) was a Danish naval officer. He was among Denmark's most important naval strategists in the 19th century. Dahlerup rose through the ranks to become a counter admiral in the Royal Danish Navy. He also served as vice admiral and commander-in-chief of the Imperial Austrian Navy after the Revolution of 1848. Dahlerup rebuilt the Austrian navy and led the blockade and recapture of Venice in 1849. For these efforts, he was knighted by Franz Joseph I of Austria. Dahlerup had a broad interest in culture and science. He was fluent in German, English, French and Italian as foreign languages. He wrote his memoirs, published in four volumes after his death.

== Early life ==
Dahlerup grew up in a family of civil servants in Hillerød on Zealand. His father, Hans Jensen Dahlerup, came from a simple background in East Jutland, but as a young man he was employed by an official in Hillerød, and once sailed as a cabin clerk on a merchant ship to Tranquebar in India. Hans knew little else about his father's family and upbringing. When Hans was growing up, his father was the Amtmann in Frederiksborg County. He was also a civil magistrate and auctioneer. Later, he became a road tax collector, hospital superintendent, and postmaster. His mother, Sophie Marie Birch, was the daughter of a goldsmith. When she died in 1799 of tuberculosis, his father then married her sister, Vilhelmine.

The home was not particularly wealthy, but rich in talent. Hans read avidly from his father's book collection. Hans' brothers and half-brothers became lawyers, priests, and officers. His half-brother Edvard became King Christian VIII's personal physician. His sisters married officials. Dahlerup attended Latin school and considered a university education, but changed his mind after the British victory over the Danish navy in 1801. The fact that he had a brother three years older in the navy also played a role in his choice of career. He was not yet 16 when he completed the Royal Danish Naval Academy.

== Young naval officer during the Napoleonic Wars ==
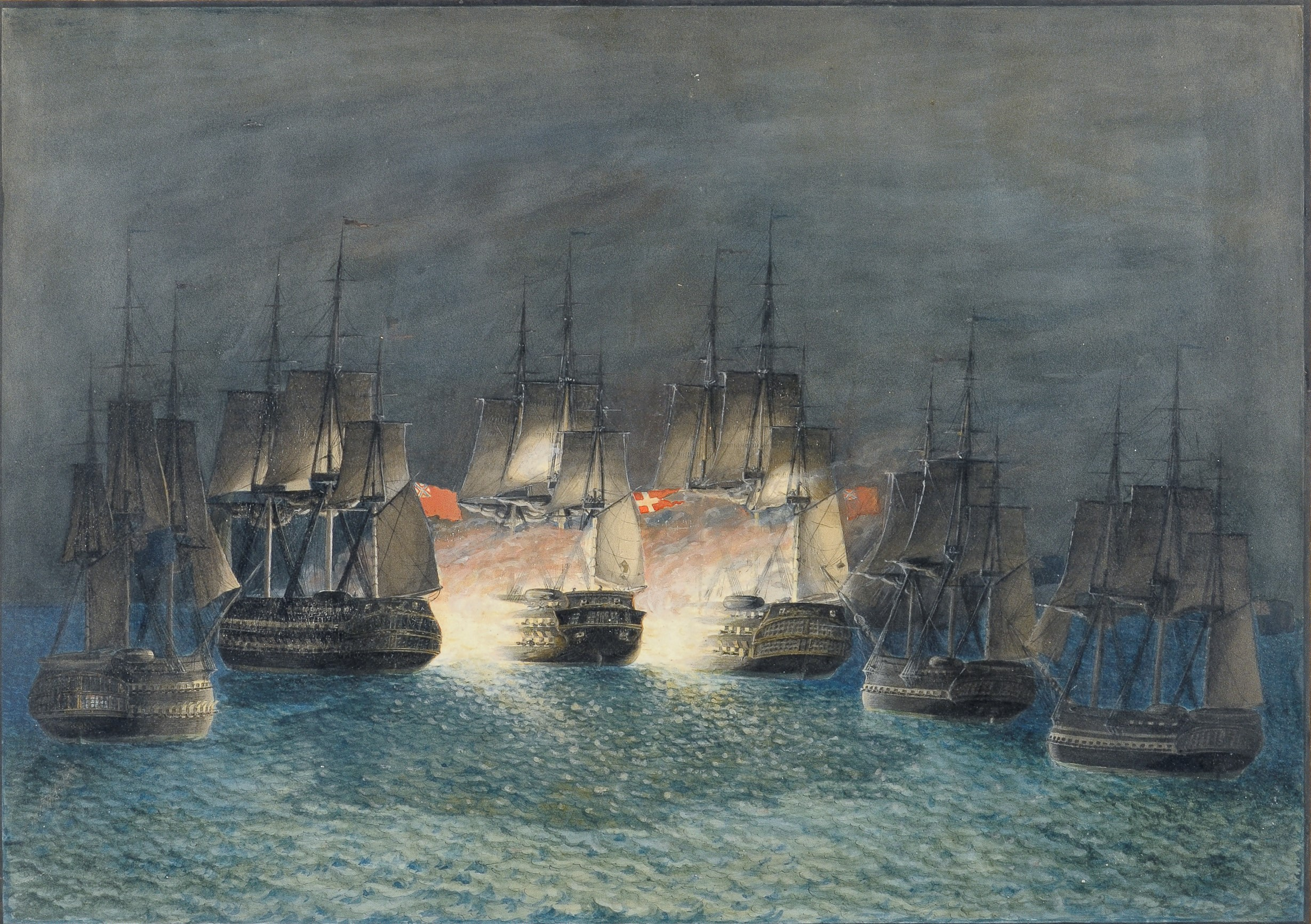
Dahlerup was first captured during the Battle of Zealand Point, where his brother Jens lost his life.

When the Gunboat War broke out between Denmark-Norway and Britain in 1807, he was a second lieutenant. He served on the ship of the line HDMS Prinds Christian Frederik, which had been sent to Norway and thus avoided the Battle of Copenhagen. He was seriously ill on the lower deck when the ship entered combat during the Battle of Zealand Point, where was captured by the British. As an officer, he was treated well, and the following year he was released.

Dahlerup then came to Silda as commander of two gun schooners and a gun dinghy, crewed by local fishermen, farmers and craftsmen. In 1810 they were attacked by a superior British force and he surrendered the schooner without loss of life. He was again captured and sent to Reading in England, but exchanged in 1811. Back in Bergen he was court-martialed for the surrender but was acquitted.

In the summer of 1813, he became commander of a gun sloop in the Sound, where his mission was to hinder British and Swedish convoys. In October he was reconnoitring in the Great Belt, but came across a British convoy and ended up being captured for the third time. He was imprisoned until the conclusion of peace in 1814.

== Merchant captain in the Danish West Indies ==
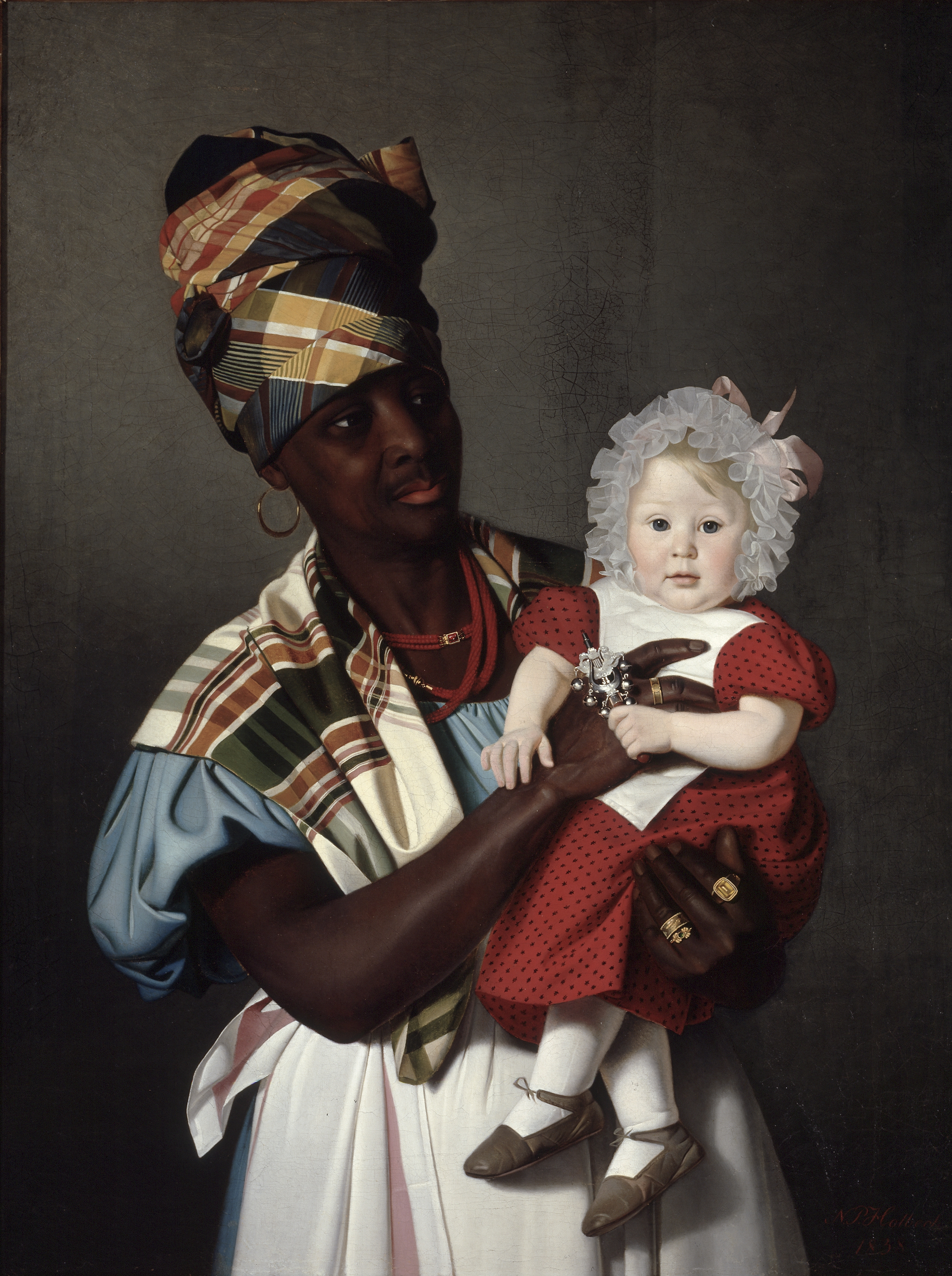
"Little Marie on Neky's arm", painting by Niels Peter Holbech (1838). Neky served in Dahlerup's home in Copenhagen. The Holbech and Dahlerup families knew each other, and Marie's younger sister Ursula was married to Hans Joost Vilhelm Dahlerup.

Dahlerup was employed as a teacher of navigation and mathematics at the Naval Academy, but was soon granted leave to sail in the merchant navy. At first, he was persuaded by an acquaintance from the navy, Louis de Coninck, to join as a mate, while Coninck was a shipowner and captain, to Lisbon and Málaga.

In 1816 he became captain of the British brig Sovereign. With him as mate, he had a friend from the navy, Henrik Sneedorff, son of admiral and head of the naval academy, Hans Christian Sneedorff. The crew was mostly Scandinavian. They sailed to Madeira and on to the Danish West Indies to load the ship with sugar and rum.

His stays in the Danish West Indies lasted for months, and Dahlerup became acquainted with many officials and plantation owners, but he particularly valued his friendship with Governor-General Adrian Benjamin Bentzon. In 1818, Dahlerup and Sneedorff bought their own brig and sailed to England, but were unable to make the venture profitable. They sold the ship and returned to the navy.

== Teacher and naval officer ==
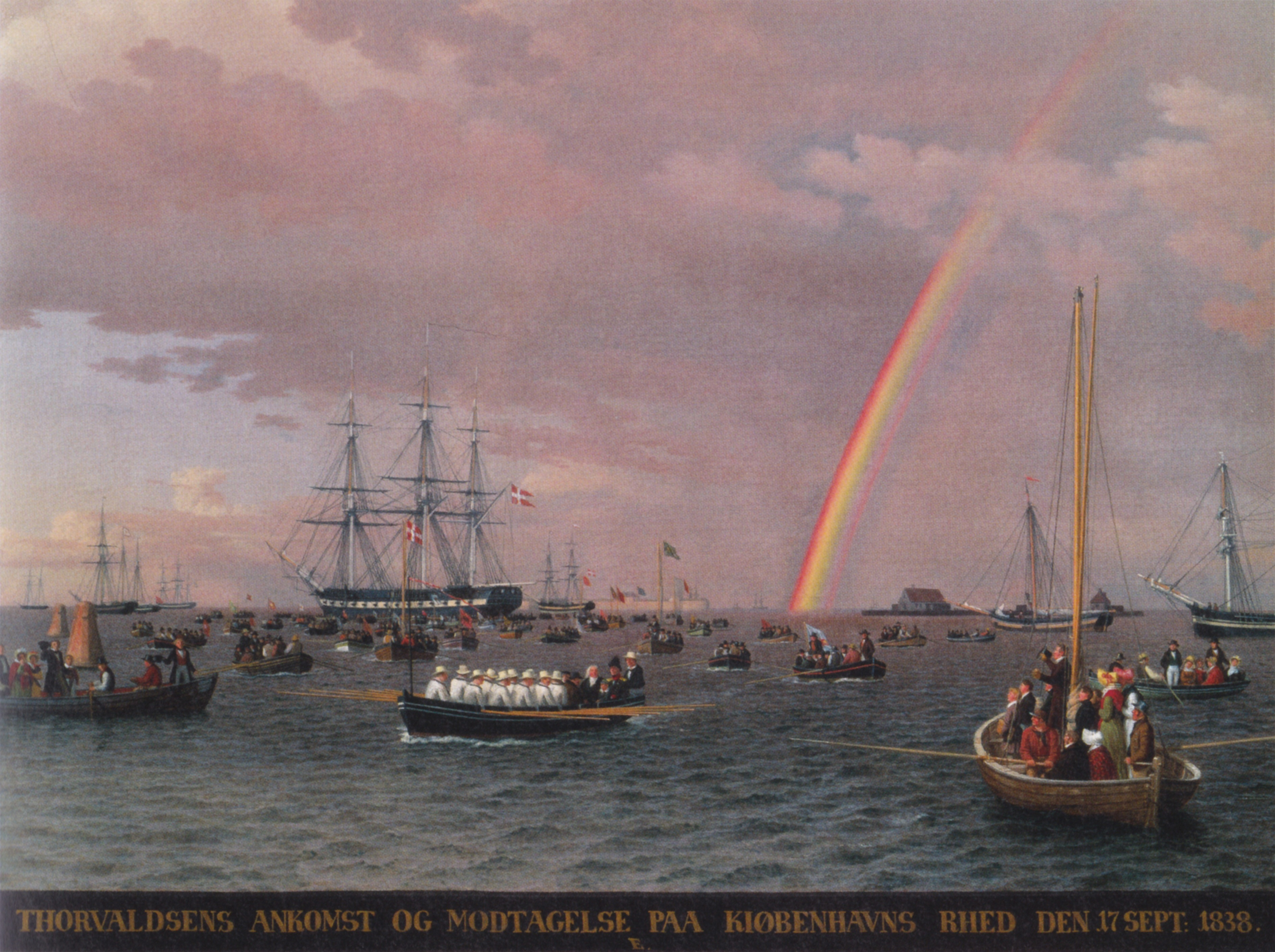
"Thorvaldsen's arrival at Copenhagen Rowing", by CW Eckersberg. Dahlerup is sitting next to Thorvaldsen in the rowing boat in the middle of the picture.

After completing his service in the merchant navy, Dahlerup taught English and naval artillery at the naval academy. He was also chairman of the da:Søe-Lieutenant-Selskabet and editor of the journal Archiv for Søvæsen. The journal addressed many current political issues, such as slavery in the Danish West Indies. Dahlerup himself brought a black woman, Neky, back to Denmark in the 1830s as a maid, but it is unclear whether she was a slave or free.

Dahlerup praised Governor-General Peter von Scholten's efforts to improve the living conditions of slaves in the Danish West Indies, including better education, the right to free their slaves, the right to change their own slave owners, and protection from arbitrary punishment. Dahlerup saw this as a first step towards "the threshold of complete civil freedom", but a slave revolt in 1848 led Scholten to immediately free all slaves.

In 1838 he took the frigate Rota to the Mediterranean, partly as a training exercise for the crew, and partly to bring the sculptor Bertel Thorvaldsen and his works home from Rome. Thorvaldsen was received as a hero in Copenhagen. In 1840, Dahlerup was promoted to commander-captain in the navy, and in 1847 to commander. He helped shape naval defence policy as a member of several commissions.

== 1848 revolution and entry into Austrian service ==
The revolutions of 1848 led to democratic reforms and national movements in many countries. In Denmark, it led to a transition to a constitutional monarchy with the Constitution of 1849, which Dahlerup never embraced. It also led to tensions in the Danish-controlled duchies of Schleswig, Holstein and Lauenburg, where pro-German elements received support from the German Confederation, leading to the First Schleswig War.

At the same time, a new Danish Ministry of the Navy was established under da: Christian Christopher Zahrtmann, an old friend of Dahlerup’s, who asked him to take on the task of getting the navy combat-ready. Dahlerup was in poor health and said he was too busy with other tasks. After the armistice in August 1848, Dahlerup published a paper criticizing Zahrtmann's naval strategy. The government disliked his outspokenness but thought it best not to intervene. This incident made Dahlerup and Zahrtmann become enemies.

In February 1849, Zahrtmann was asked by an Austrian envoy to allow an experienced Danish naval officer to take command of the shattered and demoralized Austrian navy. (The practice of naval officers entering the service of foreign powers, even in wartime, was more common before the formation of European nation-states). The Danish government saw this as an opportunity to split Austria and Prussia, who were competing for leadership of the German Confederation, while both were also confronting the Danes in Schleswig and Holstein. Zahrtmann invited Dahlerup to take up the offer. Dahlerup was reluctant but was eventually persuaded that it was important to “the Danish cause". Zahrtmann also thereby got rid of "a troublesome and competent critic". Dahlerup agreed to resign from the Danish Navy with the rank of counter admiral, with the right to resume his rank if he returned.

== Naval war in the Adriatic ==
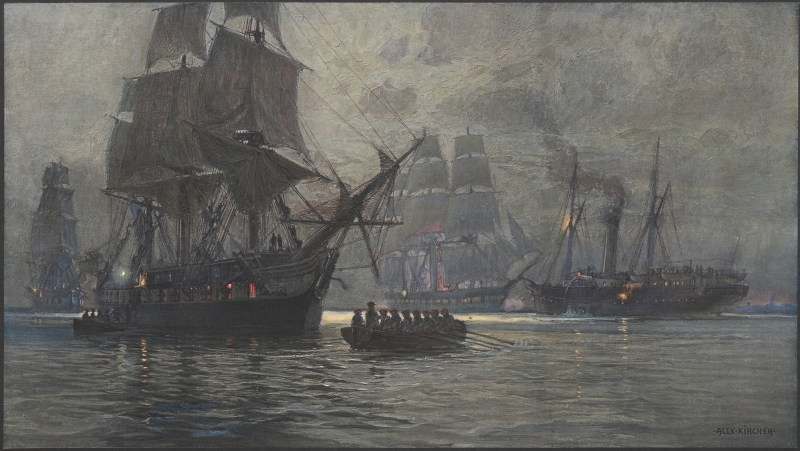
Austrian blockade of Venice

Dahlerup arrived in Vienna in March 1849, where he was favoured by the young Emperor Franz Joseph I, Prime Minister Felix zu Schwarzenberg, and Minister of War Franz von Cordon. They gave him free rein to reorganize the navy. The matter was urgent because the 1848 revolution had cost Austria control of the Kingdom of Lombardy–Venetia. In its main naval port of Venice, revolutionaries within the fleet had deserted and seized most of the Austrian warships. However, after its defeat at the battle of Custoza, the Kingdom of Sardinia was obliged to abandon its support for Venice and withdraw its fleet. Dahlerup then led a reorganized Austrian squadron to Venice and blockaded it. In May 1849 Dahlerup also blockaded and bombarded the Ancona, which surrendered to the Austrians on 19 June.

Venice itself surrendered on 22 August, after which there was a huge celebration. "It was a triumph that surpassed in pomp anything I had ever experienced," recalled Dahlerup. He and Field Marshal Radetzky sailed down the Grand Canal, to salutes and flag-raising. At St. Mark's Square, they were presented with the keys to the city by the city's officials and clergy and mass of thanksgiving was then held in St. Mark's Basilica. Emperor Franz Joseph honoured Dahlerup with the Knight's Cross of the Order of the Iron Crown, and with it the rank of baron and appointment to the Privy Council. Austria’s ally, Pope Pius IX, awarded Dahlerup the Grand Cross of the Order of Saint Gregory the Great.

== Reform of the Austrian navy ==
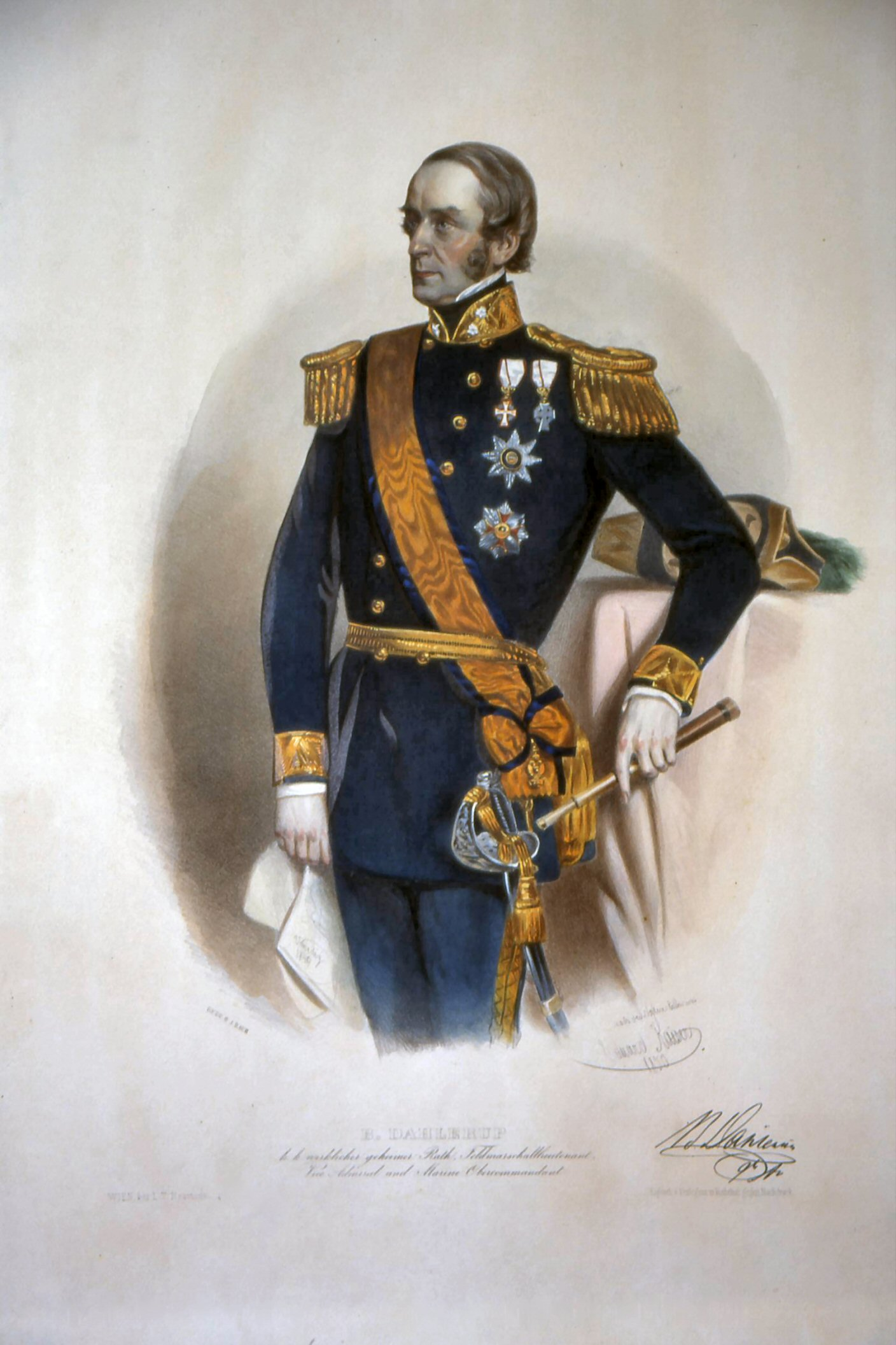
1850 portrait of Dahlerup by Eduard Kaiser.

Dahlerup set out to train a corps of naval officers who were loyal to the emperor. None of the Venetian officers who had deserted in 1848 were allowed to return. The main naval station was moved to Pula, while the naval command and shipyards were moved to Trieste, and new schools, barracks and an arsenal were established. German now replaced Italian as the language of command. Dahlerup recommended acquiring new ships and new naval artillery. Although new steamships were commissioned, he mostly continued to rely on sailing ships as the backbone of the navy. He recruited many German and Scandinavian officers and engineers. However, as he did not want to be accused of favouring his own people, generally avoided giving Scandinavians the command of ships of the line. The two exceptions were the Norwegian no:Ferdinand Wedel-Jarlsberg and the Swede Eric af Klint. Nevertheless, he was accused by German nationalists of “danifying" the navy. He tried to put an end to officers being promoted at their own request, or because they were of noble lineage. While rebuilding the Austrian navy, Dahlerup also wanted to undermine Austrian ambitions within the German Confederation which might lead to the navy coming under some kind of unified German command structure.

Dahlerup found the many intrigues in the Austrian military very wearing. He began to sense that he no longer had the emperor's full confidence, and rumours began to circulate of his resignation. In July 1851, Dahlerup was formally dismissed by the emperor's adjutant general Karl Ludwig von Grünne. He was offered a position as naval inspector but decided to go home. Minister of War Anton Csorich granted him a life pension, which Dahlerup was assured would not stand in the way of re-entering Danish service. "How much he deceived himself or me in this, I very soon saw," he wrote in his memoirs.

== Conflict in Denmark ==
Upon his return, Dahlerup expected to enter the Danish navy as a counter admiral, ranking ahead of Zahrtmann, in accordance with his rank of Vice Admiral in Austria. However, creating a new position of counter admiral now required the consent of the Danish Parliament. Minister of the Navy Carl van Dockum, Dahlerup's brother-in-law, instead offered him the rank of counter admiral, after Zahrtmann. Dockum believed it was unreasonable for an officer who had retired from Danish service to be promoted ahead of his former officer colleagues.

Dahlerup was deeply offended and believed that the king and government had broken their promises. He instead applied for a pension, but the government’s view was that he was not entitled to this as long as he was receiving a pension from Austria. He filed a lawsuit against the treasury but lost. Instead, he was exempted from paying the royal tax for his Grand Cross of the Order of the Dannebrog, which he had been awarded on the recommendation of Dockum. Only foreigners were exempt from royal tax, and Dahlerup, therefore, felt that he was not being treated as if he were Danish. "Even in the presence of the king he adorned himself with Austrian ribbons and orders without wearing the Grand Cross that the king had given him as a sign of his goodwill," wrote Dockum, who called Dahlerup "haughty and repulsive in his behaviour."

Dahlerup therefore retired and wrote his memoirs, which were published in four volumes after his death. He also published his Naturphilosophiske og culturhistoriske Betragtninger (1862).

== Later years ==
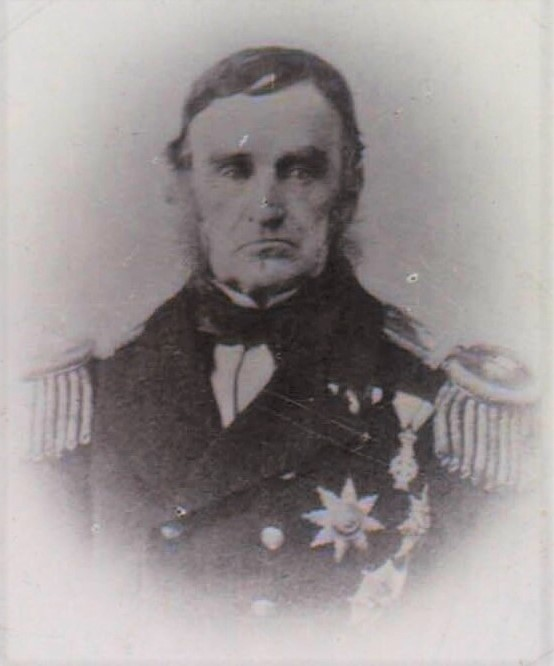
Hans Birch Dahlerup in 1872

Meanwhile, Emperor Franz Joseph’s brother, Archduke Ferdinand Maximilian, had become Commander-in-Chief of the Austrian Navy in 1854. Ferdinand Maximilian had previously served in the navy under Dahlerup. In 1861 he persuaded Dahlerup to come back to Trieste to become his technical advisor on the conversion of wooden ships to ironclads.

During the Second Schleswig War, the Austrians and Prussians combined their naval forces against the Danish. In 1864, Wilhelm von Tegetthoff, who had helped persuade Dahlerup to return to the Austrian navy, was the Austrian commander during the Battle of Heligoland. The Austrians did not involve Dahlerup in the war preparations against Denmark, but he was still embarrassed by the situation.

Ferdinand Maximilian allowed himself to be proclaimed Emperor of Mexico in 1864, and as such he awarded Dahlerup the Grand Cross of the Mexican Order of Guadalupe. The Austrian victory at the Battle of Lissa, the first in the world between armoured vessels, has been largely attributed to Dahlerup's training and reforms.

By January 1865, Dahlerup's eyesight had become so poor that he resigned from his position in Trieste and returned to Denmark. He was practically blind for the remaining years of his life. He lived in his mansion "Christiansholm" in Frederiksberg. The furniture was given to him by the Austrian emperor; gilded furniture with silk and satin upholstery, large chandeliers, Turkish carpets and Venetian mirrors from floor to ceiling.

== Family life ==
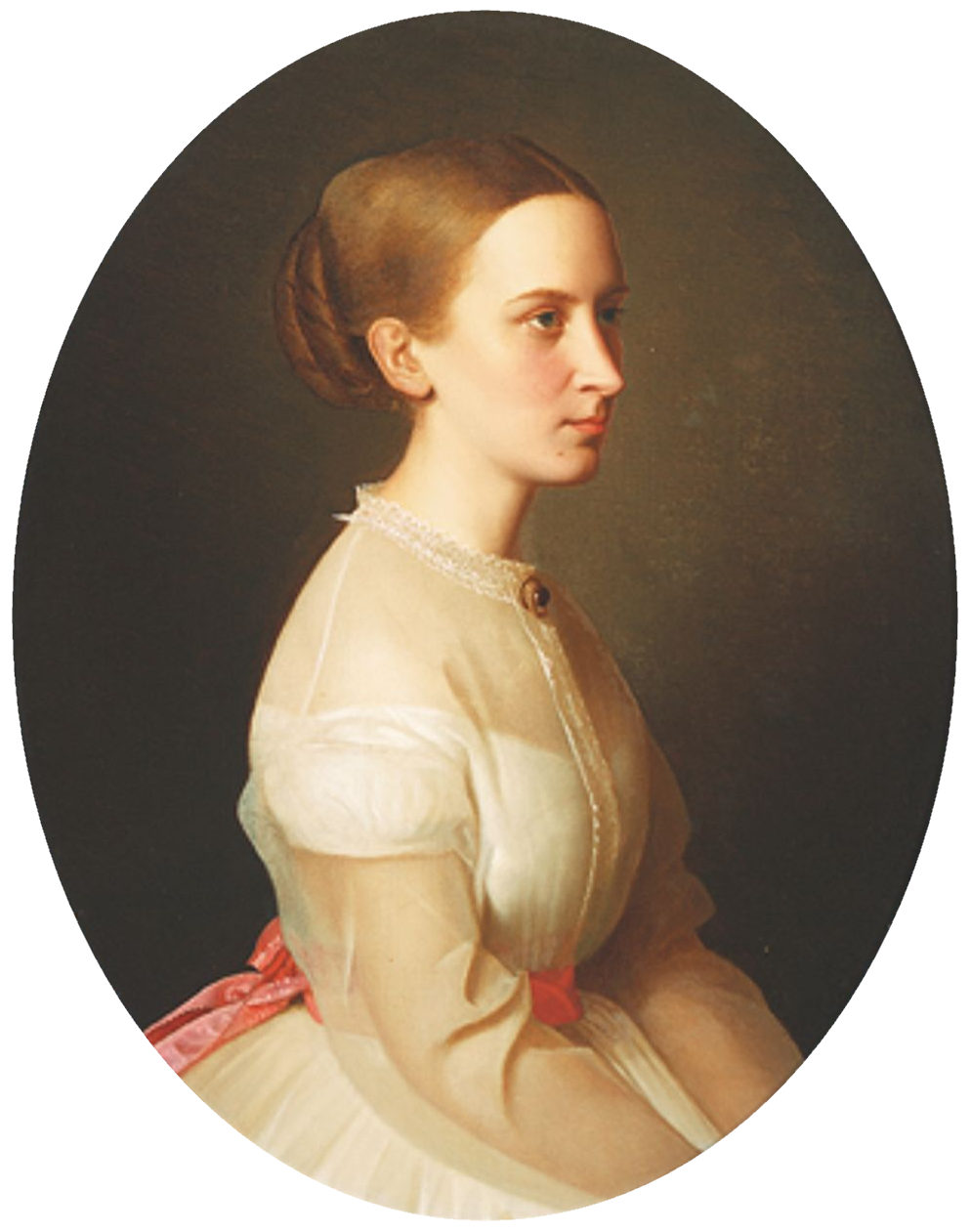
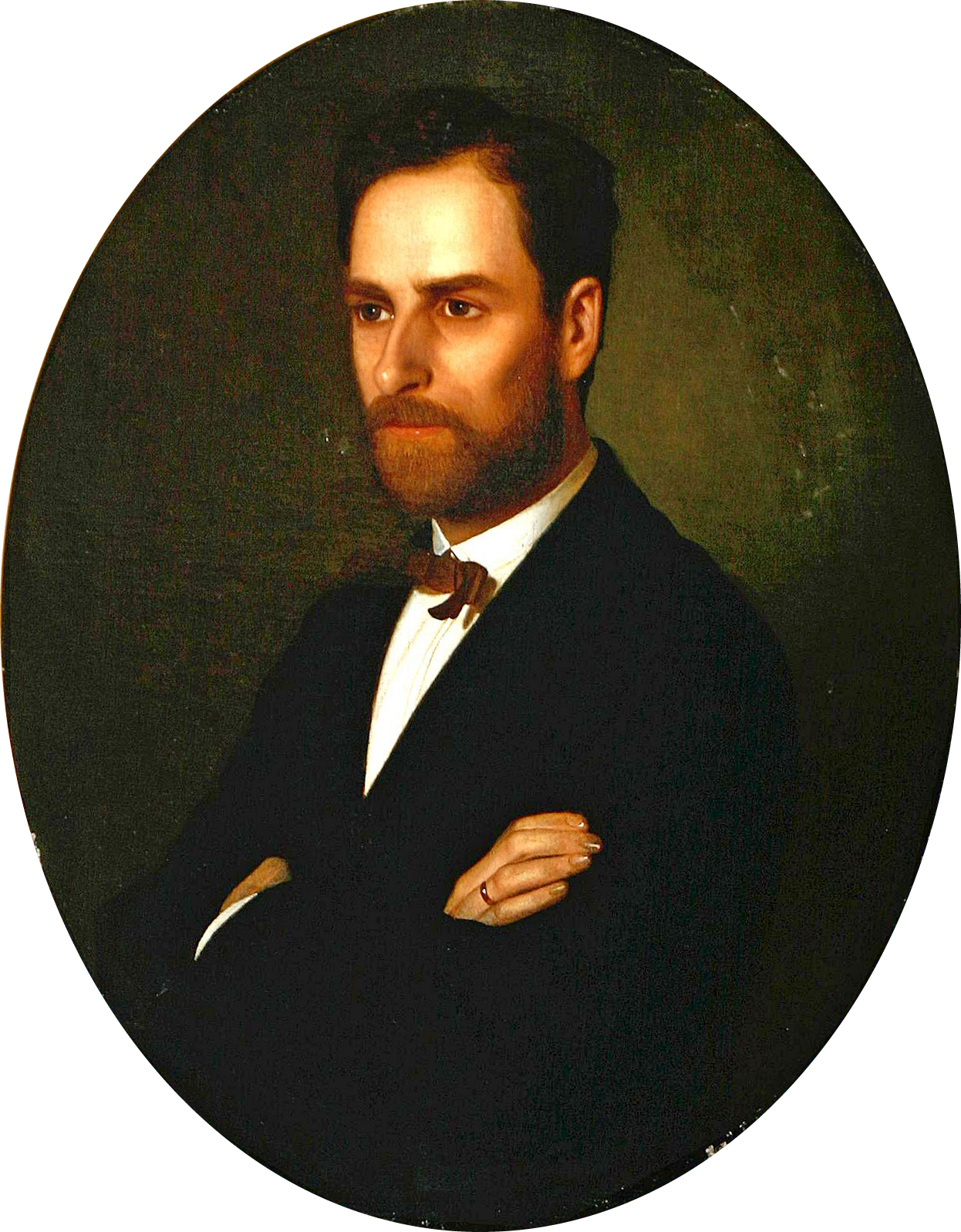
Ursula, née Holbech and Hans Joost Vilhelm Dahlerup.

In 1829 Dahlerup married Louise Margrethe van Dockum (1799–1840), daughter of Admiral Jost van Dockum and sister of the later Admiral and Minister of the Navy Carl Edvard van Dockum.

He wrote in his memoirs that he did not marry for love – "I was beyond the age when one can generally feel it in its full force and indulge in its rapture" – but the marriage was happy. He recalled with great sadness how Louise died of an incurable heart disease.

Hans and Louise Dahlerup had three children. Their son Hans Joost Vilhelm Dahlerup (1830–1876) became a lawyer and married Ursula Holbech, daughter of a family friend, the painter Niels Peter Holbech. Their daughter Ida Susanne Dahlerup (1833–1908) remained unmarried. They also had a son who died as an infant.

Admiral Dahlerup held his daughter-in-law Ursula in high regard, and he was, according to her, "unboundedly happy" to become a grandfather. She had to struggle with her husband's neuroses and pathological jealousy. But as long as her father-in-law was alive, she was "almost happy," she wrote in her memoirs. She described him as witty, chivalrous, and charming. She also managed to reconcile Dahlerup with his brother-in-law, Admiral Dockum, after many years of hostility.

In the autumn of 1872, Dahlerup stood, as he usually did, outside the Copenhagen customs house to listen to the cannon salute for foreign warships. He caught a cold and died the next day. Like many other naval officers, he was buried in the Holmen cemetery. The childhood friends Dahlerup, Zahrtmann and Dockum had once bought three family graves next to each other so that they could also be together in death.

Hans Birch Dahlerup's descendants were granted the right to bear the Austrian baronial title, according to a letter of nobility of 1 August 1851, but were never naturalized as a Danish noble family. Instead, they have used the equivalent titles "baron" and "baroness".

== Honours ==

Grand Cross of the Order of St. Gregory the Great (Holy See)

Knight First Class of the Order of the Iron Crown (Austria)

Grand Cross of the Order of the Dannebrog (Denmark)

Grand Cross of the Order of Guadalupe (Mexico)
