= Giuseppe Albini (admiral) =

Italian admiral and politician

Count Giuseppe Albini
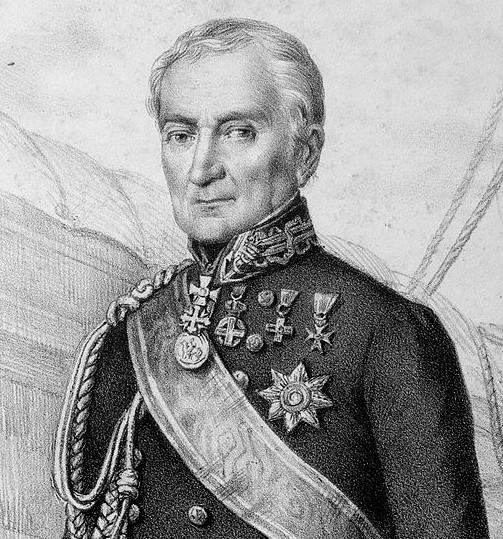
- Born: 20 September 1780; Villefranche-sur-Mer, Sardinia
- Died: 31 July 1859 (aged 78); Spotorno, Sardinia
- Military career
- Allegiance: Sardinia
- Branch: Royal Sardinian Navy
- Service years: c. 1790s–1850s
- Rank: Vice-admiral
- Unit: Alceste
- Commands: Naval General Staff; Adriatic squadron Regina; Commercio di Genova; Veloce; Carloforte; Benvenuto; Vittorio Emanuele
- Conflicts: French Revolutionary Wars; War of the First Coalition; Siege of Toulon (1793); Barbary Wars; First Italian War of Independence
- Awards: Grand Officer of the Military Order of Savoy; Grand Officer of the Order of Saints Maurice and Lazarus; Commander of the Order of the Crown of Italy; Knight of the Civil Order of Savoy; Commander of the Order of the Oak Crown; Commander of the Order of Isabella the Catholic; Order of St. Gregory the Great; Knight of the Order of Saint Stanislaus; Knight of the Order of the Medjidie
- Other work: Member of the Italian Geographical Society

Senator of the Kingdom of Sardinia
- In office 3 April 1848 – 31 July 1859

Count Michele Giuseppe Albini (Villefranche-sur-Mer, 20 September 1780 – Spotorno, 31 July 1859) was an Italian admiral and politician, who was commander of the naval squadron of the Royal Sardinian Navy sent to the aid of the Republic of Venice during the First Italian War of Independence. Senator of the Kingdom of Sardinia, awarded the honours of Grand Officer of the Military Order of Savoy, and Grand Officer of the Order of Saints Maurice and Lazarus, he was the father of the admirals Giovan Battista and Augusto Albini.

== Career ==
He began his military career at a very young age in Sardinian navy in the port of Nice, and having embarked as a young officer on the frigate Alceste, he took part in the siege of Toulon and was subsequently taken prisoner of war on 8 June 1794, when the Alceste was captured by the French frigate Boudeuse.

Promoted to lieutenant in December 1803, he was commander of the xebec Vittorio Emanuele during the campaign against the Barbary pirates. He commanded the launch Benvenuto during the hydrographic expedition for the drafting of a new portolan of Sardinia designed by him, and during the capture of a small corsair vessel under Cape Bon in 1808. He was subsequently commander of the xebec Carloforte with which he captured a French corsair in 1810 and two Barbary merchantmen in 1811. Promoted to lieutenant in 1812, he commanded the brig Veloce in the Capraia expedition (1815), and was then promoted to 1st lieutenant and then 3rd captain.

Captain of the vessel in 2nd rank, he was commander of the corvette Aurora operating in the waters off Tunisia (5 May - 2 June 1830), and then of the frigates it: Commercio di Genova (1832) and Regina (1839-1840). Having become rear admiral in 1838, he was made Senator of the Kingdom of Sardinia (3 April 1848). After the outbreak of the first war of independence he assumed command of the squadron sent to the Adriatic to help the Republic of Venice. During this assignment, he had some disagreements with rear admiral it:Giorgio Mameli, vice-commander of the naval squadron. On 20 October 1848 he was awarded the title of Commander of the Order of Saints Maurice and Lazarus.

The command of the fleet was taken away from him in 1849 for having hesitated to obey the order to bring the Sardinian fleet and troops back to La Spezia. as required in the armistice agreement signed by the Piedmontese and Austrian governments. The naval fleet left Ancona and went to Venice to embark the soldiers of the Sardinian Army present there, but the fact caused a partial mutiny of the crews of the ships, in particular on the frigates San Michele (the flagship) and Beroldo. Promoted to the rank of vice-admiral and made count on 3 April 1850, he entered the Naval General Staff, and the Permanent Consultative Congress, of the general council of maritime health and of the Commission for the examination of the bill on military recruitment (5 February 1851).

He was awarded the honours of Grand Officer of the Order of Saints Maurice and Lazarus (26 April) and Grand Officer of the Military Order of Savoy (12 June 1856). member of the Italian Geographical Society since 1868, author of a Portolan of Liguria, he donated the pendulum abandoned in San Stefano in 1793 by Napoleon Bonaparte to the naval museum.in Santo Stefano.

== Personal life ==
He was the son of Giovanni Battista Albini and the noblewoman Carmen Maddalena Evangelisti Alighiero. He married Raffaella D'Ornano, a relative of Philippe Antoine d'Ornano, uncle of Napoleon Bonaparte, with whom he had six children: Giovan Battista, Giorgio, Augusto, Maddalena, Giovanna (who married a nobleman of the Campofregoso family of Genoa) and Francesca.

== Honours ==
=== Italian honours ===
Grand Officer of the Military Order of Savoy - ribbon for ordinary uniform

Grand Officer of the Military Order of Savoy
— 12 June 1856

Grand Officer of the Order of Saints Maurice and Lazarus - ribbon for ordinary uniform

Grand Officer of the Order of Saints Maurice and Lazarus
— 20 April 1856

Commander of the Order of the Crown of Italy - ribbon for ordinary uniform

Commander of the Order of the Crown of Italy
— posthumous, 1877

Knight of the Civil Order of Savoy - ribbon for ordinary uniform

Knight of the Civil Order of Savoy
— 20 January 1849

=== Foreign honours ===
Commander of the Order of the Oak Crown (Netherlands) - ribbon for ordinary uniform

Commander of the Order of the Oak Crown (Netherlands)

Commander of the Order of Isabella the Catholic (Spain) - ribbon for ordinary uniform

Commander of the Order of Isabella the Catholic (Spain)

Cavaliere dell'Ordine di San Gregorio Magno (Stato della Chiesa) - ribbon for ordinary uniform

Order of St. Gregory the Great (Papal States)

Cavaliere di I classe dell'Ordine di San Stanislao (Impero russo) - ribbon for ordinary uniform

Knight First Class of the Order of Saint Stanislaus (Russian Empire)

Cavaliere di V classe dell'Ordine di Medjidié (Impero Ottomano) - ribbon for ordinary uniform

Knight Fifth Class of the Order of the Medjidie (Ottoman Empire)
