= Louis-Alphonse de Ricaudy =

French vice-admiral (1789–1856)

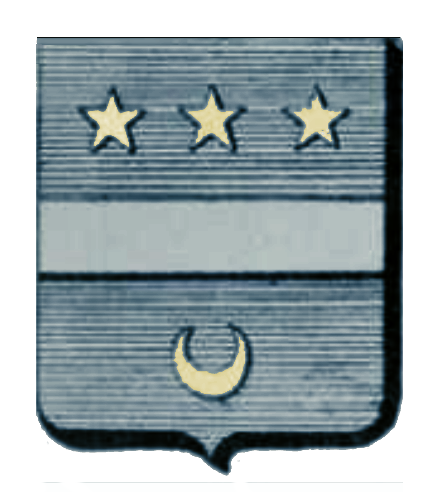
Coat of arms of the De Ricaudy family associated with Louis-Alphonse de Ricaudy

Louis-Alphonse de Ricaudy (4 July 1789 Sisteron – 16 February 1856 Perpignan), was a French vice-admiral.

== Biography ==
He was the son of César de Ricaudy, a lawyer at court, and of Césarine de Saizieu, daughter of Antoine Étienne Lazare Barthélémy de Saizieu (consul of France in Tunis and baron of the Empire) and sister of fr:Louis François Richard Barthélémy de Saizieu.

He enlisted in 1801, at the age of 12, as a cabin boy and became an officer candidate on September 17, 1803. Enlisted on the frigate Le Rhin, he took part in the American campaign under the command of Admiral de Villeneuve. In 1805 he took part in the battle of Cape Finisterre, then on 21 October 1805 at the Battle of Trafalgar. He was able to escape but his frigate Le Rhin was captured by the English a few months later, on July 28, 1806. He was a prisoner of war for five years in England before being released, in an exchange, in November 1811.

On 1 July 1815 he was appointed ensign on the schooner La Bacchante. Appointed lieutenant in 1821, he was also made, later the same year, knight of the Legion of Honor. In 1830 he participated in the invasion of Algiers, on the frigate Belle-Gabrielle; he commanded a landing company on the beach of Sidi Fredj. His conduct during this campaign earned him the rank of frigate captain on 2 October 1830. Captain de Ricaudy then commanded the fluyt La Meuse and then the corvette l'Ariane with which he took part in a South American campaign, lasting two and a half years, to protect and assist French commerce on the coasts of Brazil, Chile and Peru. Back in France, now a ship's captain, Ricaudy held various commands before being appointed, in 1842, director of the port at Toulon.

In 1848 he commanded a squadron that deterred an Austrian attack on Venice during the First Italian War of Independence, where his conduct and services were recognized with the rank of rear admiral on 16 October 1848. He was promoted to the rank of Commander of the Legion of Honor by decree of April 28, 1849.

He left active service in June 1853.

Two of his children graduated from the École navale and became officers in their turn: Louis Théodore Bernard de Ricaudy (1834–1924) and Louis Alphonse Dominique de Ricaudy (1839–1898). His daughter Claire Alphonsine de Ricaudy married Raphael Vergès. From this marriage was born Emmanuel Vergès De Ricaudy, a Catalan regionalist.
