= Raffaele de Cosa =

Italian admiral (1778–1856)

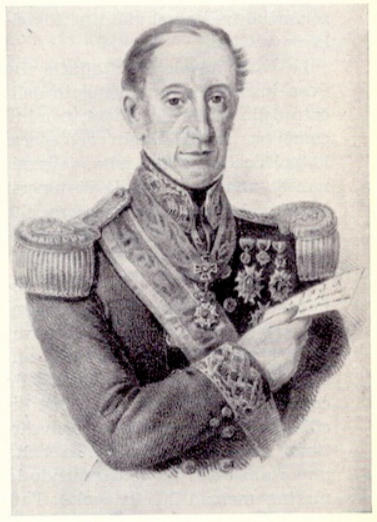
- Born: 24 May 1778; Naples, Kingdom of Naples
- Died: 29 February 1856 (aged 77); Naples, Kingdom of the Two Sicilies
- Military career
- Allegiance: Napoleonic Naples; Kingdom of the Two Sicilies
- Service: Neapolitan Navy; Real Marina
- Rank: Admiral
- Conflicts: Napoleonic Wars; Action of 3 May 1810 (surrendered)

Raffaele de Cosa (24 May 1778 – 29 February 1856) was an Italian admiral. He served the Napoleonic Kingdom of Naples, and after the overthrow of Napoleon he served in the Royal Navy of the Kingdom of the Two Sicilies, rising to the rank of admiral.

== Sources ==
- De Majo, Silvio (1987). "De Cosa, Raffaele". Dizionario Biografico degli Italiani. Vol. 33. Treccani (online ed.). Retrieved 22 May 2023.
