= Real Marina (Kingdom of the Two Sicilies) =

Navy of the Kingdom of the Two Sicilies

Royal Navy of the Kingdom of the Two Sicilies
- Real Marina del Regno delle Due Sicilie
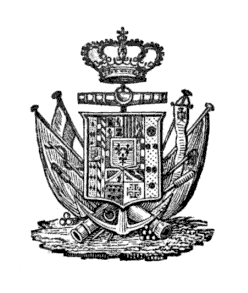
- Coat of arms of the Real Marina
- Active: 1816–1861
- Allegiance: Kingdom of the Two Sicilies
- Type: Navy

Insignia
- Pennant

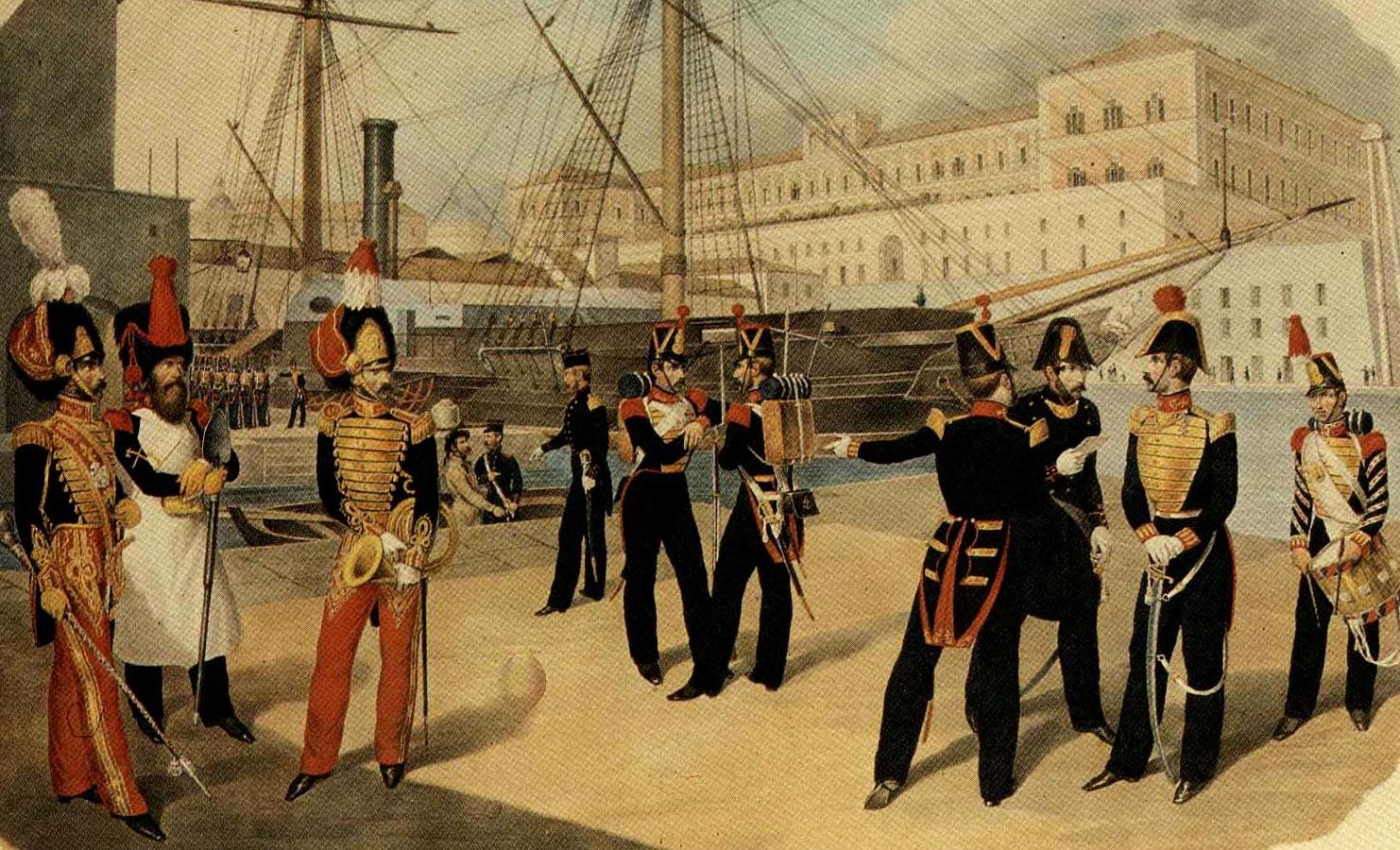
Officers of the Real Marina in Naples

The Royal Navy of the Kingdom of the Two Sicilies (Italian: Real Marina del Regno delle Due Sicilie) was the navy of the Kingdom of the Two Sicilies. Along with the army of the Two Sicilies, it formed the kingdom's armed forces. The navy was the most important of the Italian navies prior to the unification of Italy and Camillo Benso, Count of Cavour made it the model of the new Italian Regia Marina after the Kingdom of Italy's annexation of the Two Sicilies.

== History ==
In June 1815, King Ferdinand, the ruler of the kingdoms of Naples and Sicily, returned to the city of Naples from Palermo together with the remnants of the Neapolitan and Sicilian navies. The Neapolitan War had ended a month earlier with the defeat of Joachim Murat's attempt to maintain control over his Neapolitan kingdom. Of Murat's small navy, two ships of the line were handed over to the British while two frigates, two schooners, one corvette and 24 gunboats were given to Ferdinand. The new regime in Naples proceeded to form a navy modelled after the Spanish Navy.

On 8 December 1816, the Kingdom of the Two Sicilies was founded, unifying the kingdoms of Naples and Sicily under Ferdinand. In 1818, the General Ordinances of the Royal Navy of the Two Sicilies were promulgated, stipulating the new navy's composition and organisation. The first naval regulation issued by the new kingdom, the ordinances constituted various bodies of naval officers along with ordering the founding of a nautical observatory, a naval academy and three naval bases located at Naples, Palermo and Messina respectively. In the same year, the new Marine Regulation was issued. By 1820, the navy was considerably expanded and comprised three divisions with about 70 warships of all types.

In July 1820, the Sicilian frigate Amalia led several warships which convoyed an expeditionary force under Lieutenant-general Florestano Pepe which had been sent to suppress a rebellion in Sicily. On 2 September 1820, a Sicilian fleet consisting of the ship of the line Capri, Amalia, corvette Leone, polacca Sant'Antonio e Italia and 14 brigantines (reinforced on 3 September by six gunboats and a bomb vessel) was sent to Sicily to suppress revolutionary movements there. Between 1827 and 1828, the 44-gun frigate Regina Isabella, 32-gun corvette Cristina and brigantines Prince Charles and Francis I joined the navy.

== See also ==
- Naval operations of the First Italian War of Independence
