= Niels Kjærbølling =

Danish ornithological writer and lithographer

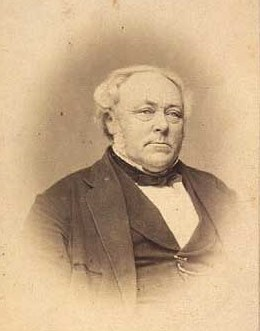
- Niels Kjærbølling by Budtz Müller
- Born: 11 October 1806
- Died: 2 January 1871 (aged 64)
- Occupations: Ornithological writer and lithographer

Niels Kjærbølling (11 October 1806 – 2 January 1871) was a Danish ornithological writer and lithographer. He founded a menagerie in 1859, which is considered the predecessor of the Copenhagen zoo. He popularlized bird study in Denmark with some of the earliest illustrated works on the birds of the region.

== Early life ==
Kjærbølling was born in Als to school teacher Jørgen Nielsen and Marie (born Lorentzen). The library at Augustenborg awakened scholarly interests. He qualified to become a teacher at Skaarup Seminary in 1827 and taught at Marstal (1831) and Ærøskøbing (1836). With a vivid interest in nature, Kjærbølling used all of his spare time to pursue botanical studies and observe bird life. In 1843 he published a handbook of outdoor and flower gardening, and the following year, he gained the post of inspector at the Jutland, Funen and Schleswig created gardens at Snoghøj.

== Career ==
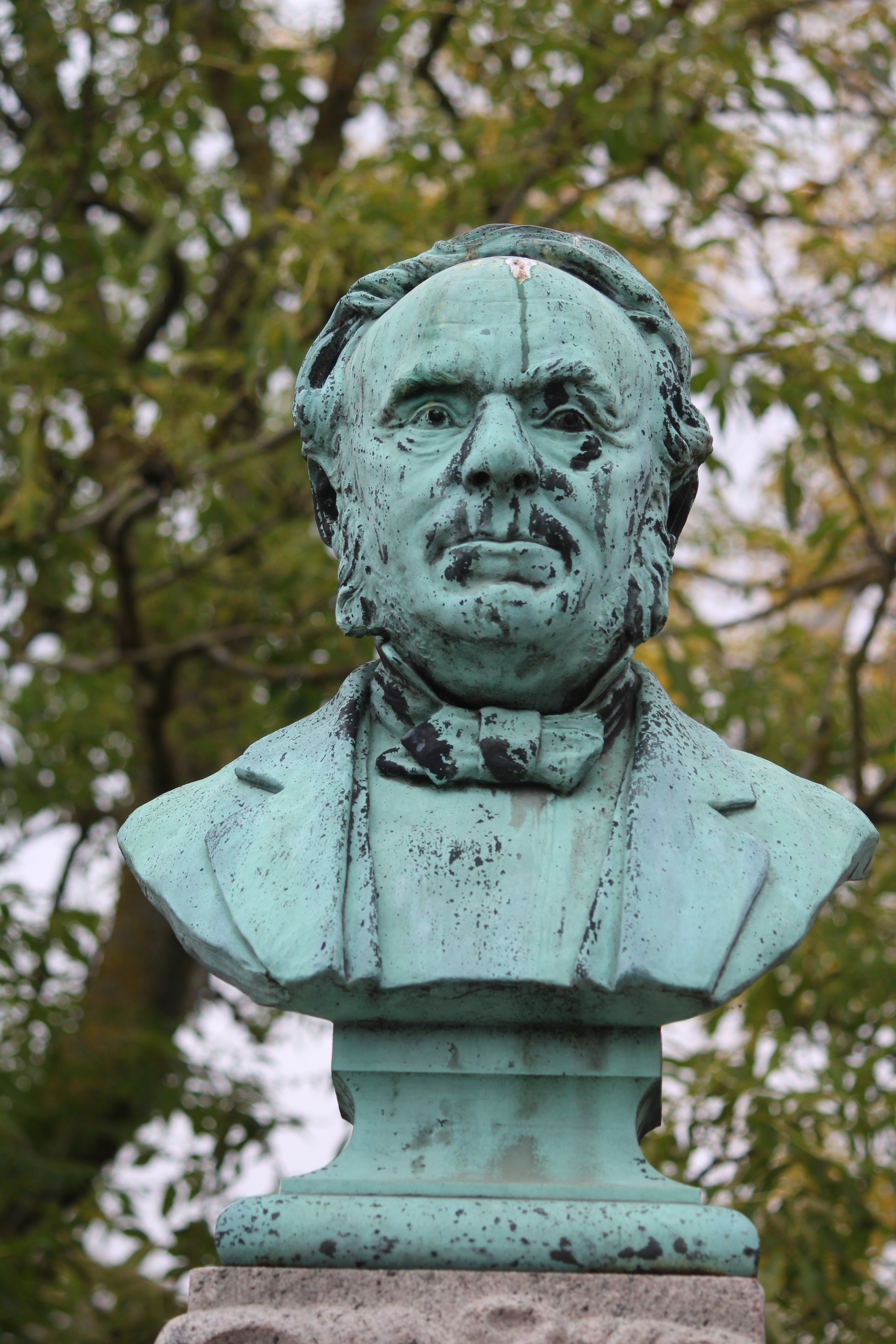
Bust in Copenhagen Zoo

Among his first work on birds was an 1828 manuscript, Forsøg til en Abbildning af Danske Sangfugle. His more famous works include Ornithologia danica, Danmarks Fugle (Birds of Denmark or "national birds"), produced during 1847–1852, and his collection titled Skandinaviens Fugle (Birds of Scandinavia) which are descriptions of birds accompanied by lithographed drawings of the birds on hand-coloured plates. His works became very popular and spread public interest in Danish birds and bird spotting.

In 1832 he married Christine Ploug-Nissen (died July 21, 1878). In 1847 he worked for the German baron Brockdorff at Tirsbæk. He began to work on birds after he obtained royal support. He received an honorary doctorate from the University of Jena in 1852. In 1859 he founded the Copenhagen Zoo in "Prinsess Vilhelmines Have" (The garden of Princess Vilhelmine) at Frederiksberg Palace which was given to him by the chief directorate of Copenhagen as recognition for his work. After his death the garden was inherited by his son Frederick Hugo Kjærbølling (1844-1904), who in 1872 handed it over to a company. He is buried at Frederiksberg Old Cemetery.
