= Ludwig von Kudriaffsky =

Austrian general, naval officer and diplomat

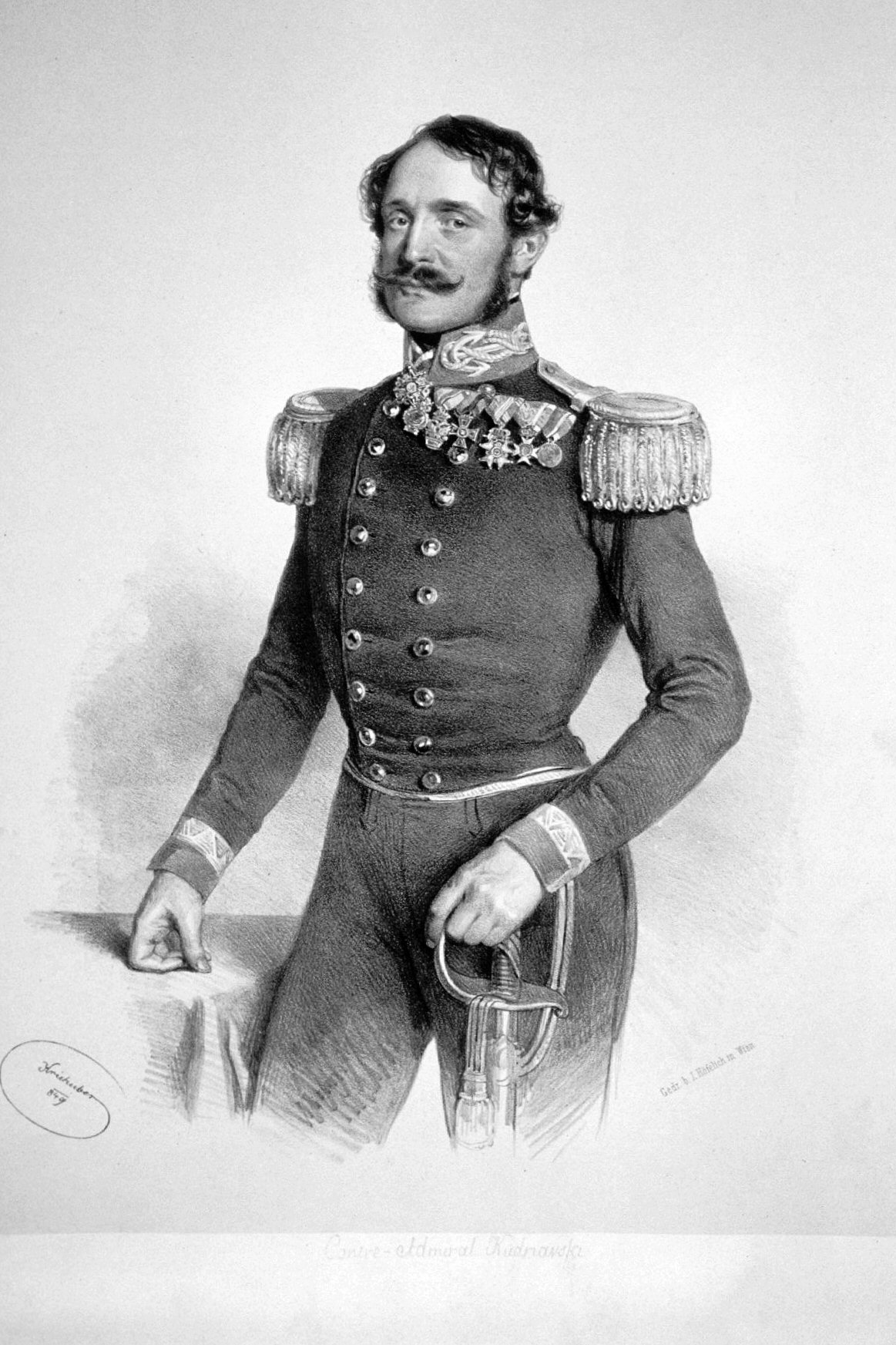
Ludwig von Kudriaffsky

Ludwig Freiherr von Kudriaffsky (21 March, 1805 in Vienna – 7 January, 1894 in Merano) was an Austrian general, naval officer and diplomat of Russian descent.

== Early life ==
Ludwig was the son of Emilian Kydriaffsky, a Russian general and director of the chancellery of the Ministry of Foreign Affairs of the Russian Empire and Louise Rainer, daughter of a merchant based in Venice. After being brought up in his father's home, he studied chemistry and physics in Vienna. In 1822 he joined the pontoon corps, where he was employed as a mathematics teacher. A trip to England sparked his interest in seafaring. In 1824 he joined the Imperial and Royal Navy.

When he joined the navy, he took part in the campaigns in the Levant against pirates from 1824 to 1828 and during the Greek War of Independence, and was an eyewitness to the destruction of the Turkish-Egyptian fleet by the combined French-English-Russian fleet at the battle of Navarino. In 1829 and 1830 he fought in the Austrian expedition against Morocco, carrying out a mission to free sixteen Austrian prisoners and to reconnoiter the strength of the Moroccan fortresses on the coast, where he was captured and threatened with a painful death, which he only escaped by chance. He was wounded in the battle of Larache. (Note: The source cited for most of the information here, Wurzbach's Biographisches Lexikon des Kaiserthums Oesterreich, gives the site of the battle as "Laroche". But this is certainly a reference to the Moroccan city Larache, where Kudriaffsky led a landing party.) After his recovery he was appointed adjutant to Vice-Admiral Count it: Silvestro Dandolo, with whom he remained in service until 1831.

In 1833 he accompanied Anton von Prokesch-Osten on a diplomatic mission to Egypt and Greece. In 1835, Kudriaffsky brought the news of the death of Emperor Francis II to the courts of Dresden, Berlin, and St. Petersburg, where he remained for half a year attached to the embassy headed by Count Ficquelmont. From 1837 he commanded various ships in the eastern Mediterranean as a lieutenant of the line. During this time he took part in the Syrian campaign, took possession of the island of Crete for the Grand Duke as commander of the brig Montecucoli after the capture of Acre, and brought Muhammad Ali’s nephews as hostages and their uncle’s act of submission to Constantinople. In 1840 he took part in the storming of Saida. In 1845/46 he was director of the naval college in Venice as a corvette captain. From 1846 to 1848 he worked as operations director of the Danube Steamship Company.

== Later career ==
In April 1848 he returned to the navy as a frigate captain and went to Trieste on behalf of the Imperial and Royal War Ministry to take command of the Imperial and Royal Fleet, which had been disbanded following the defection of most of its Italian officers and crew. In a very short time, he re-established order and was able to leave Pula with several ships at the end of April to blockade Venice. With only nine ships, he faced the combined Sardinian-Neapolitan-Venetian squadron of 21 sail. As the enemy fleet hesitated to attack, Kudriaffsky took advantage of darkness and successfully carried out a dangerous retreat to Trieste, thus saving the Imperial fleet, and securing Trieste from bombardment.

Later the same year he went to Frankfurt with Archduke Johann to organize a German fleet. After the failure of this project, he served as major general and brigadier in Zadar and Vienna in 1849. In 1851 he taught naval science to Archduke Ferdinand Maximilian. In 1856 he was appointed lieutenant field marshal. During the Second Italian War of Independence he was assigned to the Third Army in Italy, after the war he served as divisional commander in Zagreb and finally from 1860 to 1865 as president of the military appeals court in Vienna.

== Family life ==
Kudriaffsky married Johanna Baroness von Wiesenthau, with whom he had a daughter, Sidonia.

== Honours ==
Kudriaffsky received a number of honours during his career. He was made a privy councillor, and on 7 October 1859, he was elevated to the rank of baron.

Order of the Iron Crown (Austria)

Order of Glory (Ottoman Empire)

Order of Saint Stanislaus (Russia)

Order of Saint Vladimir (Russia)

Order of the Redeemer (Greece)

Order of the Sword (Sweden)
