= Niels Peter Holbech =

Danish portrait painter

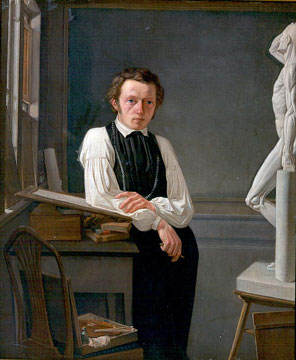
Portrait of Niels Peter Holbech (1830), by Wilhelm Bendz

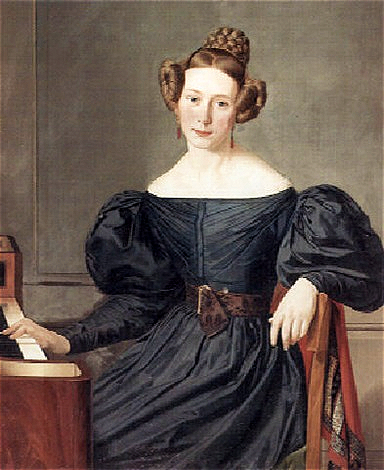
Portrait of his future wife, Caroline Gamborg (1834)

Niels Peter Holbech (14 September 1804 - 11 January 1889) was a Danish portrait painter.

== Biography ==
Holbech was born on board the Maria Constantia, en route from Calcutta to Copenhagen. His father was a sailing master whose family often travelled with him. During the Gunboat War, the ship they were on was seized by the British and they spent two years as prisoners of war.

At the age of fifteen, he entered the Royal Danish Academy of Fine Arts and, in 1824, became a student at the Academy's Model School (Modelskolen). His primary instructors were Christian August Lorentzen and Christoffer Wilhelm Eckersberg. Later in 1824, however, he broke off his studies to become private secretary to British Ambassador, Sir Augustus Foster, with whom the family had become acquainted during their captivity.

After a brief stay in London, he accompanied Foster to Turin, following Foster's appointment as Ambassador to the Kingdom of Sardinia. In 1830, he left to go to Rome and resume his career as a painter. He applied to the Royal Academy for financial support but, despite a recommendation from Bertel Thorvaldsen, did not receive any. In 1834, he returned to Copenhagen and was able to start a drawing school. It was short-lived, however, as he gave it up when he found sufficient work painting portraits.

In 1836, he married Caroline Louise Amalie Gamborg (1809-1873). She was the daughter of Anders Gamborg, who was a professor of philosophy at Copenhagen University. They were the parents of the businesswoman and inventor, Ursula Dahlerup.

He rarely exhibited. In addition to portraits, he created a few historical scenes that were purchased for the Royal Collection. In 1888, he received some commissions from Sweden and died there in Karlshamn early the following year.
