= Ursula Dahlerup =

Danish entrepreneur

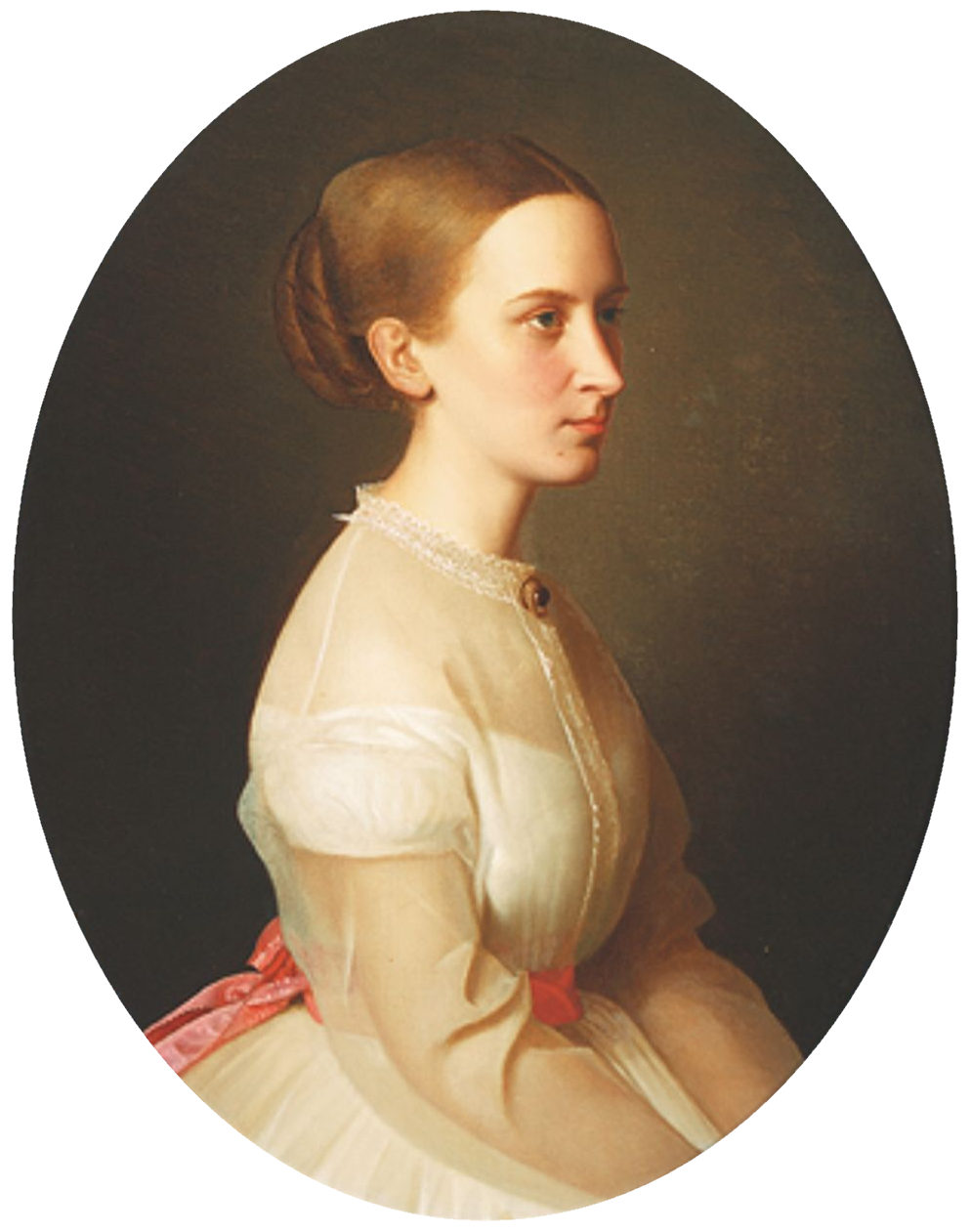
Ursula Dahlerup; portrait by her father (c. 1869)

Baroness Ursula Signe Sophie Dahlerup, née Holbech (5 October 1840, Copenhagen – 25 September 1925, Charlottenlund) was a Danish entrepreneur, known for "Baroness Dahlerup's Patent Mattress".

== Life and work ==
She was born to the painter, Niels Peter Holbech, and his wife, Caroline Louise Amalie Gamborg, daughter of the philosopher Anders Gamborg. From an early age, she wanted to pursue a career in music or art, but her father, who was very traditional, insisted that she become a wife and mother. In 1869, she married Baron Hans Joost Vilhelm Dahlerup, a lawyer at the Ministry of Finance. They had three children. Their first-born son, Hans, an aspiring sculptor, committed suicide in Paris at the age of twenty.

After becoming a widow, she found herself free to pursue her interests, and took courses at a drawing school for women. Rather than create artwork, however, she designed an incinerating toilet that was exhibited at the Industrial Association. By 1893, she was participating in the World's Columbian Exposition in Chicago, where she recreated an old Danish farmhouse and won several awards. Inspired by the charitable homes for women and children that she saw there, she campaigned for similar homes when she returned to Denmark, but was met with indifference.

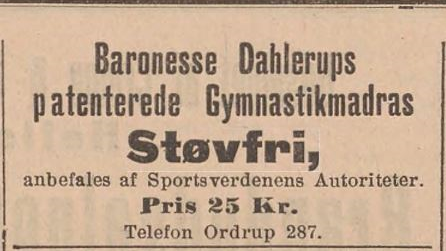
Advert for Ursula Dahlerup's cotton mattresses

Of more importance, ultimately, was her observation that immigrants who used down mattresses often became ill; apparently from the cotton padding. After some experimentation, she created a padding that could be washed and disinfected. She was awarded a patent for it, established a mattress factory in 1896, and chose the brand name "Hygieta". It proved to be a success, and she was able to sign contracts with several hospitals. By 1902, she had acquired sufficient funds to open her own home for impoverished women. By 1914, she had been awarded six more patents, including one for a temporary reed-based mattress.

Her original mattress was in production until 1965. Some disorganized writings she had left behind were edited and published as her memoirs in 1989; by her great-grandchildren Ulla and Bent.
