= Villa Webber =

Historic house in Sardinia, Italy

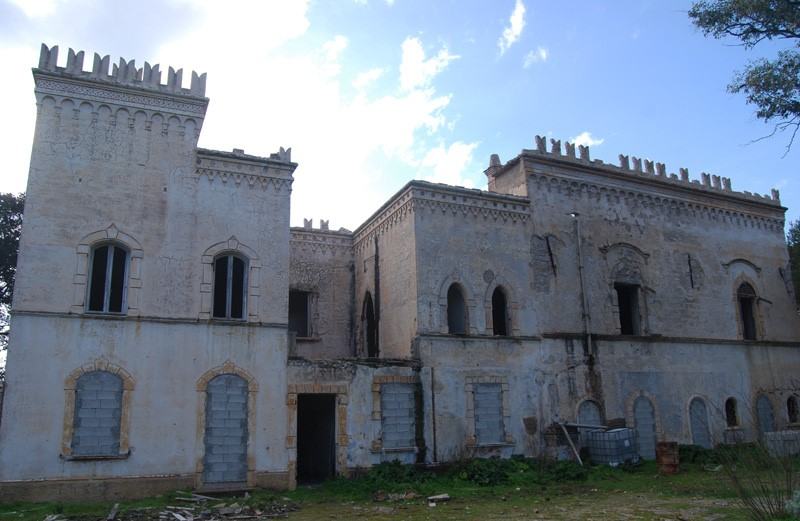
- Villa Webber (La Maddalena): Sardinia
- Interactive map of the Villa Webber area

General information
- Type: Villa/Museum
- Architectural style: Moorish
- Location: Sardinia, Italy, Via Padule 60, Italy
- Coordinates: 41°12′59″N 9°23′32″E
- Current tenants: Uninhabitated
- Construction started: 1855
- Completed: 1857
- Client: James Phillipps Webber
- Owner: James Phillipps Webber

Technical details
- Floor area: 80.000 m³

Design and construction
- Architect: Unknown

Villa Webber is a 19th century Moorish-style villa located in the Padule region on the island of La Maddalena, in northern Sardinia. It was built on the highest point of the archipelago by James Philipps Webber between 1855 and 1857. It was inhabited by James Webber's family until 1928. In 1943, it was turned into a place of imprisonment for Benito Mussolini. Villa Webber is currently in a state of neglect.

== History ==
=== Origins of building ===
In the early 1800s, Baron Giorgio Andrea Agnès Des Geneys bought land in Padule, south of La Maddalena, from a "patron" named Francesco Santucci and built a house there. The land and two small neighbouring plots included a vineyard of more than 4,000 vines, a vegetable garden, and enclosures for livestock. Upon the baron's death, the property was sold to a traveling Englishman, Sir Hyde Parker, and subsequently to another Englishman, James Phillips Webber. The latter expanded the estate and built his villa on it, which was named Villa Webber.

=== James Phillips Webber ===
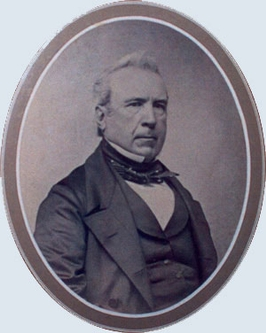
Villa Webber (La Maddalena): A portrait of James Phillips Webber

James Phillips Webber, after whom the villa was named, was born in Overton, Flintshire, Wales, on the 27th of July 1797, the first of three sons. His father Edward, was a career army officer who attained the rank of Lieutenant General. James's mother, Charlotte Margaret Phillips, married Edward in 1789. She was descended from Dutch colonists who emigrated to North America in the early 17th century and settled in Yonkers, near New Amsterdam, present-day New York. When the English took those lands from the Dutch, the Phillipse family stayed in the place and integrated with the victors. Charlotte's great-grandfather, Frederick Phillipse, amassed a large fortune, having obtained extensive land grants from King William and Queen Mary II of England in 1693.

In 1821, James Webber sailed from London to try his luck in the colony of New South Wales. He acquired a significant land grant in Tocal, near Newcastle and held important public offices, including that of local magistrate. Webber was one of the pioneers of the wine industry in Australia, and the mounds of his vineyard are still visible at Tocal. In 1834 he sent vine cuttings from Tocal to George Wyndham's vineyard at Dalwood, which in the 20th century became the well-known Wyndham Estate winery. Webber's library at Tocal held one of the largest private book collections in the colony. After Webber sold Tocal in 1834 he established his main residence in Italy and became a successful merchant who traveled widely. In 1850 Webber settled on the island of La Maddalena, where he built the villa.

He died in Pisa, Italy in 1877, and bequeathed his estate to Maria Tamponi, wife of Webber's adopted son Luigi Alfonso Russo Webber, along with their four children. Following Maria's death in 1928, the heirs were unable to sell the villa.

=== "The Lost Library" ===
James Webber built a library in Villa Webber which included valuable books, mainly comprising the works of French, Italian and English poets. The library was considered a place to study and became a local landmark. It gained more prestige when, in the 19th century, the phenomena of the "Grand Tour" became popular. One of the most famous visitors was Daniel Roberts. After Webber's death, all the books were lost, along with his works of art and furnishings. Because of the mystery behind the disappearance of such items, the library is known as "The Lost Library of Villa Webber".

List of books in James Webber's library at Villa Webber

=== Mussolini's imprisonment ===
In 1943, Villa Webber was turned into a place of detention for military needs. After his arrest, Benito Mussolini was imprisoned at the villa from the 7th to the 27th of August 1943. Mussolini's arrest took place on the 25th of July 1943, by decision of the Grand Council of Fascism. After a short period of imprisonment in Ponza, he was transferred to Villa Webber, in La Maddalena. Mussolini had previously visited La Maddalena three times (June 10, 1923; May 10, 1935; May 10, 1942). After his imprisonment in Villa Webber, Mussolini was moved to Gran Sasso, where he was then liberated by the German allies.

==== Mussolini's arrival ====
Mussolini's arrival at Villa Webber took place on the 7th of August,1943 at 3:30 pm. The journey from Ponza to La Maddalena was by sea on the destroyer FR 22, known as "Pantera", and lasted approximately 12 hours. Mussolini arrived on the island escorted by Admiral Carlo Maugeri, Lieutenant Colonel of the Carabinieri Meoli, Captain Di Lorenzo, Marshal Osvaldo Antichi and a large quantity of policemen.

==== Isolation ====
Approximately one hundred people were involved in Mussolini's imprisonment at Villa Webber. The local authorities and the military devised a plan to isolate and guard the Villa to conceal Mussolini's presence from the local population. During the first few days, the former dictator of Italy was often seen walking around the villa and having coffee in local cafes, leading to the news of his imprisonment at the Villa to spread quickly. Within days of Mussolini's arrival, crowds formed in order to get a glimpse of the prisoner, controlled by hundreds of policemen stationed there. To prevent further publicity Mussolini was forced into isolation at the Villa, and the radio station and telephone line that had been built for him were disconnected.

There were only a few exceptions to people who visited Mussolini in Villa Webber: the doctors Francesco Savarese and Stefano Castagna, the parish priest Salvatore Capula, and Maria Pedoli, who was in charge of washing his clothes and bringing the food. Mussolini would occasionally receive visits from Inspector Saverio Polito, who would bring him letters from his wife and update him on developments regarding the war, bombardments of Italian cities and on the political climate in Italy. Mussolini was also clandestinely in contact with other people, from whom he received information from outside.

==== Health ====
During his imprisonment at the villa, Mussolini's ongoing health issues worsened: he suffered from depression, and his stomach ulcer disease had become acute. His health conditions were being monitored by the Maritime Military Hospital when on the 10th of August 1943, the doctor Stafano Castagna prescribed him a special treatment and a special diet; Mussolini could have only fruit, eggs, tomatoes and milk. Two weeks after this prescription, on the 27th of August, Mussolini's condition further deteriorated and he was taken from the island by a first aid plane.

==== Mussolini's departure ====
During Mussolini's imprisonment in Villa Webber, the German dictator Adolf Hitler was devising a plan to free and return him to power. Hitler learned of the location and some details of his imprisonment, like the number of guards surrounding Villa Webber, from a note that Mussolini had written to Dr Aldo Chirico. The note was dated August 16. The Germans flew over the villa to inspect the location in the following days, probably on the 17th or the 18th of August. This led to Italian suspicions, and they began to plan for Mussolini's transfer from the island. The decision to move Mussolini was finally taken on the 27th or the 28th of August when the second plane, possibly carrying Otto Skorzeny, flew over La Maddalena.

On August 27, 1943, Mussolini was informed of his departure by the new head of security, Lieutenant Alberto Faiola, Meoli's replacement. Before leaving, he recorded in his diary that he thanked the people who helped him during the period of incarceration, including Dr. Chirico; the only one who was not thanked in person was Don Capula, to whom Mussolini left a note. He was then escorted to a seaplane that took him to Vigna di Valle where he was confined to Hotel Campo Imperatore on the Gran Sasso, where he remained a prisoner until September 12, 1943, when the Germans succeeded in rescuing him in Operation Eiche.

=== 1943 to present ===
In later years, the villa was abandoned. The building is currently off-limits to visitors and in a poor state of preservation, although it retains much of its original finishing. The most valuable removable architectural elements, such as the fireplaces, have been stolen, but there are still elements of value, such as the flooring, some painted ceilings, some original fixtures, the banisters, and railings of a decorated wrought-iron staircase.

== Arson attack ==
In 1865, the Webber pine forest near the villa was almost completely destroyed in an arson attack. The trial registered at the court in Tempio and at the Sassari Assize Court, to provide means to reconstruct the story.

=== Accusation against Berretta ===
In a complaint to the prosecutor of 1865, Webber states that his suspicions fell on Natale Berretta and his son Antonio. The legal disputes between the Webber and Berretta families had been numerous. As a young adolescent, Berretta was sent to Spargi to learn the art of trading. While on the deserted island, he focused on agriculture by fencing off certain areas of land, which allowed him to establish exclusive ownership of almost the entire island. Natale owned land in La Maddalena adjacent to Webber's. There were frequent disputes arising from this proximity. During the trial, Webber reported to the judge that Battista Olivieri and his son Pietro claimed to have seen a man starting the fire in the pine forest on the night of the incident, and that they identified the man as Natale Berretta. The attorney general in Cagliari indicated Berretta and ordered his capture. Berretta escaped, and the legend of the bandit Berretta hiding on the island of Spargi was born. After more than a year as a fugitive, Natale turned himself in at Sassari Prison. He was armed with a defence and witnesses willing to challenge the testimony of the two Olivieri. There is no trace in the court documents of the participation of the two Olivieri in the trial, who were not even cited despite being the key witnesses who had led to Berretta's indictment. In 1869, the jurors ordered Berretta's immediate release. Webber and his adopted son remained steadfast in the face of all Magdalenian public opinion, while the two Olivieri were accused of madness.

== Architecture style ==
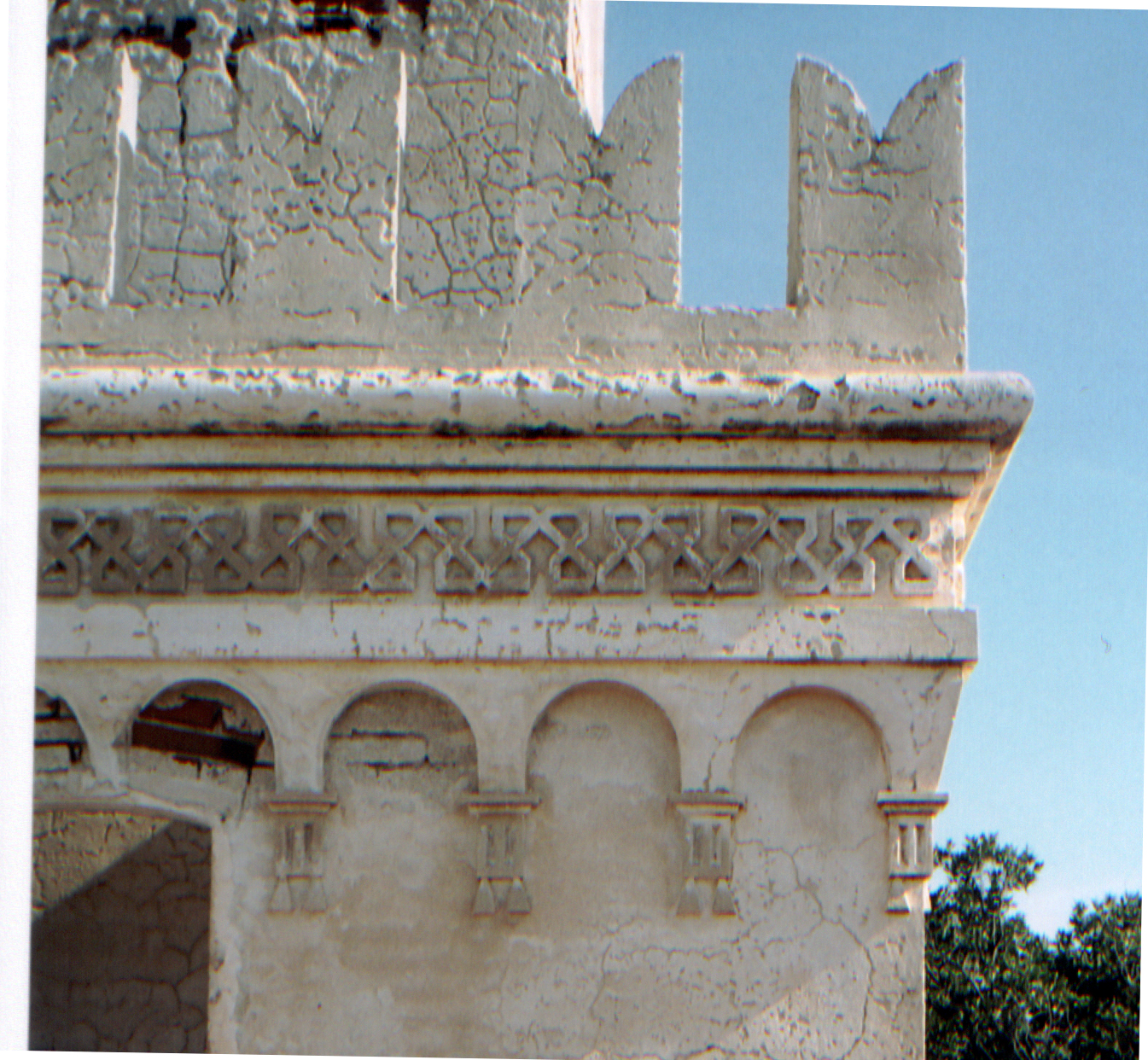
Villa Webber, La Maddalena: cornice left-hand side.

Villa Webber was built in the early 1800s in a Moorish style. It was initially built as a fortress, surrounded by walls of thick stone, of which some reached 7 meters in height. The Villa has multiple rooms, arched windows, lancet arches and a view of the sea around La Maddalena.

Over two floors, the villa has a total area of 80 000 meters cubed, of which 55 000 consisted of rooms and living areas and the remaining 25 000 meters cubed, were utilized as hotel accommodation for guests. The ground floor held a dining area, with kitchen and rooms for the servants of the villa, while the second and top floor had a separate dining room, with over 20 paintings, a library and living accommodations for guests.

== Garden and surroundings ==
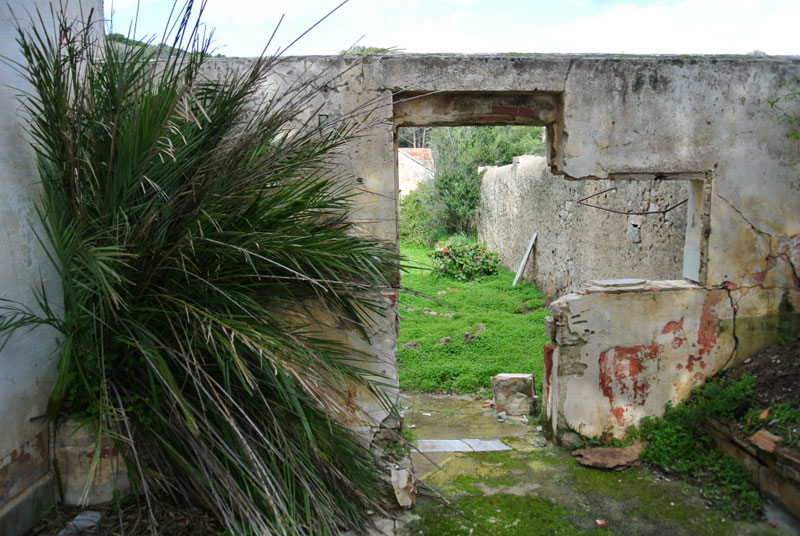
Villa Webber (La Maddalena): Garden door

The villa is surrounded by a large garden, originally filled with plants from all over the world, from James Webber's travels. In 1882, the garden was described as containing: two citrus fruit gardens; four square areas for winter agriculture; an area for fruit plants; an olive grove; and, wild pine trees. The villa also had a channeling system which was connected to a large reservoir which held thousands of hectolitres, which still survives. Of the original garden and plants there remains century old trees, junipers, holm oaks, olive trees, pines and typical Mediterranean plants.

== Photo Gallery ==
Pictures of Villa Webber
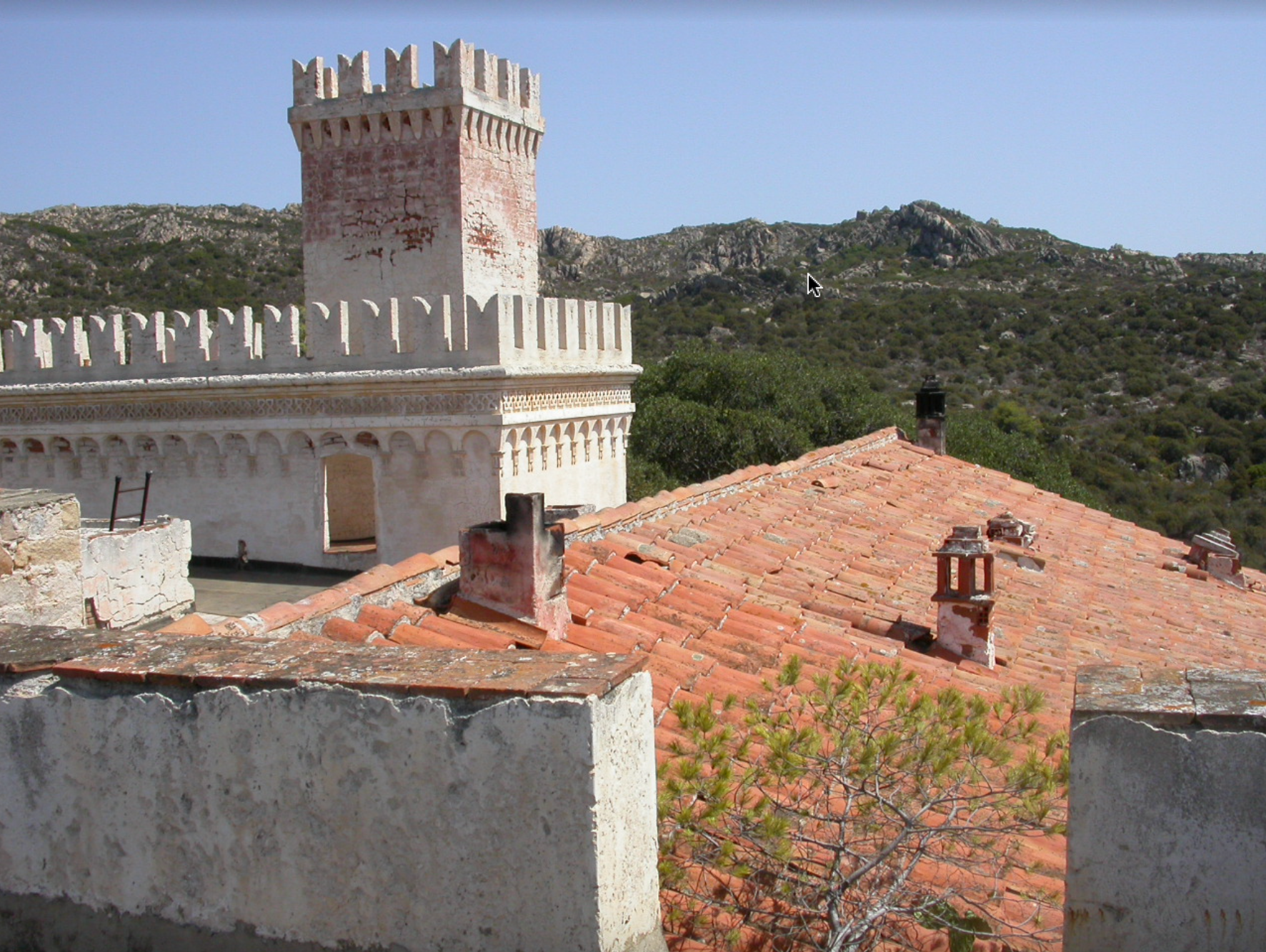
Villa Webber (La Maddalena): Roof of the villa

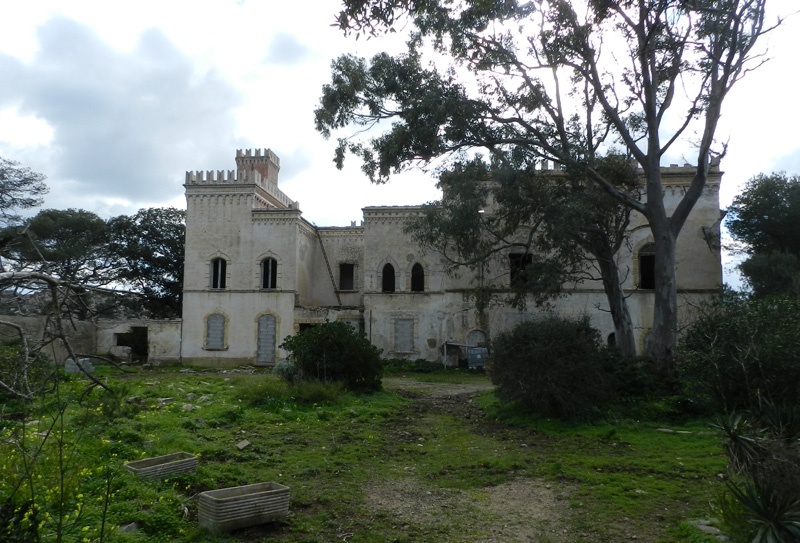
Villa Webber (La Maddalena): Front side

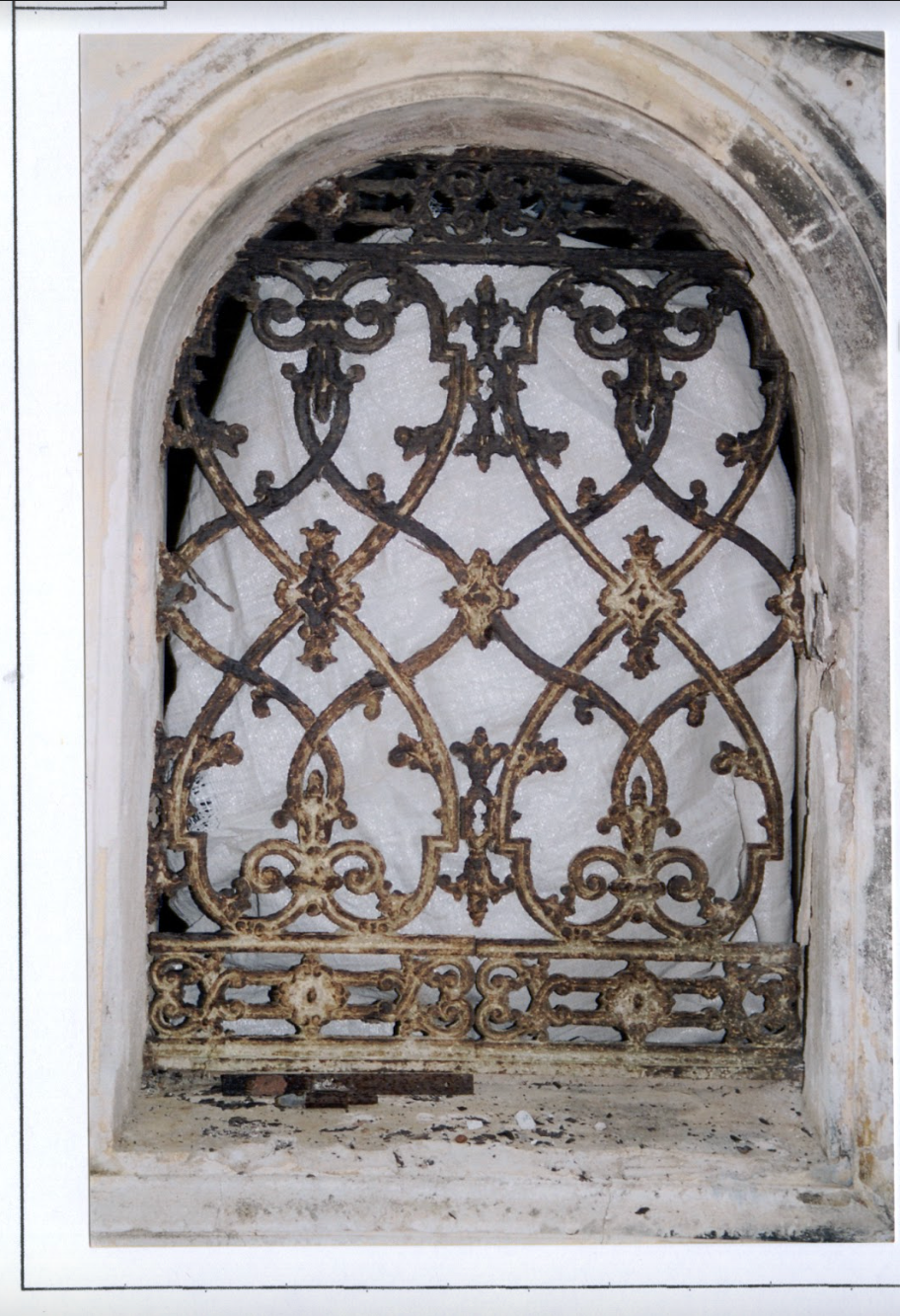
Villa Webber (La Maddalena): Grating on the ground floor

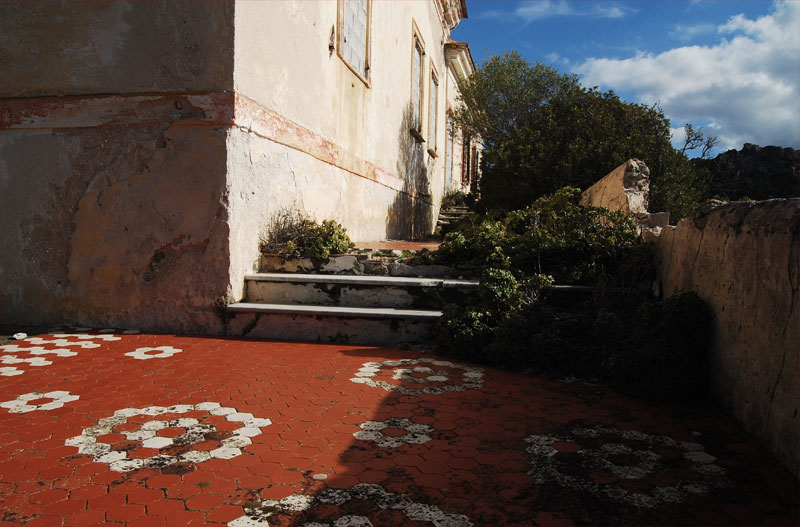
Villa Webber (La Maddalena): External floor

== See also ==
- World War II

== Bibliography ==
- Sotgiu, Giovanna; Sega, Alberto (2018). Un'isola e il suo ammiraglio [An island and its admiral]. Sorba, It: P. Sorba. ISBN 978-8875380267.
- Sotgiu, Giovanna (2019). Spargi. Sorba. ISBN 978-8875381349.
- Annussek, Greg (2009). Hachette Books (ed.). Hitler's raid to Save Mussolini. Hachette+ORM. ISBN 9780786735716.
- River, Charles (July 2, 2021). The Gran Sasso Raid (3rd ed.). Charles River Editors. ISBN 9798531212603.
- Williamson, Gordon (2012). German Special Forces of World War II. Bloomsbury. ISBN 9781849081368.
- The Italian Campaign of World War II. CreateSpace Independent Publish Platform. 2016. ISBN 9781537335827.
- H. Stevens, Marc (2011). The best POW escape books of World War 2. Pen & Sword. ISBN 978-1848845541.
- Fincke, Gary (2020). Mussolini diaries. Serving House Books. ISBN 978-1947175297.
- Milligan, Spike (1980). Mussolini: His Part In My Downfall. Penguin UK. ISBN 978-0140051964.
