= Dalwood (disambiguation) =

Dalwood is a village and civil parish in Devon, England. Dalwood may also refer to:

== People ==
- Dalwood (surname)

== Places ==
Australia

- Dalwood, New South Wales (Ballina Shire)
- Dalwood, New South Wales (Singleton Council)

== Other ==
- Dalwood House, heritage-listed homestead and house museum in Branxton, New South Wales, Australia
