= Giorgio des Geneys =

Royal Sardinian Navy officer

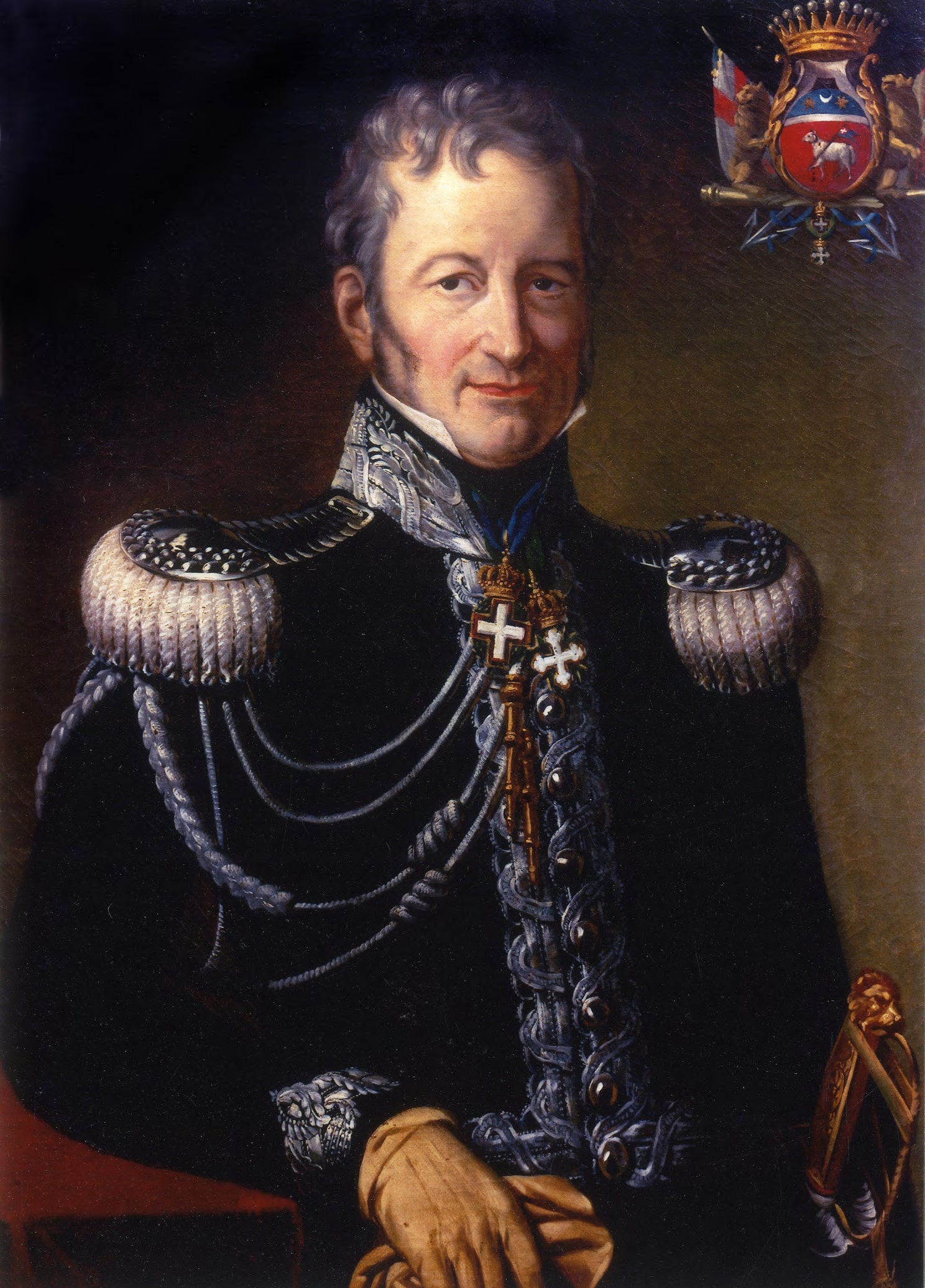
Giorgio des Geneys

Giorgio Andrea Agnès des Geneys (29 April 1761 – 8 January 1839) was a Royal Sardinian Navy officer.

== Military career ==
Giorgio Andrea Agnès des Geneys was the son of Giovanni Agnès des Geneys, baron of Fenile and Mathie and Cristina Boutal, countess of Pinasca. He was born in the Upper Susa Valley.

At the age of 12 he was enlisted as ensign in the Royal Navy of the Kingdom of Sardinia. In 1794, in a skirmish with the French near the Hyères Islands, he was taken prisoner and did not regain his freedom until 1796, after the Armistice of Cherasco. In 1798, he defended the city of Oneglia, of which he was military commander, for six months against the troops of the French client Ligurian Republic.
He resumed his post during the Austro-Russian occupation of Piedmont, but, following the Battle of Marengo (1800), he was forced to retreat to the island of Sardinia, where he was placed in charge of the island's naval forces.

With the rank of rear admiral, he was entrusted with the defense of the island, the target of continuous incursions by African corsairs, particularly following the departure of Nelson's English fleet from the Mediterranean. The most important feat of arms in which the small Sardinian fleet engaged in those years, was the victorious battle of Capo Malfatano (1811) against a pirate fleet.

Aftert the Congress of Vienna (1815), the Republic of Genoa, with its important naval tradition, was incorporated into the Kingdom of Sardinia. The next year, as vice-admiral, des Geneys was appointed governor of Genoa and held supreme command of the Sardinian navy, which he rebuilt on new foundations. Among other things, he founded the naval school of Genoa (1817) for the training of officers.

In 1825, he organised the successful Expedition against the Barbary pirates of Tripoli, led by Captain Francesco Sivori. He was appointed rear-admiral in 1826, and knight of the Supreme Order of the Most Holy Annunciation in 1835.

Des Geneys is considered the true founder of the Sardinian Navy, the precursor of the Italian Marina Militare.
