= La Maddalena =

La Maddalena Sa Madalena (Sardinian) A Madalena (Corsican)
- Comune
- Comune di La Maddalena
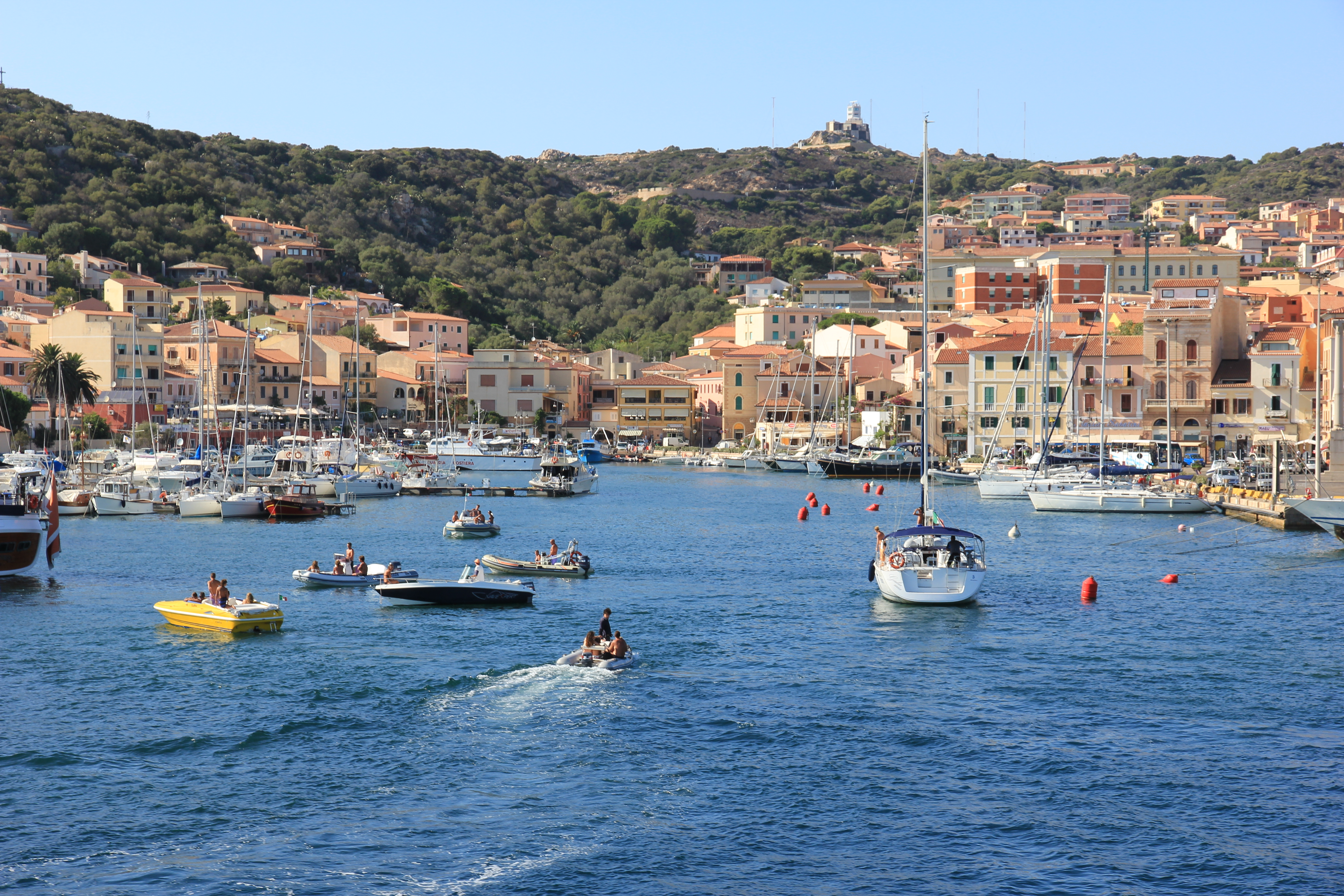
- View of La Maddalena

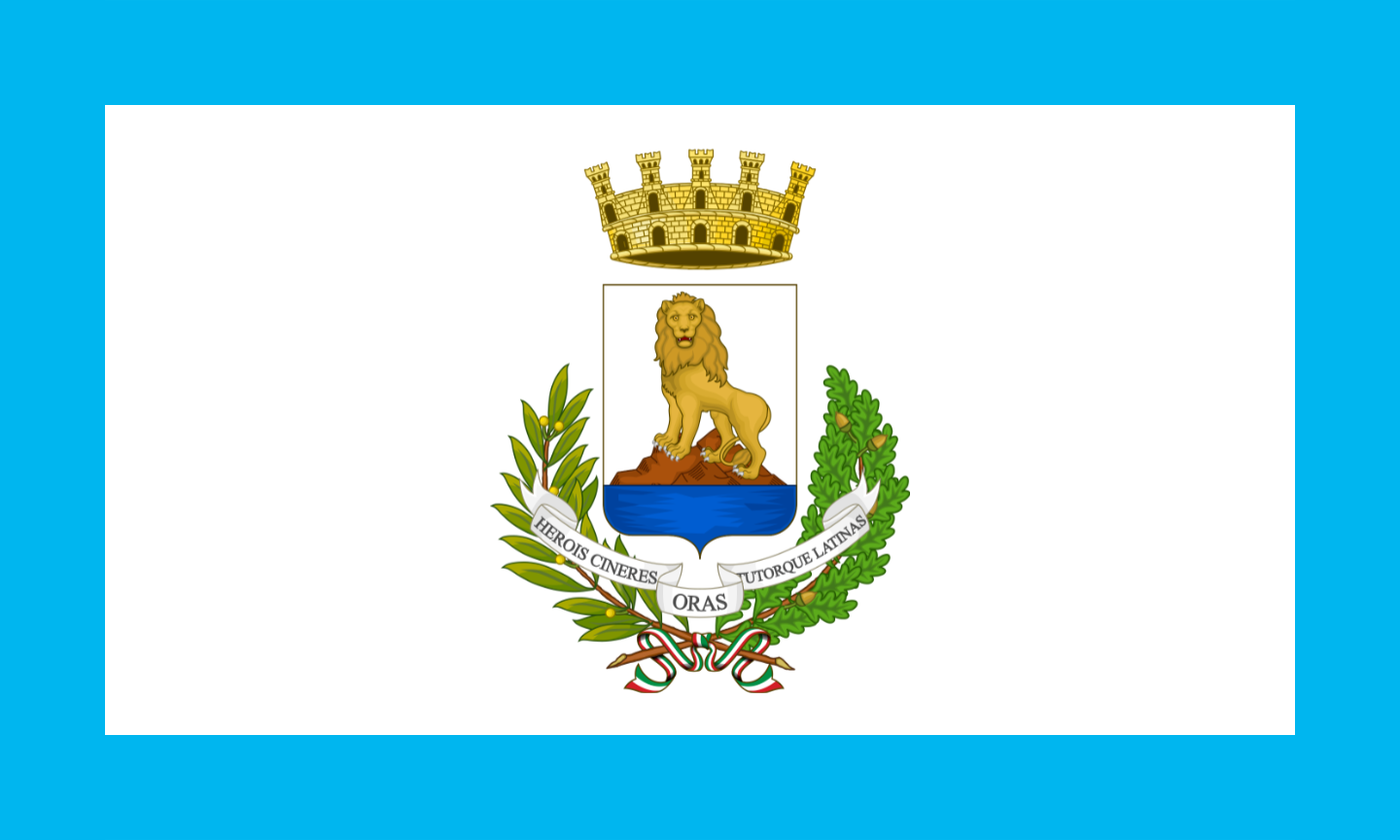
- Flag Coat of arms

- Location within Sardinia Location within Italy
- Coordinates: 41°12′55″N 9°24′25″E
- Country: Italy
- Region: Sardinia
- Province: Gallura North-East Sardinia
- Frazioni: Moneta, Stagnali

Government
  - Mayor: Fabio Lai

Area
  - Total: 52.01 km^{2} (20.08 sq mi)
- Elevation: 27 m (89 ft)

Population (2026)
  - Total: 10,449
  - Density: 200.9/km^{2} (520.3/sq mi)
- Demonym: Maddalenini
- Time zone: UTC+1 (CET)
  - Summer (DST): UTC+2 (CEST)
- Postal code: 07020, 07024
- Dialing code: 0789
- Patron saint: St. Mary Magdalene
- Saint day: July 22
- Website: Official website

La Maddalena (Sardinian: Sa Madalena, Corsican: A Madalena) is a town and comune (municipality) located on the islands of the Maddalena archipelago in the Province of Gallura North-East Sardinia in the autonomous island region of Sardinia in Italy. It has 10,449 inhabitants.

It is one of I Borghi più belli d'Italia ("The most beautiful villages of Italy").

== History ==
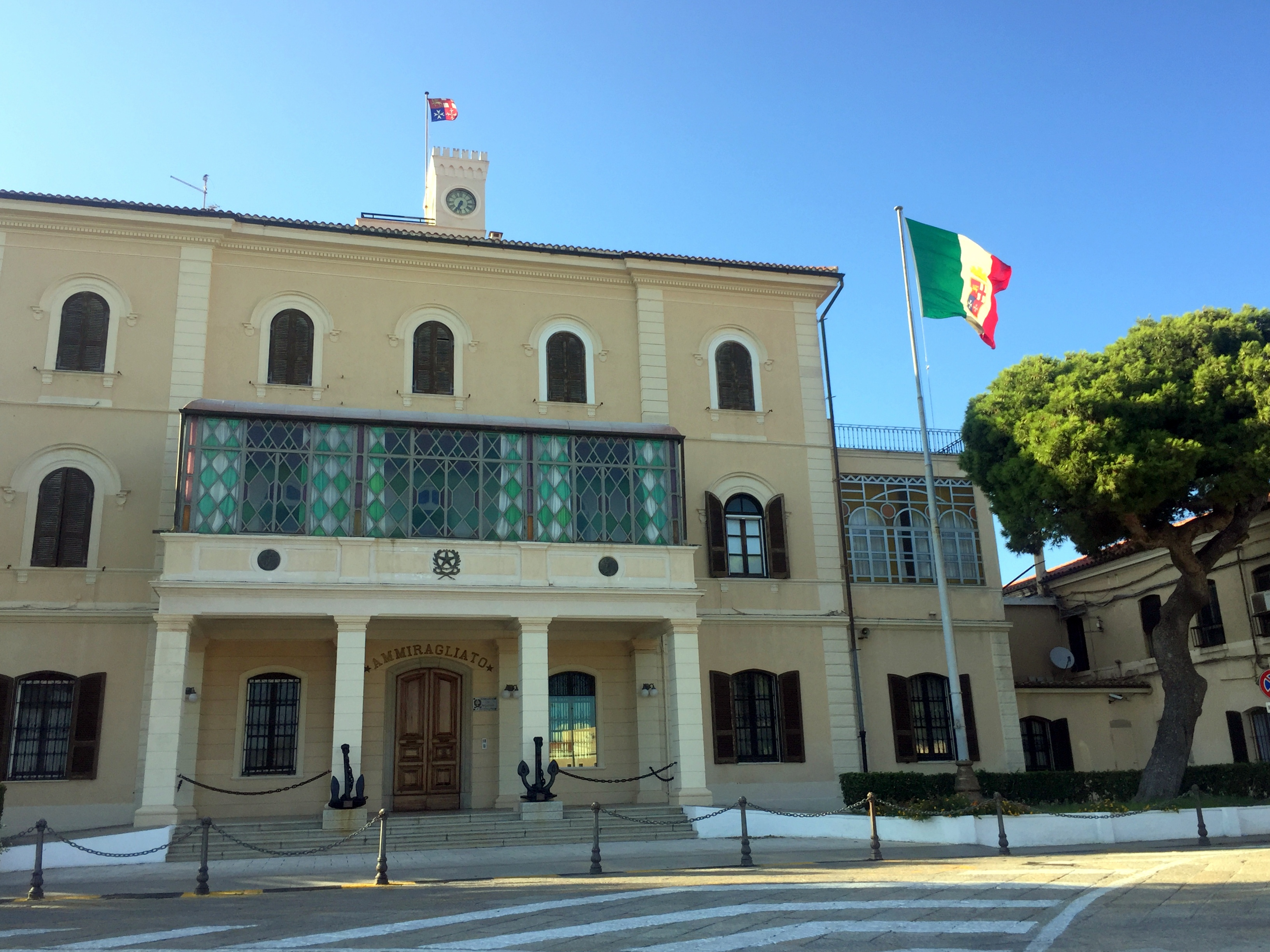
The seat of the Admiralty.

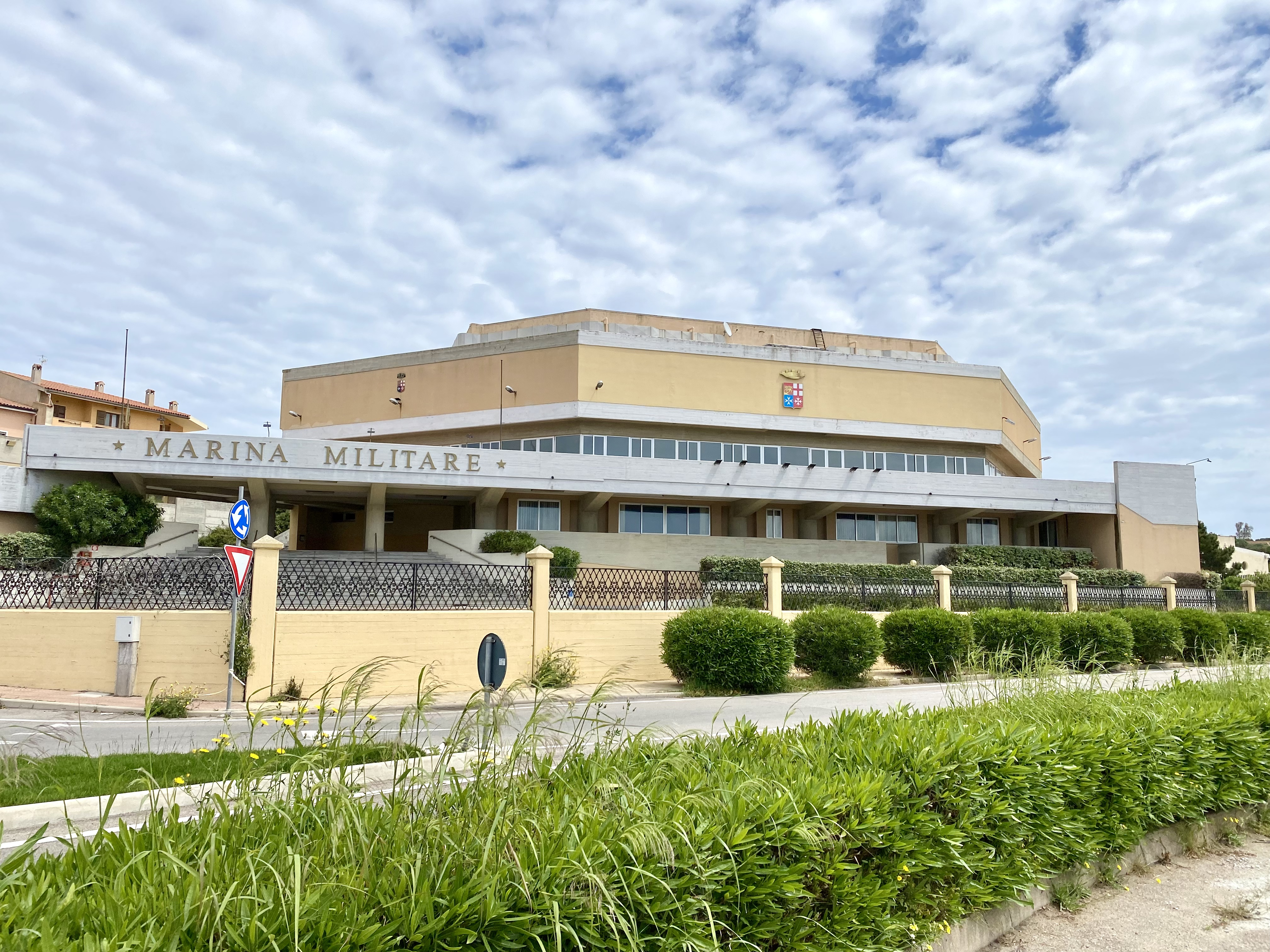
Petty Officer School of the Italian Navy.

La Maddalena has undergone many name changes: the Romans named it Ilva, Fussa and Bucina and in the Middle Ages the island was known as "Bicinara" before being given the name of Santa Maria Magdalena in the 16th century. After this it finally became known as La Maddalena.

The Maddalena archipelago is known from archaeological evidence to have been occupied in prehistoric times, but its written history begins with the Roman Empire.

After the fall of the Western Roman Empire the islands were completely abandoned until the 12th century, when they were chosen by Benedictine monks founding small communities there. The islands were the object of a dispute between the Republics of Pisa and Genoa in the 12th century.

In 1584, all the monasteries on the islands were destroyed by one of the Ottoman raids. In the 17th century shepherds began to bring their flocks to the islands in the winter months.

Its location in the Strait of Bonifacio, through which much maritime traffic must pass, turned the archipelago into a strategic military position. In 1767 it was occupied by the Savoy-Piedmontese. The nucleus of the present town of La Maddalena emerged then.

In 1793, a French expedition, in which Napoleon Bonaparte took part, unsuccessfully tried to occupy the island. It was the first combat experience of Napoleon Bonaparte. During all the Napoleonic Wars Admiral Horatio Nelson used the archipelago of La Maddalena as a base for his fleet in actions against the French.

A base was established here by the Italian Regia Marina (Royal Navy) in 1887. In 1943, during World War II, Benito Mussolini was briefly held prisoner here: his imprisonment took place in Villa Webber from 7 to 27 August.

The former Naval Arsenal at the Moneta locality was planned to host the 35th G8 Summit in 2009, which later was moved to L'Aquila.

== Geography ==
The La Maddalena comune covers all the territory of the La Maddalena archipelago including the islands: Barrettini, Barettinelli, Bisce, Budelli, Camizie, Cappuccini, Caprera, Chiesa, Colombo, Corcelli, Delle Bocche, Italiani, Le Camere, Nibani, Maddalena, Monaci, Mortorio, Pecora, Piana, Porco, Porro, Presa, Razzoli, Santa Maria, Santo Stefano, Soffi, Spargi and Spargiotto.

=== The town ===
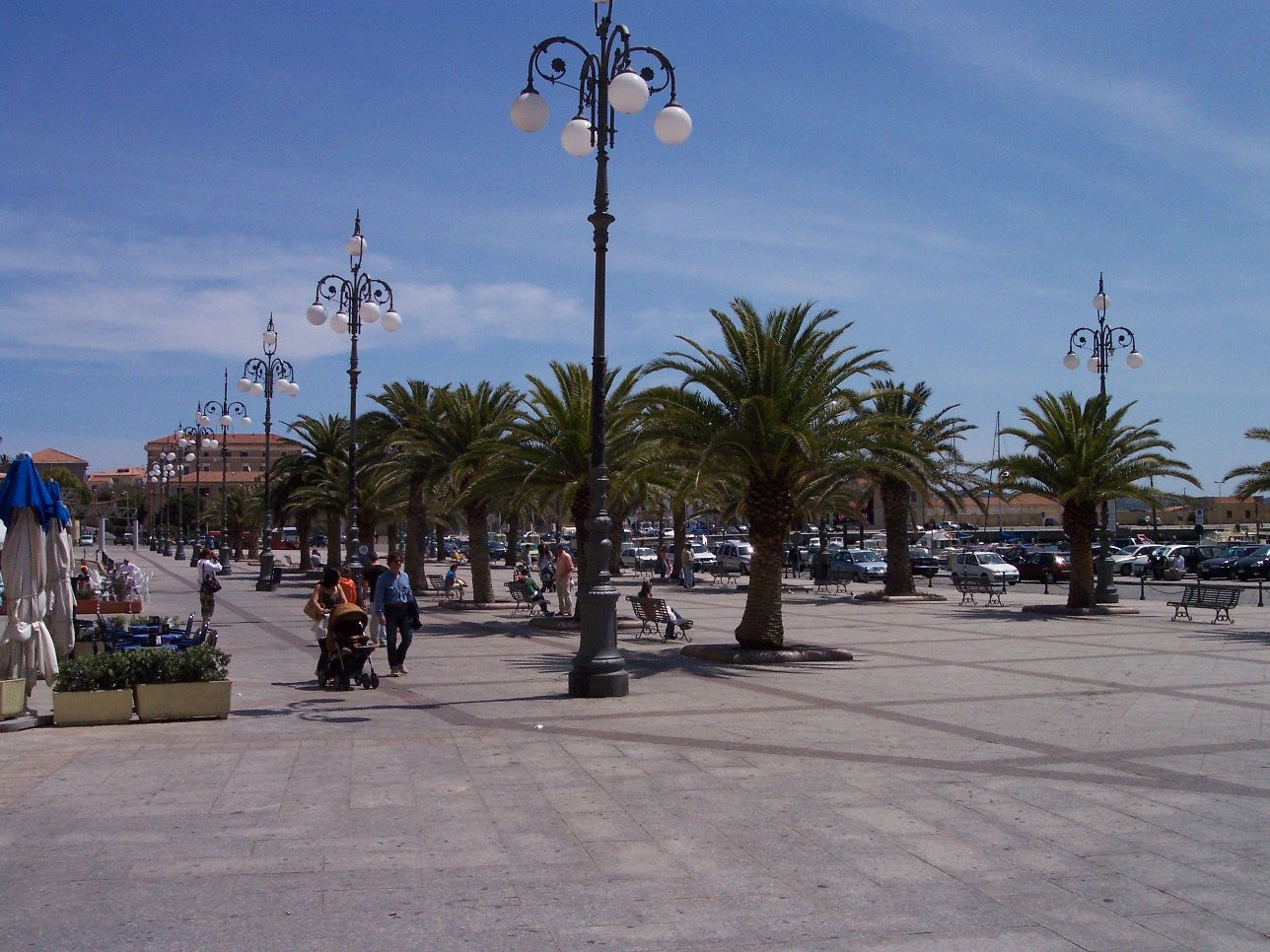
Piazza Comando in La Maddalena.

La Maddalena is the largest town in the Maddalena archipelago, just 2 kilometres (1 mile) from the northeastern shore of Sardinia and sitting in the Strait of Bonifacio, between it and Corsica.

Church of La Maddalena

The focal-point of pedestrian activity is around Piazza Umberto I (formerly known as Piazza Comando-the older generation of natives in town still commonly refer to the piazza by its original name). There is an adjacent via (Garibaldi) that connects the port (Banchina Commerciale I) facing the Island of Santo Stefano and Piazza Umberto I with city hall. Via Garibaldi is surrounded by commercial shops, restaurants, and bars.

La Maddalena now derives much of its income from tourism. The only method of traveling to La Maddalena is by boat, with car ferries travelling from nearby Palau in Sardinia.

The natives of La Maddalena speak a Sardo-Corsican dialect known as Maddalenino.

=== The island ===
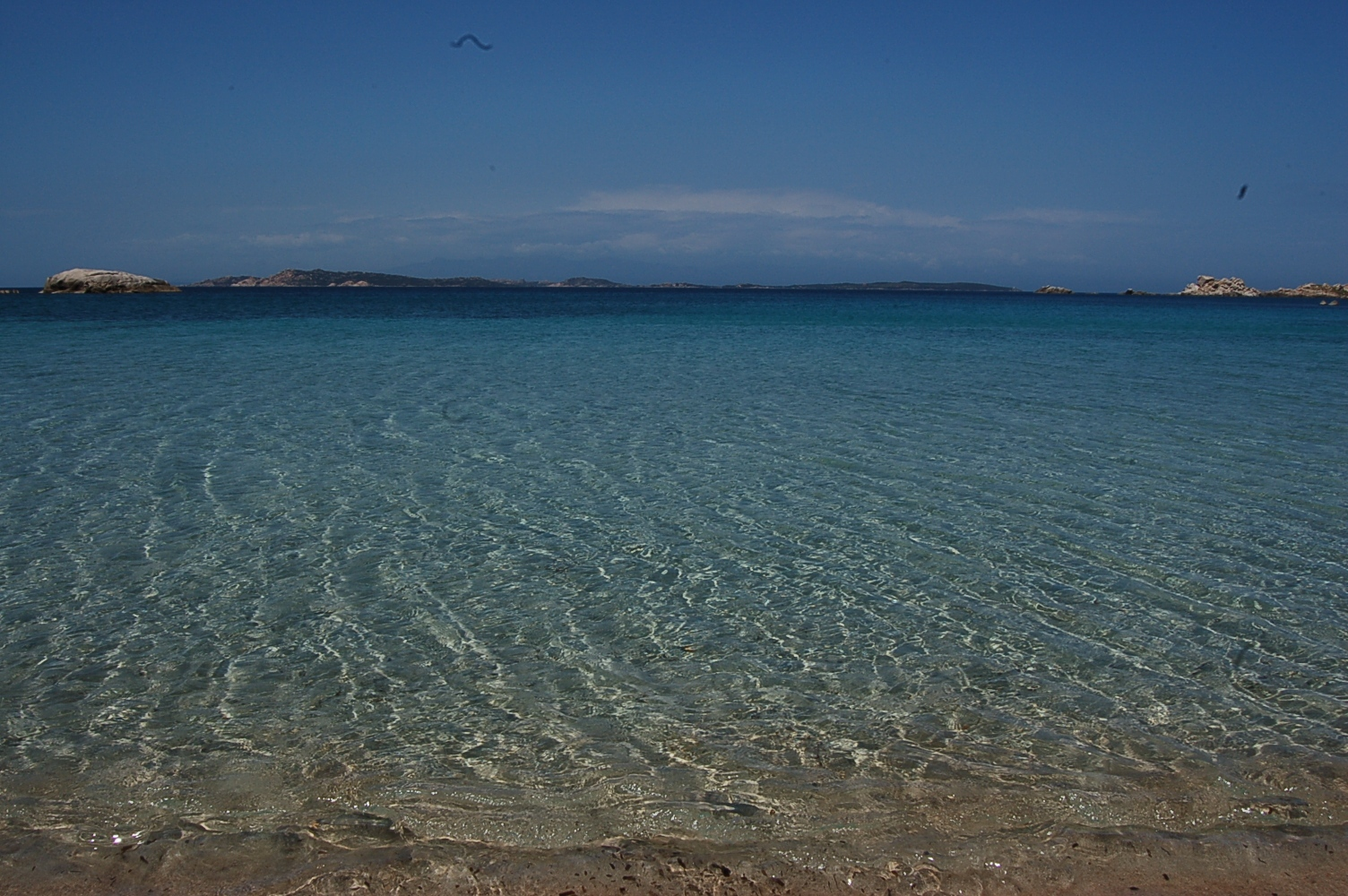
Bassa Trinità beach

The island of Maddalena has several beaches, including Bassa Trinita and Spalmatore. It is characterized by rocky granitic terrain and has some ancient fortifications. It is connected by causeway with the nearby island of Caprera, known as the last residence of the Italian revolutionary Giuseppe Garibaldi.

== Demographics ==
As of 2026, the population is 10,449, of which 50.2% are male, and 49.8% are female. Minors make up 11.5% of the population, and seniors make up 28.2%.

Historical population

| Year | Pop. | ±% |
|---|---|---|
| 1861 | 1,901 | — |
| 1871 | 1,929 | +1.5% |
| 1881 | 1,895 | −1.8% |
| 1901 | 8,033 | +323.9% |
| 1911 | 8,809 | +9.7% |
| 1921 | 10,301 | +16.9% |
| 1931 | 12,330 | +19.7% |
| 1936 | 10,968 | −11.0% |

| Year | Pop. | ±% |
|---|---|---|
| 1951 | 10,370 | −5.5% |
| 1961 | 11,169 | +7.7% |
| 1971 | 10,724 | −4.0% |
| 1981 | 11,318 | +5.5% |
| 1991 | 11,048 | −2.4% |
| 2001 | 11,369 | +2.9% |
| 2011 | 10,936 | −3.8% |
| 2021 | 10,687 | −2.3% |

Source: ISTAT

=== Immigration ===
As of 2025, immigrants make up 6.7% of the total population. The 5 largest foreign countries of birth are Romania, France, Senegal, Morocco, and Ukraine.

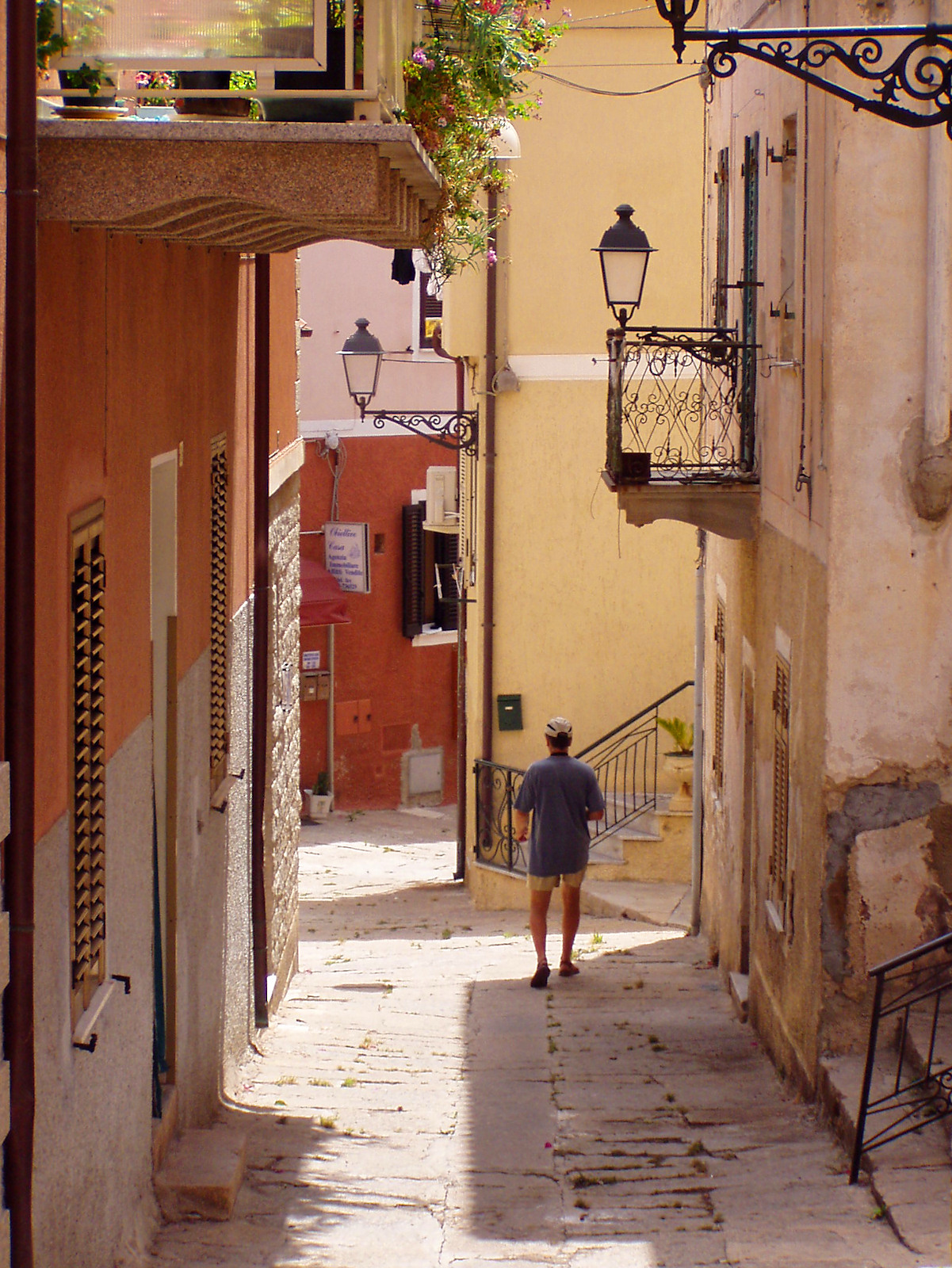
The Old Town.

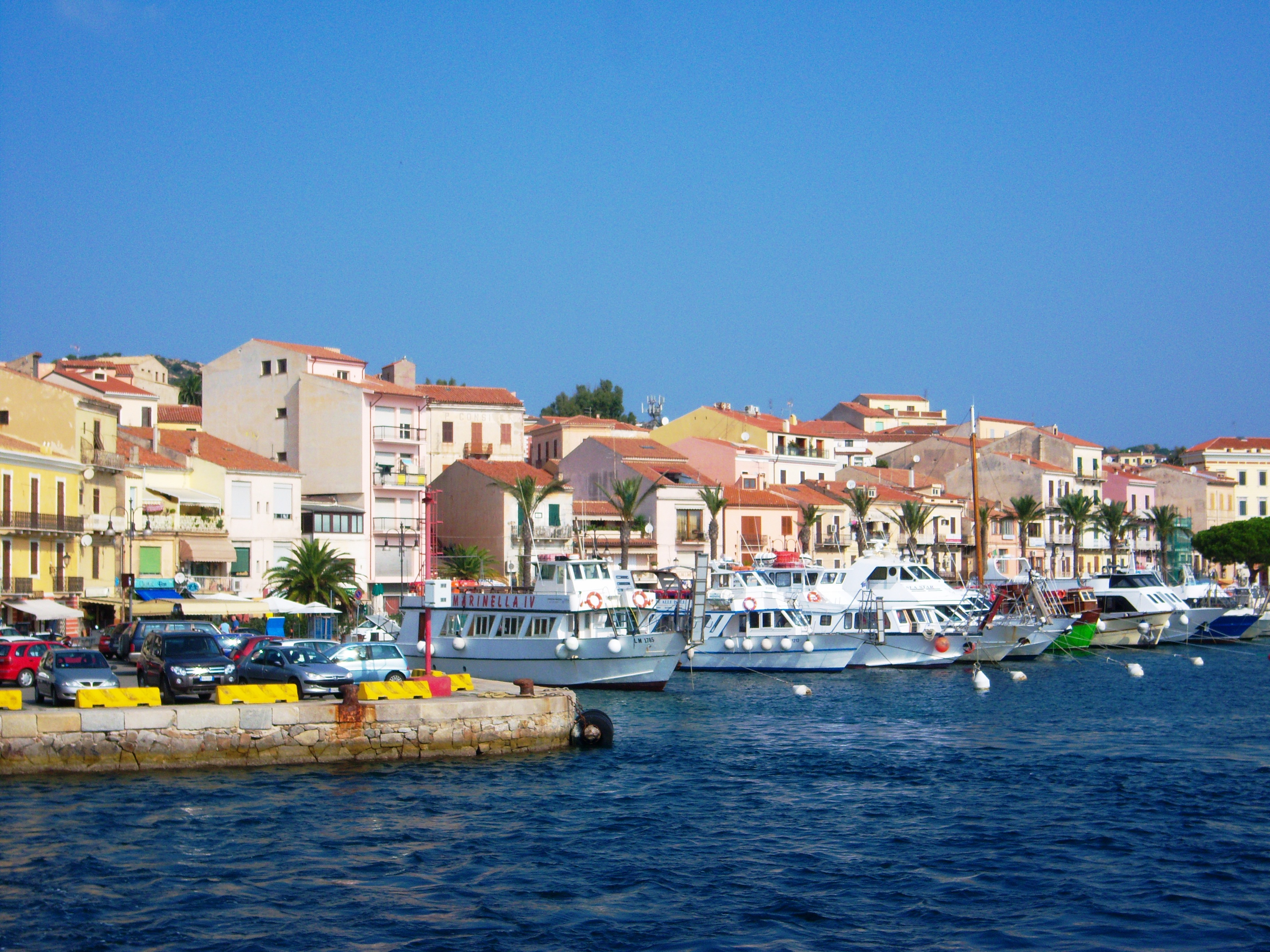
La Maddalena Port.

== International relations ==
=== Twin towns - sister cities ===
- Ajaccio, France
- Nice, France

== See also ==
- List of islands of Italy
