= Francesco Sivori =

Italian admiral

Francesco Sivori (1771 – 22 July 1830) was a Royal Sardinian Navy officer. He was born in Palermo to a Ligurian father, and had previously served in the Ligurian and French navies. He led a squadron of Sardinian vessels to victory over the Tripolitians during the Battle of Tripoli in 1825.
