= Royal Sardinian Navy =

Naval forces of the Kingdom of Sardinia, from 1720 to 1861

- Ensign of the Royal Sardinian Navy from 1816 to 1848
- Founded: 1720
- Disbanded: 1861
- Country: Kingdom of Sardinia
- Type: Navy
- Role: Naval warfare
- Engagements: Battle of Tripoli; First Italian War of Independence; Second Italian War of Independence

The Royal Sardinian Navy was the naval force of the Kingdom of Sardinia. The fleet was created in 1720 when the Duke of Savoy, Victor Amadeus II, became the King of Sardinia. Victor Amadeus had acquired the vessels be used to establish the fleet while he was still the King of Sicily in 1713. The Sardinian Navy saw action in a number of conflicts, including the French Revolutionary Wars and the Napoleonic Wars from the 1790s to 1810s, limited actions against the Barbary Coast such as the Battle of Tripoli in 1825, and the Second Italian War of Independence in 1859. The last war was a major step toward Italian unification, which led to the creation of a united Italian state in 1861. During the fighting in 1860, the Royal Navy of the Two Sicilies either defected or surrender and was merged into the Sardinian Navy, resulting in the creation of the Regia Marina (Royal Navy), which itself became the Marina Militare, the modern Italian navy, in 1946.

== History ==
=== Creation and expansion ===
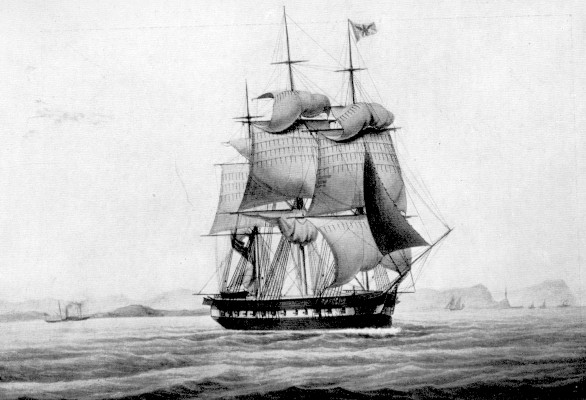
The frigate Euridice during a South America cruise, done in 1838

The fleet traced its origins to the rule of Victor Amadeus II in the early 18th century, who as Duke of Savoy became the King of Sardinia in 1720. Prior to 1713, Victor Amadeus had no navy. As duke he relied on the one or two galleys and smaller vessels belonging the Order of Saints Maurice and Lazarus and on ducal letters of marque authorizing privateers to operate out of his main ports, Nice and Oneglia. When in 1703, during the War of the Spanish Succession, the Emperor Charles VI first proposed that the Duke of Savoy should receive the Kingdom of Sardinia, Victor Amadeus rejected the proposal on the grounds that he had no navy with which to defend the island. In 1713, however, Victor Amadeus acquired the Kingdom of Sicily and with it a squadron of galleys. He issued orders that the squadron should be maintained at five galleys and three other vessels. He created a marine corps and in 1717 promulgated fleet regulations. In 1718, Spain conquered Sicily during the War of the Quadruple Alliance and captured the Savoyard fleet. Victor Amadeus was forced to rely on privateers for the duration of the conflict, but when he gave up Sicily in exchange for Sardinia in 1720 he also received back his fleet.

Throughout its existence, the Sardinian fleet was small compared to the fleets of the Great Powers. The kingdom was a small country with a limited budget; it was also surrounded by potentially hostile states, most significantly France and the Austrian Empire, which placed greater demand for spending on the Royal Sardinian Army than for the navy.

During the 18th century, the fleet took part in a series of wars against the Ottoman Empire, the states of the Barbary Coast, and Spain, the latter in the War of Jenkins' Ear. During that conflict, Sardinia allied itself to the Kingdom of Great Britain after Spanish troops tried to force their way through Sardinian Piedmont in 1742; the small Sardinian fleet of galleys was placed under the command of the British Mediterranean Fleet. The shallow-draft vessels could be used close to shore, where the larger British warships could not easily maneuver, though their small size rendered them vulnerable to bad weather, which kept them from operating through the winter. In the 1790s, Sardinia was a member of the coalitions arrayed against Republican France in the French Revolutionary Wars. Having been defeated by Napoleon in his mainland possessions, King Charles Emmanuel IV abdicated and his brother, Victor Emmanuel I, retreated to the island of Sardinia. Bankrupted and protected by the British Royal Navy, he allowed his navy to decline so that by 1809 it consisted of two xebecs, a galley and two half-galleys. In the Treaty of Vienna that ended the Napoleonic Wars in 1815, the old Savoyard state was restored with the addition of the former Republic of Genoa. This acquisition gave Sardinia access to Genoa's superior shipbuilding facilities. By this time, the largest ship of the fleet was a 20-gun corvette. Victor Emmanuel embarked on a naval expansion program under the direction of Admiral Giorgio des Geneys, who ordered a series of warships from Italian and British shipyards.

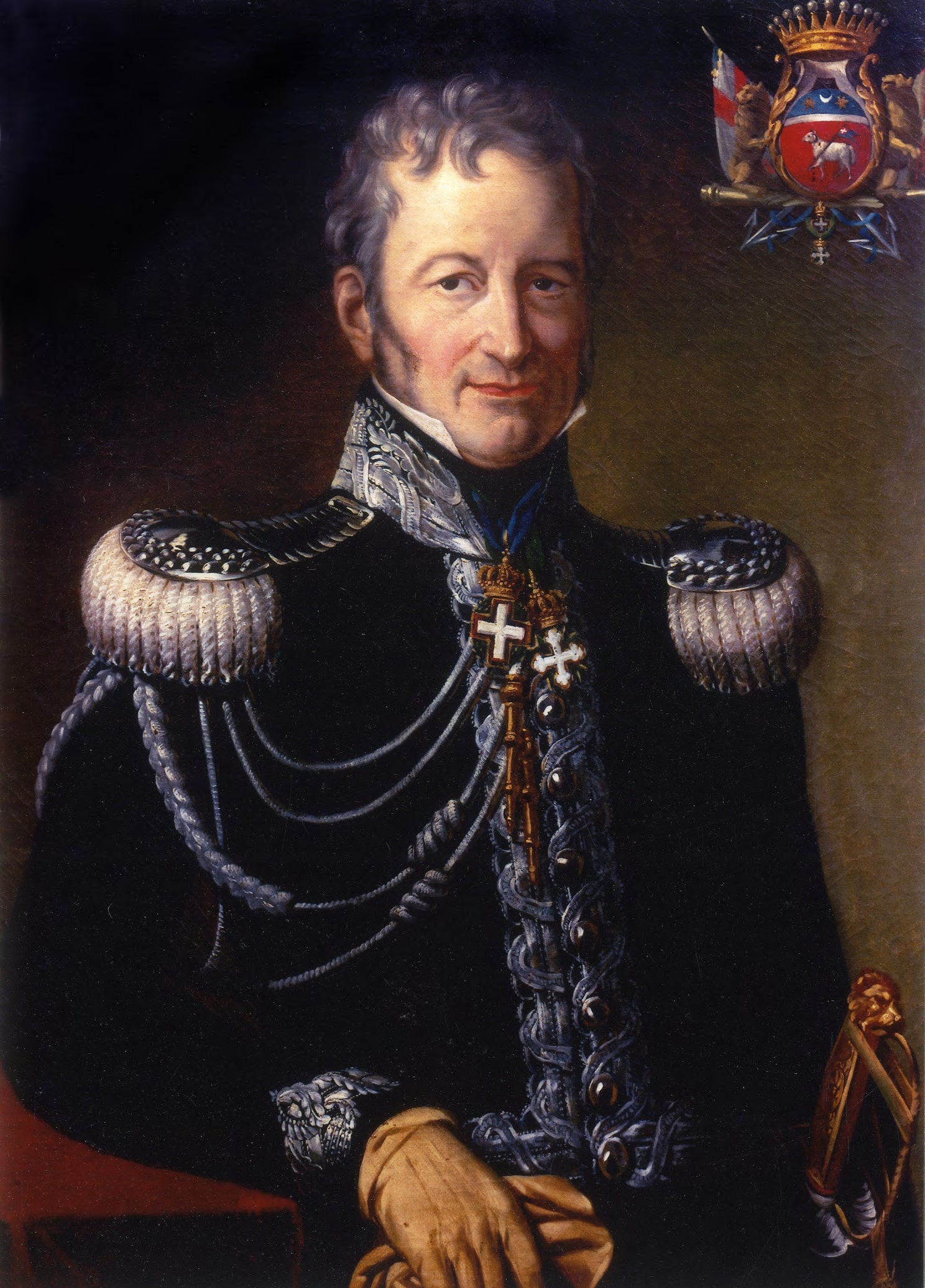
Giorgio des Geneys

Victor Emmanuel did not remain on the throne to see the fruits of his program; revolution in 1821 forced him to abdicate in favor of his brother Charles Felix. During the revolt, the Austrian Navy mobilized ships to intervene in the conflict (which also involved the Neapolitan Kingdom of the Two Sicilies) and attack the Sardinian fleet, but by the time the Austrians arrived the revolt had ended. The Sardinian fleet saw action against the Barbary states twice in the 1820s; Geneys led a squadron to attack Morocco in 1822 that achieved little. Geneys ordered the fleet to attack the Vilayet of Tripoli in 1825, resulting in the Battle of Tripoli. The Sardinian success at Tripoli convinced Charles Felix to continue his predecessor's construction program, ordering a number of frigates, corvettes and sloops in the late 1820s. These included the 50-gun frigates Bereldo and Haute Combe, the 60-gun frigates Carlo Felice and Regina, the 44-gun frigate Euridice, and the 20-gun corvette Aurora. By 1829, the fleet included a total of eight frigates. During this period, the fleet kept warships in the Levant to protect Sardinian interests in the region during the Greek War of Independence, but they saw little activity.

Naval expenditure fell significantly after Charles' death in 1831, as his successor, Charles Albert, was not interested in naval matters. In the 1830s, the fleet sent its warships abroad, frequently to South American waters, to protect Sardinian economic interests in the region. In 1833, Sardinia signed an alliance with the Neapolitans, and that year, the two countries sent a combined squadron of three Sardinian and one Neapolitan frigates to attack Tunis. The squadron forced the city to pay compensation for attacks on Italian merchant vessels. Naval construction continued apace and in 1834, the fleet acquired its first steam warship, the sloop Gulnara, powered by a British-built steam engine. The 24-gun corvette Aquila was launched in 1838, followed by the paddle corvette Tripoli in 1840 and the next year saw the launch of the 18-gun brig Eridano and the powerful 64-gun frigate San Michele; the latter vessel carried the first shell-firing Paixhans guns of the Sardinian fleet. By 1847, the fleet included five paddle steamers.

=== Wars of Italian unification ===
==== First Italian War of Independence ====
During the Revolutions of 1848, two divisions of warships were sent to the Adriatic Sea to support Venice's revolt against the Austrian Empire, supported by a division from the Royal Neapolitan Navy. The Italian states hoped that the revolution would lead to national unification. The small Austrian fleet that remained loyal (after the bulk of the fleet, crewed primarily be Venetians, rebelled) briefly blockaded Venice until the Sardinian–Neapolitan fleet arrived. The ex-Austrian ships in Venice joined the Sardinian squadron consisting of three frigates, one brig, and one schooner, and the Neapolitan squadron to blockade Trieste, where the Austrian fleet had retreated. There, the Austrian ships were trapped, as the Italian forces outnumbered them two-to-one. But the Italian fleet was prevented from pressing the attack on the Austrian fleet, as Trieste was located in the part of Austria that was included in the German Confederation and the Frankfurt Parliament informed the Sardinians and Neapolitans that an attack on Trieste would be treated as an attack on the Confederation.

The Neapolitans were withdrawn after a revolt toppled their government, prompting the Sardinians to send every available vessel of their fleet to reinforce the Italian squadron. By now, the Sardinian contingent consisted of four frigates, two corvettes, two brigs, and eight steamships, commanded by Vice Admiral Giuseppe Albini. Though strengthened by the reinforcements, the Italian fleet nevertheless was weakened by the Neapolitan withdrawal. Further threats from Frankfurt convinced the Sardinians to order Albini to drop the blockade and merely observe the port. Defeats on land, including the Battle of Custoza in July secured Austrian victory. The ensuing armistice signed by Austria and Sardinia that month forced the latter to withdraw its fleet, and Albini took his ships to Corfu. Following the Vienna Uprising, Albini returned to Venice in October to operate with a French squadron that was at that time passively obstructing the Austrian blockade of the city. He was forced to withdraw most of his ships to Ancona over the winter of 1848–1849 due to bad weather. Sardinia declared war again in March 1849, but the fleet could not deploy from Ancona to support Venice before the Sardinian army was defeated again at the Battle of Novara in March, forcing the country out of the war a second time. The second armistice required the Sardinian fleet to leave the Adriatic within fifteen days. During the conflict, the ships of the Sardinian fleet were marred by repeated acts of insubordination and poor discipline.

==== Crimean War and the Second Italian War of Independence ====
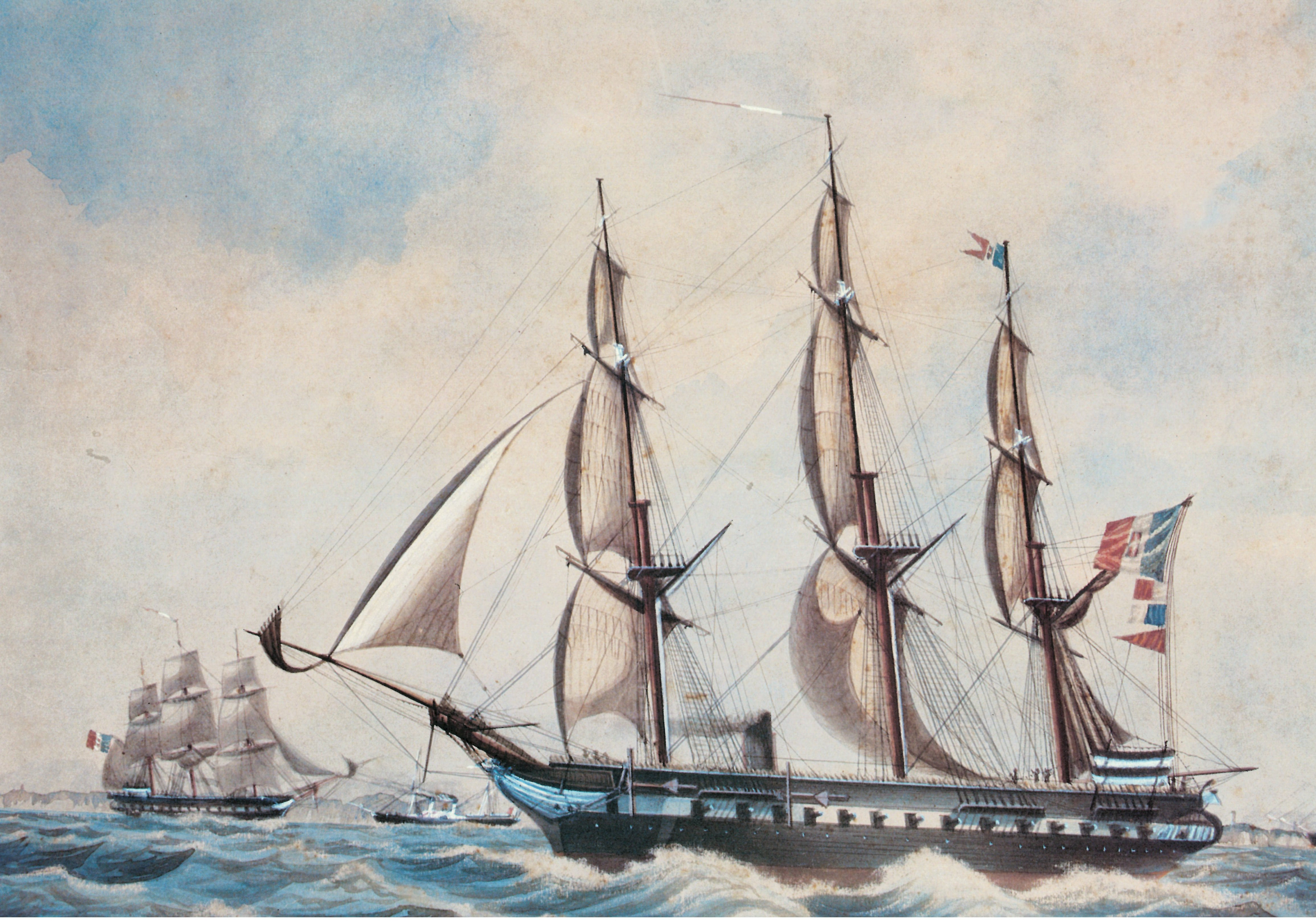
The steam frigate Vittorio Emanuele under the Italian flag in 1861

The appointment of Camillo Benso, Count of Cavour as the Sardinian naval minister in 1850 marked another period of reorganization and construction; he restored discipline in the ships' crews and improved the technical quality of the fleet. He ordered the steam frigate Carlo Alberto from Britain, which was commissioned in 1854. She was the first screw-driven warship of the Sardinian fleet. Three more frigates followed later in the 1850s, including Vittorio Emanuele, Maria Adelaide, and Duca di Genova. In 1860, Cavour added a pair of small ironclad warships, the Formidabile class, beginning a series of ironclads built for the Sardinian and later Italian Regia Marina; these ships started a naval arms race with Austria, the traditional opponent of the Italian states. To ensure better discipline and aggressiveness in its officer corps, Cavour worked to instill strong nationalist sentiment in the Sardinian naval academy in Genoa.

Cavour's tenure as naval minister was marked by a more aggressive foreign policy; Cavour also served as the Prime Minister of Sardinia. Under his direction the country joined the British and French during the Crimean War of 1853–1855, though the Sardinian contribution to the war was almost entirely on land; a small squadron consisting of Carlo Alberto and several paddle steamers were sent to support the expeditionary army. The war nevertheless provided an opportunity to seek closer ties with France and experience operating warships under wartime conditions. In 1859, he engineered the Second Italian War of Independence, a major step toward Italian unification, relying on a secret alliance with France to defeat the larger Austrian Empire. During the latter conflict, the Sardinian fleet operated with the French Navy against Austrian ships in the Adriatic. At that time, the Sardinian fleet consisted of two screw-driven frigates, four sail frigates, two sail corvettes, six brigs, and eight paddle steamers. The powerful French squadron, including six screw ships of the line and three ironclad floating batteries, compelled the Austrians to retreat to Pola. The two fleets began preparations for joint amphibious assaults on the Dalmatian coast of Austria, but victories on land at the Battles of Magenta and Solferino ended the war before the landings could be conducted.

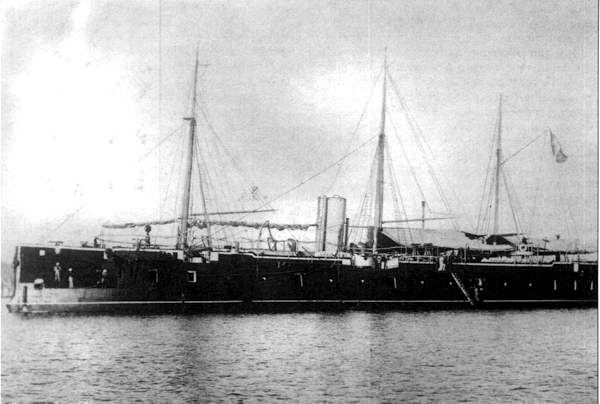
Formidabile, the first Sardinian ironclad warship

The Franco-Italian victory against Austria propelled the Italian states toward unification, and the decisive events began in late 1859 and into early 1860. The central Italian duchies, including Modena, Parma, and Romagna, voted to unite with Sardinia in August and September 1859 and attempts by Austria to create a conference of the Great Powers to prevent Italian unification broke down in January 1860. In March, Cavour returned to the naval ministry while also serving as prime minister. At the same time, Giuseppe Garibaldi led the Expedition of the Thousand to begin the conquest of the Kingdom of the Two Sicilies, supported by the Sardinians. At the time, the commander of the Sardinian fleet was Vice Admiral Carlo Pellion di Persano; in April, the Tuscan fleet was added to the Sardinian navy, and in September, the Neapolitan fleet defected to Sardinian control. Persano sent a squadron into the Adriatic to support an attack on Ancona in mid-1860. Persano then used the fleet to blockade the port of Gaeta, the last major Neapolitan fortress; a French squadron initially blocked Persano from shelling the fortress in an attempt to control the conflict. But the French withdrew in January 1861, allowing a direct attack that forced the Neapolitans to surrender in February. The next month the Kingdom of Italy was created under the Sardinian king, Victor Emmanuel II. The Sardinian fleet provided the core of the unified Regia Marina, which was created through the combination of the Sardinian, Neapolitan, Sicilian and Tuscan navies; the new navy was formally created two weeks later. The Regia Marina itself became the Marina Militare, the current Italian navy, in 1946 following the country's defeat in World War II and the toppling of the monarchy.

== Structure in 1856 ==
Ensign of the Sardinian Navy from 1851 to 1861

In 1856, the Sardinian Navy had a total strength of 2,860 men. The senior officer corps consisted of:

- 1 Admiral
- 1 Vice Admiral
- 3 Rear Admirals
- 7 Ship-of-the-line captains
- 6 Frigate captains

At that time, the fleet consisted of:

- 1 ship of the line
- 1 sail frigate
- 3 steam frigates
- 2 corvettes
- 4 brigs
- 1 brigantine
- 1 gabarra
- 8 gunboats
- 8 steamships
