= Dalwood (surname) =

Dalwood is an English language surname. People with this name include:

- Dexter Dalwood (born 1960), English artist
- Hubert Dalwood Hubert Cyril "Nibs" Dalwood ARA (1924–1976), British sculptor
- Peter Dalwood (1922–2000), Australian rules footballer
- William Trevett Dalwood (c. 1834–1909), partner in South Australian telegraph line contractors Darwent & Dalwood
