= Battle of Tripoli (1825) =

Part of the Sardinian-Tripolitanian war of 1825

- Part of the Sardinian-Tripolitanian war of 1825
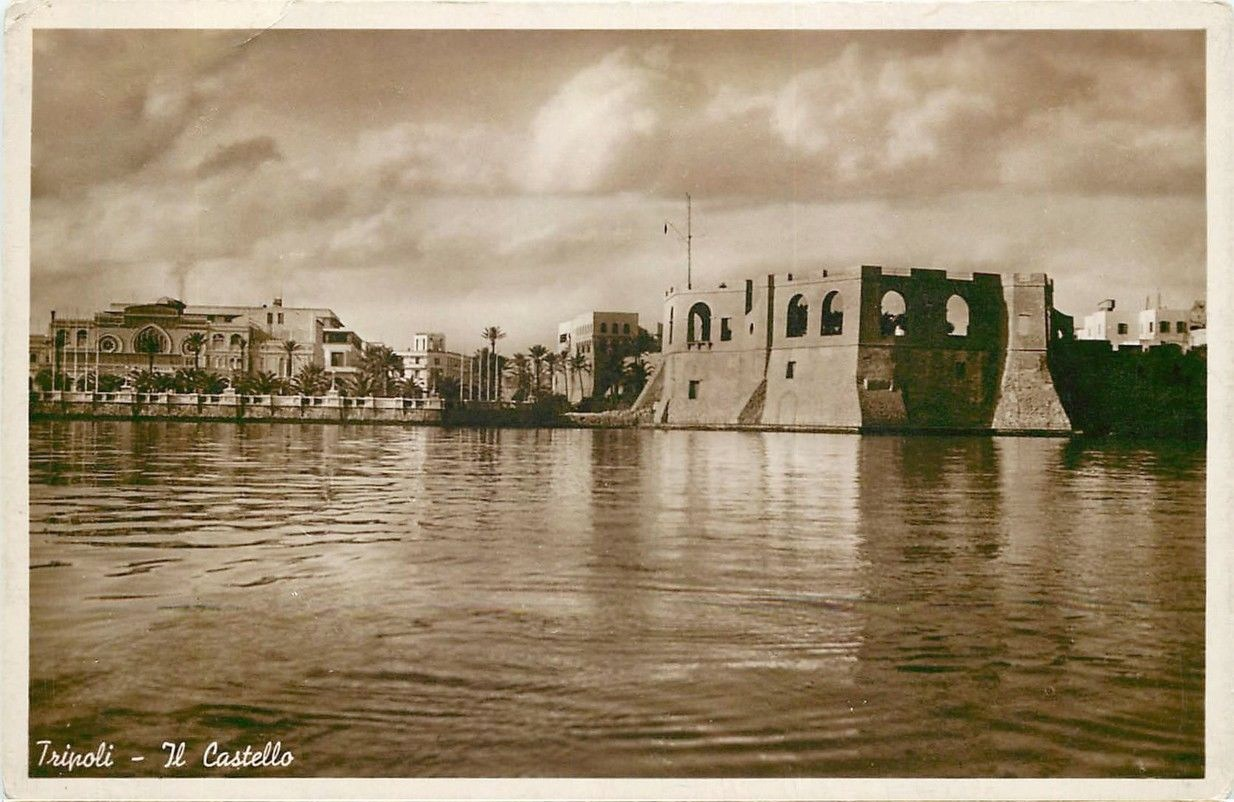
- The Red Castle guarding Tripoli harbour
Date	26–27 September 1825
Location	Vilayet of Tripoli
Result	Sardinian victory: Sardinia Destroyed two tripolitanian ships; Tripolitanian soldiers routed; Peace treaty concluded

Belligerents
Sardinia	Tripolitania

Commanders and leaders
Francesco Sivori	Yusuf Karamanli

Strength
2 frigates 1 corvette 1 brig	1 brig 2 schooners Shore batteries

Casualties and losses
2 killed 5 wounded	60 killed 80 wounded 1 brig destroyed 2 schooners destroyed

The Battle of Tripoli took place between the navies of the Kingdom of Sardinia and Vilayet of Tripoli on 26 September 1825 during the Sardinian-Tripolitanian war of the same year. In order to resist Tripolitanian demands for increased tribute, the Sardinian king sent a squadron to force Tripoli to a favorable peace treaty. The Tripolitanians refused to change their demands and as a result the Sardinian squadron assaulted the city of Tripoli, sinking several vessels and landing a force to attack the city. Suffering heavy naval losses the Tripolitanian government quickly agreed to a favorable peace treaty with Sardinia, thus ending the war on favorable terms for the Sardinians.

== Background ==
In August 1825, the ruler of Tripoli, Yusuf Karamanli, had become enraged when the new Sardinian consul arrived without bringing tribute with him, as had previously been the custom. When learning that Sardinia's King Charles Felix refused to give in and pay the requested sum, the Tripolitanians expelled his consul and declared war on the Sardinian government on 7 August. Karamanli then began sending his corsairs out cruising against Sardinian merchant ships. To bring the Tripolitanians to terms, Charles Felix ordered a squadron of the Royal Sardinian Navy to Tripoli under Francesco Sivori in his flagship, the frigate Commercio, along with Captain Luigi Sefra's frigate Cristina, Giuseppe Zicavo's corvette Tritone, and Maurizio Antonio Villarey's brig Neriede. Sivori left and after being delayed due to poor weather at Tunis, arrived at Tripoli on 25 September.

Once his squadron arrived in Tripoli, Sivori sent the Tritone into the harbor under a flag of truce in order to begin negotiations with Karamanli's government. With assurances from the resident British consul that they would be safe, Sivori went ashore on the 26th and met the Tripolitanian envoy, General Haggi Mohammed. Although negotiations at first seemed to be going well, the next day Karamanli sent a note with suggested terms that essentially abrogated the peace treaty that British Admiral Edward Pellew had negotiated on Sardinia's behalf after the Bombardment of Algiers in 1816. Seeing that Karamanli had no intention of offering acceptable terms, Sivori decided his best course of action would be to attack Tripoli. Before returning to his squadron Sivori managed to get the British consul to take under his protection what Sardinians remained in Tripoli. Sivori's force had a significant advantage over the Tripolitanian fleet, which only had a 12-gun brig and a pair of 6-gun schooners defending the harbor. Despite the disadvantage in naval power, Karamanli had significant forces ashore and several forts and shore batteries defending the harbor. Upon returning to his vessel, Sivori gave Karamanli a four-hour ultimatum that he would bombard the city unless better peace terms were offered by the Tripolitanians.

== Battle ==
The four hours passed with no reply, and Sivori began formulating his plan of attack against Tripoli. Though the Sardinian commander had initially wished to use his squadron's frigates in the assault on the city, the seas were too rough to ensure their safety close to shore, so he instead made plans to attack Tripoli using several boats from his squadron's vessels. Sivori placed 260 men in ten boats separated into three divisions under the command of Commercio's Lieutenant Giorgio Mamelli. One division would attack the Tripolitanian brig, another the schooners, and the third group of boats would assault the city's dockyard and customs house to ensure no reinforcements could enter the harbor.

When the boats first started for the port, the Tripolitanians began firing upon them with their shore batteries. The shelling lasted until 11:00 PM and delayed the assault until 1:00 AM when the Nerid began escorting the boats in closer to shore. Though at first the second Sardinian attack was unnoticed by the Tripolitanians, a sentry sighted the approaching force at 2:30 AM. Despite resistance from the Tripolitanian fleet and forces ashore, Mamelli pushed his force onward through grapeshot and musket fire. He soon reached the Tripolitanian brig and had his force board her, killing its officers and captain as well as a large portion of its crew. A second section of boats assaulted the schooners, taking them by boarding. At the same time, the third section of Sardinian boats managed to force their way ashore despite heavy opposition, capturing the dockyard and routing its Tripolitanian defenders. At 3:30 AM Mamelli fired off two rockets to signal a retreat, and burned the Tripolitanian ships his force had captured.

== Aftermath ==
By the end of the action the Tripolitanians had lost their three largest vessels and suffered heavy casualties, while the Sardinians only had two dead and five wounded. Later in the day while Sivori was making preparations for another attack on the city, a Dutch brig sailed out of port saluting him and signaling that it wished to communicate with him. Upon contacting the squadron, the brig's captain sent Sivori the congratulatory remarks of the British consul at Tripoli. The Sardinian commander sent the Dutch vessel back into port with a message to Karamanli that if he did not commence negotiations, further military action would be taken against the city. Rather than suffer continued action from the Sardinians, Karamanli acceded to the Sardinian requests and sent an envoy out to the Sardinian squadron.

Upon negotiating with the Tripolitanian envoy, Sivori was able to get an agreement restoring the diplomatic situation to as it had been prior to the events that had sparked the hostilities. In order to ensure that Karamanli would abide by the terms of the treaty, the Sardinians included a provision that if the treaty were not ratified within four hours of its signing, Sardinian hostilities against Tripoli would recommence. Karamanli promptly acceded to the treaty upon receiving it and had the Sardinian consulate's national colors raised and saluted by his forces. The next day Sivori upon invitation arrived at Karamanli's palace, where he and his force were greeted with great respect and honor by the monarch. Though a stipulation was included in the peace treaty that required Sardinia to pay Tripoli 7,000 gold francs, it was canceled and as a result the long practice of Sardinian tributary payments to the Tripolitanians finally ended.
