= Dalwood, New South Wales (Singleton Council) =

Dalwood New South Wales
- Coordinates: 32°37′29″S 151°25′4″E
- Population: 106 (2016 census)
- Postcode(s): 2335
- Location: 34 km (21 mi) NW of Singleton
- LGA(s): Singleton Council
- State electorate(s): Upper Hunter
- Federal division(s): Hunter

Dalwood is a locality in the Singleton Council local government area of New South Wales, Australia. It had a population of 106 as of the 2016 census.
