= George Charles Hoste =

British Army officer (1786–1845)

Sir George Charles Hoste CB
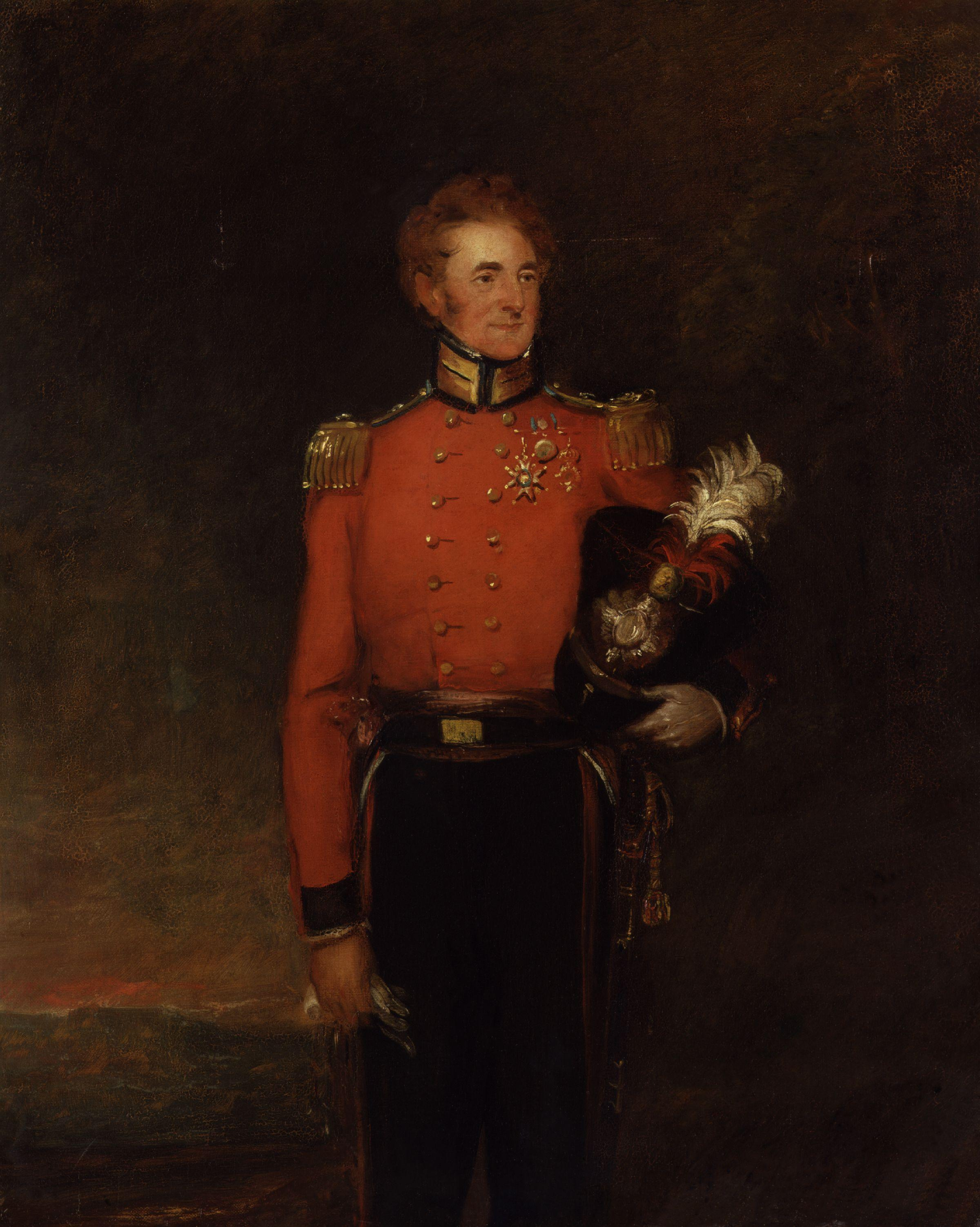
- Portrait by William Salter
- Born: 10 March 1786; Tittleshall, Norfolk, England
- Died: 21 April 1845 (aged 59); Woolwich, Kent, England
- Spouse: Mary Burroughes (m. 1812)
- Children: 4 sons, 2 daughters
- Military career
- Allegiance: United Kingdom
- Branch: British Army: Royal Engineers
- Service years: 1802–1825
- Rank: Colonel
- Conflicts: War of the Third Coalition; Invasion of Naples; Battle of Maida; Anglo-Turkish War; Alexandria expedition; War of the Sixth Coalition; Siege of Antwerp; Siege of Bergen op Zoom; War of the Seventh Coalition; Waterloo campaign; Battle of Quatre Bras; Battle of Waterloo

Sir George Charles Hoste CB (10 March 1786 – 21 April 1845) was a British Army officer who fought in various battles and engagements of the Napoleonic Wars in Italy, Egypt, Belgium, and France between 1805 and 1815. The third son of a clergyman in Norfolk, he was educated at the Royal Military Academy, Woolwich, and commissioned as second lieutenant in the Royal Engineers in 1802. He was promoted first lieutenant in the same year, captain in 1812, brevet-major in 1814, lieutenant-colonel in 1825, brevet-colonel in 1838, and colonel in 1841.

In 1805 Hoste went with an expedition under Lieutenant-general Sir James Henry Craig to protect the Kingdom of Naples. He was in the battle of Maida, at the siege of Scylla castle, and in the withdrawal to Sicily. He was afterwards in Egypt, in 1807, under Major-general McKenzie Fraser, and present at the taking of Alexandria, and the failed attack on Rosetta. He then returned to Sicily, served in different parts of that island from 1808 to 1809, and was present at the attack and taking of the islands of Ischia and Procida in the Bay of Naples.

In 1810 he was in the Spartan frigate, under Captain Jaheel Brenton, and distinguished himself during a successful engagement with a squadron of French Neapolitan vessels in the Bay of Naples; for which he received from Ferdinand the Sicilian Order of Merit. He returned to England in 1811. From 1813 to 1814 he served in Holland with Sir Thomas Graham, and was present at the attack on Antwerp and the storming of Bergen-op-Zoom, for which he obtained the brevet rank of major. He returned to England at the peace of 1814, and on the recommencement of the war in 1815 he joined the allied army at Brussels, and in the battle of Waterloo was attached to the Prince of Orange's 1st Army Corps as commanding Royal Engineer.

He was employed on a committee in Canada in 1825, and also in Ireland in 1828. He was made a Companion of the Bath after the battle of Waterloo, and a gentleman usher of the privy chamber to Queen Adelaide in 1830. He died in 1845.

== Early years ==
George Charles Hoste was born on 10 March 1786 in Tittleshall, Norfolk. He was the third son of the Rev. Dixon Hoste, the Church of England rector of Tittleshall, and Margaret Stanforth, daughter of Henry Stanforth of Salthouse, Norfolk and younger brother of Royal Navy officer Sir William Hoste. Hoste was admitted a cadet of the Royal Military Academy, Woolwich, and obtained a commission as second lieutenant in the British Army's Royal Engineers on 20 December 1802.

== Italy, 1805–1806 ==
After home service at Portsmouth and Dover, Hoste was sent to the Mediterranean in April 1805, and accompanied the expedition under Lieutenant-general Sir James Craig in November, to co-operate with the Russians in the protection of the Kingdom of Naples and King Ferdinand against the looming threat of French invasion. He landed at Castellamare on the Bay of Naples, and took part in the operations and in the withdrawal across the Strait of Messina to Sicily in January 1806. In late June he served in the campaign in Calabria under Sir John Stuart, and was engaged at the battle of Maida on 4 July and at the siege of Scylla Castle from 12 to 23 July, when it capitulated to the British. He then withdrew with Stuart and the forces to Messina, Sicily.

== Egypt, 1807 ==
In March 1807 Hoste went with the expedition under Major-general McKenzie Fraser to attack the Ottoman Eyalet of Egypt, which was aligned with France. He landed at Aboukir on 16 March, and took part on 18 March in storming the defence and outworks of Alexandria, which capitulated, and was occupied on 22 March. In April he took part in the siege of the town of Rosetta until the costly retreat to Alexandria, and, on the evacuation of Egypt by the British forces, returned to Sicily with the defeated expedition in September.

== Italy, 1808–1810 ==
Hoste was kept busy in the Mediterranean during 1808 and 1809 in improving the defences and communications of the east of Sicily (whence King Ferdinand had fled, supported by the British) to resist attack from Napoleonic Naples. The surrender of Capri to Murat in October 1808 led to a British expedition under Sir John Stuart in June 1809 to the Bay of Naples, when Hoste was engaged in the capture of the islands of Ischia and Procida on 25 October, and in the siege of the castle of Ischia which surrendered to the British on 30 October. He then returned with the expedition to Messina.

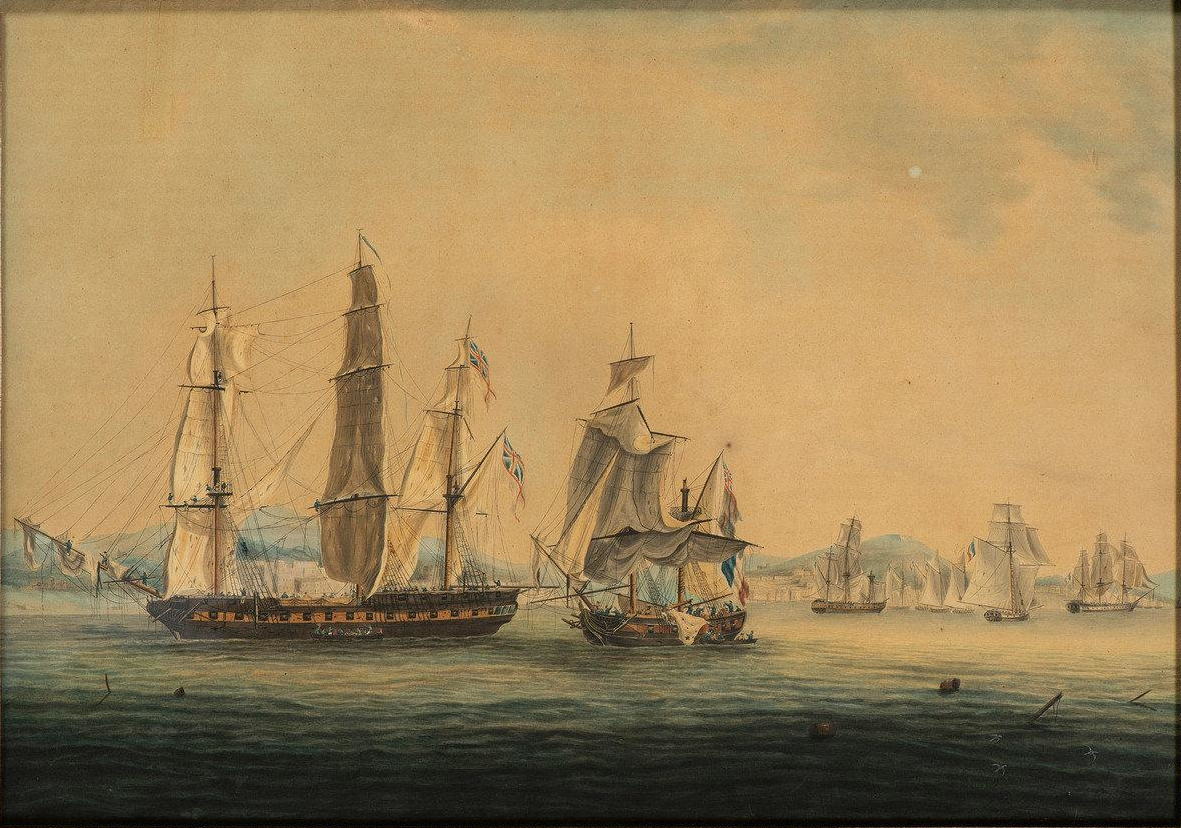
The Spartan taking the Sparviere in tow following the action in the Bay of Naples, 3 May 1810. A painting after Thomas Whitcombe

In May 1810 he was on board the Spartan frigate, of thirty-eight guns, commanded by Captain Jahleel Brenton, on reconnoitring duty; when off the Bay of Naples on 3 May, the Spartan was attacked by a French Neapolitan squadron. At Brenton's request Hoste took command of the quarter-deck guns. After a hard-fought action, in which the Spartan lost ten killed and twenty-two wounded, she stood in victorious with her prize, the brig Sparvière, of eight guns, to the Mole of Naples, where Murat had apparently observed the fight. The Spartan had also caused severe damage to the other ships, which escaped.

In his despatch Brenton praises Hoste's services. King Ferdinand conferred upon him the honour of knighthood of the third class of the royal Sicilian Order of St. Ferdinand and of Merit 'for great courage and intrepidity' on this occasion, and he was permitted by the Prince Regent to accept and wear the insignia. He was recommended by Sir John Stuart for a majority, but was considered to be too young.

== England, 1811–1812 ==
In December 1810 Hoste left Sicily for Gibraltar, and in May 1811, having returned to England, was stationed at Landguard Fort. On 4 January 1812 he accidentally killed his younger brother, Charles Fox, when the brothers were out shooting at Tittleshall, Norfolk, and the gun of George Hoste accidentally went off, and shot his brother, who, according to the European Magazine, died instantly.

== Holland, 1813–1814 ==
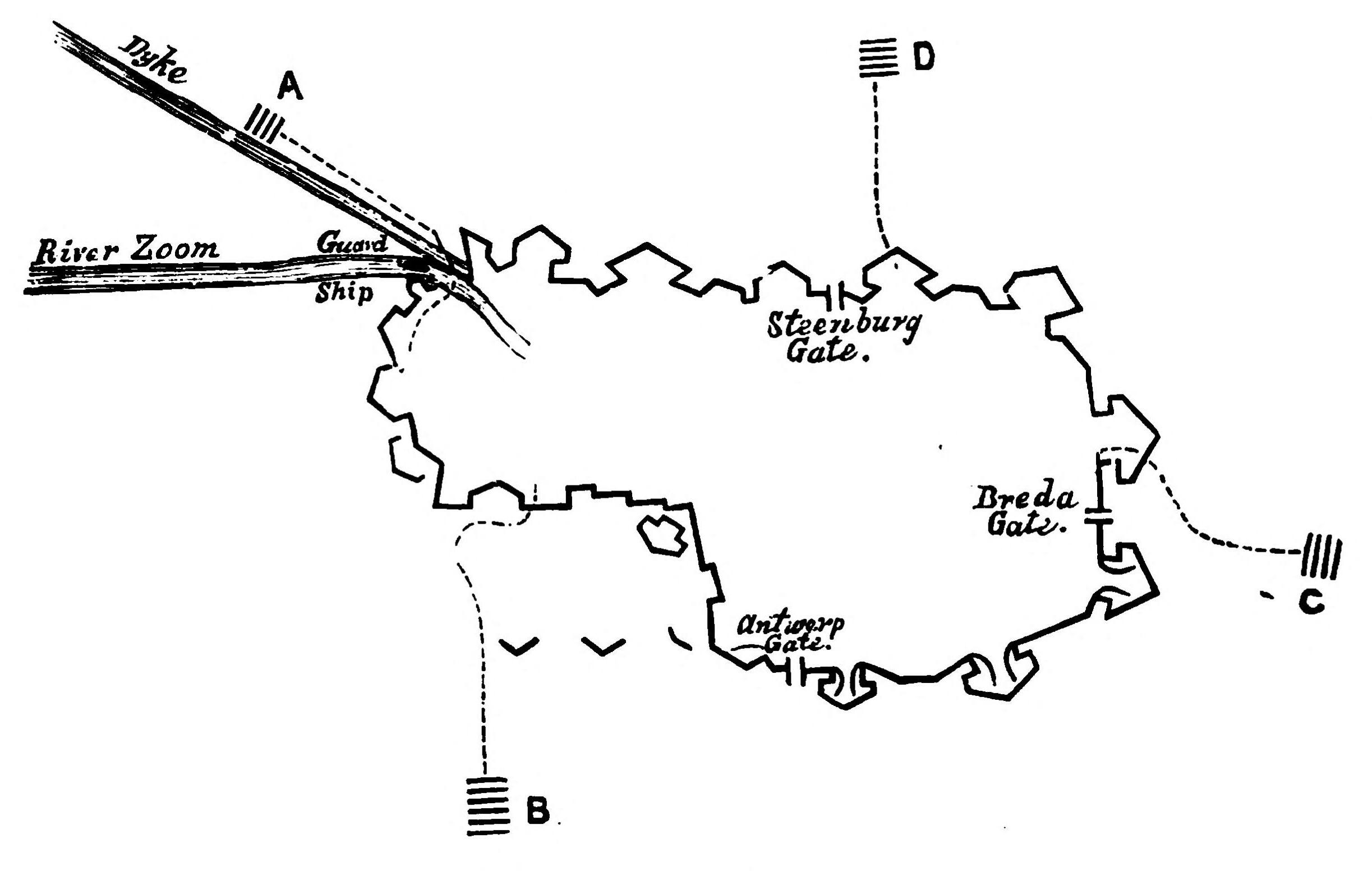
Bergen-op-Zoom, 8 March 1814

In November 1813 Hoste accompanied the British expedition to Holland, landing on 24 November and marching to Delft. He served under Sir Thomas Graham in the bombardment of Antwerp from February 1814 until it was abandoned by the French.

Hoste took part the night assault on the fortress of Bergen-op-Zoom on 8 March, when he led the third column (column B, pictured right) of about one thousand guards under Colonel William, Lord Proby, into the fortress. The object was to take the garrison by surprise, and Hoste's column found no difficulty in escalading and entering at the point designated for them, but by dawn the assaulting British columns were forced to withdraw due to a series of mistakes despite nearly taking the place. Hoste was mentioned in despatches from Graham for this action, and was brevetted major.

== Belgium and France, 1815–1816 ==
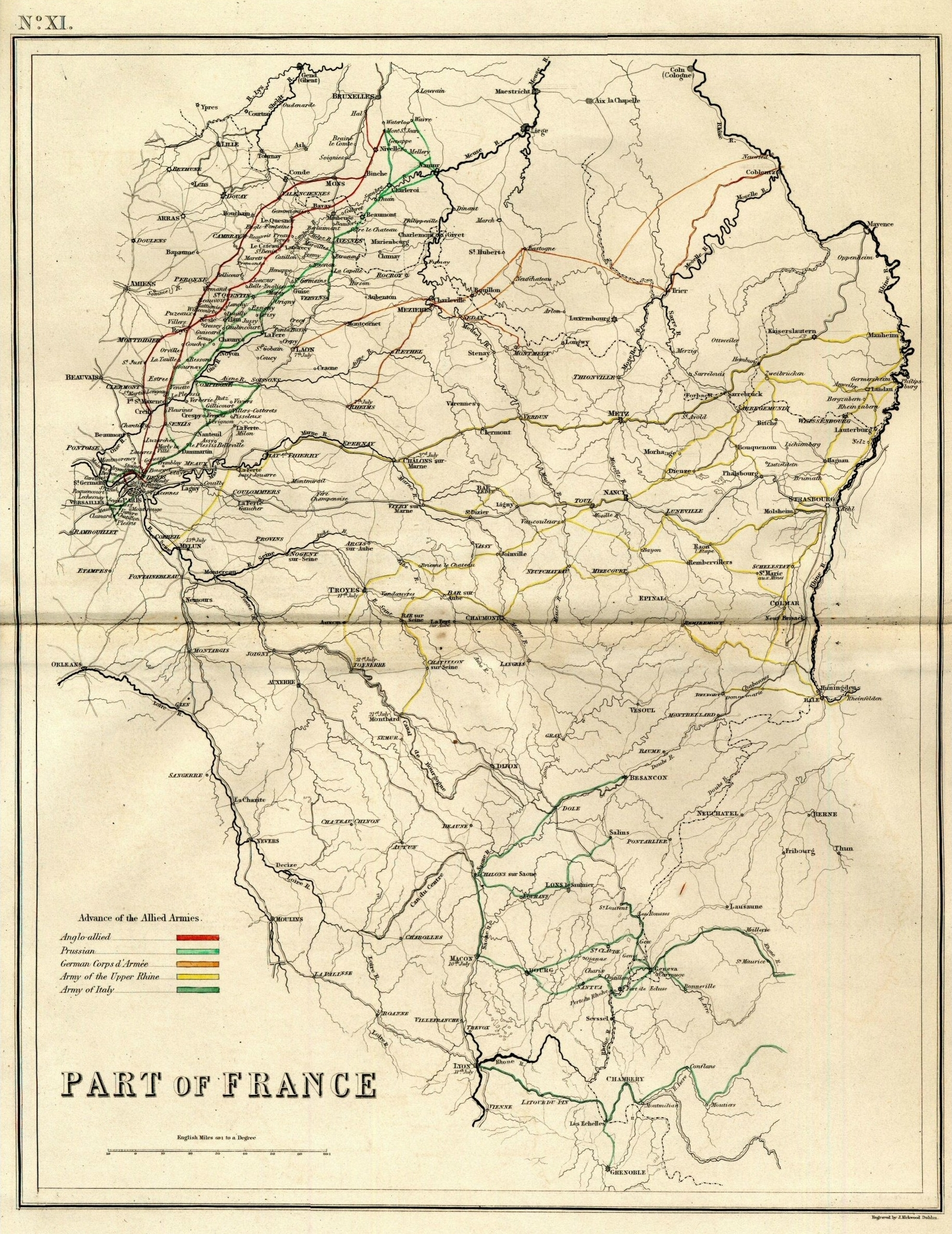
Plan of the advance of the Allied armies into France in 1815

After the conclusion of peace with France and the first exile of Napoleon, Hoste went back to England in May 1814 and took up his earlier duties in the eastern military district, from which he was again ordered a year later to join Wellington's army in the allied Netherlands in June 1815 to wage war on a returned Napoleon.

Hoste was appointed commanding Royal Engineer of the 1st Army Corps commanded by the Prince of Orange, and served in that capacity throughout the Waterloo campaign: in Belgium, at the battles of Quatre Bras on 16 June and Waterloo on 18 June, and, after crossing into France, at the assault of Péronne on 26 June and the occupation of Paris on 7 July. For his services Hoste was mentioned in despatches, and made a companion of the Order of the Bath, military division (dated 22 June 1815), on the recommendation of the Duke of Wellington. In November 1815 he was one of the British commissioners appointed to take over the French fortresses on the northern frontier for occupation by the Prussian allies.

== Later years ==
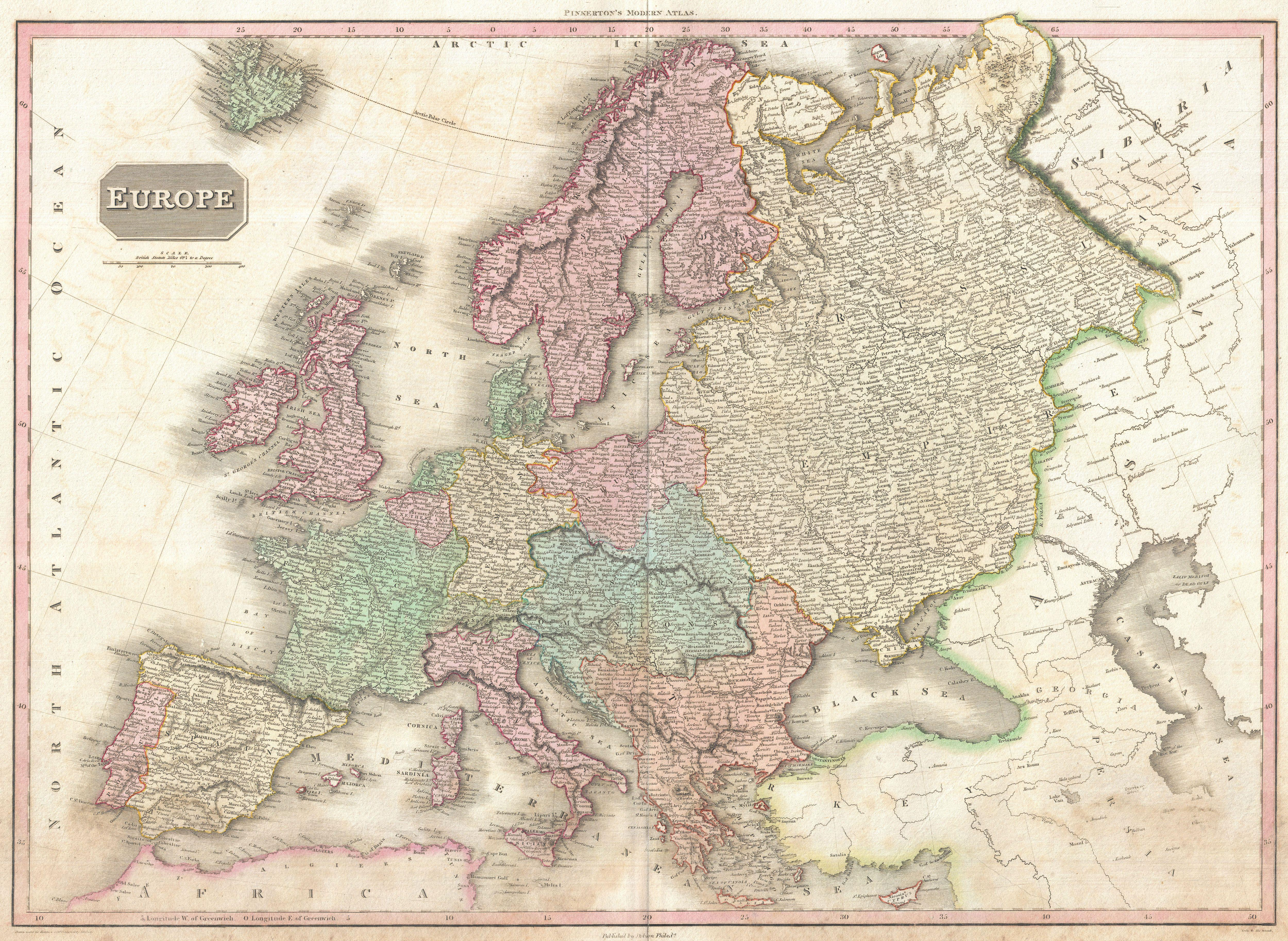
Pinkerton's map of Europe in 1818

In February 1816, Hoste returned to England and stayed there for the next nine years. During that time, he worked in the Medway and Thames military districts, followed by employment in Canada in 1825 and Ireland in 1828 serving on certain committees. He became gentleman usher of the privy chamber to Queen Adelaide on the accession of William IV in 1830. He served as commanding Royal Engineer of the eastern, western, and Woolwich military districts successively.

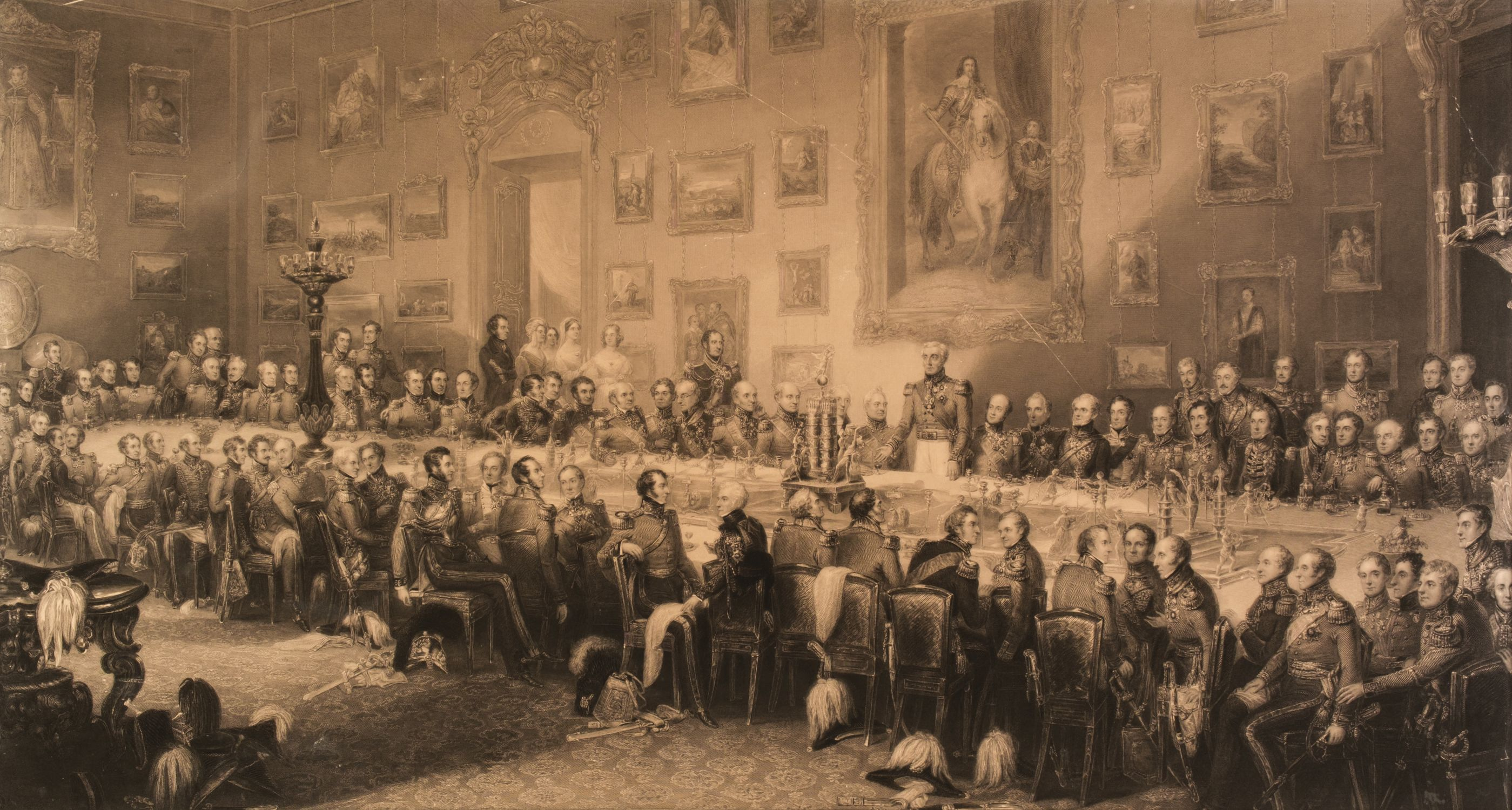
Engraving by William Greatbach after William Salter's painting of the Waterloo Banquet held at Apsley House on 18 June 1836

There is a portrait in oils of Hoste by William Salter, dated roughly 1834 to 1840, which portrays the colonel with red hair and ruddy cheeks, standing, holding his shako with its white and red plumes and star badge, in his Royal Engineers uniform, and wearing the badges of the Companion of the Bath, the Sicilian Order of St. Ferdinand, and the Waterloo Medal. It is one of eighty-one studies made by Salter for a grand group portrait of the 'Waterloo Banquet' held at Apsley House on 18 June 1836, at which Hoste was present.

Hoste died at his home, Mill Hill, Woolwich, on 21 April 1845, and was interred at Charlton churchyard, Kent, in a grave which was later covered by a tomb.

== Personal life ==
George Charles Hoste married, on 9 July 1812, Mary, only daughter of James Burkin Burroughes of Burlingham Hall, Norfolk, who bore him four sons and two daughters.

== Honours ==
- United Kingdom:
  - Companion of the Order of the Bath
  - Waterloo Medal
- Kingdom of Sicily:
  - Knight of the Order of Saint Ferdinand and of Merit

== Gallery ==
Sicily & Calabria, 1807

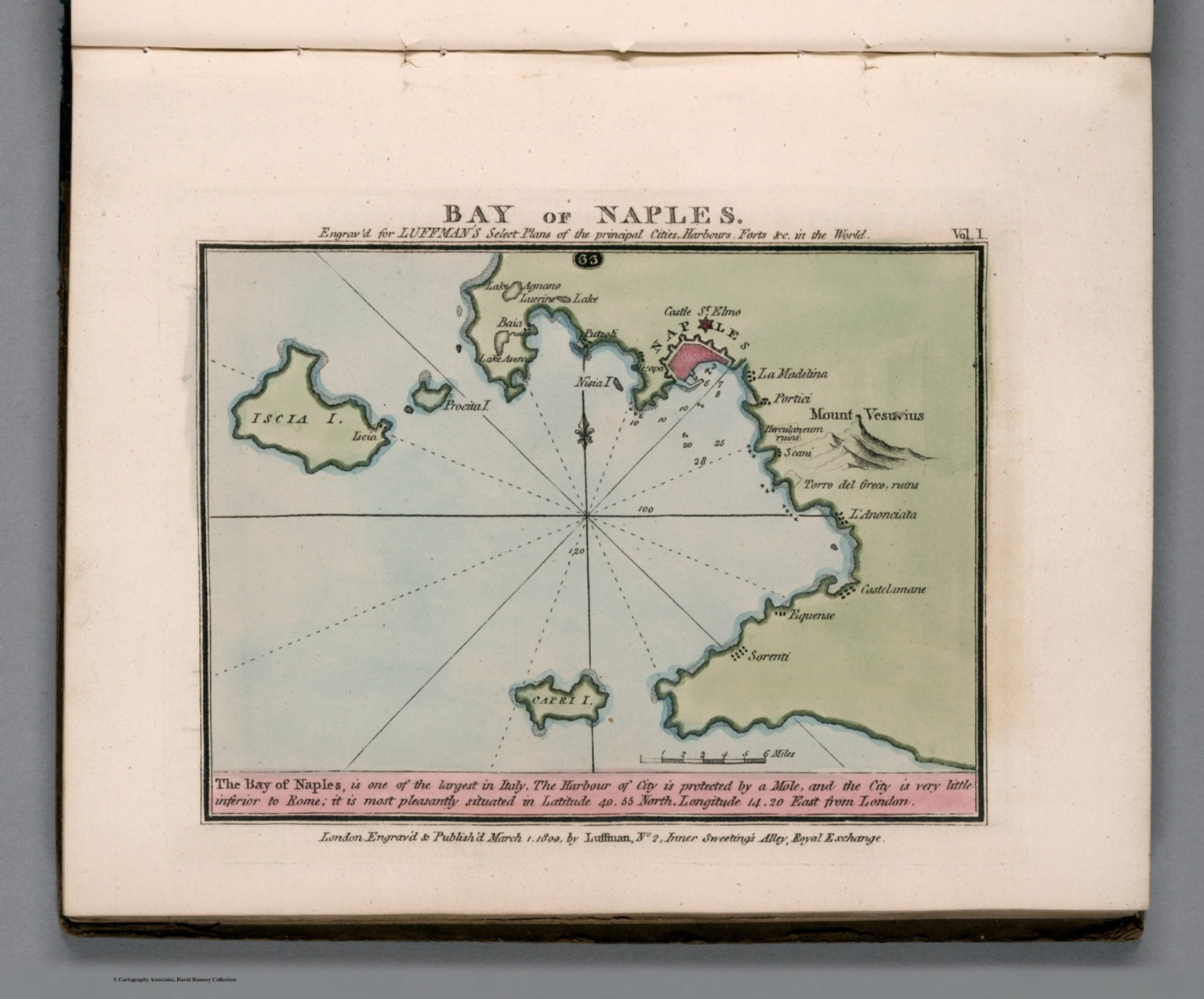
Bay of Naples, 1800

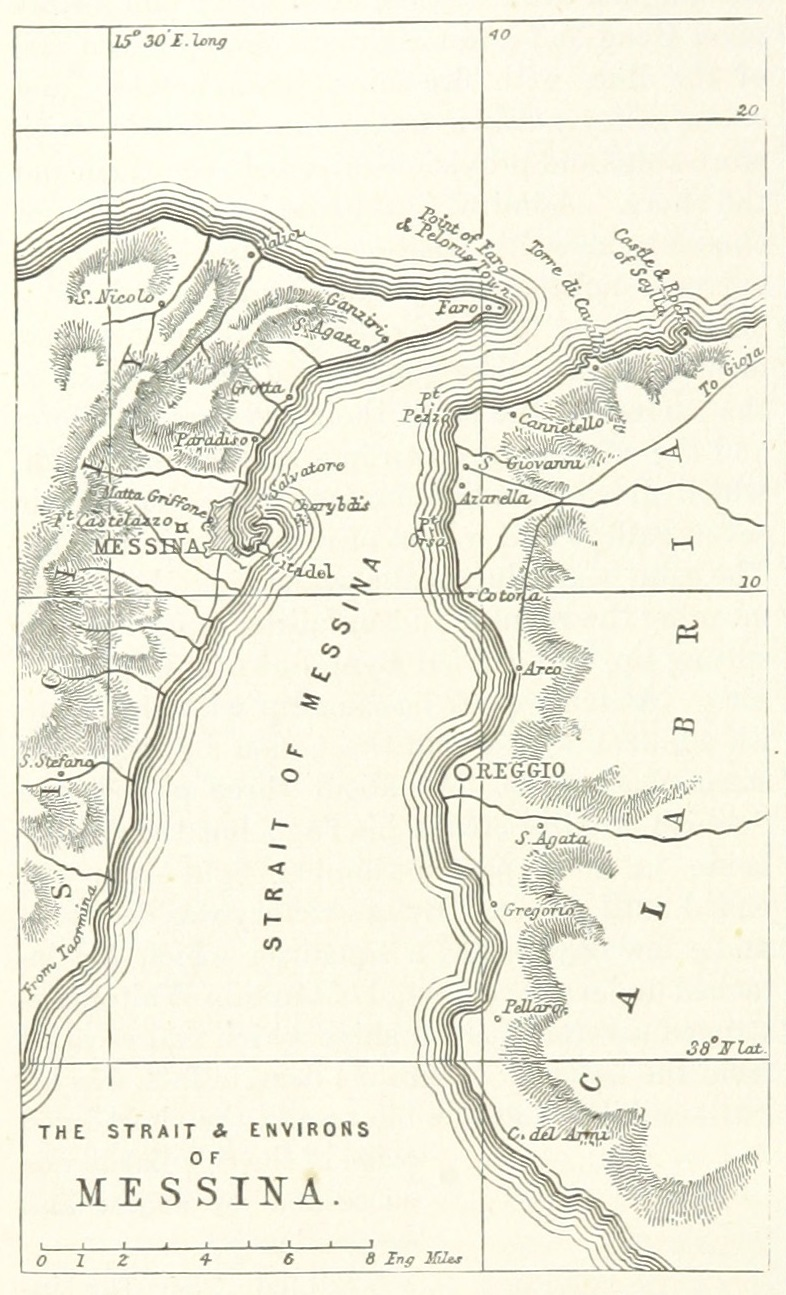
Strait of Messina

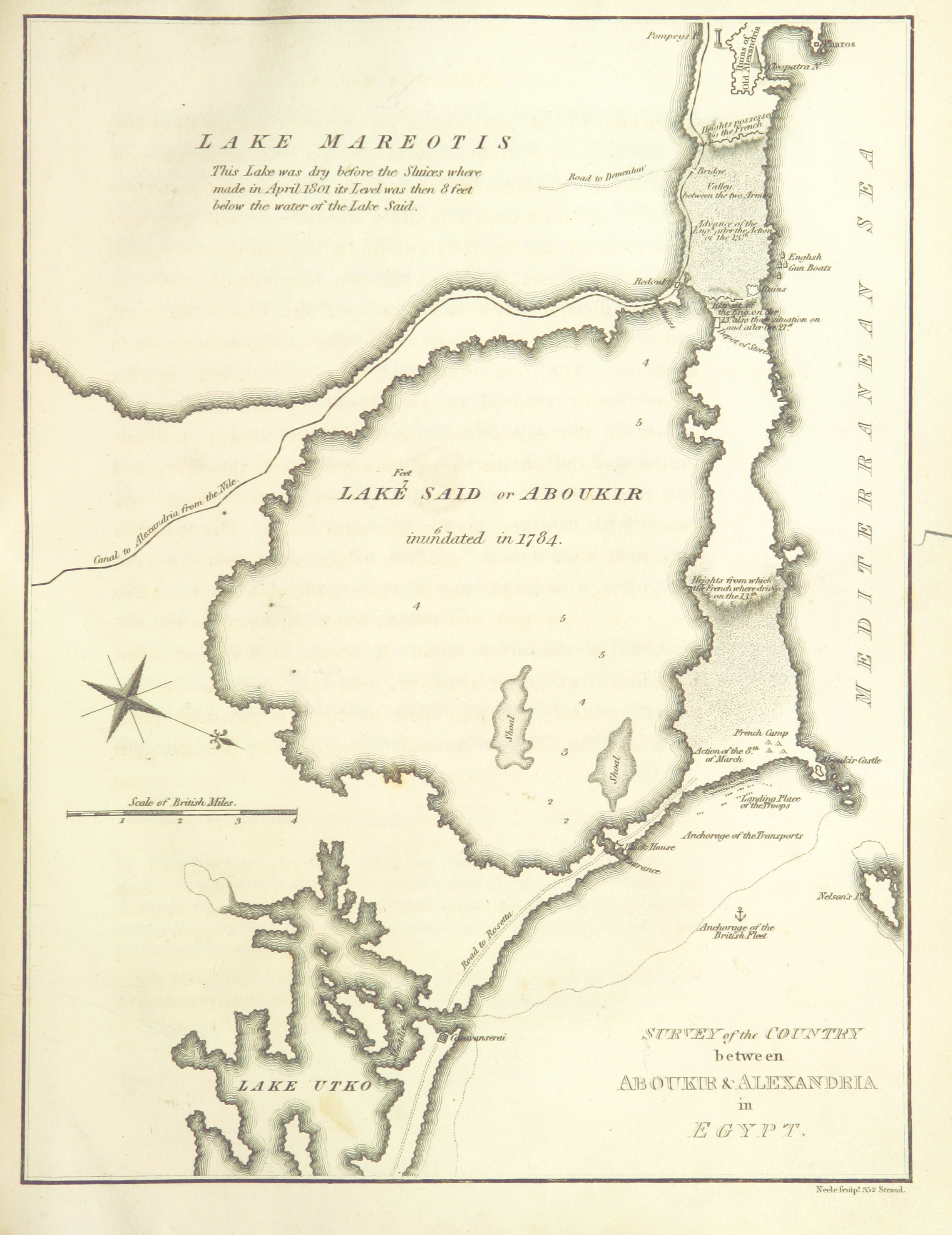
Aboukir & Alexandria, 1810

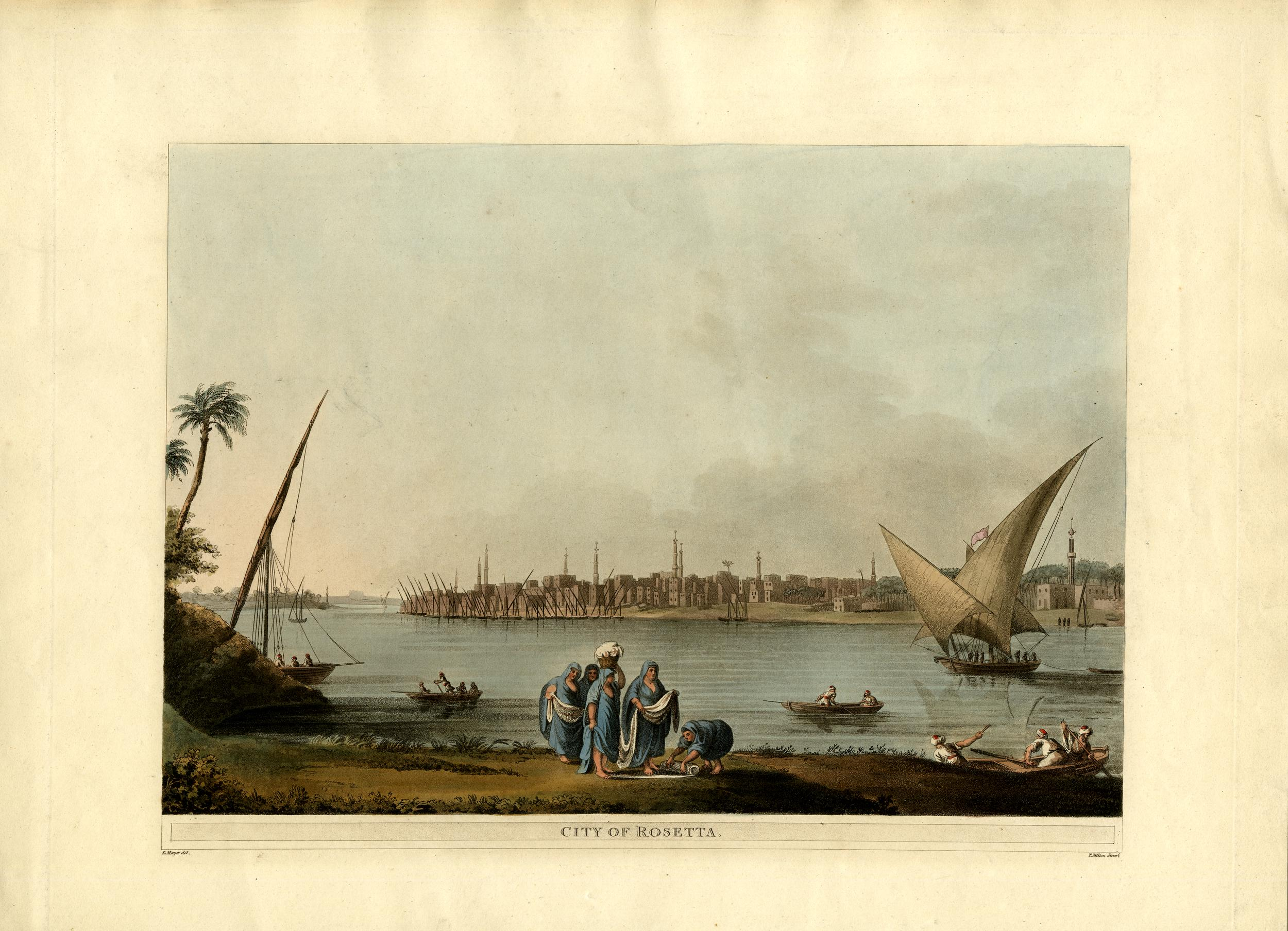
Rosetta, 1801–1803

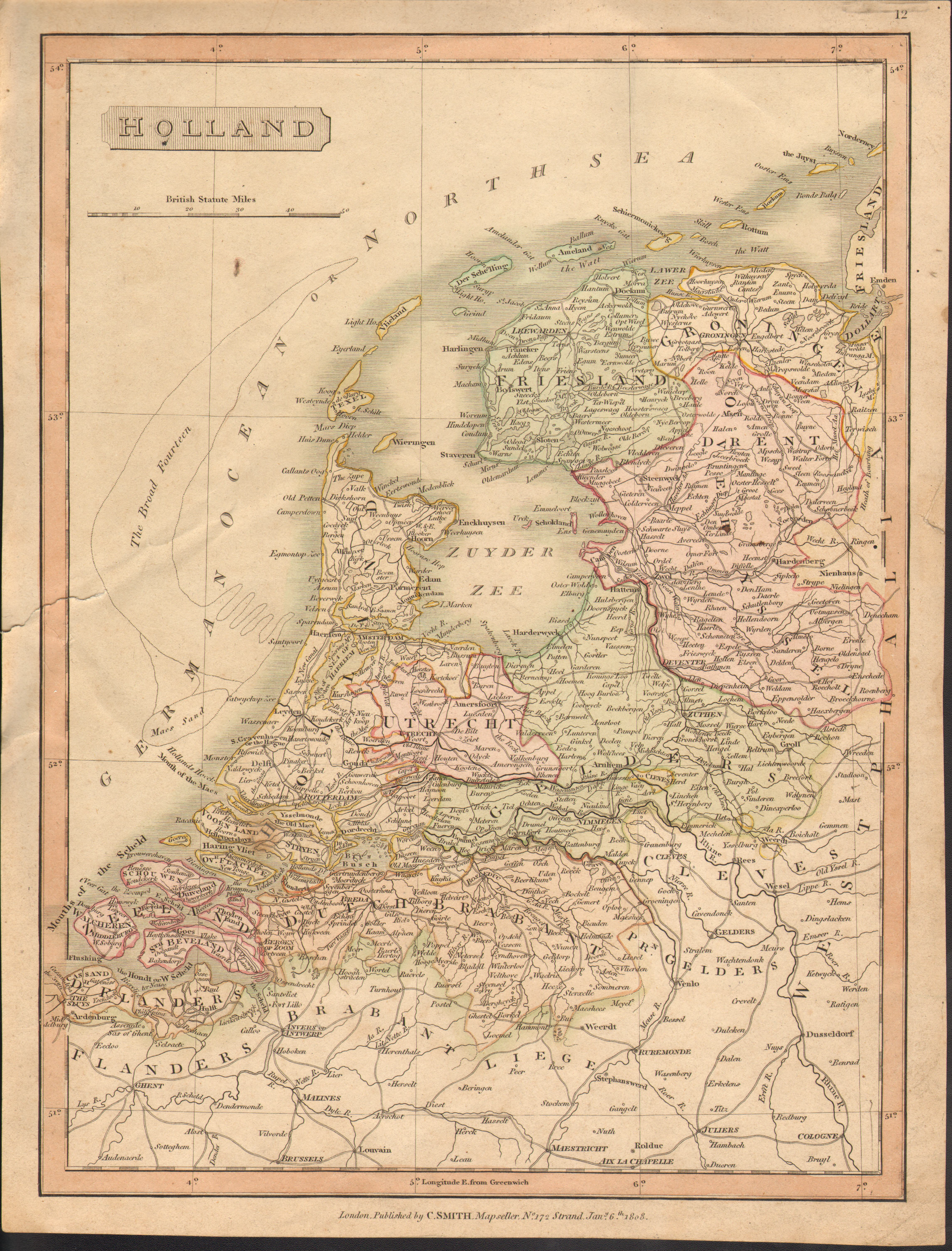
Holland, 1808

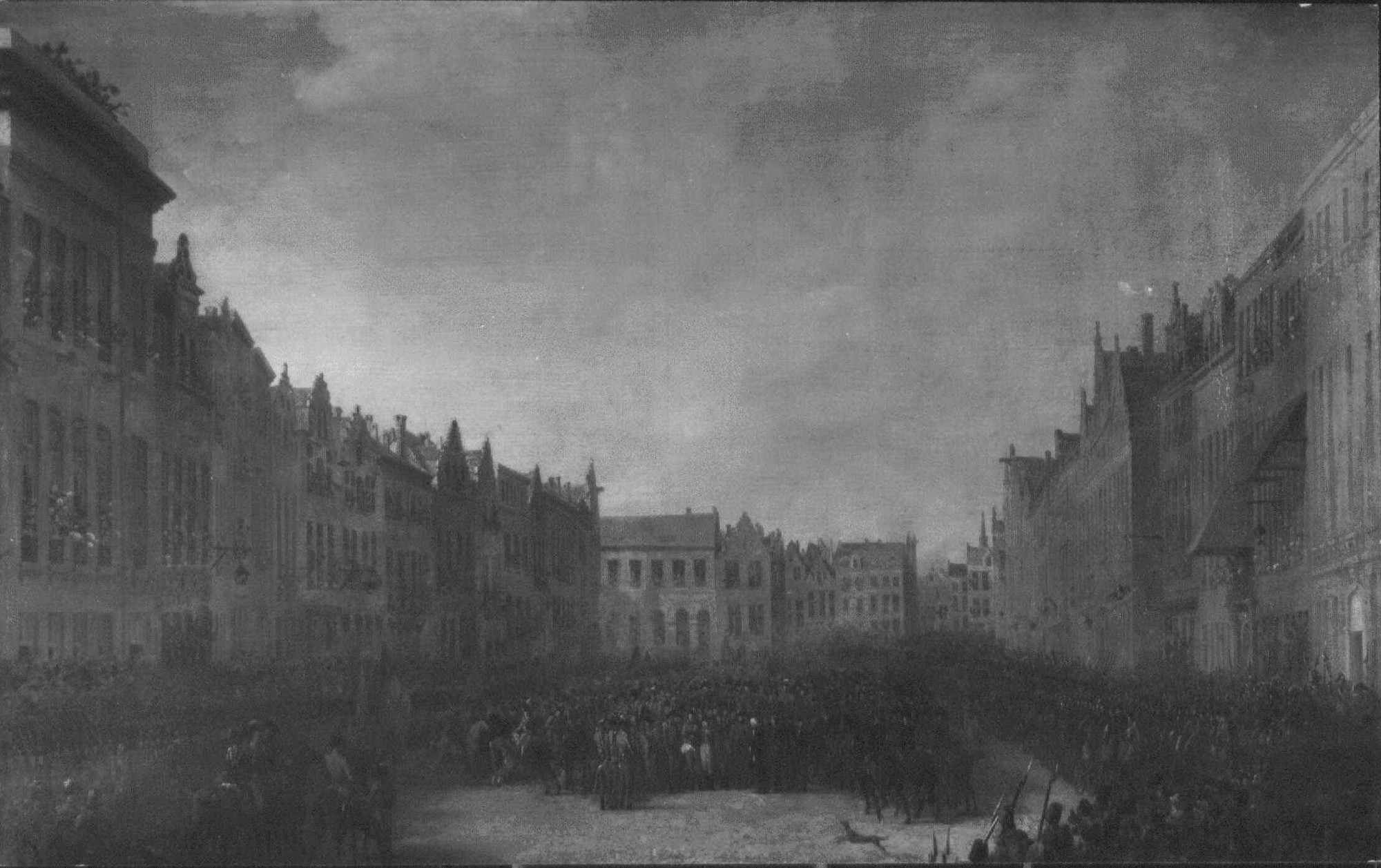
M. I. van Brée: The Allies in Antwerp in 1814

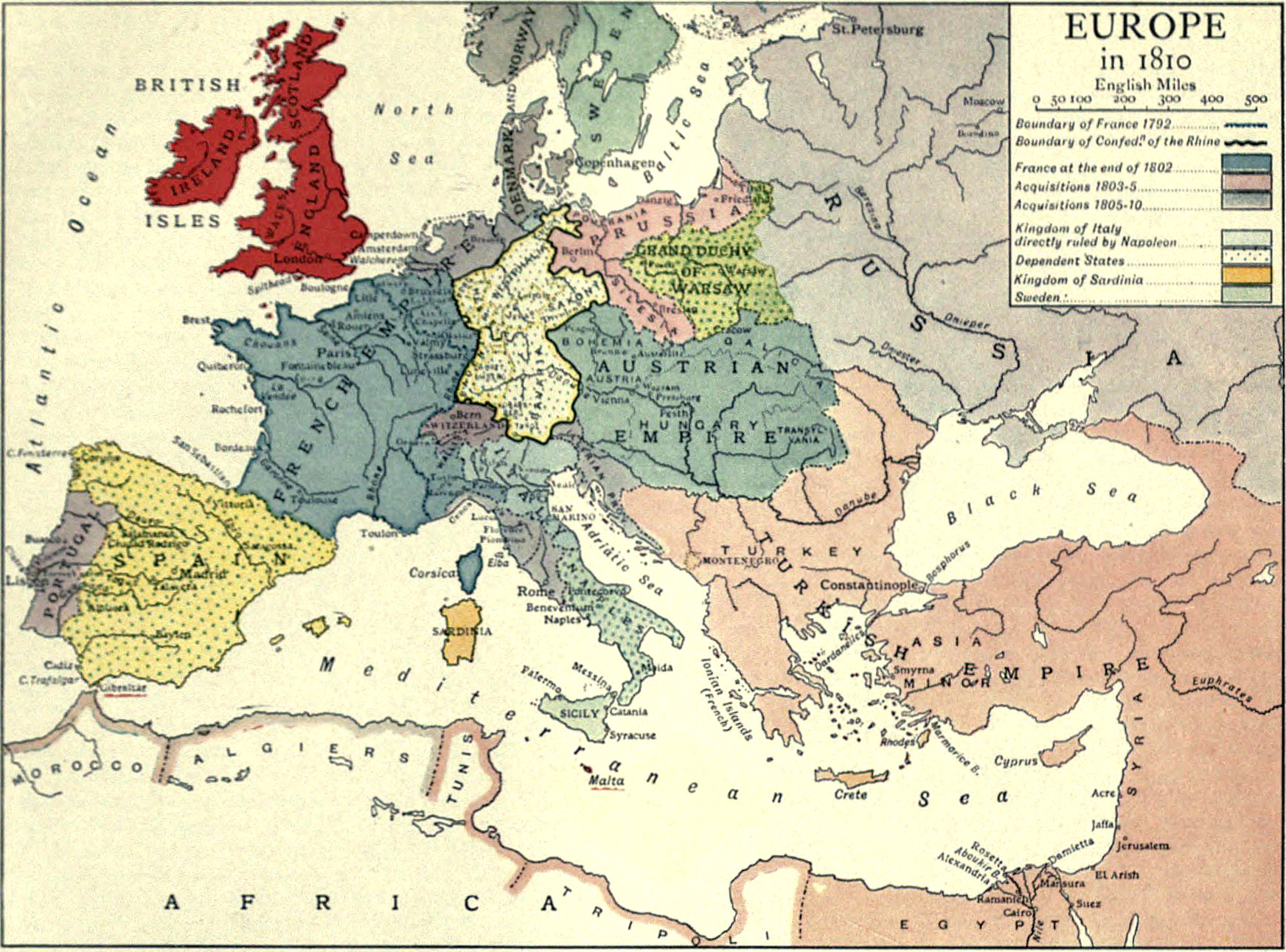
Europe in 1810

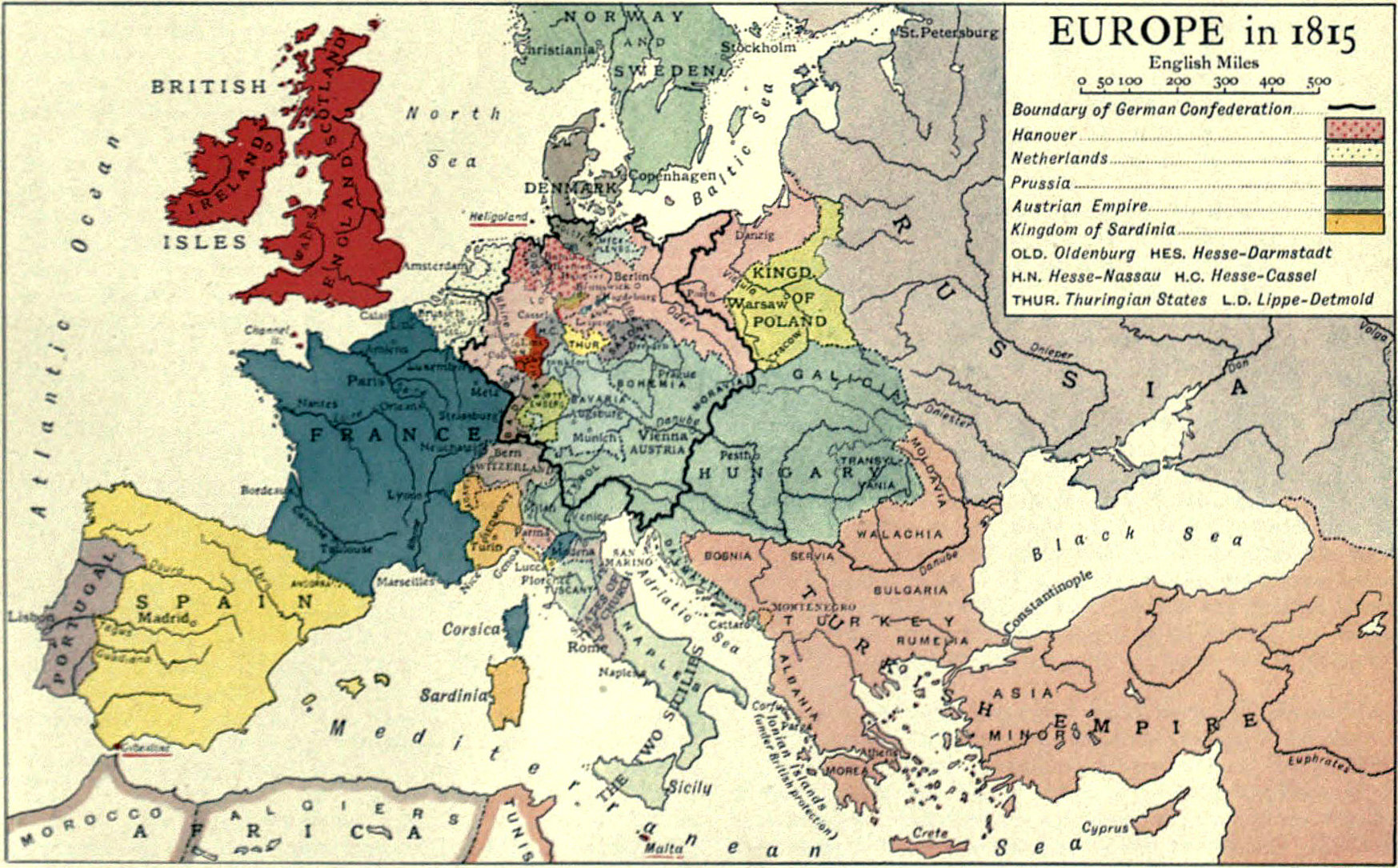
Europe in 1815

== Sources ==
- Baines, Edward (1818). History of the Wars of the French Revolution, 1792–1815. Vol. 2. Longman, Rees, Orme and Brown. p. 433.
- Hoste, Harriet, ed. (1833). Memoirs and Letters of Capt. Sir William Hoste. Vol. 1. London: Richard Bentley. pp. 108, 196–198, 226–227, 237, 240, 248, 254, 259, 270, 272, 276, 277, 282, 284, 287, 292–296, 308, 216, 341, 344, 349.
- Porter, Whitworth (1889). History of the Corps of Royal Engineers. Vol. 1. London: Longmans, Green, and Co. pp. 235–236, 367–379, 544.
- Vetch, R. H.; Falkner, James (2004). "Hoste, Sir George Charles (1786–1845), army officer". Oxford Dictionary of National Biography (online ed.). Oxford University Press. doi:10.1093/ref:odnb/13843. (Subscription, Wikipedia Library access or UK public library membership required.)
- Walker, Richard (1985). Regency Portraits. Vol. 1. London: National Portrait Gallery. p. 265.
- "Studies for 'The Waterloo Banquet at Apsley House, 1836': paintings by William Salter, 1834-41". National Portrait Gallery. Retrieved 12 January 2023.
- The European Magazine. Vol. 61. January 1812. p. 67.
- The European Magazine. Vol. 62. July 1812. p. 71.
- The Gentleman's Magazine. Vol. 80, part 2. July–December 1810. pp. 269–270, 574–575.
- The Gentleman's Magazine. Vol. 85, part 2. July–December 1815. p. 629.
- The London Gazette. Issue 16545. 27 November 1811. p. 2282.

Attribution:

- This article incorporates text from a publication now in the public domain: Vetch, Robert Hamilton (1901). "Hoste, George Charles". In Lee, Sidney (ed.). Dictionary of National Biography (1st supplement). Vol. 2. London: Smith, Elder & Co. pp. 447–448.
