= Action of 3 May 1810 =

- Part of the Napoleonic Wars
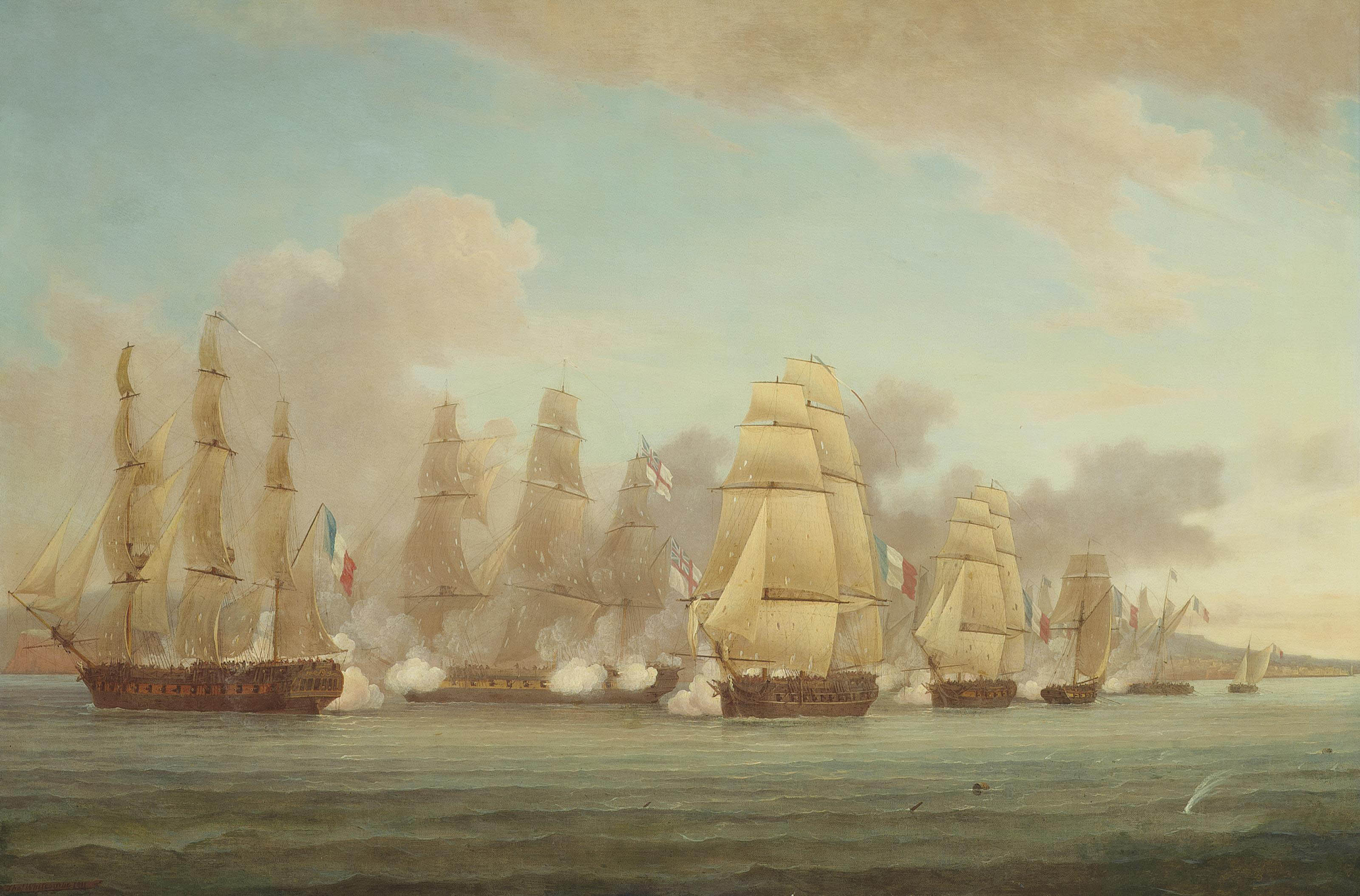
- The Spartan engaging the French squadron, painted by Thomas Whitcombe, 1811
Date	3 May 1810
Location	Bay of Naples, Mediterranean Sea
Result	British victory

Belligerents
United Kingdom	France; Naples

Commanders and leaders
Jahleel Brenton; George Willes; George Hoste	Raffaele de Cosa (surrendered)

Strength
1 frigate	1 frigate 1 corvette 1 brig 1 cutter 7 gunboats

Casualties and losses
10 killed 22 wounded	1 brig captured

The action of 3 May 1810 was a naval engagement in the Bay of Naples between a Royal Navy frigate captained by Jahleel Brenton and a French squadron of eleven warships. The British captured the French brig Sparviere during the battle.

== Battle ==
On 1 May 1810, the Spartan and the Success were on reconnoitring duty. They pursued a French squadron, consisting of the 42-gun frigate Ceres, 28-gun corvette Fame, 8-gun brig Sparviere and the 10-gun cutter Achilles. The French managed to take shelter in the harbour of Naples, and Captain Brenton of the Spartan, realising they would never come out while the two British ships were there, ordered Success to a point south-west of Capri. At dawn on 3 May Brenton observed the French coming out, accompanied by eight Neapolitan gun-boats. The Success was unable to play any part in the action, being becalmed offshore.

At Brenton's request, George Charles Hoste, Royal Engineers, took command of the quarterdeck guns. After a hard-fought action in which Brenton was wounded badly, the Spartan succeeded in boarding and capturing the brig Sparviere and caused severe damage to the other ships.

The Spartan, having lost only ten killed and twenty-two wounded, stood in triumphantly with her prize to the Mole of Naples, where Joachim Murat had watched the fight. Captain Raffaele de Cosa of the Sparviere was taken prisoner and confined in Sicily; after five months he returned to the Kingdom of Naples as part of a prisoner exchange.

== Order of battle ==
British

- Spartan, frigate, of 38 guns; ten killed and twenty-two wounded.

French

- Ceres (Cérère), frigate, of 42 guns and 350 men; severely crippled, escaped under the batteries.
- Fame (Fama), corvette, of 28 guns and 260 men; lost her foretopmast, and otherwise severely crippled.
- Le Sparviere (Sparvievo), brig, of 8 guns and 98 men; taken.
- Achilles (Achille), cutter, of 10 guns and 80 men; escaped under the batteries.
- 7 or 8 gun-boats, each with one 24-pounder and 40 men.

== Gallery ==
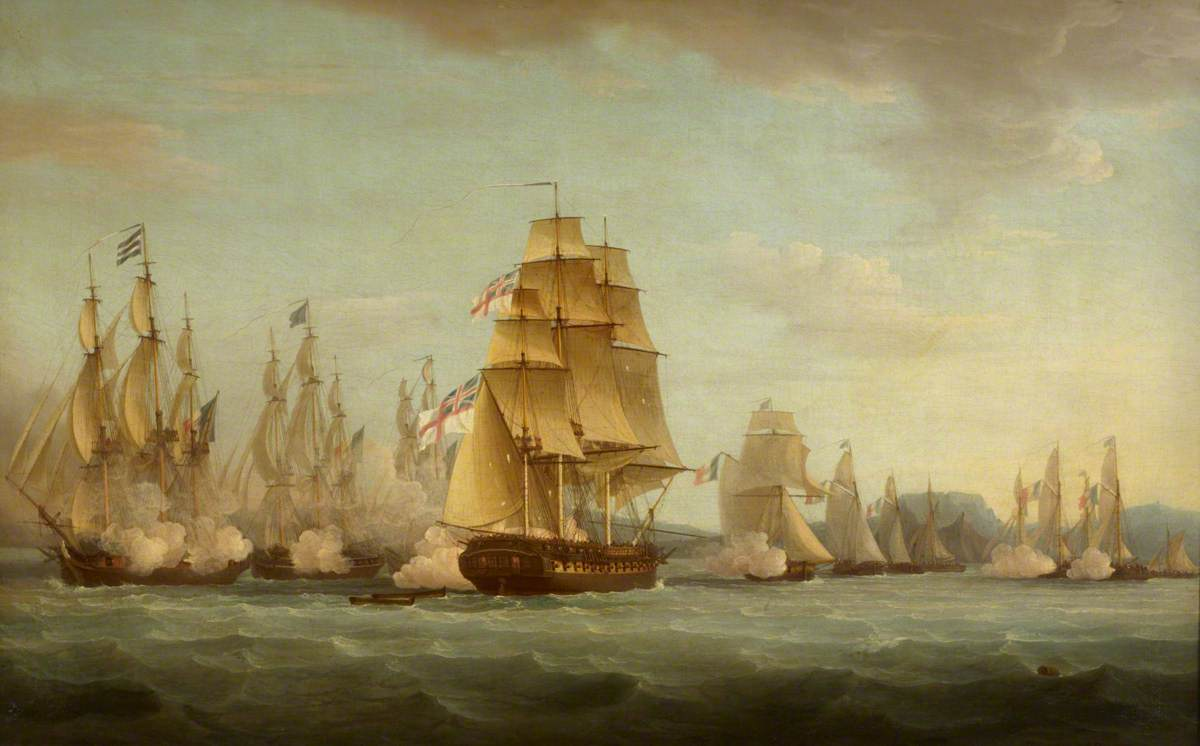
The Spartan and the French squadron.

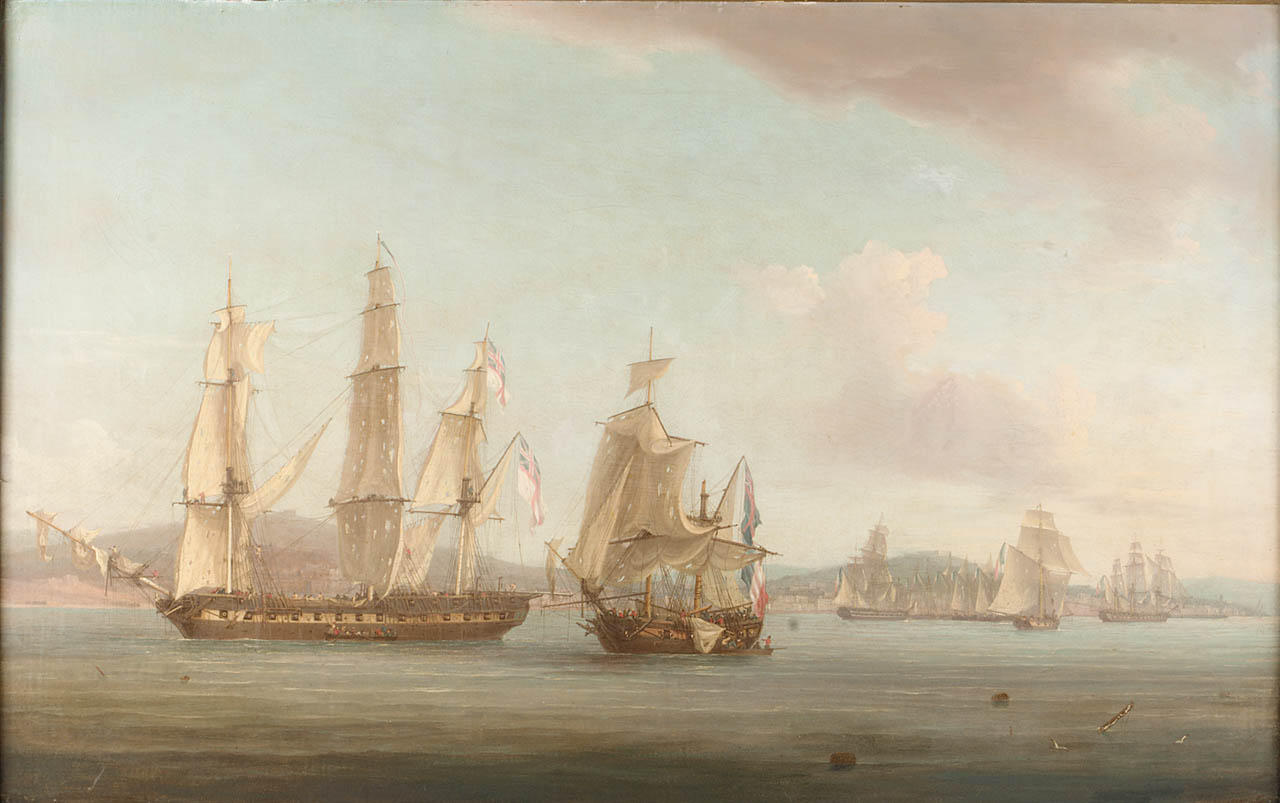
The Spartan taking the Sparviere in tow.
