= Siege of Scylla =

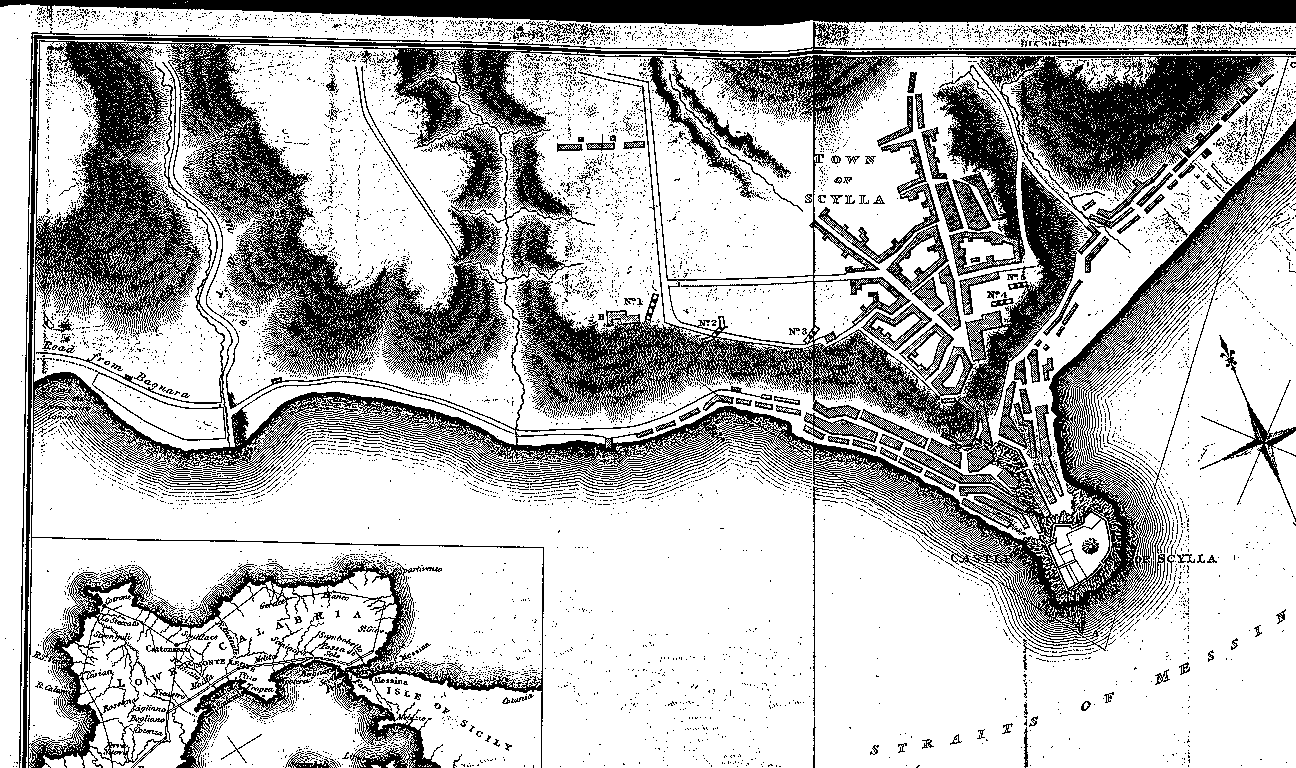
Map of the town and castle of Scylla during the British siege, July 1806

The first siege of Scylla (Scilla) in Calabria took place from 12 to 24 July 1806 during the British expedition to Sicily to oppose the French invasion of Naples.

Scylla Castle held out until 24 July when its 231-man garrison from the 23rd Light surrendered to Colonel Oswald's 2,600 soldiers. Oswald's command consisted of the 10th Foot, 21st Foot, and the Chasseurs Britanniques. The British garrisoned the fort, and intended to use the defensive position as an advanced post to the army in Sicily. However, the French retook the castle in a second siege in February 1808, and the British force was evacuated by sea.

== Background ==
French map of Sicily, Calabria and Sardinia, 1807

After pursuing the flying French for two days after the Battle of Maida, British General Sir John Stuart returned to Monteleone, and took measures for the recovery of the fortified posts round the extremity of the peninsula, chief of which was the Castle of Scylla. For this purpose he despatched a brigade under Colonel John Oswald, with some light artillery and two Engineer officers (Captain J. T. Jones and Lieutenant Lewis), to commence operations against that post. They arrived before the fort in the night of 11 July, and on the following morning made a close reconnaissance of the place.

The Castle of Scylla was perched on the summit of a rock, about 150 feet in height, which jutted out into the sea, and was connected with the land by a comparatively narrow isthmus. Behind this the ground rose to a height nearly equal to that of the rock on which the fort stood. On the land side, which presented the only possible point of attack, the defences consisted of a bastioned front of unusually lofty profile, which completely defiladed the interior of the work. In this front were spacious and airy casemates, with embrasures looking out on the ground before it. The town of Scylla stood partly on the high land in rear, and partly on the neck connecting the fort with the mainland. The whole of the sappers and miners of the French Calabrian army, as well as its reserve artillery, in all about four hundred men, constituted the garrison under the command of Colonel Michel, a French Engineer of some distinction.

== British siege ==
First Siege of Scylla
- Part of the French invasion of Naples
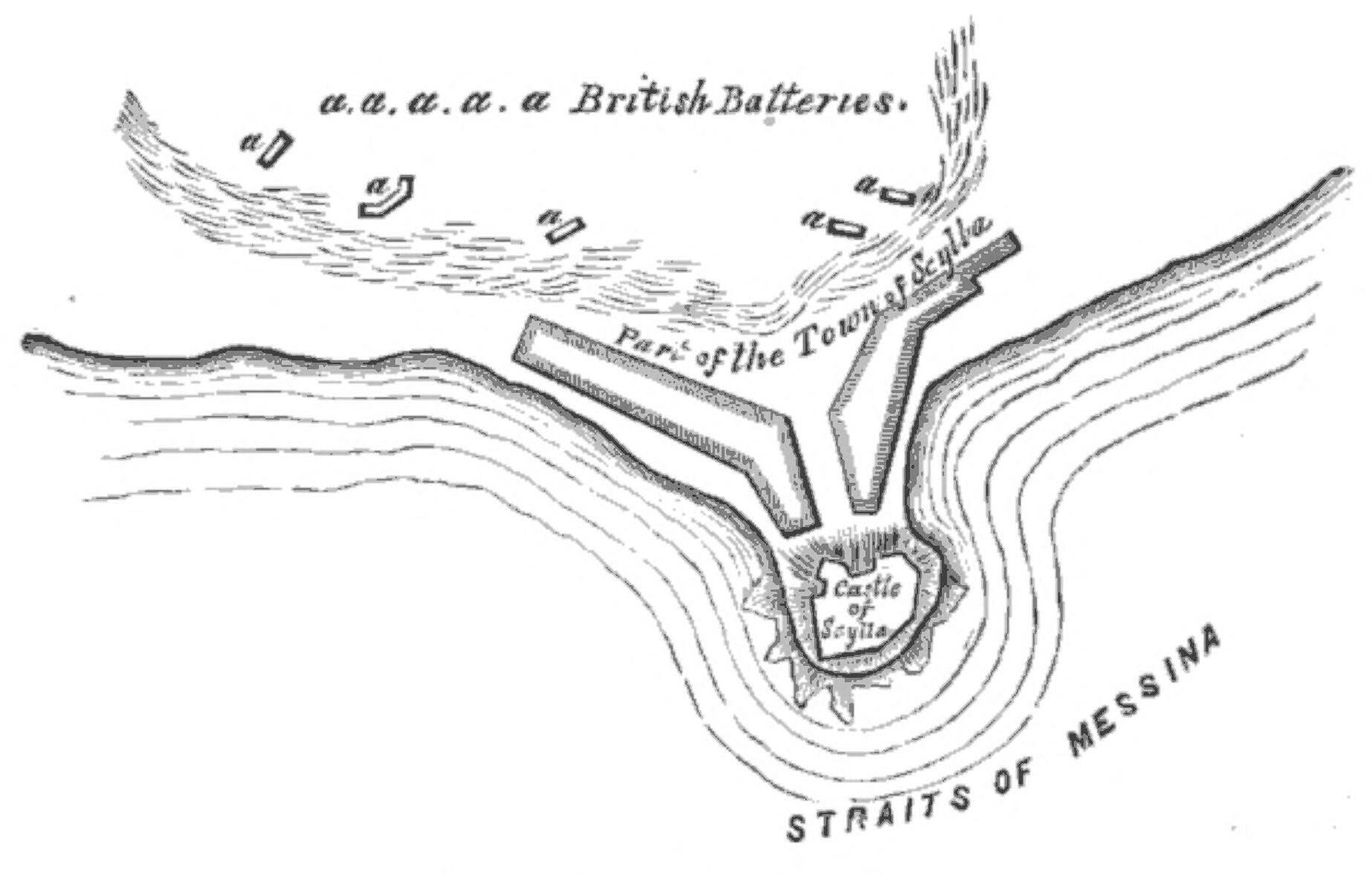
- Plan of the British attack
Date	12 – 24 July 1806
Location	Kingdom of Naples
Result	British victory

Belligerents
United Kingdom	French Empire

Commanders and leaders
(United Kingdom of Great Britain and Ireland) John Stuart (United Kingdom of Great Britain and Ireland) Sidney Smith (United Kingdom of Great Britain and Ireland) John Oswald	(First French Empire) Col. Michel

Strength
2,600	231

Casualties and losses
	3 officers 35 men

It was decided that guns should be sent for from Messina for the purpose of breaching the land front, there being at the time nothing better than twelve-pounder field guns with the force. Meanwhile a battery was to be thrown up for such guns and howitzers as were on the spot; these were to bring fire to bear on the embrasures of the casemates, and to enfilade the terrepleines of the front about to be attacked. The battery was begun on the night of the 12th; but when completed and armed it was found to be too distant for the work it was intended to perform. A new battery was therefore thrown up about 120 yards nearer, and the guns moved into it.

On the 15th Captain Charles Lefebure arrived, accompanied by three other officers. There were now present at the attack Captains Lefebure and J. T. Jones, Lieutenants Maclcod, Hoste, Lewis, and Boothby. The Commanding Engineer approved of the plans of Captain Jones, but added a third battery for the field howitzers still further in advance of the existing works. From these a heavy fire was kept up with little intermission until the 19th, when the broaching guns arrived from Messina. Two new batteries were thrown up for their reception, to the left of those already in play. These works were begun at nightfall on the 19th, and were carried on so briskly and energetically that by 11 a.m. on the following day they were ready for their guns, although the parapets had been made twenty feet thick. This rapidity of construction was due to the fact that whilst the force was waiting for the guns a quantity of materials had been accumulated on the spot to form the mass of the parapets.

On the morning of the 21st fire was opened, and by the afternoon of the 22nd much injury had been done to the escarps, and it was evident that before long a practicable breach would be established. Colonel Oswald, anxious to spare his men the hazard of an assault, now summoned the garrison, offering them the right to return to France if they would evacuate the place. This offer was accepted, and a capitulation agreed to. On the 23rd the garrison handed over the fort to the British, and embarked for France. During the few days they were under fire they had lost three officers and thirty-five men. These casualties were entirely due to the fire which had been directed against the embrasures of the casemates. Captain Jones, who saw their condition before any steps had been taken to cleanse them, reported that from the indentations on the walls, and the marks of slaughter and destruction visible on all sides, the effects of the fire must have been most disastrous to the defenders.

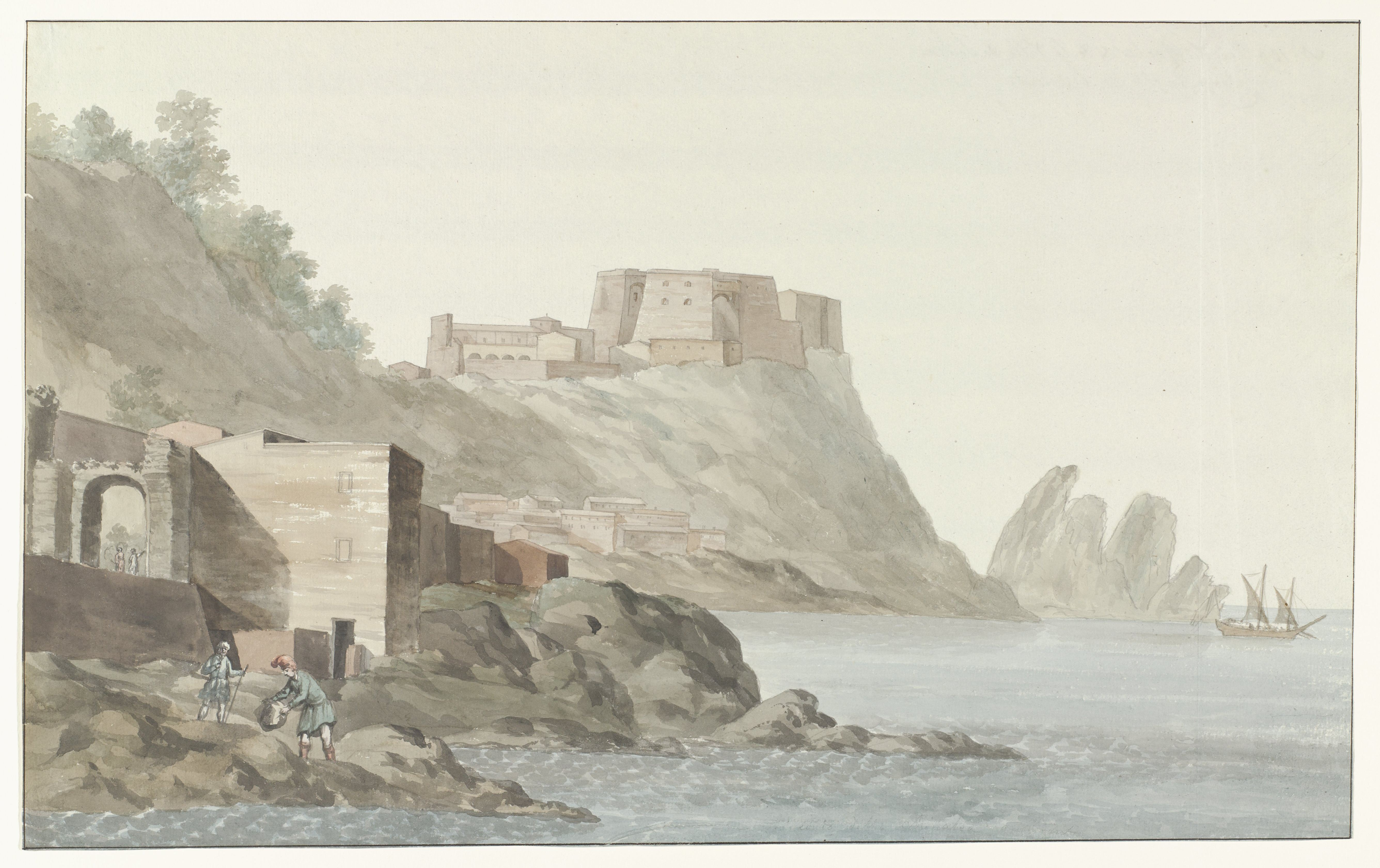
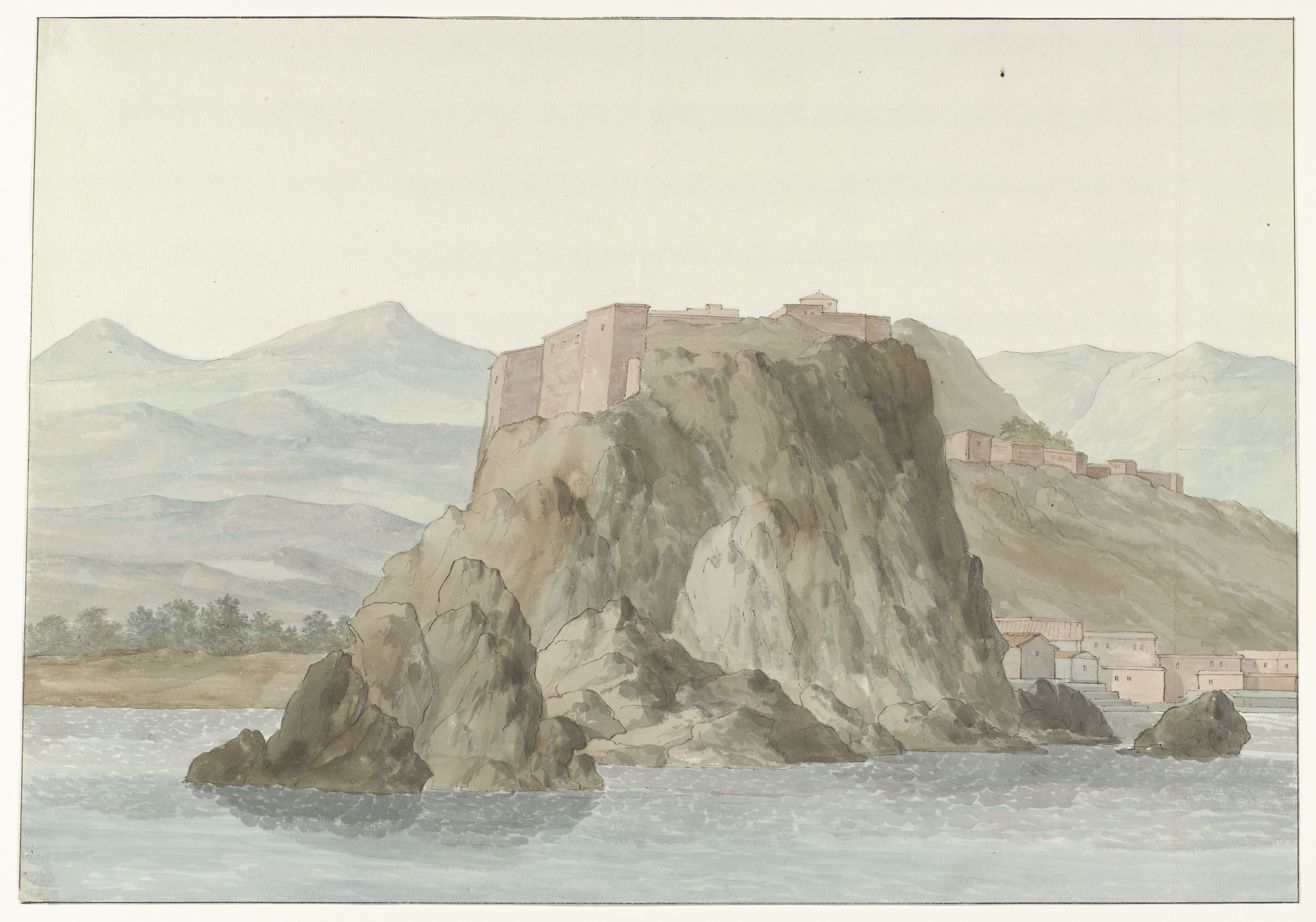
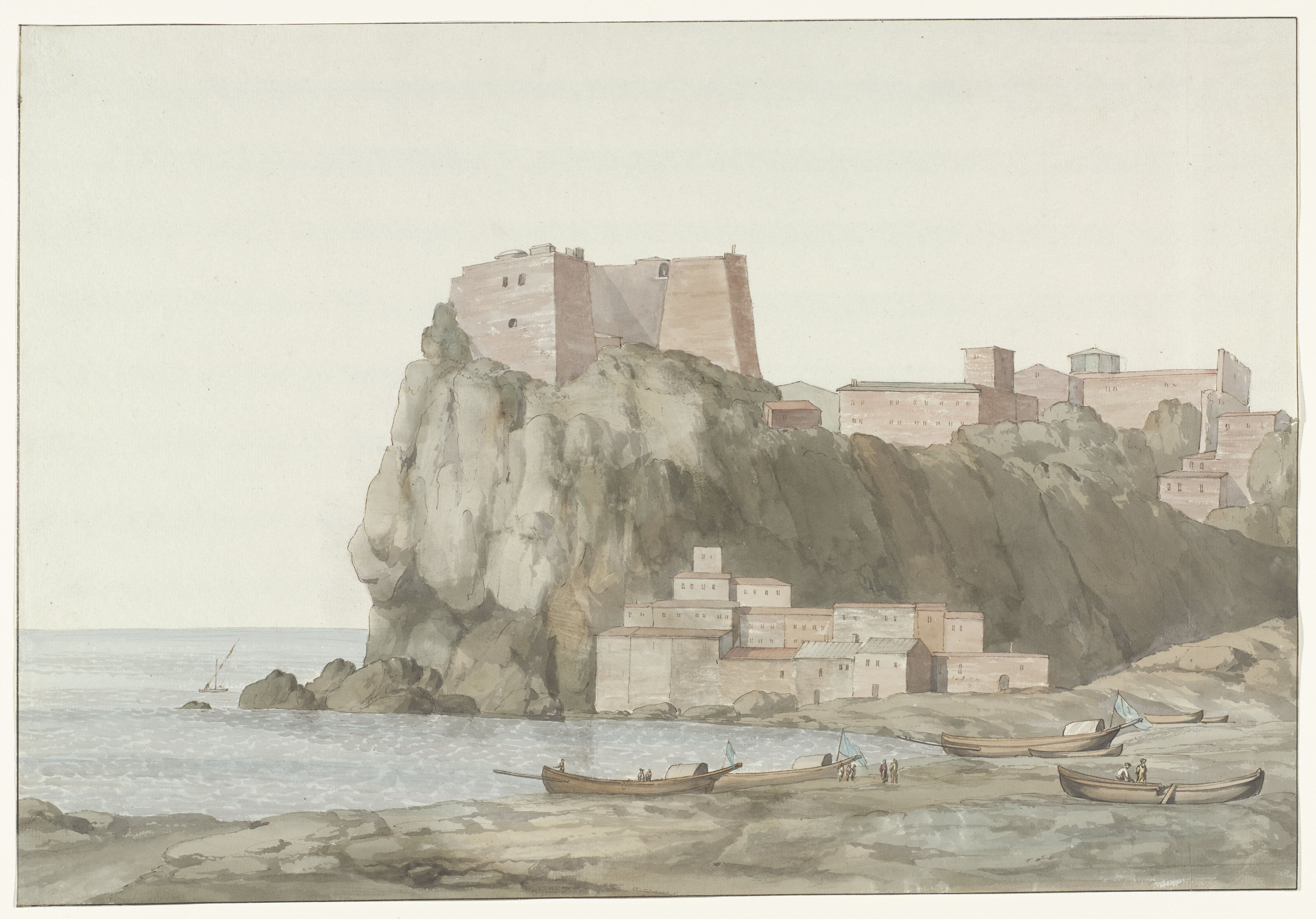
Three views of Scylla, 1778

Lieutenant Boothby, one of the officers who arrived at the siege on the 15th, with Captain Lefebure, only remained before the place for three days. On the 19th he wrote a letter to Captain Burgoyne, R.E, dated from Messina, of which the following is an extract:

Our artillery is all obliged to be dragged up a steep precipice, which of course throws upon the reduction of the place considerable difficulty. The column of infantry was accompanied only by two four-pounders, which, after a few shots, they found to be perfectly useless. Sir Sidney Smith dragged two twelves and a mortar up to a point at 700 yards distance, which was too far to be of great service; the gunboats also were of little or no use, tending, by the wildness of their fire, to encourage rather than dismay. Two six-pounders were next got up, but were too light for the service; next, two howitzers and two twelve-pounders being ready, we ran up a breastwork in the night, within 250 yards of the castle. It fell to my lot to have this job, which was rather nervous, as, had we not by the strictest silence kept undiscovered, we must have lost half the party. What favoured us also was, that they were at work in the castle, every move of which we distinctly heard. At daylight, however, I had the satisfaction to find myself well covered from musketry, of which they began from the castle a very plentiful play, which continued for about an hour and a half, until at last they were completely silenced by Dyneley with the howitzers, who threw almost every shell exactly over the spot. We had only one man wounded. All yesterday the twelve- pounders played, and knocked away a gallery which had always been full of musketry, to our great annoyance. The next step that will be taken is four twenty-four pounders within 100 yards of the castle, which certainly must bring it down. The man is extremely active and clever in his defence, and gives every proof that he is determined not to surrender until breached.

=== Aftermath ===
On 27 July Sir John Stuart arrived to decide on the fate of the castle. At this time it was the almost universal opinion that it should he destroyed, on the assumption that any garrison lodged therein must inevitably be made prisoners whenever attacked in strength. Captain Jones, however, was strongly opposed to this, and urged the retention of the fort as an advanced post to the army in Sicily. He had observed that the rock at the back of the castle on the sea side could not be seen from any of the adjacent ground, and that boats from Messina would be covered from fire when they had arrived within from 600 to 700 yards (549 to 640 m) of the fort. He therefore proposed to cut steps in the rock, by means of which the garrison could reach the water's edge and be taken off at any time should the fort be considered no longer tenable. Sir John Stuart, after a careful personal inspection, concurred in the wisdom of this advice, and decided to maintain the castle. Lieutenant Macleod was entrusted with the superintendence of the necessary work, which was successfully carried out. At the same time the land front was restored and strengthened.

== French siege ==
Second Siege of Scylla
- Part of the French invasion of Naples
Date	January 1808
Location	Kingdom of Naples
Result	French victory

Belligerents
French Empire	United Kingdom

Commanders and leaders
(First French Empire) Jean Régnier	(United Kingdom of Great Britain and Ireland) Sidney Smith

Having taken prisoner or destroyed all French garrisons between Maida and the Straits of Messina, Stuart was transported by Smith back to Sicily, where they celebrated a successful campaign in Calabria. A small British garrison was placed in the Castle of Scylla, and held it until the month of January 1808. They were then attacked by a powerful French force, under Jean Louis Régnier. The defence, under Sir Sidney Smith, was maintained until the land front was a heap of ruins. The climax was described by General Sherbrooke in his despatch of 23 February 1808:

On the morning of the 15th inst., Lieutenant-Colonel Robertson having informed me by telegraph that the parapet of the work was destroyed, and that all his guns were dismantled or disabled, I felt very anxious indeed to withdraw the troops, but a continuance of the gale rendered this impracticable until the 17th, when, during a temporary lull (every necessary arrangement having previously been made), the transport boats, protected by the men-of-war's launches, ran over from the Faros and succeeded in bringing away the whole of the garrison, who effected their retreat by the sea staircase to the boats, when they were exposed to a most galling fire of grape and musketry from the enemy till such time as they could pull out of the reach of it. (Note: This was after they had passed the 700 yards of defiladed water.) I am happy to add that the loss of the troops in this exposed situation was only four killed and five wounded, and that of the seamen one killed and ten wounded.

== Sources ==
- Johnston, Robert Matteson (1904). The Napoleonic Empire in Southern Italy and the Rise of the Secret Societies. Vol. 1. London: Macmillan and Co., Limited. pp. 2, 28, 52, 118, 128, 140, 172, 210, 239.
- Fortescue, John William (1910). A History of the British Army. Vol. 5: 1803–1807. London: Macmillan and Co., Limited. pp. 340, 358, 361.
- Schneid, Frederick C. (2002). Napoleon's Italian Campaigns: 1805–1815. Westport, Conn.: Praeger Publishers. ISBN 0-275-96875-8.
- Smith, Digby (1998). The Napoleonic Wars Data Book. London: Greenhill. ISBN 1-85367-276-9.

Attribution:
