= Filiberto =

Filiberto is a given name and a surname. It derives from a Germanic name, Latinized in Filibertus and came to Italy through the French. It is composed of the roots filu, "much", and beraht or berhta, "illustrious", "brilliant", and means "very bright" or "very illustrious". Its diffusion in Italy is linked to the fact of being a traditional name of the House of Savoy. The French form Philibert originated by alteration with the Greek φιλος (philos), "beloved".

Notable people with the name include:

== Given name ==
- Emmanuel Philibert of Savoy (disambiguation) (Italian: Emanuele Filiberto di Savoia), name of several members of the House of Savoy
- Filiberto Avogadro di Collobiano (1797–1868), Italian courtier and politician
- Filiberto Azcuy (born 1972), Cuban Olympic wrestler
- Filiberto Colon (born 1966), Puerto Rican Olympic swimmer
- Filiberto Fernández (born 1972), Mexican Olympic wrestler
- Filiberto Ferrero (1500–1549), Italian Roman Catholic cardinal
- Filiberto Laurenzi (1618–...), Italian composer and harpsichordist
- Filiberto Hernández Martínez (born 1971), Mexican serial killer
- Filiberto Marco (born 1951), Spanish rower
- Filiberto Menna (1926–1989), Italian art critic, art theorist, art historian, and academic
- Filiberto Mercado (born 1938), Mexican Olympic cyclist
- Filiberto Rodríguez Motamayor (1867–1915), Venezuelan writer, lawyer and poet
- Filiberto Penados (born 1971), Belizean education and indigenous studies scholar
- Filiberto Petiti (1845–1925), Italian landscape painter
- Filiberto Ojeda Ríos (1933–2005), Puerto Rican leader of the Macheteros
- Filiberto Rivera (born 1982), Puerto Rican basketball player
- Filiberto Scarpelli (1870–1933), Italian cartoonist, caricaturist, illustrator and journalist
- Prince Filiberto, Duke of Genoa (1895–1990), Italian duke of Genoa and member of the House of Savoy
- Rafael Filiberto Bonnelly (1904–1979), Dominican lawyer, scholar and president of the Dominican Republic, 1962–1963

== Surname ==
- Juan de Dios Filiberto (1885–1964), Argentine violinist, conductor, poet and composer

== See also ==
- Italian battleship Emanuele Filiberto (1893–1920), Italian pre-dreadnought battleship
- 2nd Cavalry Division "Emanuele Filiberto Testa di Ferro" (1930–1943), a military unit of Italy in World War II
- Italian cruiser Emanuele Filiberto Duca d'Aosta (1932–1959), Italian light cruiser warship
