= Italian battleship Ammiraglio di Saint Bon =

Pre-dreadnought battleship of the Italian Royal Navy

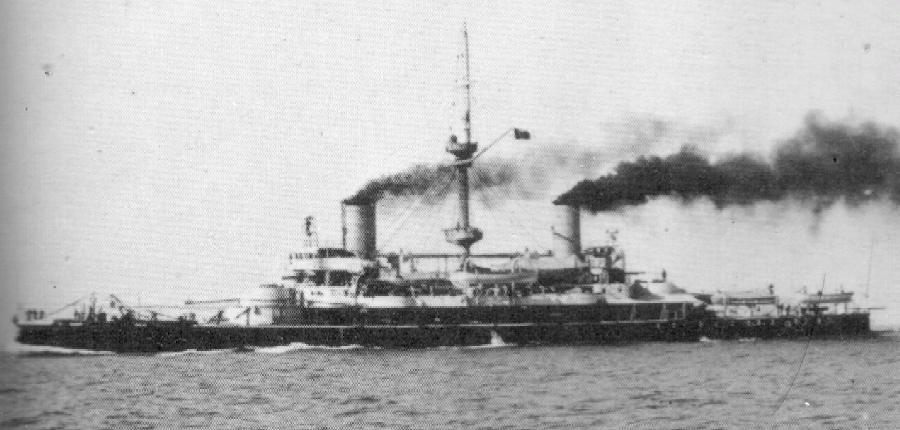
- Ammiraglio di Saint Bon underway

History

Italy
- Name: Ammiraglio di Saint Bon
- Namesake: Simone Antonio Saint-Bon
- Operator: Regia Marina
- Builder: Venetian Arsenal
- Laid down: 18 July 1893
- Launched: 29 April 1897
- Completed: 24 May 1901
- Commissioned: 1 February 1901
- Stricken: 18 June 1920
- Fate: Scrapped

General characteristics
- Class & type: Ammiraglio di Saint Bon-class battleship
- Displacement: Normal: 10,082 long tons (10,244 t); Full load: 10,531 long tons (10,700 t)
- Length: 111.8 m (366 ft 10 in)
- Beam: 21.12 m (69 ft 3 in)
- Draft: 7.69 m (25 ft 3 in)
- Installed power: 12 × fire-tube boilers; 14,296 ihp (10,661 kW)
- Propulsion: 2 × triple-expansion steam engines; 2 × screw propellers
- Speed: 18.3 knots (33.9 km/h; 21.1 mph)
- Range: 5,500 nmi (10,200 km; 6,300 mi) at 10 knots (19 km/h; 12 mph)
- Complement: 557
- Armament: 4 × 254 mm (10 in) guns; 8 × 152 mm (6 in) guns; 8 × 120 mm (4.7 in) guns; 8 × 57 mm (2.24 in) six-pounder guns; 2 × 37 mm (1.5 in) guns; 4 × 450 mm (17.7 in) torpedo tubes
- Armor: Belt and side: 249 mm (9.8 in); Deck: 70 mm (2.75 in); Turrets: 249 mm (9.8 in); Conning tower: 249 mm (9.8 in); Casemates: 150 mm (5.9 in)

Ammiraglio di Saint Bon was a pre-dreadnought battleship of the Italian Regia Marina (Royal Navy) built during the 1890s. She was laid down in July 1893, launched in April 1897, and completed in May 1901. She was the lead ship of her class, and had one sister ship, Emanuele Filiberto. The ship was armed with a main battery of four 254 mm (10 in) guns and was capable of a top speed of 18 knots (33 km/h; 21 mph).

Ammiraglio di Saint Bon served in the active squadron of the Italian navy for the first several years of her career. She was assigned to the 3rd Division during the Italo-Turkish War of 1911–1912. During the war, she was involved in the seizure of the island of Rhodes, where she provided gunfire support to Italian infantry. The ship was obsolescent by World War I and was slated to be broken up in 1914–1915, but the need for warships granted Ammiraglio di Saint Bon a reprieve. She spent the war as a harbor defense ship in Venice and, after April 1916, was used primarily as a floating anti-aircraft battery. She was stricken from the naval register in June 1920 and subsequently broken up for scrap.

== Design ==
Plan and profile drawing of the Ammiraglio di Saint Bon class

Ammiraglio di Saint Bon was 111.8 meters (366 ft 10 in) long overall, and had a beam of 21.12 m (69 ft 3 in) and a maximum draft of 7.69 m (25 ft 3 in). She displaced 10,082 long tons (10,244 t) normally and up to 10,531 long tons (10,700 t) at full load. The ship had an inverted bow with a ram below the waterline. She was fitted with a single heavy military mast placed amidships, which was equipped with fighting tops for some of the light guns. Ammiraglio di Saint Bon had a crew of 557 officers and enlisted men.

Her propulsion system consisted of two triple expansion engines driving a pair of screw propellers. Steam for the engines was provided by twelve coal-fired cylindrical fire-tube boilers, which were vented through a pair of funnels on either end of the mast. The ship's propulsion system was rated to provide a top speed of 18.3 knots (33.9 km/h; 21.1 mph) from 14,296 indicated horsepower (10,661 kW). She had a range of approximately 5,500 nautical miles (10,200 km; 6,300 mi) at a more economical cruising speed of 10 knots (19 km/h; 12 mph).

As built, the ship was armed with a main battery of four 254 mm (10 in) 40-caliber guns placed in two twin gun turrets, one forward and one aft. She was also equipped with a secondary battery of eight 152 mm (6 in) 40-cal. guns in individual casemates amidships, and eight 120 mm (4.7 in) 40-cal. guns in shielded pivot mounts directly above the casemate battery. The ship's gun armament was rounded out by eight 57 mm (2.24 in) guns and two 37 mm (1.5 in) guns, which provided close-range defense against torpedo boats. Ammiraglio di Saint Bon also carried four 450 mm (17.7 in) torpedo tubes in deck-mounted launchers.

The ship was protected by Harvey steel. The main belt was 249 mm (9.8 in) thick, and the deck was 70 mm (2.75 in) thick. The conning tower was protected by 249 mm of armor plating. The main battery guns had 249 mm thick plating, and the casemates were 150 mm (5.9 in) thick.

== Service ==
Ammiraglio di Saint Bon sometime before 1905

Ammiraglio di Saint Bon was built by the Venice Naval Shipyard. She was laid down on 18 July 1893 and launched on 29 April 1897, after which her fitting out took place. The ship began her sea trials in January 1901 off La Spezia, and was commissioned on 1 February. Her preliminary full-power trials began on 5 May, during which she reached 19.2 knots (35.6 km/h; 22.1 mph). Her official speed trials took place on 23 May, where she reached a top speed of 18.5 knots (34.3 km/h; 21.3 mph). Her trials were completed the following day.

The ship spent the first several years of her career in the 1st Squadron, along with her sister Emanuele Filiberto, the three Re Umberto-class ironclads, and the two Regina Margherita-class battleships. In 1902–1903, Ammiraglio di Saint Bon was in the main Italian fleet with the three Re Umbertos and two of the Ruggiero di Lauria-class ironclads; while in their normal peacetime training routine, the ships of the main fleet were kept in commission for exercises for seven months of the year. For the remaining five months, they were kept in a partial state of readiness with reduced crews. In October 1906, Ammiraglio di Saint Bon participated in major fleet maneuvers under the command of Vice Admiral Alfonso di Brochetti in the Ionian Sea. The exercises lasted from 10 to 26 October. The maneuvers culminated in a mock attack by the Italian fleet on the harbor defenses at Taranto. During the 1908 maneuvers, Ammiraglio di Sashiint Bon served in the hostile squadron, tasked with attacking the friendly squadron, where her sister was assigned.

=== Italo-Turkish War ===
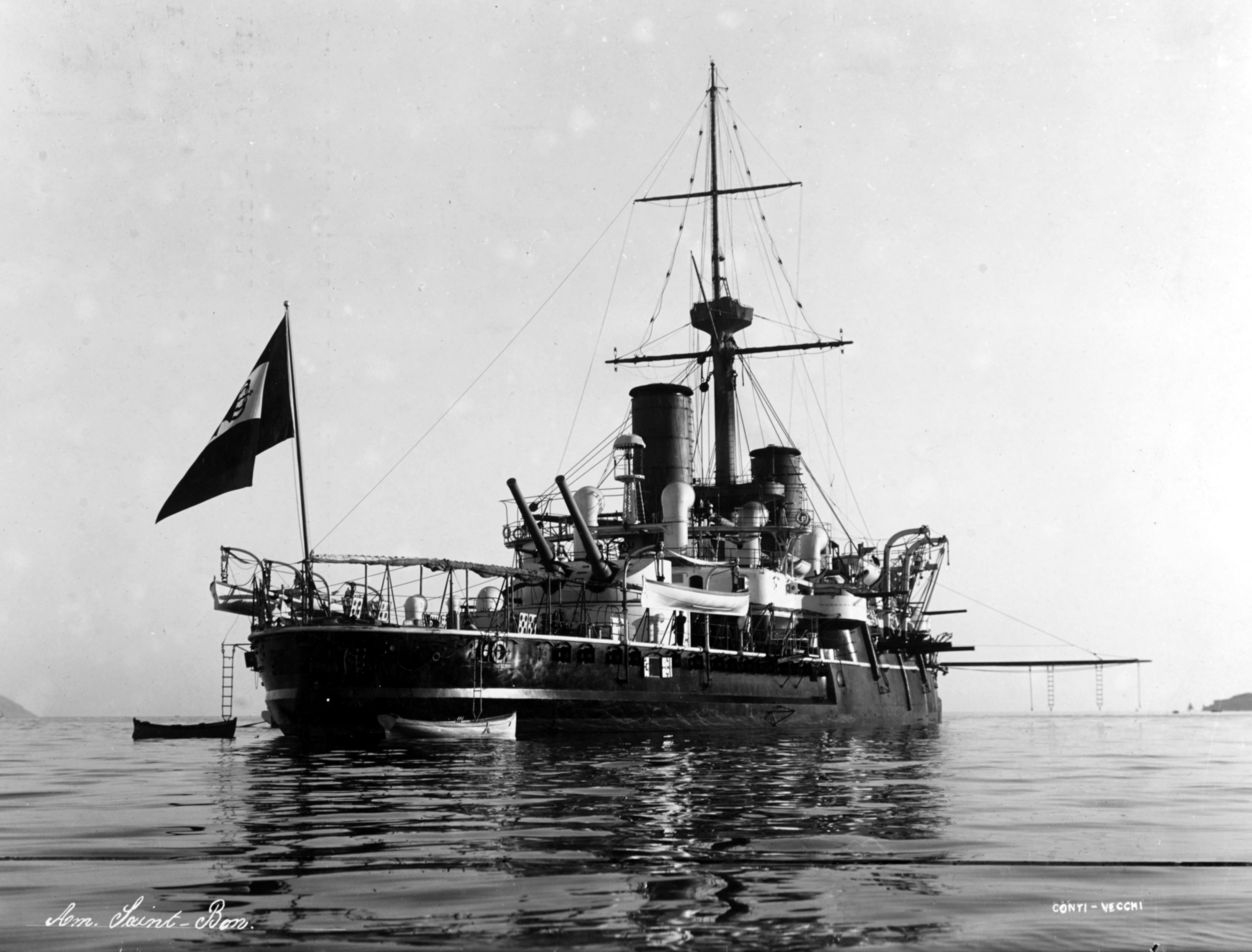
Ammiraglio di Saint Bon circa 1900

On 29 September 1911, Italy declared war on the Ottoman Empire in order to seize Libya. Ammiraglio di Saint Bon initially served in the 3rd Division of the 2nd Squadron, but was soon transferred to the Division of the Torpedo Boat Inspector, commanded by Rear Admiral Prince Luigi Amedeo. On 3 October, Amedeo steamed to Preveza aboard the armored cruiser Vettor Pisani to demand the surrender of the port after the Battle of Preveza. Ammiraglio di Saint Bon accompanied him, and was to bombard the city if the Ottoman commander refused Amedeo's ultimatum, but foreign pressure, particularly from Austria-Hungary, forced the Italian government to recall Amedeo and halt further operations in the Ionian Sea.

The ship was not heavily involved in the fighting in North Africa in the first months of the war and, in December, was transferred to Italy. On 13 April 1912, Ammiraglio di Saint Bon and the rest of the division sailed from Tobruk to the Aegean Sea to rendezvous with the 1st Division. The two divisions met on 17 April off the island of Stampalia, after which the combined fleet steamed north. The following day, the ships cut submarine telegraph cables between Imbros, Tenedos, Lemnos, Salonica, and the Dardanelles. They then steamed to the entrance to the Dardanelles in an attempt to lure out the Ottoman fleet. When the Ottoman coastal fortifications began to take the Italian ships under fire, the Italians returned fire and inflicted serious damage on them. On 19 April, Ammiraglio di Saint Bon and most of the fleet returned to Italy, leaving only Pisa, Amalfi, and a flotilla of torpedo boats to cruise off the Ottoman coast.

On 30 April 1912, Ammiraglio di Saint Bon and the rest of the 3rd Division escorted a convoy of troopships from Tobruk to the island of Rhodes. The Italian heavy ships demonstrated off the city of Rhodes, while the transports landed the expeditionary force 10 miles (16 km) to the south on 4 May; the soldiers quickly advanced on the city, supported by artillery fire from the Italian fleet. The Turks surrendered the city the following day. While the Italian troops completed the conquest of the island, Ammiraglio di Saint Bon bombarded Ottoman positions in support of the Italian offensive. Toward the end of May, the 3rd Division returned to Italy. In July, Ammiraglio di Saint Bon and the rest of the division had withdrawn to Italy to replace worn-out gun barrels, along with other repairs. By October, the Ottomans had agreed to sign a peace treaty to end the war. After the war, Ammiraglio di Saint Bon had six searchlights installed on platforms abreast the funnels and the mast. A rangefinder was also added on top of the conning tower.

In 1913, Ammiraglio di Saint Bon participated in an international naval demonstration in the Ionian Sea to protest the Balkan Wars. Ships from other navies included in the demonstration were the British pre-dreadnought HMS King Edward VII, the Austro-Hungarian pre-dreadnought SMS Zrínyi, the French armored cruiser Edgar Quinet, and the German light cruiser SMS Breslau. The most important action of the combined flotilla, which was under the command of British Admiral Cecil Burney, was to blockade the Montenegrin coast. The goal of the blockade was to prevent Serbian reinforcements from supporting the siege at Scutari, where Montenegro had besieged a combined force of Albanians and Ottomans. Pressured by the international blockade, Serbia withdrew its army from Scutari, which was subsequently occupied by a joint Allied ground force.

=== World War I ===
Italy declared her neutrality after the outbreak of World War I in August 1914 but, by July 1915, the Triple Entente had convinced the Italians to enter the war against the Central Powers. Nevertheless, the outbreak of war prompted Italy to retain Ammiraglio di Saint Bon and her sister, which had been scheduled for disposal in 1914–1915. The Austro-Hungarian Navy, Italy's traditional naval rival, was the primary opponent in the conflict. The Italian Naval Chief of Staff, Admiral Paolo Thaon di Revel, believed that an active fleet policy was prohibited by the serious threat from submarines in the confined waters of the Adriatic Sea. Instead, Revel decided to implement blockade at the southern end of the Adriatic with the battle fleet, while smaller vessels, such as the MAS boats, conducted raids on Austro-Hungarian ships and installations. Meanwhile, Revel's capital ships would be preserved to confront the Austro-Hungarian battle fleet in the event that it sought a decisive engagement. As a result, the ship was not particularly active during the war.

From the onset of Italian participation in the war, Ammiraglio di Saint Bon was used as a harbor defense ship in Venice, along with her sister and the old ironclad Sardegna, as well as two cruisers and several smaller craft. After April 1916, Ammiraglio di Saint Bon was used as a floating anti-aircraft battery to defend Venice. She continued in this role until the end of the war in November 1918. The ship remained in the Italian Navy's inventory for only a short time after the end of the war; she was stricken from the naval register on 18 June 1920 and subsequently broken up for scrap.
