= Italian battleship Emanuele Filiberto =

Pre-dreadnought battleship of the Italian Royal Navy

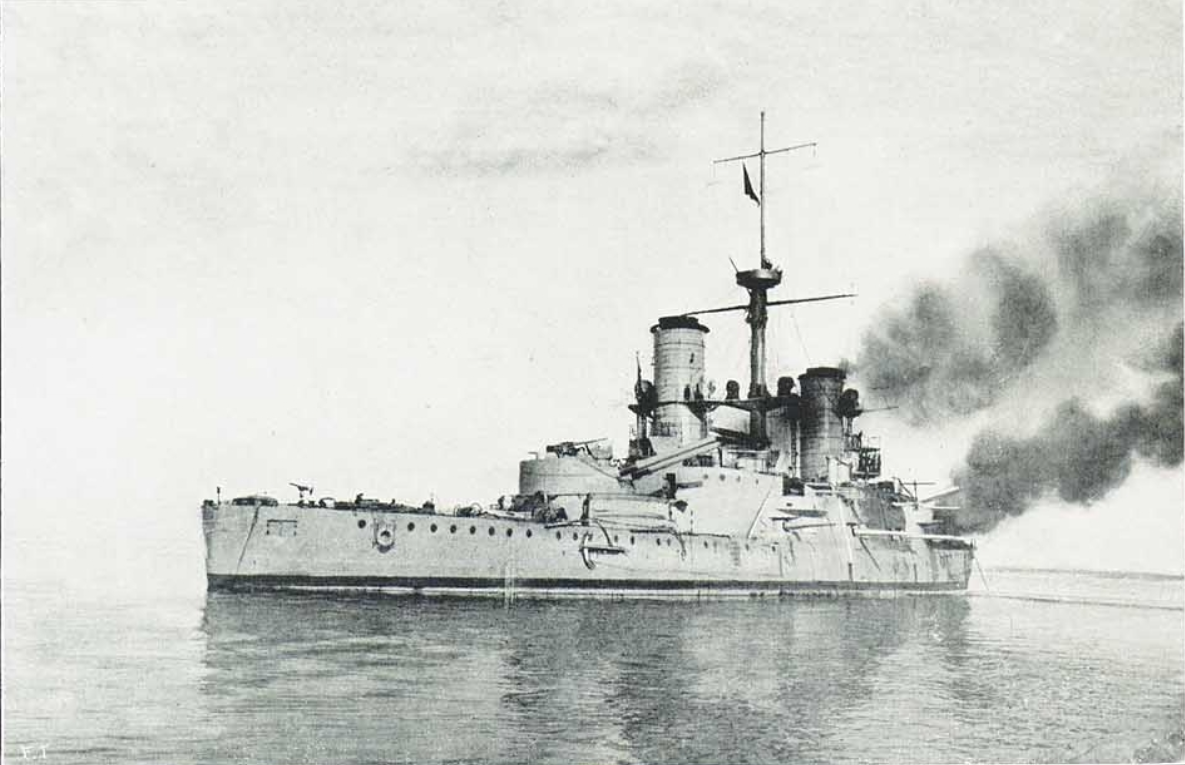
- Emanuele Filiberto firing her main battery

History

Italy
- Name: Emanuele Filiberto
- Namesake: Prince Emanuele Filiberto, Duke of Aosta
- Operator: Regia Marina
- Builder: Regio Cantiere di Castellammare di Stabia
- Laid down: 5 October 1893
- Launched: 29 September 1897
- Completed: 16 April 1902
- Commissioned: 6 September 1901
- Stricken: 29 March 1920

General characteristics
- Class & type: Ammiraglio di Saint Bon-class battleship
- Displacement: Normal: 9,645 long tons (9,800 t); Full load: 9,940 long tons (10,100 t)
- Length: 111.8 m (366 ft 10 in)
- Beam: 21.12 m (69 ft 3 in)
- Draft: 7.27 m (23 ft 10 in)
- Installed power: 12 × fire-tube boilers; 13,522 ihp (10,083 kW)
- Propulsion: 2 × triple-expansion steam engines; 2 × screw propellers
- Speed: 18.1 knots (33.5 km/h; 20.8 mph)
- Range: 5,500 nmi (10,200 km; 6,300 mi) at 10 knots (19 km/h; 12 mph)
- Complement: 565
- Armament: 4 × 254 mm (10 in) guns; 8 × 152 mm (6 in) guns; 8 × 120 mm (4.7 in) guns; 6 x 76 mm (3 in); 8 × 47 mm (1.9 in) six-pounder guns; 4 × 450 mm (17.7 in) torpedo tubes
- Armor: Belt: 249 mm (9.8 in); Deck: 69.9 mm (2.75 in); Turrets: 249 mm (9.8 in); Conning tower: 249 mm (9.8 in); Casemates: 150 mm (5.9 in)

The Emanuele Filiberto was a pre-dreadnought battleship built for the Italian Regia Marina (Royal Navy) during the 1890s. Her keel was laid down in October 1893 and she was launched in September 1897; work was completed in April 1902. She had one sister ship, Ammiraglio di Saint Bon, the lead ship of the Ammiraglio di Saint Bon class. She was armed with a main battery of four 254 mm (10 in) guns and was capable of a speed in excess of 18 knots (33 km/h; 21 mph).

Emanuele Filiberto served in the active squadron of the Italian navy for the first several years of her career. She was assigned to the 3rd Division during the Italo-Turkish War of 1911–1912. During the war, she was involved in the assaults on Tripoli in North Africa and on the island of Rhodes in the eastern Mediterranean Sea. She was obsolescent by World War I and was slated to be broken up in 1914–1915, but the need for warships granted Emanuele Filiberto a respite. She spent the war as a harbor defense ship in Venice. She was stricken from the naval register in June 1920 and subsequently broken up for scrap.

== Design ==
Plan and profile drawing of the Ammiraglio di Saint Bon class

Emanuele Filiberto was 111.8 meters (366 ft 10 in) long overall and had a beam of 21.12 m (69 ft 3 in) and a maximum draft of 7.27 m (23 ft 10 in). She displaced 9,645 long tons (9,800 t) normally and up to 9,940 long tons (10,100 t) at full load. The ship had an inverted bow with a ram below the waterline. She was fitted with a single heavy military mast placed amidships, which was equipped with fighting tops for some of the light guns. Emanuele Filiberto had a crew of 565 officers and enlisted men.

Her propulsion system consisted of two triple expansion engines driving a pair of screw propellers. Steam for the engines was provided by twelve coal-fired cylindrical fire-tube boilers, which were vented through a pair of funnels on either end of the mast. The ship's propulsion system was rated to provide a top speed of 18.1 knots (34 km/h; 21 mph) from 13,522 indicated horsepower (10,083 kW). She had a range of approximately 5,500 nautical miles (10,200 km; 6,300 mi) at a more economical cruising speed of 10 knots (19 km/h; 12 mph).

As built, the ship was armed with a main battery of four 254 mm (10 in) 40-caliber guns placed in two twin gun turrets, one forward and one aft. The ship was also equipped with a secondary battery of eight 152 mm (6 in) 40-cal. guns in individual casemates amidships. She was also equipped with six 76 mm (3 in) 40-cal. guns in shielded pivot mounts directly above the casemate battery. The ship's gun armament was rounded out by eight 47 mm (1.9 in) guns, which provided close-range defense against torpedo boats. Emanuele Filiberto also carried four 450 mm (17.7 in) torpedo tubes in deck-mounted launchers.

The ship was protected with Harvey steel. The main belt was 249 mm (9.8 in) thick, and the deck was 70 mm (2.75 in) thick. The conning tower was protected by 249 mm of armor plating. The main battery guns had 249 mm thick plating, and the casemates were 150 mm (5.9 in) thick.

== Service ==
Emanuele Filiberto was named after Prince Emanuele Filiberto, Duke of Aosta. She was built by the Regio Cantiere di Castellammare di Stabia (Royal Shipyard in Castellammare di Stabia), Naples. She was laid down on 5 October 1893 and was launched on 29 September 1897. In September 1900, the ship began her sea trials off Naples; during the tests, Emanuele Filiberto maintained a speed of 18 knots (33 km/h; 21 mph) for a two-hour period. She was commissioned on 6 September 1901, but final work on the vessel was not completed until 16 April 1902.

The ship spent the first several years of her career in the 1st Squadron, along with her sister Ammiraglio di Saint Bon, the three Re Umberto-class ironclads, and the two Regina Margherita-class battleships. In 1902–1903, Emanuele Filiberto was in the main Italian fleet with her sister, the three Re Umbertos and two of the Ruggiero di Lauria-class ironclads; while in their normal peacetime training routine, the ships of the main fleet were kept in commission for exercises for seven months of the year. For the remaining five months, they were kept in a partial state of readiness with reduced crews. In October 1906, the ship participated in major fleet maneuvers under the command of Vice Admiral Alfonso di Brochetti in the Ionian Sea. The exercises lasted from 10 to 26 October. The maneuvers culminated in a mock attack by the Italian fleet on the harbor defenses at Taranto. During the 1908 maneuvers, Emanuele Filiberto served in the friendly squadron, while Ammiraglio de Saint Bon was assigned to the hostile squadron.

=== Italo-Turkish War ===
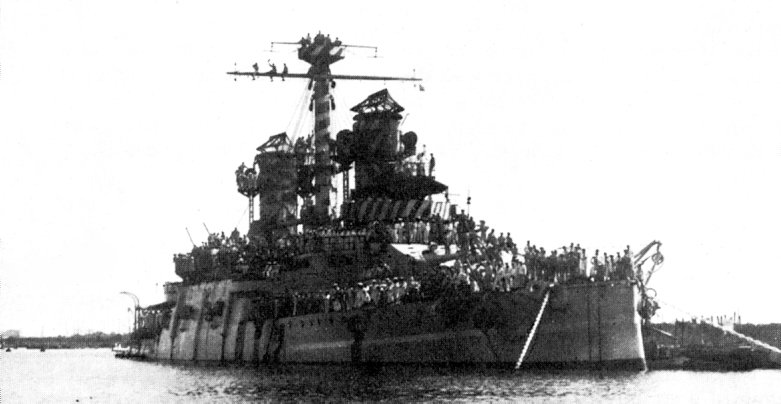
Emanuele Filiberto

On 29 September 1911, Italy declared war on the Ottoman Empire in order to seize Libya. Emanuele Filiberto served in the 3rd Division, which she joined on 30 September. She served alongside Ammiraglio di Saint Bon and the two Regina Margherita-class battleships. The ship took part in the bombardment of the fortresses defending Tripoli on 3 October. Italian soldiers went ashore two days later, and by the 11th, they had taken the city. In December, she was stationed in Italy.

On 13 April 1912, Emanuele Filiberto and the rest of the 3rd Division sailed from Tobruk to the Aegean Sea to rendezvous with the 1st Division. The two units met on 17 April off the island of Stampalia, after which the combined fleet steamed north. The following day, the ships cut submarine telegraph cables between Imbros, Tenedos, Lemnos, Salonica, and the Dardanelles. Most of the fleet bombarded the fortresses protecting the Dardanelles; in the meantime, Emanuele Filiberto and the destroyer Ostro steamed to the port of Vathy on the island of Samos and bombarded the Ottoman army barracks there. Ostro then torpedoed an Ottoman gunboat in the harbor, after which the Italian ships left. On 19 April, Emanuele Filiberto and most of the fleet returned to Italy, leaving only Pisa, Amalfi, and a flotilla of torpedo boats to cruise off the Ottoman coast.

On 30 April, Emanuele Filiberto and the rest of the 3rd Division escorted a convoy of troopships from Tobruk to the island of Rhodes. The Italian heavy ships demonstrated off the city of Rhodes while the transports landed the expeditionary force 10 miles (16 km) to the south on 4 May; the soldiers quickly advanced on the city, supported by artillery fire from the Italian fleet. The Turks surrendered the city the following day. Toward the end of May, the 3rd Division returned to Italy. In July, Emanuele Filiberto and the rest of the division had withdrawn to Italy to replace worn-out gun barrels, along with other repairs. By October, the Ottomans had agreed to sign a peace treaty to end the war.

=== World War I ===
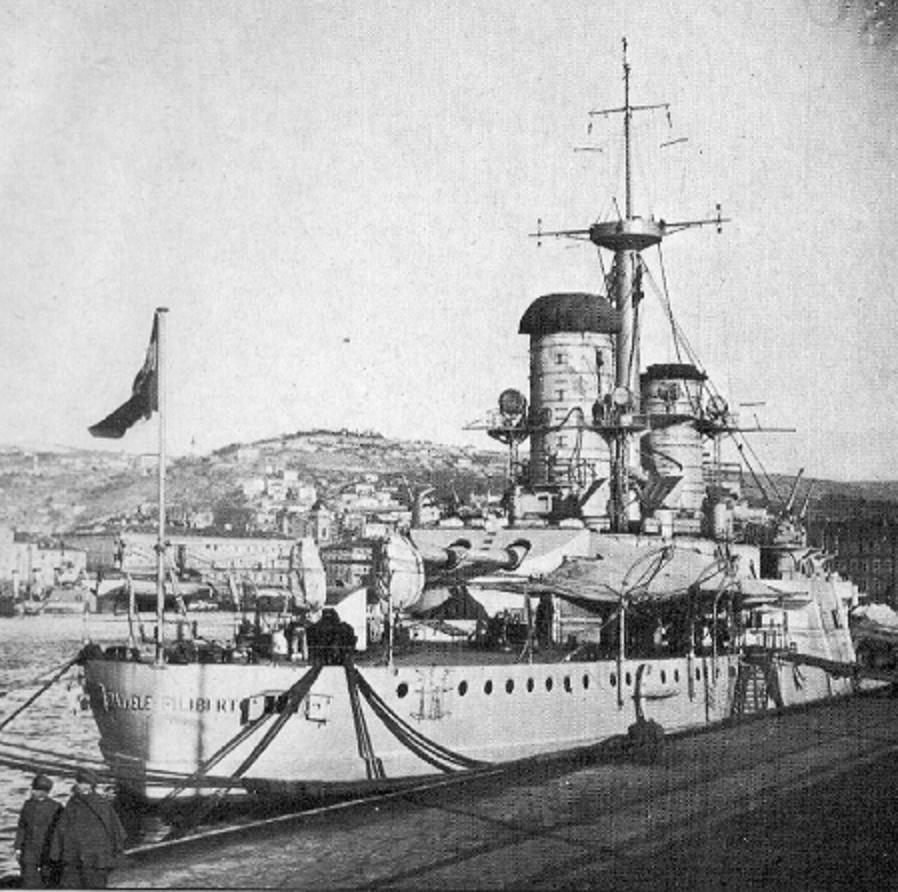
Emanuele Filiberto at Fiume in late 1918 after the end of World War I

Italy declared neutrality after the outbreak of World War I in August 1914, but by July 1915, the Triple Entente had convinced the Italians to enter the war against the Central Powers with promises of territory acquisition in Italia irredenta. The Austro-Hungarian Navy, which had been Italy's primary rival for decades, was the main opponent in the conflict. The Austro-Hungarian battle fleet lay in its harbors directly across the narrow Adriatic Sea. Admiral Paolo Thaon di Revel, the Italian Naval Chief of Staff, believed that Austro-Hungarian submarines and minelayers could operate very effectively in the narrow waters of the Adriatic. The threat from these underwater weapons to his capital ships was too serious for him to use the fleet in an active way. Instead, Revel decided to implement a blockade at the relatively safer southern end of the Adriatic with the battle fleet, while smaller vessels, such as the MAS boats, conducted raids on Austro-Hungarian ships and installations. Meanwhile, Revel's battleships would be preserved to confront the Austro-Hungarian battle fleet in the event that it sought a decisive engagement. As a result, Emanuele Filiberto and the rest of the Italian battle fleet did not see significant action during the war.

Once Italy entered the war, Emanuele Filiberto was used as a harbor defense ship in Venice to protect the port from Austrian naval attacks. She was aided in this task by her sister and the old ironclad Sardegna, along with two cruisers and several smaller craft. The ship remained in the Italian Navy's inventory for only a short time after the end of the war in 1918, and she was stricken from the naval register on 29 March 1920 and subsequently broken up for scrap.
