= Italian battleship Regina Margherita =

Pre-dreadnought battleship of the Italian Royal Navy

Coordinates: 40.438°N 19.411°E

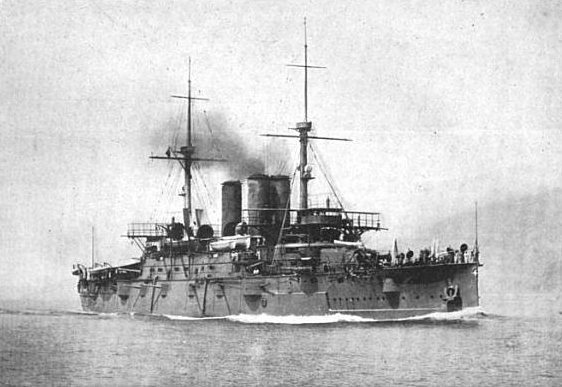
- Regina Margherita on speed trials in July 1904

History

Italy
- Name: Regina Margherita
- Namesake: Margherita of Savoy
- Builder: Arsenale di La Spezia
- Laid down: 20 November 1898
- Launched: 30 May 1901
- Completed: 14 April 1904
- Fate: Sunk by mines 11 December 1916

General characteristics
- Type: Regina Margherita-class battleship
- Displacement: Normal: 13,215 long tons (13,427 t); Full load: 14,093 long tons (14,319 t)
- Length: 138.65 m (454 ft 11 in)
- Beam: 23.84 m (78 ft 3 in)
- Draft: 9 m (29 ft 6 in)
- Installed power: 28 × Niclausse boilers; 21,790 ihp (16,249 kW)
- Propulsion: 2 × triple-expansion steam engines; 2 × screw propellers
- Speed: 20 knots (37 km/h; 23 mph)
- Range: 10,000 nmi (18,520 km; 11,508 mi) at 10 kn (19 km/h; 12 mph)
- Complement: 812–900
- Armament: 4 × 305 mm (12 in)/40 guns; 4 × 203 mm (8 in)/45 guns; 12 × 152 mm (6 in)/40 guns; 20 × 76 mm (3 in)/40 guns; 2 × 47 mm (1.9 in)/40 guns; 2 × 37 mm (1.5 in)/40 guns; 4 × 450 mm (17.7 in) torpedo tubes
- Armor: Belt and side: 152 mm; Deck: 79 mm (3.1 in); Turrets: 203 mm; Conning tower: 152 mm; Casemates: 152 mm

Regina Margherita was the lead ship of her class of pre-dreadnought battleships built for the Italian Regia Marina between 1898 and 1904. She was armed with a main battery of four 305 mm (12 in) guns and had a top speed of 20 knots (37 km/h; 23 mph). She had one sister ship, Benedetto Brin.

After entering service, Regina Margherita was assigned to the Mediterranean Squadron of the Italian fleet. In her early years in service, she took part in routine training exercises. The ship saw action in the Italo-Turkish War of 1911–1912, bombarding Ottoman positions. By the outbreak of World War I in 1914, Regina Margherita had been reduced to a training ship. She struck two naval mines on the night of 11–12 December 1916 while steaming off Valona. She sank with heavy loss of life: 675 men were killed, and only 270 survived.

== Design ==
Plan and profile drawing of the Regina Margherita class

Regina Margherita was 138.65 meters (454 ft 11 in) long overall and had a beam of 23.84 m (78 ft 3 in) and a draft of 8.81 m (28 ft 11 in). She displaced 13,215 long tons (13,427 t) normally and up to 14,093 long tons (14,319 t) at full load. The ship had a flush deck and an inverted bow with a ram below the waterline. Regina Margherita had a crew that varied between 812 and 900 officers and enlisted men.

Her propulsion system consisted of two triple expansion steam engines that drove a pair of screw propellers. Steam for the engines was provided by twenty-eight coal-fired Niclausse boilers, which were vented into three funnels, two of which were placed side by side. The ship's propulsion system provided a top speed of 20.3 knots (37.6 km/h; 23.4 mph) from 21,790 indicated horsepower (16,249 kW), and a range of approximately 10,000 nautical miles (19,000 km; 12,000 mi) at 10 knots (19 km/h; 12 mph).

As built, the ship was armed with a main battery of four 305 mm (12 in) 40-caliber guns placed in two twin gun turrets, one forward and one aft. The ship was also equipped with a secondary battery of four 203 mm (8 in) 40-cal. guns in casemates in the superstructure, and twelve 152 mm (6 in) 40-cal. guns, also in casemates in the side of the hull. Close-range defense against torpedo boats was provided by a battery of twenty 76 mm (3 in) 40-cal. guns. The ship also carried a pair of 47 mm (1.9 in) guns, two 37 mm (1.5 in) guns, and two 10 mm (0.4 in) Maxim guns. Regina Margherita was also equipped with four 450 mm (18 in) torpedo tubes placed in the hull below the waterline.

Regina Margherita was protected with Harvey steel manufactured in Terni. The main belt was 152 mm thick, and the deck was 79 mm (3.1 in) thick. The conning tower and the casemate guns were also protected by 152 mm of armor plating. The main battery guns had stronger armor protection, at 203 mm thick.

== Service ==
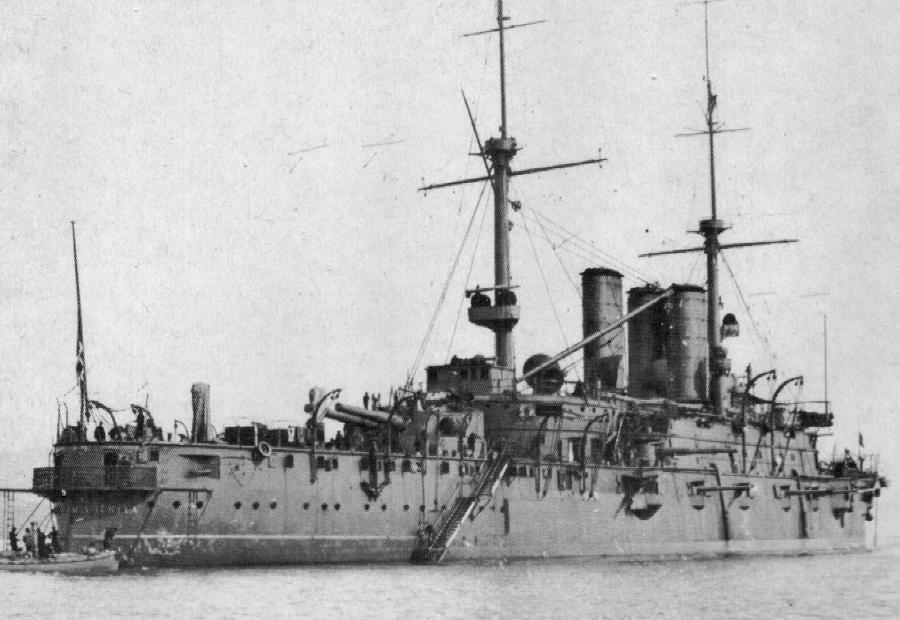
Regina Margherita circa 1908

Regina Margherita laid down at the La Spezia shipyard on 20 November 1898. She was launched on 30 May 1901 in the presence of King Victor Emmanuel, and completed three years later; she was commissioned into the Italian fleet on 14 April 1904. Work progressed slowly on the ship in large part due to non-delivery of material, particularly the heavy armor. In July, the ship conducted her speed trials in the Gulf of Genoa.

Following her completion, she was assigned to the Mediterranean Squadron. The ships in the squadron were typically only on active duty for seven months of the year for training; the rest of the year they were placed in reserve. In 1907, the Mediterranean Squadron consisted of Regina Margherita, her sister Benedetto Brin, and three of the Regina Elena-class battleships. The ships participated in the annual maneuvers in late September and early October as the flagship of Vice Admiral Alfonso di Brocchetti.

=== Italo-Turkish War ===
On 29 September 1911, Italy declared war on the Ottoman Empire in order to seize Libya. During the Italo-Turkish War Regina Mergherita was assigned to the 1st Division of the 2nd Squadron, along with her sister and the two Ammiraglio di Saint Bon-class battleships. She joined the squadron on 5 October, a week after the war started. On 13 April 1912, Regina Margherita and the rest of the Squadron sailed from Tobruk to the Aegean Sea to rendezvous with the 1st Squadron. The two squadrons met off Stampalia on 17 April. The next day, the fleet steamed into the northern Aegean and cut several Turkish submarine cables.

Most of the ships of the Italian fleet then bombarded the fortresses protecting the Dardanelles in an unsuccessful attempt to lure out the Turkish fleet. While they were doing this, Regina Margherita, Benedetto Brin, and two torpedo boats were detached to cut additional cables between Rhodes and Marmaris. On 18 May, Regina Margherita bombarded Marmaris. While debarking troops on the island of Scarpanto in the Aegean, the ship's anchor chain accidentally slipped loose and killed the ship's executive officer, Captain Proli; five other men were injured in the accident. In July, Regina Margherita and the rest of the division had withdrawn to Italy to replace worn-out gun barrels, along with other repairs. In 1912, the ship had four 3-inch guns added, increasing her battery from 20 to 24 pieces.

=== World War I ===
Italy declared neutrality after the outbreak of World War I in August 1914, but by July 1915, the Triple Entente had convinced the Italians to enter the war against the Central Powers. The primary naval opponent for the duration of the war was the Austro-Hungarian Navy; the Naval Chief of Staff, Admiral Paolo Thaon di Revel, planned a distant blockade with the battle fleet, while smaller vessels, such as the MAS boats conducted raids. The heavy ships of the Italian fleet would be preserved for a potential major battle in the Austro-Hungarian fleet should emerge from its bases. By this time, Regina Margherita was long-since obsolescent, and was reduced to a training ship in the 3rd Division, along with her sister ship.

On the night of 11–12 December 1916, while sailing from the port of Valona in heavy sea conditions, she struck two mines laid by the German submarine SM UC-14 and blew up. There were 270 survivors and 675 men perished. The ship's loss was not announced until January 1917. Lieutenant General Oreste Bandini, the commander of the Italian Albania Expeditionary Corps, was on the ship and was among those who were killed in the sinking.
