= Emmanuel Philibert =

Emmanuel Philibert of Savoy (Italian Emanuele Filiberto di Savoia), a name shared by several members of the House of Savoy, may refer to:

- Emmanuel Philibert, Duke of Savoy (1528–1580), a.k.a. "Testa di Ferro" ("Iron head"), sovereign of Savoy from 1553 to 1580
- Emmanuel Philibert of Savoy (1588–1624), Viceroy of Sicily, son of Charles Emmanuel I of Savoy
- Emmanuel Philibert, Prince of Carignano (1628–1709)
- Emmanuel Philibert of Carignano (1662–1676), Count of Dreux, son of Eugene Maurice, Count of Soissons
- Prince Emanuele Filiberto, Duke of Aosta (1731–1735), son of Charles Emmanuel III
- Emanuele Filiberto, Count of Villafranca-Soissons (1888–1933), of the Counts of Villafranca, a minor branch of the House of Savoy
- Prince Emanuele Filiberto, Duke of Aosta (1869–1931), eldest son of Amadeo I of Spain, Italian general of World War I
- Emanuele Filiberto of Savoy, Prince of Venice (born 1972), member of the House of Savoy

== Military ==
Several military units were named after one of the above Savoy princes:

- Italian battleship Emanuele Filiberto (1893–1920)
- 2nd Cavalry Division "Emanuele Filiberto Testa di Ferro" (1930–1943), a military unit of Italy in World War II
- Italian cruiser Emanuele Filiberto Duca d'Aosta (1932–1959)

== See also ==
- Emanuel Philibert de Lalaing (1557–1590), military commander, governor of Hainaut, godson of Emmanuel Philibert, Duke of Savoy and then governor-general of the Low Countries
- Emmanuel-Philibert de Pingon (1525–1582), magistrate and historian of the Duchy of Savoy
- Emanuele Filiberto Manfredi Luserna d'Angrogna, (1557–1616), Italian military leader, of the Androgna family
- Philibert-Emmanuel de Froulay, chevalier de Tessé (1651–1701), French general
