= Benedetto Brin =

Italian politician (1833–1898)

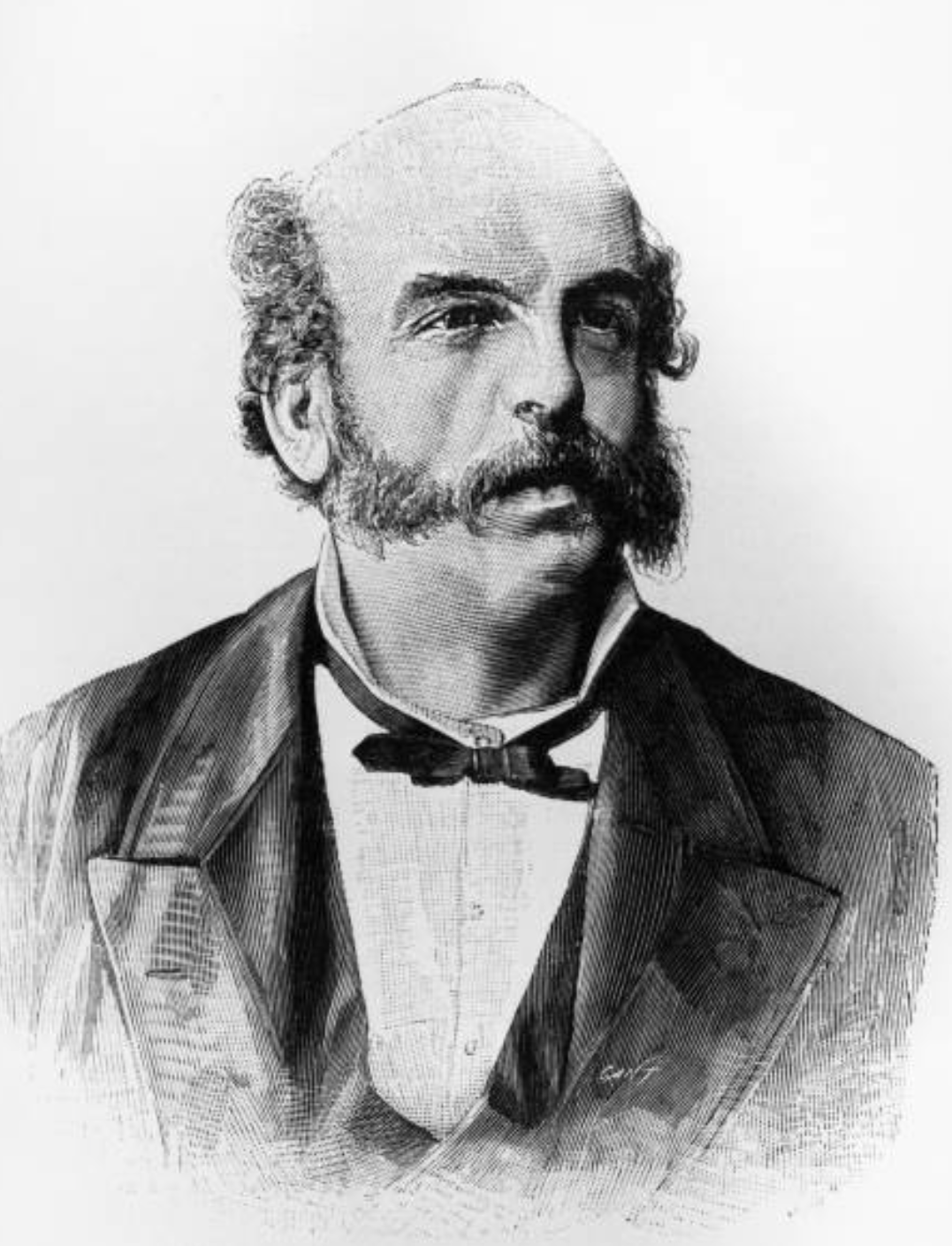
- Benedetto Brin

Minister of Foreign Affairs
- In office 1892–1893
- Monarch: Umberto I
- Preceded by: Antonio Starabba, Marchese di Rudinì
- Succeeded by: Alberto de Blanc

Minister of the Navy
- In office 1876–1898
- Monarchs: Victor Emmanuel II (to 1878); Umberto I (from 1878)

Personal details
- Born: 17 May 1833 Turin, Kingdom of Sardinia
- Died: 24 May 1898 (aged 65)

Benedetto Brin (17 May 1833 in Turin, Piedmont – 24 May 1898 in Rome, Lazio) was an Italian naval administrator and politician. He played a major role in modernizing and expanding the Italian Regia Marina ("Royal Navy") from the 1870s to the 1890s, designing several major classes of warships, including the large ironclad warships of the Duilio, Italia, and Re Umberto classes, the pre-dreadnought battleships of the Ammiraglio di Saint Bon and Regina Margherita classes, and the armored cruisers of the Vettor Pisani and Giuseppe Garibaldi classes. His contributions to Italian naval power were marked by the naming of the second Regina Margherita-class battleship as Benedetto Brin, among other commemorations.

== Biography ==
Born in Turin, he worked with distinction as a naval engineer until the age of forty. In 1873, Admiral Simone Antonio Saint-Bon, Italy's Minister of the Navy, appointed him undersecretary of state. The two men collaborated on major projects: Saint-Bon conceived a type of ship, and Brin made the plans and directed its construction.

On the advent of the Left to power in 1876, Brin was appointed Minister of the Navy by Agostino Depretis, a capacity in which he continued the policies of Saint-Bon, while enlarging and completing the project in such a way as to form the first organic scheme for the development of the Italian fleet. The huge ironclads of the Italia and Duilio classes were his work, though he briefly abandoned their type in favour of smaller and faster armored cruisers of the Vettor Pisani and the Giuseppe Garibaldi classes, before returning to large capital ships with the Re Umberto-class ironclads and later the Regina Margherita class of pre-dreadnought battleships. Through his initiative, the Italian naval industry, almost non-existent in 1873, made rapid progress.

During his eleven years in the ministry (1876–1878 with Depretis, 1884–1891 with Depretis and Francesco Crispi, 1896–1898 with Antonio Starabba, Marchese di Rudinì), he succeeded in creating large private shipyards, engine works and metallurgical works for the production of armour, steel plates and guns.

In 1892, he entered the Giovanni Giolitti cabinet as Minister of Foreign Affairs, accompanying, in that capacity, King Umberto I and Queen Margherita to Potsdam, but chose not to act against France on the occasion of the massacre of Italian workmen at Aigues-Mortes. He died while Minister of the Navy in the Rudini cabinet.

== Commemoration ==
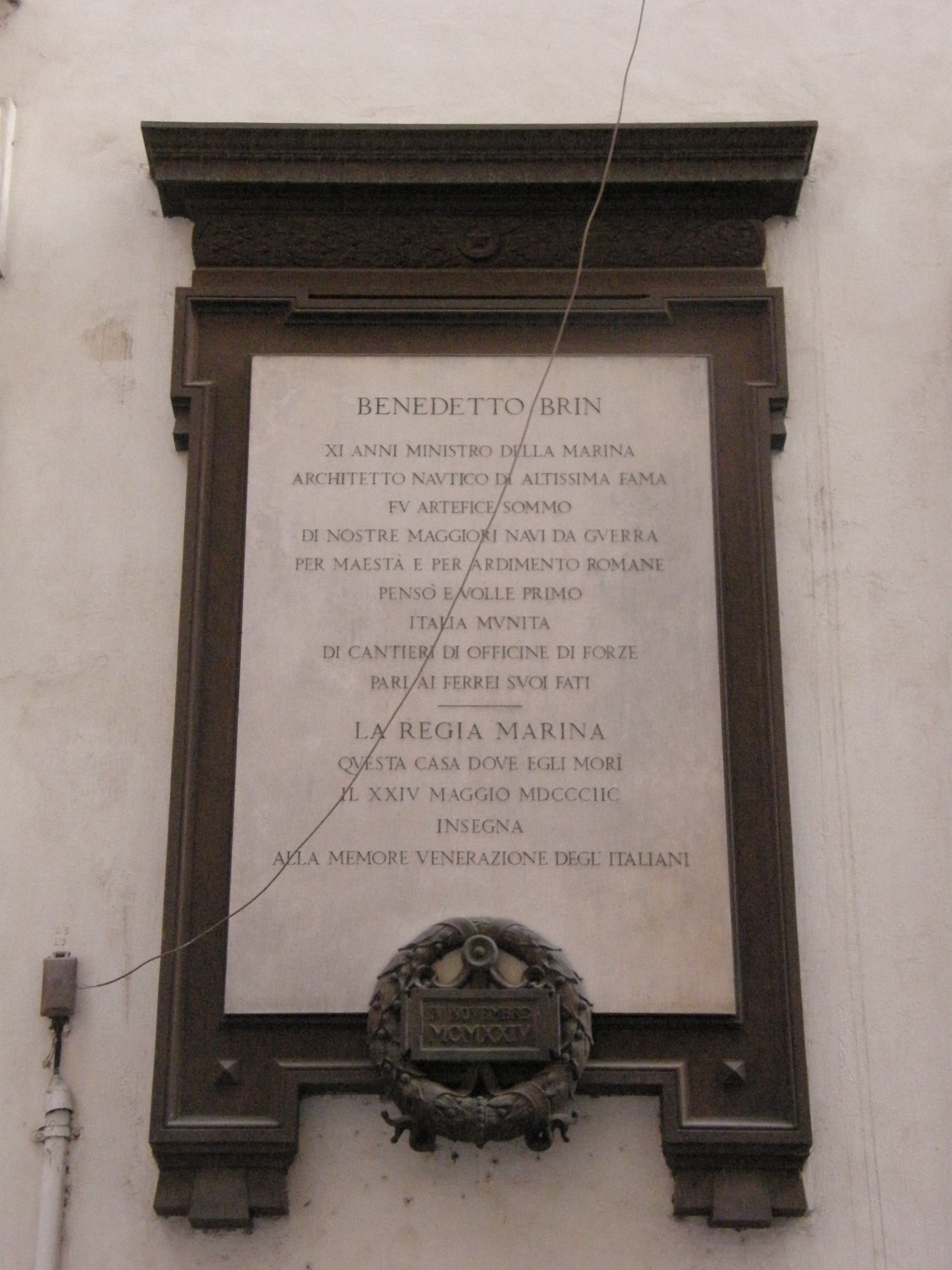
Plaque dedicated to Benedetto Brin on Via Santi Apostoli, Rome.

- The Regia Marina launched the Regina Margherita-class battleship Benedetto Brin, named for him, in 1901.
- The submarine Brin was named after him.
- A commemorative plaque dedicated to Benedetto Brin is on Via Santi Apostoli in Rome.

== Footnotes ==
Preceded by Antonio Starabba, Marchese di Rudinì	Italian Minister of Foreign Affairs; 1892–1893	Succeeded by Alberto de Blanc
