= Italian ironclad Sardegna =

Ironclad warship of the Italian Royal Navy

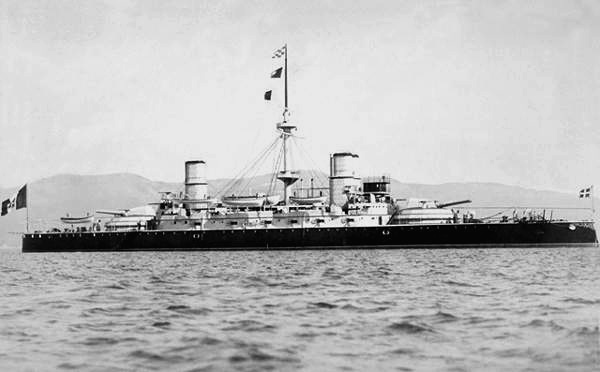
- Sardegna

History

Italy
- Name: Sardegna
- Namesake: Sardinia
- Builder: Arsenale di La Spezia
- Laid down: 24 October 1884
- Launched: 20 September 1890
- Completed: 16 February 1895
- Stricken: 4 January 1923

General characteristics
- Class & type: Re Umberto-class ironclad
- Displacement: Normal: 13,641 long tons (13,860 t); Full load: 15,426 long tons (15,674 t)
- Length: 130.7 m (428 ft 10.5 in)
- Beam: 23.4 m (76 ft 10.5 in)
- Draft: 8.8 m (29 ft)
- Installed power: 22,800 ihp (17,002 kW); 18 × fire-tube boilers
- Propulsion: 2 × compound steam engines; 2 × screw propellers
- Speed: 20.3 knots (37.6 km/h; 23.4 mph)
- Range: 4,000–6,000 nmi (7,408–11,112 km) at 10 knots (19 km/h; 12 mph)
- Complement: 794
- Armament: 4 × 343 mm (13.5 in) guns; 8 × 152 mm (6 in) guns; 16 × 120 mm (4.7 in) guns; 20 × 57 mm (2.24 in) six-pounder guns; 10 × 37 mm (1.5 in) guns; 5 × 450 mm (17.7 in) torpedo tubes
- Armor: Belt and side: 102 mm (4 in); Deck: 76.2 mm (3 in); Barbettes: 349 mm (13.75 in); Conning tower: 302 mm (11.88 in)

Sardegna was the third of three Re Umberto-class ironclad battleships built for the Italian Regia Marina (Royal Navy). The ship, named for the island of Sardinia, was laid down in La Spezia in October 1885, launched in September 1890, and completed in February 1895. She was armed with a main battery of four 340 mm (13.5 in) guns and had a top speed of 20.3 knots (37.6 km/h; 23.4 mph)—albeit at the cost of armor protection—and she was one of the first warships to be equipped with a wireless telegraph.

Sardegna spent the first decade of her career in the Active Squadron of the Italian fleet. Thereafter, she was transferred to the Reserve Squadron, and by 1911, she was part of the Training Division. She took part in the Italo-Turkish War of 1911–1912, where she escorted convoys to North Africa and supported Italian forces ashore by bombarding Ottoman troops. During World War I, Sardegna served as the flagship of the naval forces defending Venice against a possible attack from the Austro-Hungarian Navy, which did not materialize. After the city became threatened following the Battle of Caporetto in November 1917, the ship was withdrawn to Brindisi and later Taranto, where she continued to serve as a guard ship. She took part in Allied operations in Turkey in 1919–1922, and after returning to Italy in 1923, she was broken up for scrap.

== Design ==
The Italian Regia Marina embarked on a major construction program in the mid-1870s that included ten modern ironclad battleships, which gave Italy the third largest battle fleet in the world, behind only Great Britain and France. The previous designs—the Duilio, Italia, and Ruggiero di Lauriaes—carried their main battery in an en echelon arrangement, while the new Re Umberto class adopted a fore-and-aft arrangement that maximized firing arcs.

=== Characteristics ===
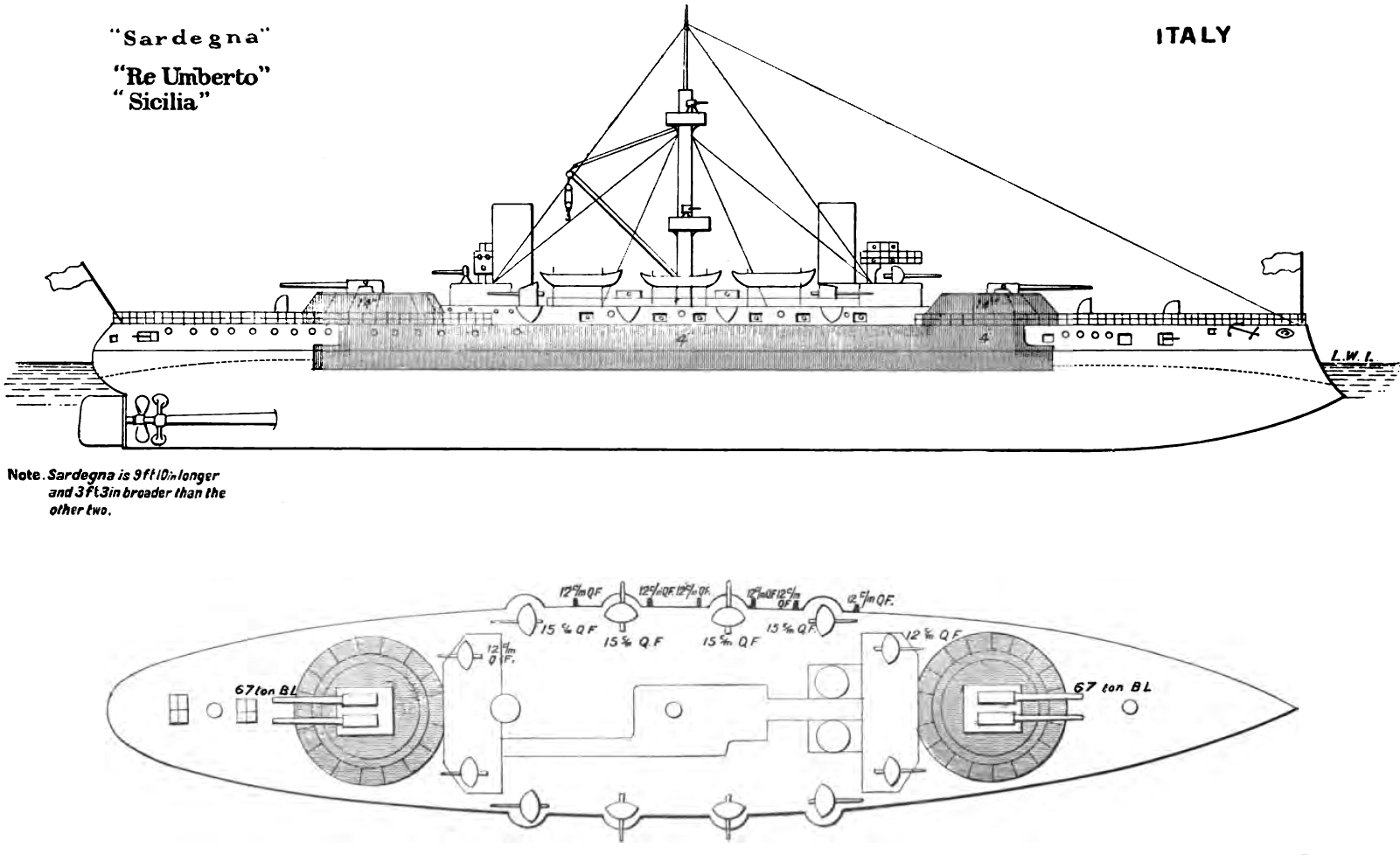
Line-drawing of the Re Umberto class

Sardegna was 130.73 meters (428.9 ft) long overall; she had a beam of 23.44 m (76.9 ft) and an average draft of 8.84 m (29.0 ft). She displaced 13,641 long tons (13,860 t) normally and up to 15,426 long tons (15,674 t) at full load. The ship had an inverted bow with a ram below the waterline. She was fitted with a single military mast located amidships, which had fighting tops for some of the light guns. The ship's superstructure included a conning tower forward and a secondary conning tower further aft. She had a crew of 794 officers and men. Sardegna was one of the first warships equipped with Guglielmo Marconi's new wireless telegraph.

Her propulsion system consisted of a pair of triple-expansion steam engines, each driving a single screw propeller, with steam supplied by eighteen coal-fired, cylindrical fire-tube boilers. The boilers were vented through three funnels, two placed side by side just aft of the conning tower and the third much further aft. She was the first Italian warship to be equipped with triple expansion engines. Her propulsion system produced a top speed of 20.3 knots (37.6 km/h; 23.4 mph) at 22,800 indicated horsepower (17,000 kW). Specific figures for her cruising radius have not survived, but the ships of her class could steam for 4,000 to 6,000 nautical miles (7,400 to 11,100 km; 4,600 to 6,900 mi) at a speed of 10 knots (19 km/h; 12 mph).

Sardegna was armed with a main battery of four 343 mm (13.5 in) 30-caliber guns, mounted in two twin-gun turrets, one on either end of the ship. She carried a secondary battery of eight 152 mm (6 in) 40-cal. guns placed singly in shielded mounts atop the upper deck, with four on each broadside. Close-range defense against torpedo boats was provided by a battery of sixteen 120 mm (4.7 in) guns in casemates in the upper deck, eight on each broadside. These were supported by twenty 57 mm (2.24 in) 43-cal. guns and ten 37 mm (1.5 in) guns. As was customary for capital ships of the period, she carried five 450 mm (17.7 in) torpedo tubes in above-water launchers.

The ship was lightly armored for her size. She was protected by belt armor that was 102 mm (4 in) thick; the belt was fairly narrow and only covered the central portion of the hull, from the forward to the aft main battery gun. She had an armored deck that was 76 mm (3 in) thick, and her conning tower was armored with 300 mm (11.8 in) of steel plate. The turrets had 102 mm thick faces and the supporting barbettes had 349 mm (13.75 in) thick steel.

== Service history ==
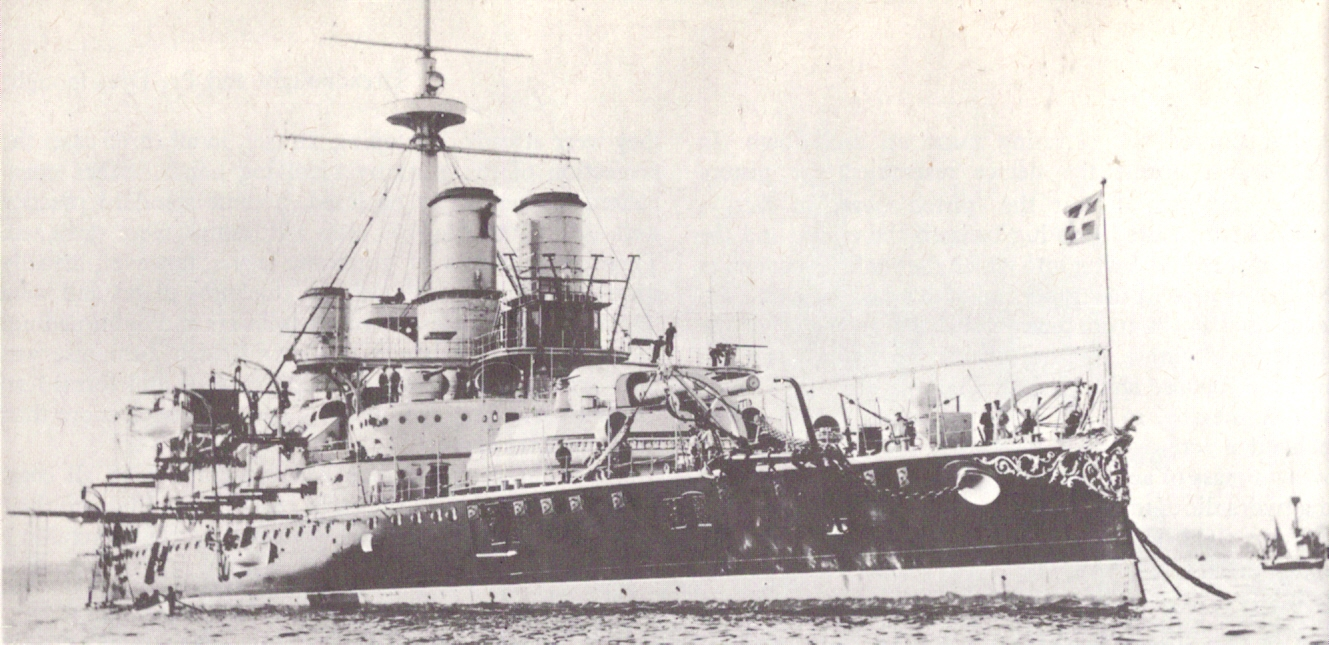
Sardegna at anchor

Sardegna was named after the island of Sardinia. She was built by the Arsenale di La Spezia in La Spezia, with her keel being laid down on 24 October 1885. She was launched on 20 September 1890, and completed on 16 February 1895. After entering service, Sardegna was assigned to the 2nd Division of the Reserve Squadron as its flagship, along with the older ironclad Ruggiero di Lauria and the torpedo cruiser Aretusa. At the time, the ships of the Reserve Squadron were based in La Spezia. Sardegna joined the ironclads Re Umberto, Ruggiero di Lauria, and Andrea Doria and the cruisers Stromboli, Etruria, and Partenope for a visit to Spithead in the United Kingdom in July 1895. Later that year, the squadron stopped in Germany for the celebration held to mark the opening of the Kaiser Wilhelm Canal. While there, Sardegna accidentally ran aground in front of the canal, blocking the entrance for several days.

In February 1896, Sardegna moved to the Active Squadron, along with Andrea Doria and the ironclad Francesco Morosini; by 1 April, it also included a pair of cruisers and three torpedo cruisers. At that time, the Italian fleet rotated ships between the Active and Reserve squadrons every February. Sardegna took part in the annual fleet maneuvers held in August and September that year, which saw the ship assigned to the squadron tasked with defending against a simulated French attack on the Italian coast. By 1899, Sardegna had been assigned to the Active Squadron, which at that time was kept in active service for eight months of the year. It included five other battleships and several cruisers.

For 1903, the Active Squadron was on active service for seven months, with the rest of the year spent with reduced crews. In 1904–1905, Sardegna and her sisters were in service with the Active Squadron, which was kept in service for nine months of the year, with three months in reduced commission. The following year, the ships were transferred to the Reserve Squadron, along with the three Ruggiero di Lauria-class ironclads and the ironclad Enrico Dandolo, three cruisers, and sixteen torpedo boats. This squadron only entered active service for two months of the year for training maneuvers, and the rest of the year was spent with reduced crews. Sardegna was still in the Reserve Squadron in 1908, along with her two sisters and the two Ammiraglio di Saint Bon-class battleships. By this time, the Reserve Squadron was kept in service for seven months of the year.

=== Italo-Turkish War ===
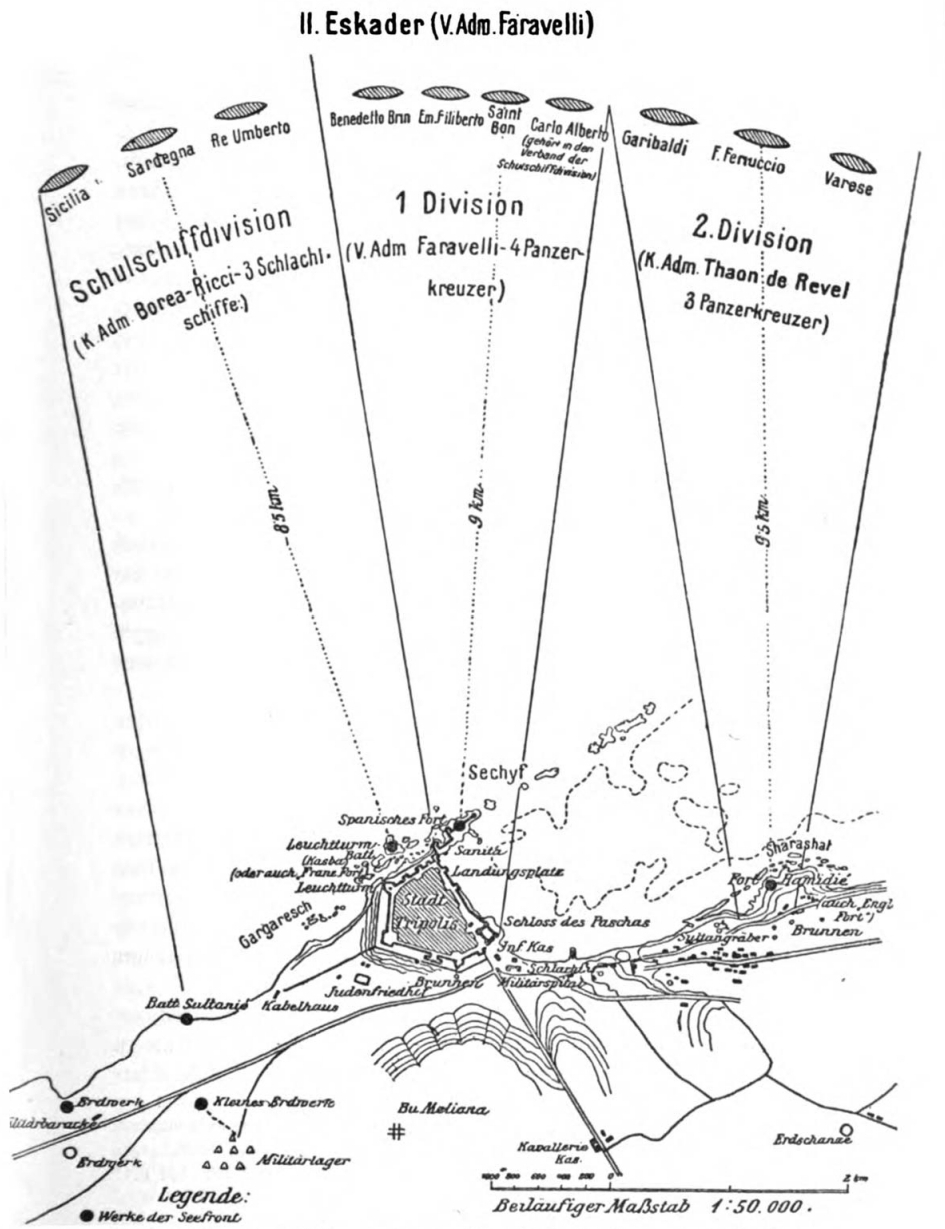
Map showing the bombardment of Tripoli

On 29 September 1911, Italy declared war on the Ottoman Empire in order to seize Libya. At the time, Sardegna and her two sisters were assigned to the Training Division, along with the old armored cruiser Carlo Alberto, under the command of Rear Admiral Raffaele Borea Ricci D'Olmo. On 3–4 October, Sardegna and her sisters were tasked with bombarding Fort Sultanje, which was protecting the western approach to Tripoli. The ships used their 6-inch guns to attack the fort to preserve their stock of 13.5-inch shells. By the morning of the 4th, the ships' gunfire had silenced the guns in the fort, allowing landing forces to go ashore and capture the city. The ships of the Training Division thereafter alternated between Tripoli and Khoms to support the Italian garrisons in the two cities; this included repulsing a major Ottoman attack on Tripoli over 23–26 October, where Sardegna and Sicilia supported the Italian left flank against concerted Ottoman assaults. During this engagement, Sardegna used a spotter aircraft to help direct the fire of her guns, the first time aircraft had been used in that role. By December, the three ships were stationed in Tripoli, where they were replaced by the old ironclads Italia and Lepanto. Sardenga and her sisters arrived back in La Spezia, where they had their ammunition and supplies replenished.

By December, the three ships were stationed in Tripoli, where they were replaced by the old ironclads Italia and Lepanto. Sardegna and her sisters arrived back in La Spezia, where they had their ammunition and supplies replenished. In May 1912, the Training Division patrolled the coast, but saw no action. The following month, Sardegna and her sisters, along with six torpedo boats, escorted a convoy carrying an infantry brigade to Buscheifa, one of the last ports in Libya still under Ottoman control. The Italian force arrived off the town on 14 June and made a landing; after taking the city, the Italian forces then moved on to Misrata. Sardegna and the rest of the ships continued supporting the advance until the Italians had secured the city on 20 July.The Training Division then returned to Italy, where they joined the escort for another convoy on 3 August, this time to Zuara, the last port in Ottoman hands. The ships covered the landing two miles east of Zuara two days later, which was joined by supporting attacks from the west and south. With the capture of the city, Italy now controlled the entire Libyan coast. On 14 October the Ottomans agreed to sign a peace treaty to end the war.

=== Later career ===
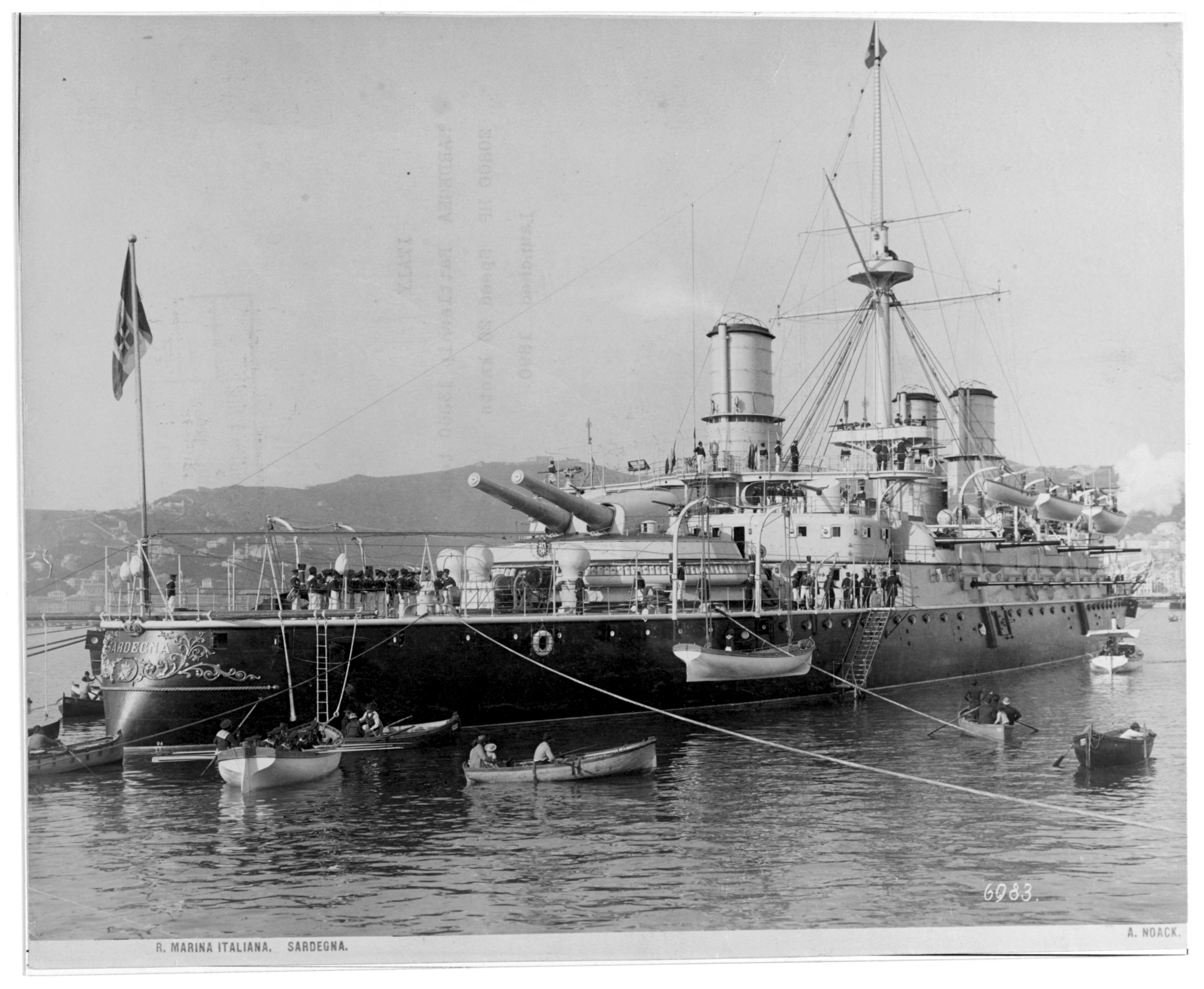
Sardegna around 1895

Italy had declared neutrality at the start of World War I, but by July 1915, the Triple Entente had convinced the Italians to enter the war against the Central Powers. Admiral Paolo Thaon di Revel, the Italian naval chief of staff, believed that the threat from Austro-Hungarian submarines and naval mines in the narrow waters of the Adriatic was too serious for him to use the fleet in an active way. Instead, Revel decided to implement a blockade at the relatively safer southern end of the Adriatic with the main fleet, while smaller vessels, such as the MAS boats, conducted raids on Austro-Hungarian ships and installations. For their part, the Austro-Hungarians adopted a similar strategy, as they too were unwilling to risk the heavy units of their fleet. She was the flagship for the Northern Adriatic Naval Forces after Italy entered the war. The Northern Adriatic Naval Forces also included the two old Ammiraglio di Saint Bon-class battleships, two cruisers, and several smaller craft. The ships were tasked with defending Venice from Austro-Hungarian attacks; this service lasted until 15 November 1917. Since neither the Italians or Austro-Hungarians were willing to risk the main units of their fleets, Sardegna had an uneventful career during the war.

The ship was thereafter transferred to Brindisi for use as a harbor defense ship. The reason for her withdrawal was the major Italian defeat at the Battle of Caporetto; the German and Austro-Hungarian advance threatened to continue to Venice. Here, all of her secondary and light guns were removed, leaving her with only her main battery guns. She was equipped with a small battery of anti-aircraft guns, consisting of four 3 in (76 mm) /40 guns and two machine guns. On 10 June 1918, Sardegna was moved to Taranto, where she continued serving as a guard ship. She took part in Allied operations in Constantinople after the end of the war, from 7 November 1919 to 5 April 1922. The ship did not remain in service long after returning to Italy. She was stricken on 4 January 1923 and subsequently broken up for scrap.
