= Ammiraglio di Saint Bon-class battleship =

Pre-dreadnought battleship class of the Italian Royal Navy

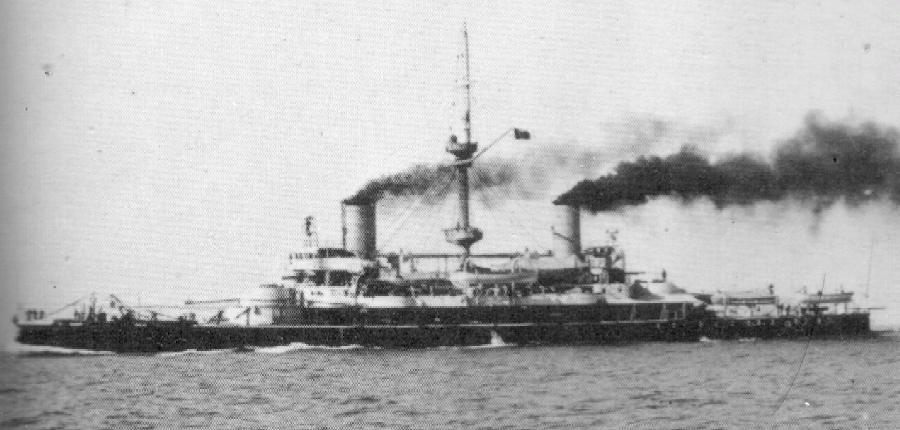
- Ammiraglio di Saint Bon

Class overview
- Name: Ammiraglio di Saint Bon class
- Builders: Arsenal di Venezia; R C di Castellammare di Stabia
- Operators: Regia Marina
- Preceded by: Re Umberto class
- Succeeded by: Regina Margherita class
- Built: 1893–1902
- In service: 1901–1920
- Completed: 2
- Retired: 2

General characteristics
- Type: Pre-dreadnought battleship
- Displacement: Normal: 10,082 long tons (10,244 t); Full load: 10,531 long tons (10,700 t)
- Length: 111.8 m (366 ft 10 in)
- Beam: 21.12 m (69 ft 3 in)
- Draft: 7.69 m (25 ft 3 in)
- Installed power: 12 × fire-tube boilers; 14,296 ihp (10,661 kW)
- Propulsion: 2 × triple-expansion steam engines; 2 × screw propellers
- Speed: 18.3 knots (33.9 km/h; 21.1 mph)
- Range: 5,500 nmi (10,200 km; 6,300 mi) at 10 knots (19 km/h; 12 mph)
- Complement: 557
- Armament: 4 × 254 mm (10 in) guns; 8 × 152 mm (6 in) guns; 8 × 120 mm (4.7 in) guns; 8 × 57 mm (2.24 in) six-pounder guns; 2 × 37 mm (1.5 in) guns; 4 × 450 mm (17.7 in) torpedo tubes
- Armor: Belt and side: 249 mm (9.8 in); Deck: 70 mm (2.75 in); Turrets: 249 mm (9.8 in); Conning tower: 249 mm (9.8 in); Casemates: 150 mm (5.9 in)

The Ammiraglio di Saint Bon class was a pair of pre-dreadnought battleships built for the Italian Regia Marina (Royal Navy) during the 1890s. The class comprised two ships: Ammiraglio di Saint Bon, the lead ship, and Emanuele Filiberto. They were armed with a main battery of four 254 mm (10 in) guns and were capable of a top speed of 18 knots (33 km/h; 21 mph). Smaller and less powerfully-armed than most contemporary battleships, they marked a brief departure from Italian capital ship design, which had previously emphasized large ships equipped with large guns.

Both ships served in the active duty squadron early in their careers, and participated in the Italo-Turkish War of 1911–1912. They took part in the Italian offensives in North Africa and the island of Rhodes, but did not see combat with the Ottoman fleet. They were reduced to harbor defense ships by the outbreak of World War I, and they spent the war in Venice. The ships were discarded shortly after the end of the war, both having been stricken in 1920.

== Design ==
The previous Italian capital ships, the Re Umberto and the Ruggiero di Lauria classes of ironclad battleships, marked a period of experimentation on the part of Benedetto Brin, Admiral Simone di Pacoret Saint Bon, and the strategists of the Italian navy. Since the planners had not determined what type of battleship would best suit their strategic needs, the government stepped in and mandated a 10,000-long-ton (10,160 t) design, a limit significantly lower than the earlier classes. Following the death of di Saint Bon, Brin took over the design process and proposed a small battleship armed with 10 in (254 mm) guns, a weaker main battery than those of contemporary foreign designs.

The ships, much smaller than their contemporaries, and slower than cruisers, were not particularly useful warships. The mistake of building a battleship of only 10,000 tons was not repeated in the subsequent, and much more successful, Regina Margherita class.

=== General characteristics and machinery ===
Plan and profile drawing of the Ammiraglio di Saint Bon class

The ships of the Ammiraglio di Saint Bon class were 105 meters (344 ft 6 in) long at the waterline and 111.8 m (366 ft 10 in) long overall. They had a beam of 21.12 m (69 ft 3 in) and a maximum draft of 7.69 m (25 ft 3 in). Ammiraglio di Saint Bon displaced 10,082 long tons (10,244 t) at normal loading and 10,531 long tons (10,700 t) at full load, while Emanuele Filiberto displaced 9,645 long tons (9,800 t) and 9,940 long tons (10,100 t), respectively.

The ships had an inverted bow and a relatively low freeboard of only 3 m (9.8 ft). They had a fairly large superstructure with a conning tower and high bridge forward and a large military mast fitted with fighting tops placed amidships. Abreast the mast, each ship carried a number of small boats. Ammiraglio di Saint Bon had a crew of 557 officers and enlisted men, while Emanuele Filiberto had a slightly larger complement of 565.

The ships' propulsion system consisted of two triple-expansion steam engines, which drove a pair of screw propellers. Steam for the engines was provided by twelve coal-fired cylindrical fire-tube boilers, which were ducted into a pair of widely spaced funnels. Ammiraglio di Saint Bon's were rated at 14,296 indicated horsepower (10,661 kW), while Emanuele Filiberto's engines only reached 13,552 ihp (10,106 kW). The ships' propulsion system provided a top speed of 18 knots (33 km/h; 21 mph) and a range of approximately 3,400 to 5,500 nautical miles (6,300 to 10,200 km; 3,900 to 6,300 mi) at 10 knots (19 km/h; 12 mph).

=== Armament and armor ===
The ships were armed with a main battery of four 254 mm (10 in) 40-caliber guns manufactured by Armstrong Whitworth. The guns were placed in two twin gun turrets, one forward and one aft. The ships were also equipped with a secondary battery of eight 152 mm (6 in) 40-cal. guns in individual casemates amidships. These guns were export derivatives of the British QF 6-inch /40 gun. Ammiraglio di Saint Bon was also equipped with eight 120 mm (4.7 in) 40-cal. guns in shielded pivot mounts directly above the casemate battery, while Ammiraglio di Saint Bon carried six 76 mm (3 in) guns. Close-range defense against torpedo boats was provided by a battery of eight 57 mm (2.24 in) guns and two 37 mm (1.5 in) guns. Emanuele Filiberto had eight 47 mm (1.9 in) guns instead. Both ships also carried four 450 mm (17.7 in) torpedo tubes in deck-mounted launchers.

The ships were protected with Harvey steel. The main belt was 249 mm (9.8 in) thick, and the deck was 70 mm (2.75 in) thick. The conning tower was protected by 249 mm of armor plating on the sides. The main battery guns also had 249 mm thick plating on the turrets, and the casemates were 150 mm (5.9 in) thick.

== Ships of the class ==
Construction data
Name	Builder	Laid down	Launched	Completed
Ammiraglio di Saint Bon	Venetian Arsenal	18 July 1893	29 April 1897	24 May 1901
Emanuele Filiberto	Regio Cantiere di Castellammare di Stabia	5 October 1893	29 September 1897	16 April 1902

== Service ==
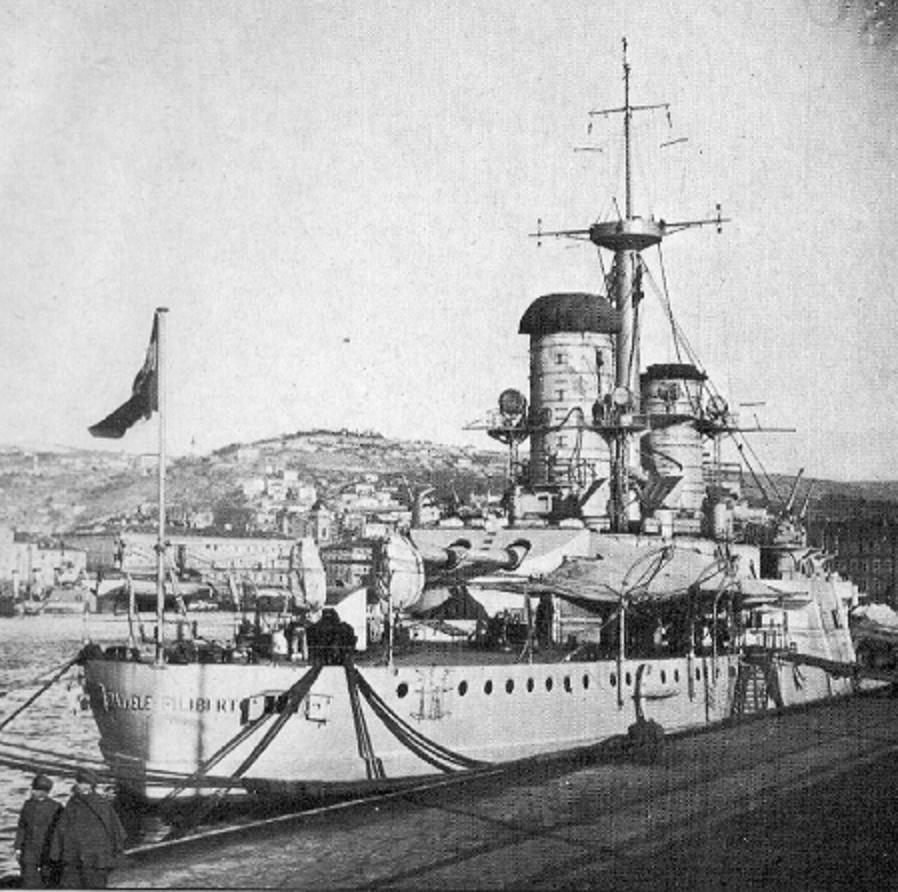
Emanuele Filiberto at Fiume in late 1918 after the end of World War I

Ammiraglio di Saint Bon was built by the Venetian Arsenal in Venice. She was laid down on 18 July 1893, launched on 29 April 1897, and completed on 24 May 1901, although she had been commissioned on 1 February 1901. Emanuele Filiberto was named after Prince Emanuele Filiberto, Duke of Aosta. She was built by the Regio Cantiere di Castellammare di Stabia (Royal Shipyard of Castellammare di Stabia), Naples. She was laid down on 5 October 1893, launched on 29 September 1897, and completed on 16 April 1902, although she had been commissioned on 6 September 1901. The ships spend the first several years in the active duty squadron until they were replaced by the new Regina Elena-class battleships, which entered service by 1908.

Both ships took part in the Italo-Turkish War in 1911–1912 in the 3rd Division with the two Regina Margherita-class battleships. Emanuele Filiberto took part in the attack on Tripoli in October 1911, though Ammiraglio di Saint Bon did not see action in the first months of the war. Both ships participated in the seizure of the island of Rhodes, where Ammiraglio di Saint Bon provided gunfire support to the soldiers ashore.

The two ships were slated to be scrapped in 1914–1915 due to their age, but the outbreak of World War I in August 1914 prevented their disposal. Italy initially remained neutral during the war, but by 1915, had been convinced by the Triple Entente to enter the war against Germany and Austria-Hungary. Both Ammiraglio di Saint Bon and Emanuele Filiberto were used as harbor defense ships in Venice for the duration of the war, and did not see action there. Neither ship remained in service long after the end of the war. Emanuele Filiberto was stricken from the naval register on 29 March 1920 and Ammiraglio di Saint Bon was stricken on 18 June. Both ships were subsequently discarded.
