= Filiberto Hernández Martínez =

Mexican serial killer

- Born: 1971 (age 54–55); Ebano, San Luis Potosi, Mexico
- Other names: "The Tamuin Monster", "the Beast Tamuin" or "the Tamuin Strangler"
- Penalty: Life imprisonment

Details
- Victims: 6
- Span of crimes: 2010–2014
- Country: Mexico
- State: San Luis Potosi
- Date apprehended: July 5, 2014

Filiberto Hernández Martínez (born 1971) was a Mexican serial killer active between 2010 and 2013. His crimes took place in Tamuín, in the south of San Luis Potosí, where he allegedly murdered four children and a woman, before another femicide was attributed to him.

== Biography ==
In 1971, Filiberto Hernández was born alongside 3 brothers and 2 sisters in Ebano, San Luis Potosí, to an impoverished family. According to his father, Marcelino Hernández, he was a normal boy, had worked from a young age, only studied to a high school level, and enlisted in the military when he was 17 years old.

== See also ==
- List of serial killers by country
