= Filiberto Petiti =

Italian painter

Filiberto Petiti or Pettiti (1845–1924) was an Italian painter, active in Rome, painting landscapes.

== Biography ==
He was born in Turin. He was inspired by Carlo Piacenza and frequented the Accademia Albertina. Among his works are La pesca nello stagno, Nella Maremma, La Spiaggia di Fiumicino, Nella Macchia di San Marino, Cavalli al beveraggio, Il Colosseo, All'aperto, Lavandaie, Libecci, and Scene d'inverno.
