= Filiberto Penados =

Belizean scholar and community activist

Filiberto Penados (born 1971) is a Belizean education and indigenous studies scholar and community activist. He has held faculty positions at the University of Belize and the University of Toronto and now serves at the Engaged Scholarship Director and Indigenous Studies Professor for the Center for Engaged Learning Abroad – Belize (CELA-Belize).

Penados was born in San Jose Succotz, a village in Cayo District, Belize. He attended University College of Belize, graduating in 1993 with a BS in Math Education before obtaining his PhD in Education from the University of Otago in New Zealand in 1999. Penados has taught and worked on indigenous issues since his return to Belize. He serves as Chairman of the Advisory Council to the Julian Cho Society, a Maya rights group, and has held positions with UNICEF-Belize, the Central American Indigenous Council, and the Tumul K’in Center of Learning.
