= Androgna =

Androgna or Angrogna is a surname of Italian nobility. The name may refer to:

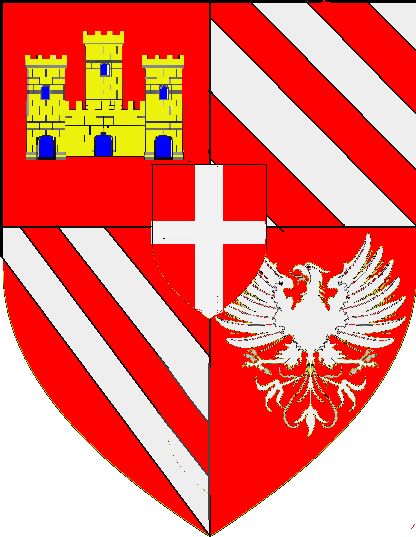
Coat of arms of the House of Luserna d'Angrogna, cadet branch, c.1700.

- Carlo Manfredi Luserna d'Angrogna (1508/10–1572), signore d'Angrogna, count of Luserna, and Governor of Vercelli
- Emanuele Filiberto Manfredi Luserna d'Angrogna (c.1557 – 1616), military commander
- Caterina Manfredi (1590–1598), Contessa di Luserna dei Marchesi d'Angrogna
- Alessandro Manfredi Luserna d'Angrogna (1800–1867), Italian general and nobleman
- Anna d'Androgna Pallavicini (1840–1922), Marchesa and patron of the arts
- Emilio d'Androgna Pallavicini (1823–1901), general and senator who defeated Garibaldi at the battle of Aspromonte
- Marquis of Androgna, a title of Italian nobility

== See also ==
- Manfredi family
- Pallavicini family
- List of Italian Marquisates
