= Filiberto Rodríguez Motamayor =

Venezuelan writer, lawyer, and poet

Filiberto Rodríguez Motamayor (22 August 1867, Calabozo – 14 December 1915, Maiquetía) was a Venezuelan writer, lawyer, and poet.
