= Re Umberto-class ironclad =

Ironclad warship class of the Italian Royal Navy

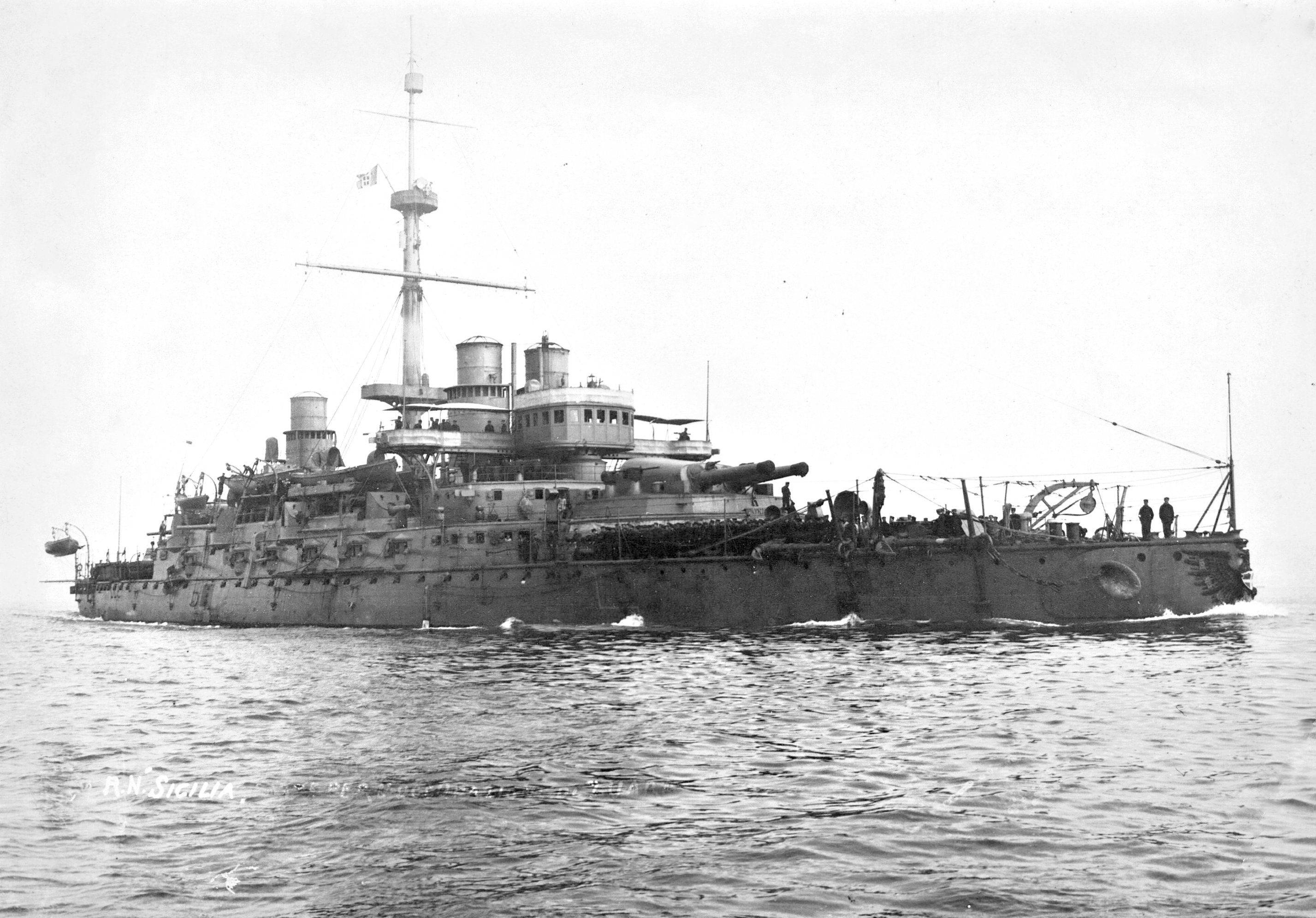
- Sicilia

Class overview
- Name: Re Umberto
- Builders: Regio Cantiere di Castellammare di Stabia
- Operators: Regia Marina
- Preceded by: Ruggiero di Lauria class
- Succeeded by: Ammiraglio di Saint Bon class
- Built: 1884–1895
- In commission: 1893–1918
- Completed: 3
- Scrapped: 3

General characteristics
- Type: Ironclad battleship
- Displacement: Normal: 13,673 long tons (13,892 t); Full load: 15,454 long tons (15,702 t)
- Length: 418 ft 7.5 in (127.6 m)
- Beam: 76 ft 10.5 in (23.4 m)
- Draft: 30 ft 6 in (9.3 m)
- Installed power: 19,500 ihp (14,541 kW); 18 × fire-tube boilers
- Propulsion: 2 × compound steam engines; 2 × screw propellers
- Speed: 18.5 knots (34.3 km/h; 21.3 mph)
- Range: 4,000–6,000 nmi (7,408–11,112 km)
- Complement: 733
- Armament: 4 × 343 mm (13.5 in) guns; 8 × 152 mm (6 in) guns; 16 × 120 mm (4.7 in) guns; 16 × 57 mm (2.24 in) six-pounder guns; 10 × 37 mm (1.5 in) guns; 5 × 450 mm (17.7 in) torpedo tubes
- Armor: Belt and side: 102 mm (4 in); Deck: 76.2 mm (3 in); Barbettes: 349 mm (13.75 in); Turrets: 102 mm (4 in); Conning tower: 300 mm (11.8 in); Casemates: 51 mm (2 in)

The Re Umberto class were a group of three ironclad battleships built for the Italian Navy in the 1880s and 1890s. The ships—Re Umberto, Sicilia, and Sardegna—were built as the culmination of a major naval expansion program begun in the 1870s following Italy's defeat at the Battle of Lissa in 1866. The Re Umbertos incorporated several innovations over previous Italian designs, including a more efficient arrangement of the main battery, installation of wireless telegraphs, and in Sardegna, the first use of triple-expansion steam engines in an Italian capital ship. Designed by Benedetto Brin, they retained the very thin armor protection and high top speeds of his earlier designs.

All three ships served in the Active Squadron for the first decade of their careers, which proved to be uneventful. They were transferred to the Reserve Squadron in 1905, and by the outbreak of the Italo-Turkish War in 1911, they were serving as training ships. They provided fire support to Italian troops fighting in Libya during the conflict and took part in the seizure of several Ottoman ports, including Tripoli. During World War I, Sardegna was used as a guard ship in Venice, while Re Umberto served as a floating battery in Brindisi and Sicilia was reduced to a depot ship. All three ships survived the war and were broken up for scrap in the early 1920s.

== Design ==
Starting in the 1870s, following the Italian fleet's defeat at the Battle of Lissa, the Italians began a large naval expansion program, aimed at countering the Austro-Hungarian Navy. The Re Umberto class was the culmination of the first phase of the program, which saw ten modern ironclad battleships built; these ships placed Italy with the third largest navy in the world, after Great Britain and France. The three Re Umbertos were designed by Benedetto Brin, then the president of the Committee for Naval Projects, and who had overseen most of the ironclad construction program. The first two ships were authorized in 1883, and in 1885 Brin, who was then the naval minister, proposed a third vessel.

=== General characteristics and machinery ===
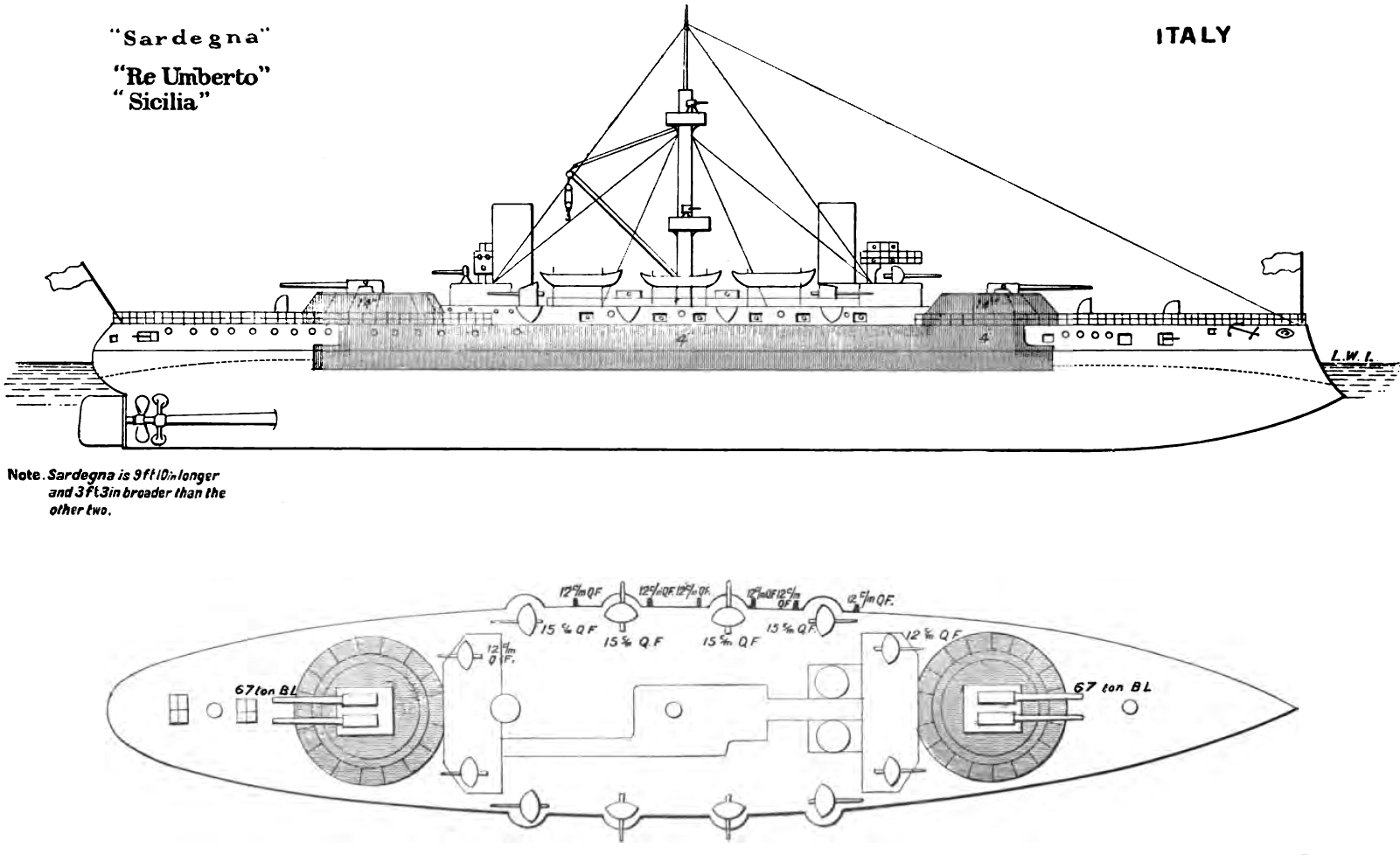
Right elevation and deck plan from Brassey's Naval Annual; shaded areas show the extent of the armor layout

The three ships of the class differed slightly in their dimensions; Re Umberto and Sicilia were the same length and width but Sardegna was longer. The ships had an overall length of 127.6 to 130.73 meters (418 ft 8 in to 428 ft 11 in); all three had a beam of 23.44 m (76 ft 11 in). The three ships displaced between 13,058 to 13,673 long tons (13,268 to 13,892 t) normally and 14,842 to 15,454 long tons (15,080 to 15,702 t) at full load, with Sicilia the lightest and Re Umberto the heaviest. The first two ships had a draft of 9.29 m (30 ft 6 in), while Sardegna's longer hull gave her a reduced draft, at 8.84 m (29 ft). The ships were fitted with a single military mast with two fighting tops amidships. Sardegna was one of the first warships equipped with Marconi's new wireless telegraph. The ships' crews also varied in size, from 733 officers and men aboard Re Umberto, to 736 for Sicilia and 794 on Sardegna.

The propulsion system for Re Umberto and Sicilia consisted of a pair of horizontal compound steam engines each driving a single screw propeller, with steam supplied by eighteen coal-fired, cylindrical fire-tube boilers. These ships' engines were manufactured by Gio. Ansaldo & C., based on a design from Maudslay, Sons and Field. Sardegna instead received a pair of triple-expansion steam engines, with the same number and type of boilers; she was the first Italian warship to be equipped with triple expansion engines. The ships' boilers were trunked into three funnels, with two side-by-side just aft of the conning tower, and the third further aft. Re Umberto's engines produced a top speed of 18.5 knots (34.3 km/h; 21.3 mph) at 19,500 indicated horsepower (14,500 kW), while Sicilia made 20.1 knots (37.2 km/h; 23.1 mph) from 19,131 ihp (14,266 kW) and Sardegna reached 20.3 knots (37.6 km/h; 23.4 mph) from 22,800 ihp (17,000 kW). Specific figures for each ship's cruising radius have not survived, but the ships of her class could steam for 4,000 to 6,000 nautical miles (7,400 to 11,100 km; 4,600 to 6,900 mi) at a speed of 10 knots (19 km/h; 12 mph).

=== Armament and armor ===
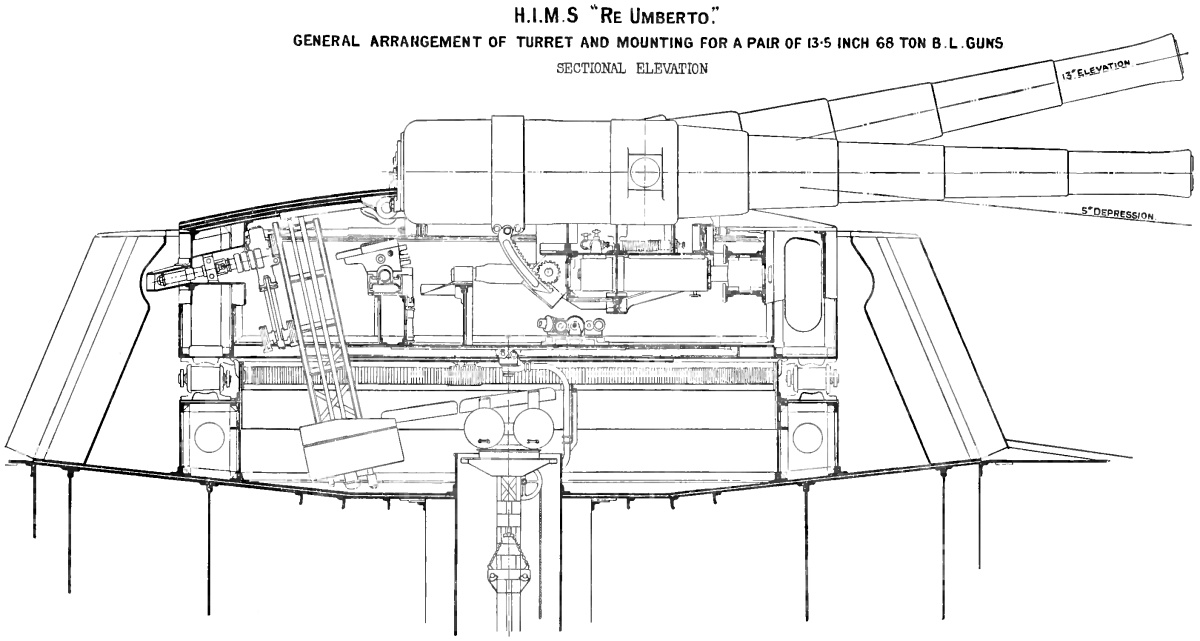
Barbette with 13.5-inch gun

The ships of the Re Umberto class were armed with a main battery of four 343 mm (13.5 in) 30-caliber guns, mounted in two twin-gun turrets, one on either end of the ship. This was more efficient than the arrangement used in previous designs, with both pairs of guns mounted in a central barbette that limited their arcs of fire. The guns were the Pattern B type manufactured by Armstrong Whitworth. These guns fired a 570-kilogram (1,250 lb) capped armor-piercing shells with a 230 kg (507 lb) brown powder charge, which produced a muzzle velocity of 575 metres per second (1,886 ft/s). The guns could elevate to 15 degrees and depress to −5 degrees; elevation was controlled by hand, and loading required the guns to be elevated to 15 degrees.

They carried a secondary battery of eight 152 mm (6 in) 40-caliber guns placed singly in shielded mounts atop the upper deck, with four on each broadside. Close-range defense against torpedo boats was provided by a battery of sixteen 120 mm (4.7 in) guns in casemates in the upper deck aboard Re Umberto, eight on each broadside. Sicilia and Sardegna both had twenty of these guns, with ten per side. These were supported by sixteen 57 mm (2.24 in) 43-caliber guns and ten 37 mm (1.5 in) guns. As was customary for capital ships of the period, they carried five 450 mm (17.7 in) torpedo tubes in above-water launchers. The torpedoes carried a 41 kg (90 lb) warhead and had a range of 400 m (1,300 ft) at a speed of 30 knots (56 km/h; 35 mph).

Re Umberto in dry dock c. 1897

The ships were lightly armored for their size; the savings in weight allowed for the high top speed, which was typical for Italian capital ships of the period. This was especially true of those designed by Brin, who argued that armor technology of the time could not defeat contemporary heavy guns. The ships' armor consisted of steel manufactured by Schneider-Creusot. They were protected by belt armor that was 102 mm (4 in) thick, with an armored deck that was 76 mm (3 in) thick. Their forward conning towers were armored with 300 mm (11.8 in) of steel plate on the sides. Their main battery turrets had 4 in thick faces and the supporting barbettes had 349 mm (13.75 in) thick steel. The secondary guns had 51 mm (2 in) thick gun shields.

== Construction ==
Construction data
| Name | Builder | Laid down | Launched | Completed |
|---|---|---|---|---|
| Re Umberto | Regio Cantiere di Castellammare di Stabia | 10 July 1884 | 17 October 1888 | 16 February 1893 |
| Sicilia | Venetian Arsenal | 3 November 1884 | 6 July 1891 | 4 May 1895 |
| Sardegna | Arsenale di La Spezia | 24 October 1885 | 20 September 1890 | 16 February 1895 |

== Service history ==
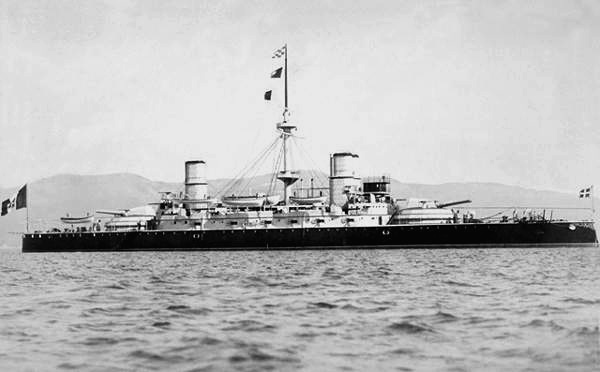
Sardegna early in her career

For their first decade in service, all three ships saw duty in the Active Squadron of the Italian fleet, though their early careers were uneventful. Re Umberto and Sardegna made visits to Britain and Germany in 1895, the latter for the opening of the Kaiser Wilhelm Canal. The ships were involved in an international naval demonstration off Crete in 1897 before the Greco-Turkish War. In 1905, all three ships were transferred to the Reserve Squadron, having been supplanted by the more modern pre-dreadnought battleships of the Ammiraglio di Saint Bon and Regina Margherita classes.

The three ships saw significant action during the Italo-Turkish War of 1911–1912, primarily conducting operations in support of Italian troops fighting in Libya. From October to December 1911, the ships were stationed off Tripoli, where they bombarded Ottoman defenses to prepare for the initial landing and then provided fire support to Italian forces after they had seized the city. After returning to Italy for resupply, the ships were tasked with escorting troop convoys to attack other ports in Libya from June to August 1912.

After the war, Sicilia became a depot ship for the new dreadnought Giulio Cesare in Taranto, and Re Umberto became a depot ship in Genoa. After Italy entered World War I in 1915, Sardegna was stationed in Venice as the flagship of the naval forces defending the port and Re Umberto returned to service as a floating battery in Brindisi. After the catastrophic defeat at the Battle of Caporetto in November 1917, Sardegna was withdrawn from Venice to Brindisi, and later to Taranto. In 1918, Re Umberto was converted into an assault ship for the planned attack on the main Austro-Hungarian naval base at Pola, but the war ended before the attack could be carried out. She was stricken in 1920 and broken up for scrap; Sicilia and Sardegna followed in 1923.
