= Simone Antonio Saint-Bon =

Italian admiral (1828–1892)

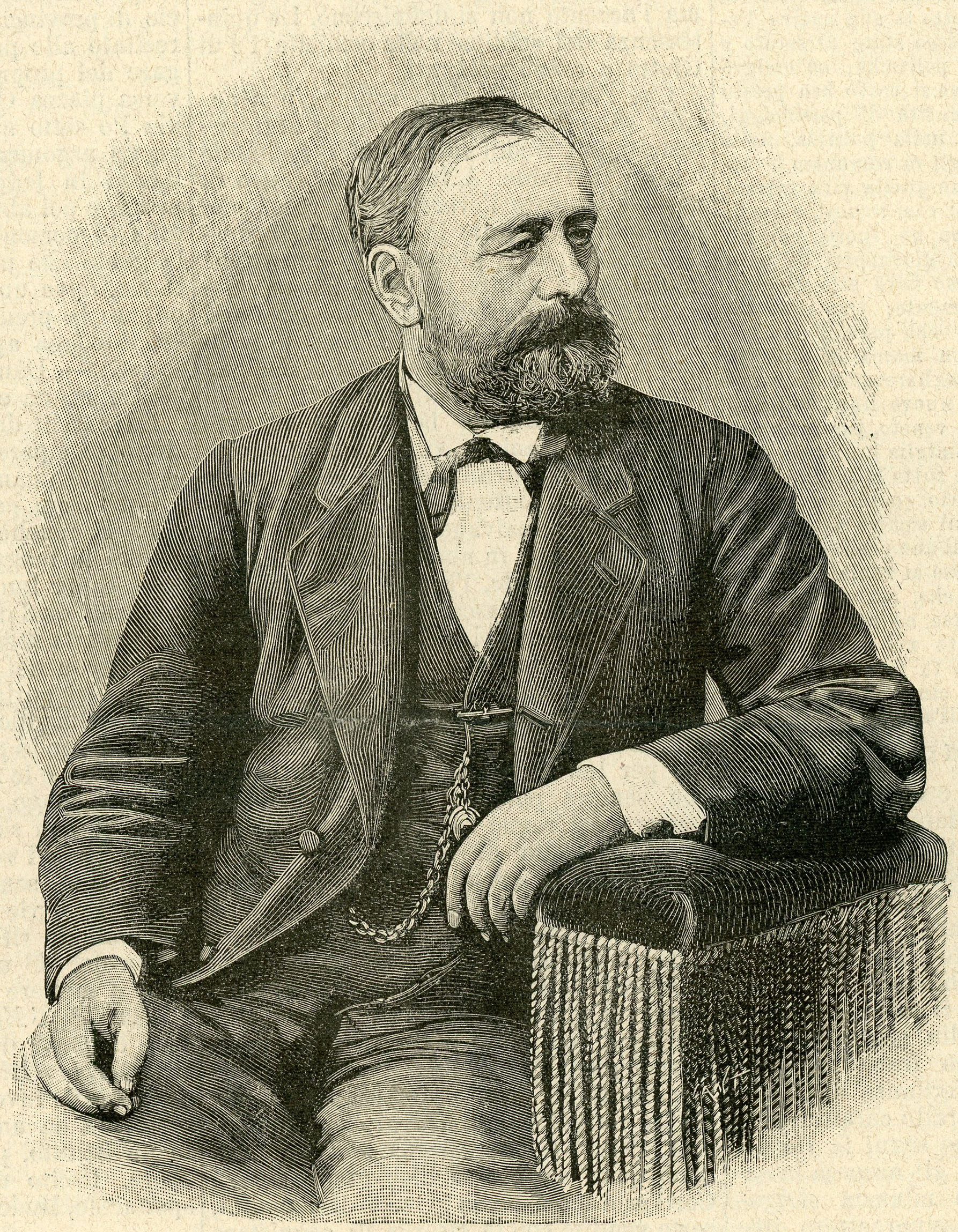
Simone Pacoret de Saint-Bon

Simone Antonio Pacoret de Saint-Bon (March 20, 1828 – November 26, 1892) was an admiral of the Italian Regia Marina ("Royal Navy").

Saint-Bon was born at Chambéry, now in France, then part of the Kingdom of Sardinia.

Leaving the Naval Academy in 1847, he attained the rank of commander in 1860, and that of vice-admiral in 1867. He took part in the Crimean War, distinguished himself in 1860 at the siege of Ancona, and was decorated for valor at the Siege of Gaeta. At the Battle of Lissa in 1866, his vessel, the ironclad Formidabile, forced the entrance of the port of San Giorgio di Lissa and silenced the Austrian artillery batteries, for which exploit he received the Gold Medal of Military Valor. In 1873 he was elected to the Chamber of Deputies and appointed by Prime Minister Marco Minghetti to be Minister of the Navy, in which position he revolutionized the Regia Marina. Insisting upon the need for large battleships with high powers of attack and defense, and capable of fighting as single units, he introduced the colossal types of which the ironclad battleships Duilio and Enrico Dandolo were the earliest examples. Falling from power with the Right in 1876, he resumed active naval service, but in 1891 was again appointed Minister of the Navy.

He died at Rome on 26 November 1892, while still in office. He is remembered in Italy as the originator of the modern Italian fleet.

== Commemoration ==
Two ships of the Regia Marina were named after him:

- The battleship Ammiraglio di Saint Bon, commissioned in 1901.
- The submarine Ammiraglio Saint-Bon, a Cagni-class submarine commissioned in 1940.
