= Demonstration (military) =

Diversionary military manoeuvre

In military terminology, a demonstration is an attack or show of force on a front where a decision is not sought, made with the aim of deceiving the enemy.

An example of a demonstration in the American Civil War was at the Battle of Gettysburg where, on July 2, 1863, General Robert E. Lee ordered Lieutenant General Richard S. Ewell to stage a demonstration against Culp's Hill on the Union right flank while Lieutenant General James Longstreet launched the main attack against the Union left flank.

A related diversionary maneuver, the feint, involves actual contact with the enemy, unlike a demonstration.
