= Regina Margherita-class battleship =

Pre-dreadnought battleship class of the Italian Royal Navy

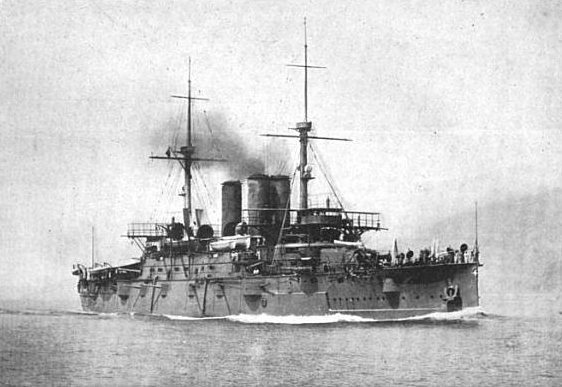
- Regina Margherita on speed trials in July 1904

Class overview
- Name: Regina Margherita
- Builders: Arsenale di La Spezia; R C di Castellammare di Stabia
- Operators: Regia Marina
- Preceded by: Ammiraglio di Saint Bon class
- Succeeded by: Regina Elena class
- Built: 1898–1905
- In commission: 1904–1916
- Completed: 2
- Lost: 2

General characteristics (Regina Margherita)
- Type: Pre-dreadnought battleship
- Displacement: Normal: 13,215 long tons (13,427 t); Full load: 14,093 long tons (14,319 t)
- Length: 138.65 m (454 ft 11 in)
- Beam: 23.84 m (78 ft 3 in)
- Draft: 9 m (29 ft 6 in)
- Installed power: 28 × Niclausse boilers; 21,790 ihp (16,249 kW)
- Propulsion: 2 × triple-expansion steam engines; 2 × screw propellers
- Speed: 20 knots (37 km/h; 23 mph)
- Range: 10,000 nmi (18,520 km; 11,508 mi) at 10 kn (19 km/h; 12 mph)
- Complement: 812–900
- Armament: 4 × 305 mm (12 in)/40 guns; 4 × 203 mm (8 in)/45 guns; 12 × 152 mm (6 in)/40 guns; 20 × 76 mm (3 in)/40 guns; 2 × 47 mm (1.9 in)/40 guns; 2 × 37 mm (1.5 in)/40 guns; 4 × 450 mm (17.7 in) torpedo tubes
- Armor: Belt and side: 152 mm; Deck: 79 mm (3.1 in); Turrets: 203 mm; Conning tower: 152 mm; Casemates: 152 mm

The Regina Margherita class was a class of two battleships built for the Italian Regia Marina between 1898 and 1905. The class comprised two ships: Regina Margherita and Benedetto Brin. The ships were designed by the latter's namesake, Benedetto Brin, who died before the ships were completed. They were armed with a main battery of four 12 in (305 mm) guns and could steam at a speed of 20 knots (37 km/h; 23 mph).

Both ships saw extensive service with the Italian fleet for the first decade of their careers. They saw action in the Italo-Turkish War of 1911–1912, where they participated in the seizure of Cyrenaica in North Africa and operations in the eastern Mediterranean Sea. They were reduced to training ships by World War I, and both ships were lost with heavy death tolls during the conflict. Benedetto Brin exploded in Brindisi in September 1915, and Regina Margherita struck a mine and sank in December 1916.

== Design ==
After the negative experience with the preceding Ammiraglio di Saint Bon-class battleships, which were too weak to engage foreign counterparts and too slow to catch cruisers, the Italian navy wanted a new battleship that returned to a larger, more effective size. In particular, they wanted to be able to challenge the new Habsburg-class battleships being built in neighboring Austria-Hungary. They returned to the 12-inch (305 mm) gun that was standard in most other navies of the day, but sacrificed armor protection to achieve high speed. As such, the ships represented a hybrid type that merged the firepower of the slow battleships and the speed of a cruiser. Benedetto Brin initially wanted to arm the ships with only two of the 12-inch guns and twelve 8 in (203 mm) guns, but after his death, Admiral Ruggero Alfredo Micheli altered the design to double the number of 12-inch guns, at the expense of eight of the medium-caliber pieces.

=== General characteristics and machinery ===
Plan and profile drawing of the Regina Margherita class

The Regina Margherita-class ships were 130 meters (426 ft 6 in) long at the waterline and 138.65 m (454 ft 11 in) long overall. They had a beam of 23.84 m (78 ft 3 in); Regina Margherita had a draft of 8.81 m (28 ft 11 in), while Benedetto Brin drew slightly more, at 9 m (29 ft 6 in). They displaced 13,215 long tons (13,427 t) at normal loading and at full combat load, Regina Margherita displaced 14,093 long tons (14,319 t) while Benedetto Brin, slightly heavier, displaced 14,737 long tons (14,973 t). Their hulls were equipped with a double bottom.

The vessels had a fairly large superstructure, which included an unusual pair of conning towers with bridges, one forward and one aft. The ships were built with a ram bow and had a raised forecastle deck. They had two masts, both with fighting tops; the foremast was located directly behind the forward conning tower and bridge. The ships' crew varied over the course of their careers, ranging from 812 to 900 officers and enlisted men.

The ships' propulsion system consisted of two triple-expansion steam engines, which drove a pair of screw propellers. Steam for the engines was provided by twenty-eight coal-fired water-tube Niclausse boilers in Regina Margherita. Benedetto Brin meanwhile was equipped with the same number of Belleville boilers. The boilers were vented into three funnels, two of which were placed side by side. The lead ship's engines were rated at 21,790 indicated horsepower (16,250 kW), while Benedetto Brin's were slightly less efficient, at 20,475 ihp (15,268 kW). The two ships had a top speed of 20 kn (37 km/h; 23 mph) and a range of approximately 10,000 nautical miles (19,000 km; 12,000 mi) at 10 kn (19 km/h; 12 mph).

=== Armament and armor ===
The shaded areas show the parts of the ships protected by armor

The ships were armed with a main battery of four 12 in (305 mm) 40-caliber guns placed in two twin gun turrets, one forward and one aft. They were also equipped with a secondary battery of four 8 in (203 mm) 40-cal. guns in casemates in the superstructure at the corners, two firing forward and two astern. The ships carried a tertiary battery of twelve 6 in (152 mm) 40-cal. guns, also in casemates in the side of the hull. Close-range defense against torpedo boats was provided by a battery of twenty 3 in (76 mm) 40-cal. guns. The ships also carried a pair of 47 mm (1.9 in) guns, two 37 mm (1.5 in) guns, and two 10 mm (0.39 in) Maxim guns. The Regina Margherita-class battleships were also equipped with four 17.7 in (450 mm) torpedo tubes placed in the hull below the waterline.

The ships of the Regina Margherita class were protected with Harvey steel manufactured in Terni. The main belt was 6 in (152 mm) thick, and the deck was 3.1 in (79 mm) thick. The conning tower and the casemate guns were also protected by 6 in of armor plating. The main battery guns had stronger armor protection, at 8 in (203 mm) thick. Coal was used extensively in the protection scheme, including a layer intended to protect the ships' internals from underwater damage.

== Ships of the class ==
Construction data
Name	Builder	Laid down	Launched	Completed
Regina Margherita	Arsenale di La Spezia	20 November 1898	30 May 1901	14 April 1904
Benedetto Brin	Regio Cantiere di Castellammare di Stabia	30 January 1899	7 November 1901	1 September 1905

== Service history ==
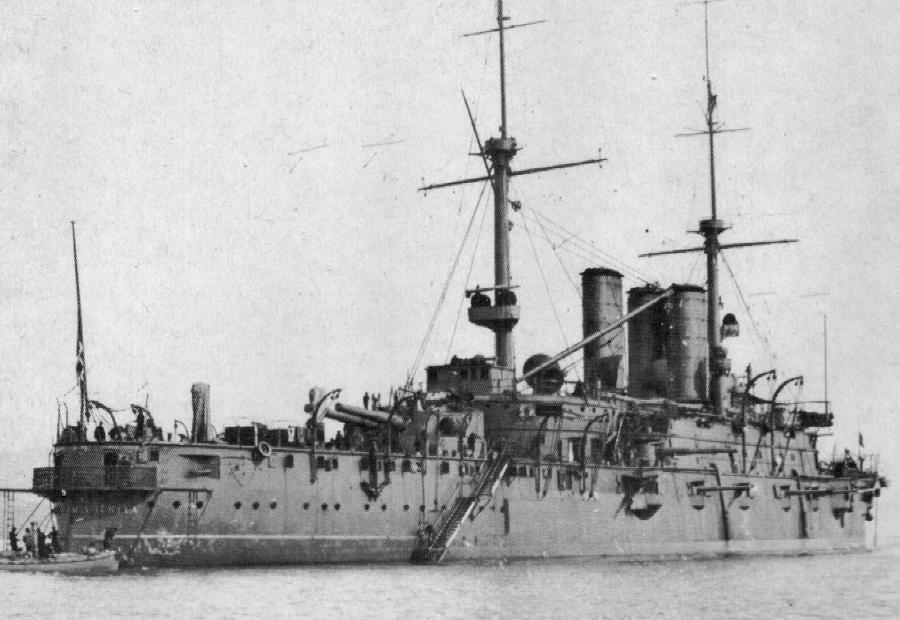
Regina Margherita circa 1908; note the arrangement of the secondary battery and the belt armor

Both Regina Margherita and Benedetto Brin served in the active duty squadron for the first few years of their careers, and participated in the peacetime routine of fleet training. Regina Margherita frequently served as the fleet flagship before the completion of the new Regina Elena-class battleships. On 29 September 1911, Italy declared war on the Ottoman Empire, starting the Italo-Turkish War. The two ships saw action during the war in the 3rd Division in the 2nd Squadron. Benedetto Brin took part in the attack on Tripoli in October 1911, and both were involved in the campaign to seize Rhodes in the eastern Mediterranean Sea.

Italy initially remained neutral during World War I, but by 1915, had been convinced by the Triple Entente to enter the war against Germany and Austria-Hungary. Both the Italians and Austro-Hungarians adopted a cautious fleet policy in the confined waters of the Adriatic Sea, and so the two Regina Margherita-class battleships did not see action. Benedetto Brin served as a training ship based in Brindisi until she was destroyed in an internal explosion in the harbor on 27 September 1915 with heavy loss of life; 454 men of the ship's crew died in the explosion. Regina Margherita, also serving as a training ship, served for somewhat longer, until she struck a mine laid by the German submarine SM UC-14 on the night of 11–12 December 1916. Some 675 men were killed in the sinking.
