= Inverted bow =

Bow whose furthest forward point is not at the top

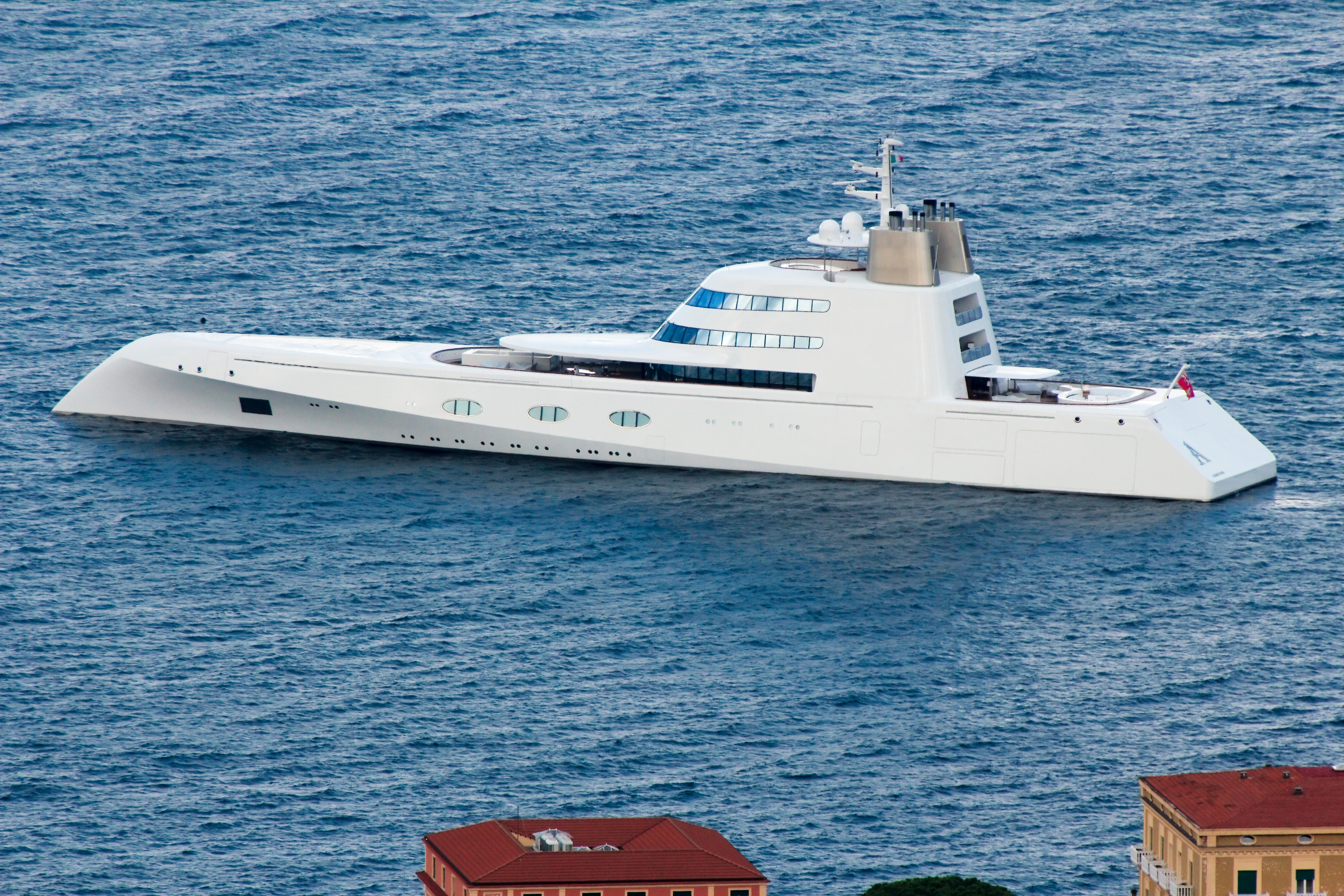
M/Y A cruising at Sorrento, Italy in 2012.

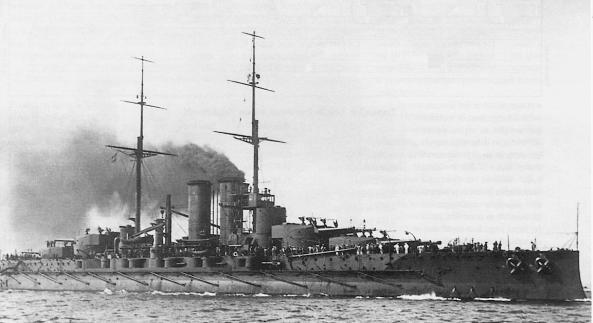
SMS Viribus Unitis, a dreadnought type ship with inverted bow, flagship of the Austro-Hungarian navy in 1912.

In ship design, an inverted bow (occasionally also referred to as reverse bow) is a ship's or large boat's bow whose furthest forward point is not at the top. The result may somewhat resemble a submarine's bow. Inverted bows maximize the length of waterline and hence the hull speed, and often have better hydrodynamic drag than ordinary bows. On the other hand, they have very little reserve buoyancy and tend to dive under waves instead of piercing or going over them.

Inverted bows were popular on battleships and large cruisers in the early 20th century. They fell out of favour, as they were extremely wet at high speeds and in heavy seas, but have made a comeback on modern ship design.

== Examples ==
=== Motor Yacht "A" ===
The 390 ft luxury motor yacht M/Y "A" has an inverted bow, along with a tumblehome hull design.

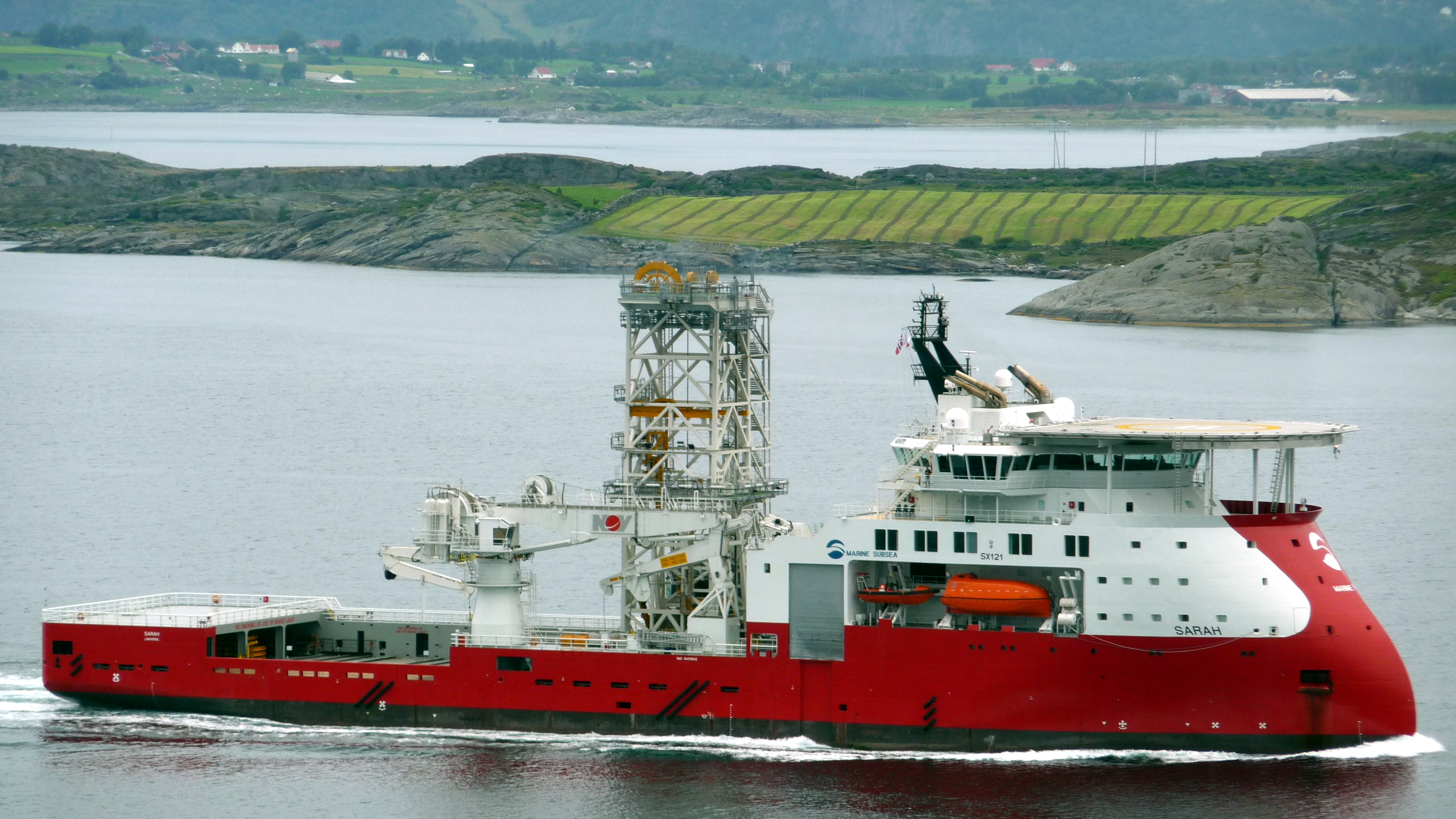
Well intervention vessel Sarah with X-Bow.

=== Ulstein X-Bow ===
The Ulstein X-Bow (or just X-BOW) is an inverted ship's bow designed by Ulstein Group to improve handling in rough seas, and to lower fuel consumption by causing less hydrodynamic drag. It is shaped somewhat like a submarine's bow.

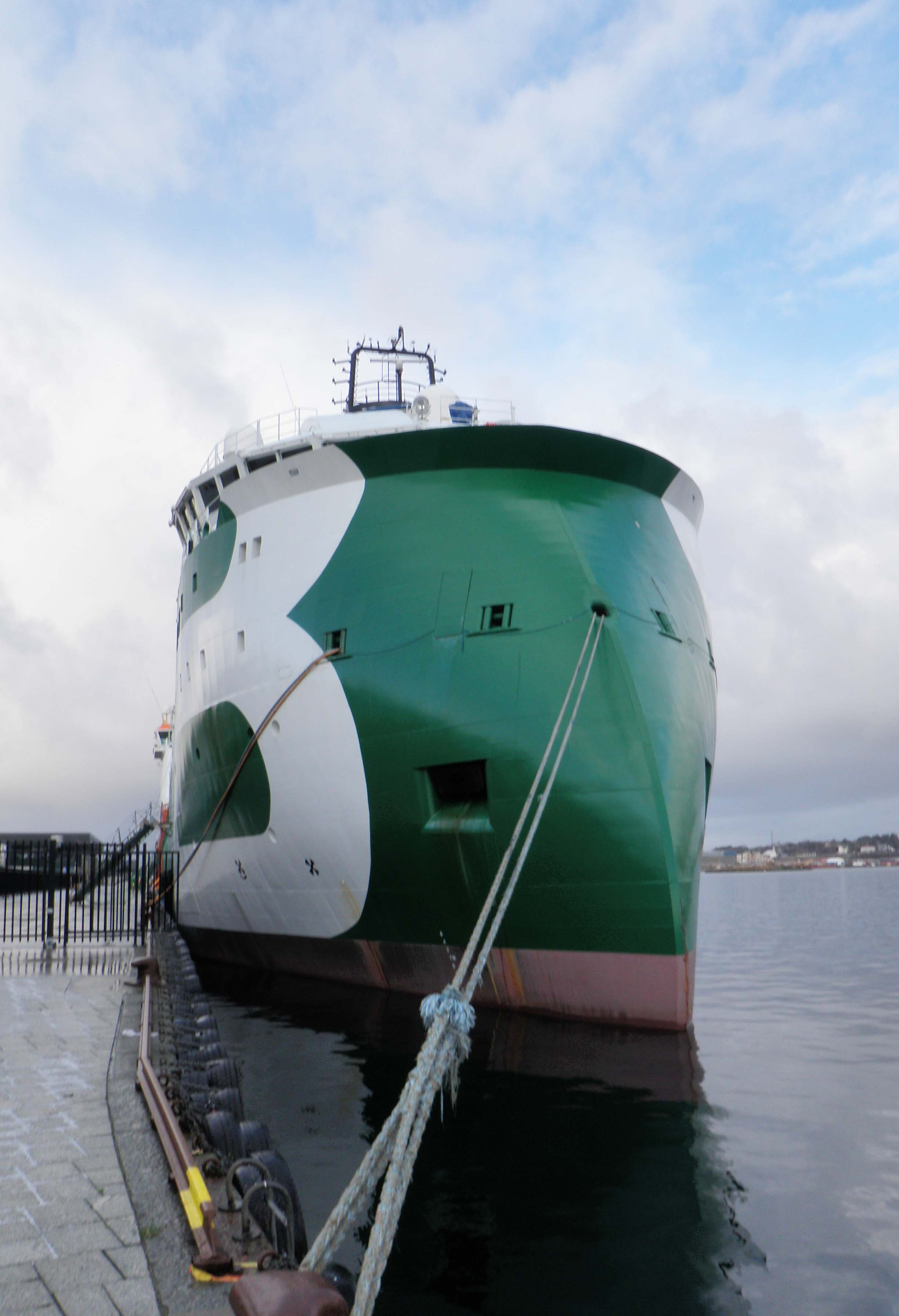
Bourbon Orca anchor tug, shown in 2012, was the first ship built with an Ulstein X-Bow in 2006.

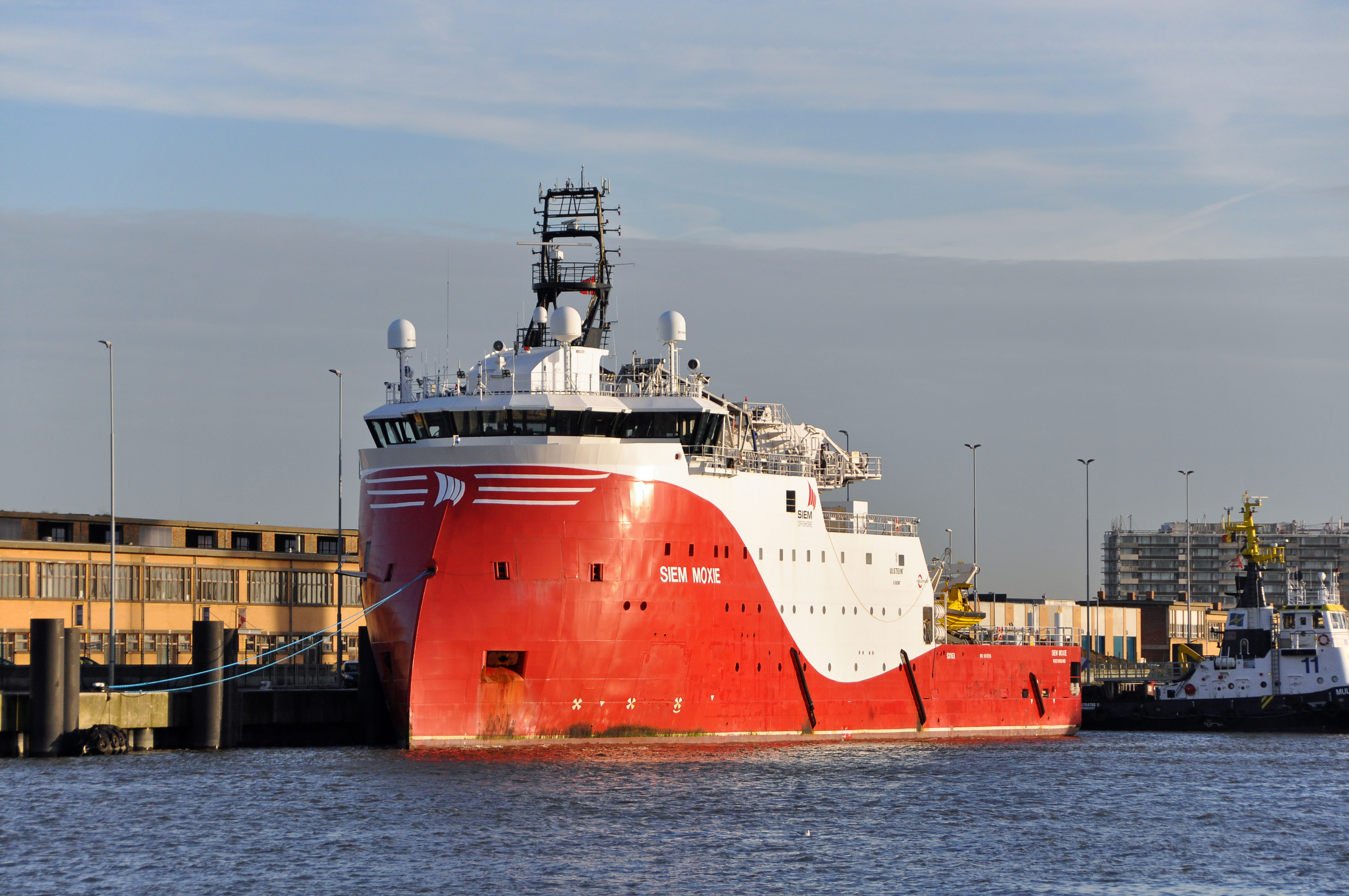
Norwegian offshore support vessel Siem Moxie.

The MV Bourbon Orca, design AX104, is an Ulstein A-Series anchor handling tug supply vessel (AHTS) built for Bourbon Offshore Norway, the Norwegian division of the French Groupe Bourbon, and was the first ship built with the Ulstein X-bow in 2006. She was awarded Ship of the Year 2006, both by Skipsrevyen and Offshore Support Journal. In 2007, the Bourbon Orca design model was included in the London Science Museum's display of innovative technology. The vessel's operator claims that the design achieves higher speed and a calmer motion in head, rough seas. Originally developed for offshore oil and gas vessels, the design has entered new segments such as yachts, cruise vessels, offshore wind and fisheries. In 2017, a US cruise company ordered the first four X-BOW cruise ships for arctic ice conditions, and Lindblad Expeditions also ordered two such expedition cruise vessels.

The number of X-BOW vessels contracted and or delivered reached the 100 mark in 2017. Later developments from the X-BOW are the X-STERN and TWIN X-STERN hull line designs.

=== Zumwalt-class destroyer ===
The bow of the Zumwalt-class stealth guided missile destroyer for the United States Navy is also inverted. It has a wave-piercing tumblehome hull form whose sides slope inward above the waterline.

== See also ==
- Axe bow – Wave-piercing type of a ship's bow
- Bulbous bow – Protruding bulb at the front of a ship
- Naval ram – Naval melee weapon
