= Sanmen Bay Affair =

Historical event

- Part of Scramble for China
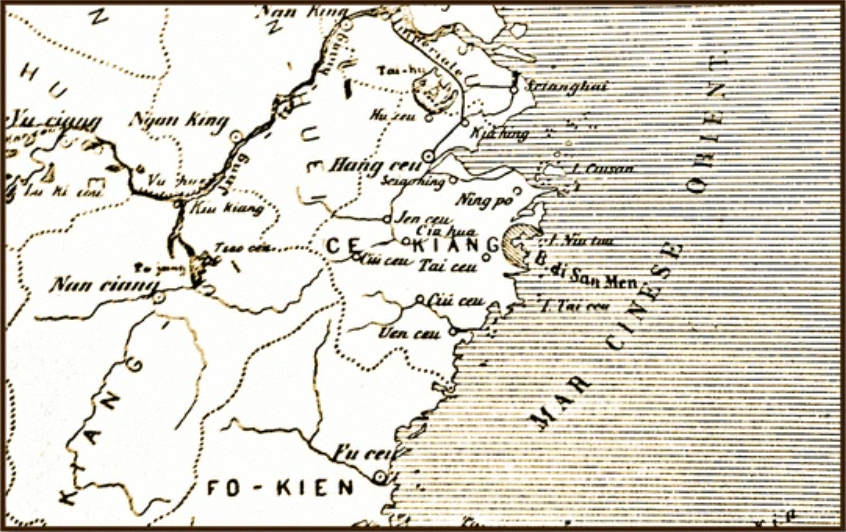
- An Italian map showcasing the claimed territory of Sanmen Bay (1899)
Date	2 March 1899 – 2 May 1899
Location	Sanmen County, Qing Dynasty
Result	Qing victory
Territorial changes	Qing keeps Sanmen Bay under its domain

Belligerents
Kingdom of Italy; Supported by United Kingdom; German Empire; Peking Syndicate	Qing Dynasty; Zongli Yamen

Commanders and leaders
Luigi Pelloux; Felice Napoleone Canevaro; Edoardo Incoronato; Renato De Martino; Claude MacDonald	Empress Dowager Cixi

Strength
Italian cruiser Marco Polo; Italian cruiser Elba	

The Sanmen Bay Affair was a series of diplomatic confrontations between the Kingdom of Italy and the Qing Empire over Sanmen Bay and its adjacent territories and islands. It is known as the only instance in which the Qing Empire refused to give away a concession to any European colonial power.

== Background ==
=== First Sino-Italian interactions (1860–1878) ===
Old City, Shanghai, had various nationalities within it, including the Italians. However, Italian political presence in China only dated back to the 1860s. The very first Italian nation to establish a consulate in China was the Kingdom of Sardinia-Piedmont, doing so in 1860. From then on, the successor state of Sardinia-Piedmont, the Kingdom of Italy, continued to detain diplomatic relations with the Qing Dynasty for the following decades.

Despite the presence of relations between the two nations, many Italian businesses were not content and wanted economic ties between Italy and China to strengthen to increase profit. That is why, inspired by the Sino-Danish treaty of 1863, Italy signed the Sino-Italian Treaty of 1866.

Despite the ratification of the treaty however, the Kingdom of Italy, did not gain the desired effect. Due to the weakness of Italy on an international scale the prospects of trade and influence that the Italians had envisioned in 1866 had not been achieved. It is worth noting however, that up until 1898 Italy had made no other direct moves as to impose its influence in China. This was due to a lack of geographic knowledge in the area, troubling Italian bureaucracy and a lack of sinologists when compared to other European powers.

=== Growing Italian interest in China (1878–1898) ===
==== The first permanent consulate in China ====
Italy started to truly interest itself in Chinese affairs (and in the Scramble for China) by the end of 1878, when, after the growth of Japan following the Meiji Restoration, the Italian Ministry of Foreign Affairs started to feel the need to distinguish its relations between China and Japan separately (up until then, they were treated within the same "diplomatic bubble"). Thus, Italy sent consul Ferdinando de Luca to Shanghai, the very first permanent consul in China. During his period there, Italy had its first direct role in Chinese politics, protecting the rights of the Jesuits missionaries located in China, for example the Jesuit settlement of Zikaweiwith (present in China since 1847), with the support of France.

==== The Peking Syndicate and British support ====
Italian interests started to develop even more after the fall of the Crispi government, following the defeat at Adwa. The First Pelloux Government and the Second Pelloux Government heavily incentivized Italian initiatives and interests within the Qing Dynasty and supported the initiative of the British-Italian funded "Pekin Syndicate".

The Pekin Syndicate was created in 1897 by knight of the Civil Order of Savoy Angelo Luzzatti and Carlo Starabba di Rudinì, a conservative and someone who heavily opposed any other "adventures" in Africa after the Slap of Tunis and the Battle of Adwa (He was the son of Antonio Starabba, Marchese di Rudinì). The objective of the Syndicate was to obtain concessions out of the Qing Empire as to profit off of the construction of railways, the creation of a local Sino-Anglo-Italian bank, find a resource suitable for exploitation and create a supply chain to increase the sale of weaponry to the Qing after their interests towards armament grew.

The company had initial success thanks to Luzzatti's close ties with Kien-chang, who in his previous years had a significant political career as the rappresentative of the Qing in Joseon and was one of the heads of "China Merchant’s" company. Kien-Chang was close with Li Hongzhang and personally presented him with the Luzzatti's proposal, which interested him. In fact, in 1899, he would remit £4,203 through the Hongkong Bank, suggesting to his friend Lord Rothschild to purchase deferred shares of the Peking Syndicate. The company's ambitions were supported by investors from the United Kingdom which saw the company's expansion into China as a possibility for revenue, including its pressures towards the Italian government to push for a concession in China. Whilst skeptic, the British Empire would thus partly support Italy's claims in China on the conditions that it was done through diplomatic means.

== The Sanmen Bay Incident ==
=== Preparations ===
In 1898, after witnessing the German Empire's takeover of the Kiautschou Bay Leased Territory, Minister of Foreign Affairs Felice Napoleone Canevaro believed in the project of the Peking Syndicate and thus told the Italian ambassador in Beijing, Renato De Martino, to prepare initiatives to identify and buy a suitable bay on the coast of China. Renato De Martino supported the initiative, especially after witnessing another crucial event in late-Qing history, that is the coup following the Hundred Days' Reform. He would go on to comment that the Qing Dynasty had become weak and impotent and that the nation was currently being led by "incompetent imbeciles". Edoardo Incoronato, the captain of the Italian vessel "Marco Polo" also supported the initiative, supporting a transformation of specifically Sanmen Bay as a coal station under the direct control of Italy and commented that the Qing Dynasty, whilst initially reluctant, would have never outright refused Italian demands.

Whilst there was a lot of support, the first words of dissent started to pop up even before any kind of initiative was taken. For example, Giuseppe Salvago Raggi pointing out that the German Empire, unlike Italy, had a more intense history of relations with China, a greater influence and had prepared for years for their own operation. The Royal Army General Staff also did not really like the idea, warning the navy and the Ministry of Foreign Affairs of the dangers of such an initiative.

De Martino eventually ordered Incoronato to analyze the coastal area and find a suitable spot to colonize. There were various spots that were analyzed, such as Nimrod, Sanmen e San-sah. He eventually selected Sanmen, commenting:

The bay of San Mun (Sanmen) is surrounded by mountains, almost all of which plunge steeply into the sea. […] There is little grazing livestock and no trade, as the bay is still closed to commercial exchange. The climate is generally good, but the population is sparse. […] The inhabitants are quiet and peaceful by nature, and live off the land […] The bay is large enough to accommodate the most powerful fleet in the world, and any ship can anchor there. […] The commanders of various Italian and British warships agree that the bay offers excellent anchorage. [...] The province of Kekiang (Zhejiang) is also quite mountainous, but the communication routes and the many navigable rivers greatly facilitate trade with the interior. There are also mines of copper, tin, silver, iron, and lead. [...] In addition, the province produces a wide range of goods, including tea, indigo, cotton, silk, bamboo products, wool, paper, and ink, in such abundance that these products can be exported on a large scale.

— "Comment from Incoronato on a possible Italian outpost in China". Corriere della Sera. 17 March 1899. p. 1.

Upon having located the most location, Italy tried to get the support of France and asked for confirmation for the support of the United Kingdom once again. In his letter to Britain, Canevaro would reveal the chosen location and also suggest the creation of an economical exclusive area in the region of the Chekiang Province as well as the construction of a railway that would start from Sanmen and reach all the way to Poyang lake. Britain confirmed its diplomatic (however, not military) support on the condition that Italy would not extend its economical exclusion zone on the shores of the Yangtze river and that the Italian directly controlled territories would not expand past the Sanmen Bay. Italy would then go on to get the approval (not direct support) of the United States and Japan, whilst getting the open support of the German Empire.

Meanwhile, in the Chamber of Deputies various members, including Carlo di Rudinì, called for an immediate direct intervention against the Qing, however, due to British demands on the approach that had to be taken when confronted with China, and the previous humiliations in other colonies, Emilio Visconti Venosta opposed the idea, saying it was against Italy's own interests to militarily intervene against the Qing Dynasty.

=== The request to the Zongli Yamen ===
Italy presented its demands to the Zongli Yamen through its diplomats on 28 February 1899, and later sent a written version of the demands to its office on 2 March 1899 as requested by the Zongli Yamen itself.

Due to Visconti's opposition to a military approach towards the Qing Dynasty, the military personnel sent alongside the Italian diplomatic mission was limited and was instructed mostly to protect the Italian citizens directed towards Zongli Yamen. This meant by the time the demand was sent to the Qing's offices, only a few ships, sailors and soldiers were sent.

The letter sent on 2 March was later sent back to the Italian delegation with cold and direct rejection. Alongside the rejected proposal letter there was also a brief communication stating that "after much consideration", the Qing Empire was confident in saying that if they were to respond truthfully about what they thought about the proposal, the relations between the two nations would be damaged. The most humiliating thing for Italy was that upon receiving the rejected letter, it was still within its envelope, suggesting the Chinese officials had not even bothered to read it.

De Martino was furious and referred to his British counterpart, Mac Donald, about the incident. He then reported back to Italian officials, including Incoronato who scolded De Martino for telling everything to the British officials, seeing it as an utter national embarrassment.

Meanwhile, in China, a campaign of mocking had officially begun with China starting rumors that the Italian diplomat was left alone in the negotiation room in the middle of his initial in-person visit and ridiculing Italy as a "backward nation".

De Martino, frustrated about the humiliation on himself and Italy, stated that this kind of disrespect could prove to become a casus belli to militarily intervene in Qing China, opposing Venosta's diplomatic approach. The Italian government agreed and asked him if there were enough troops and equipment to start a proper war with the Qing Dynasty. After consulting with the Italian commandry stationed in Beijing, De Martino confirmed it was possible to pursue a military intervention against the Qing Dynasty.

=== The ultimatum ===
On 8 March 1899 at 12:30, Canevaro authorized De Martino to send a 4-day ultimatum to the Qing dynasty. However, soon after Canevaro sent the telegram he faced immediate backlash from within the Chamber of Deputies and the British diplomatic corp in Italy, both with a significant portion of members begging him to either not humiliate Italy even further or to not become an aggressor.

Thus, having changed his mind Canevaro sent another telegram at 16:20 stating that his prior telegram was to be ignored and to continue through diplomatic means. However, it seems the second telegram arrived before the first, legally invalidating its content, and De Martino willingly ignored the second telegram's instructions out of his own will. Upon reading about it on Reuters, Canevaro sent De Martino back to Italy and sent another telegram, this time to the Qing authorities:

Our accredited minister in China, De Martino, presented a note to initiate negotiations for the transfer of San-mun (Sanmen) Bay and for some other advantages. The Chinese government, undoubtedly already prejudiced, instead of accepting our note, rejected it, declaring that it was rejecting it because, being on perfectly friendly terms with Italy, it was more certain of remaining on good terms with us by not discussing the matter than by perhaps continuing to discuss it. We could not accept this kind of excuse. We found the Chinese government's action to be highly improper and requiring immediate redress. [...] The decision was immediate: I telegraphed our minister, disapproving of his action and demanding an explanation. It was clear that the minister, disavowed by us, could no longer remain in such serious circumstances to represent Italy to the Chinese government. At the same time, since the secretary was not present at our legation, but only an interpreter, who, due to his rank, could not bear the grave responsibility of the moment, we ordered our minister to entrust the leadership of the legation in China to the British minister.

— Canevaro's telegram, Giorgio Borsa, Italia e Cina nel secolo XIX, cit., pp. 125-127

British ambassador Mac Donald would take his place, however, initially the British diplomat attempted to make De Martino stay due to the fact that the Qing Empire surprisingly seemed to respond positively to the threats, and was open to concessions (Mac Donald would go as far as to contact Robert Gascoyne-Cecil, 3rd Marquess of Salisbury and Philip Currie, 1st Baron Currie about it, explaining why De Martino had to stay). However, Canevaro insisted on De Martino returning and Francesco Grenet took his place.

Francesco Grenet would never come close to getting its concession again, and by 2 May 1899, the diplomatic mission was over, having failed. Even when Grenet was substituted by Salvago Raggi the most the Chinese could offer was a single mine in Zhejiang. The failure would be one of the reasons of the fall of the First Pelloux government in Italy. Italy would have to wait up until 1901 to get its very first concessions in China, the most notable being the Italian concession of Tianjin.
