= Giuseppe Pasolini =

Italian politician

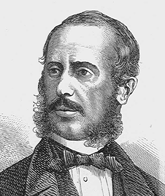
Giuseppe Pasolini

Giuseppe Pasolini (7 February 1815 in Ravenna – 4 December 1876) was an Italian politician.

He initially served as a councilor of the Papal States and advised the pope to name Pellegrino Rossi as leader of the Council in Rome. After Rossi's assassination, he negotiated with Marco Minghetti, but left Rome for Tuscany by 1849. In 1860, he was named a Senator in the Kingdom of Italy. From 1862 to 1863, he was minister of foreign affairs of the Kingdom of Italy. In 1866, he was appointed the royal commissioner of Venice. In 1876, he was appointed President of the Senate, with both the endorsement by the Pope and Minghetti, but soon fell ill and retired. He was a recipient of the Order of Saints Maurice and Lazarus.

A Memoir of Count Giuseppe Pasolini, was compiled by his son was published by his son Count Pier Desiderio Pasolini dall'Onda, and published in 1885 in English with a translation by the Dowager Countess of Dalhousie.

Preceded by Urbano Rattazzi	Minister of Foreign Affairs of the Kingdom of Italy; 1862–1863	Succeeded by Emilio, marquis Visconti-Venosta
