= Peking Syndicate =

Pekin Syndicate
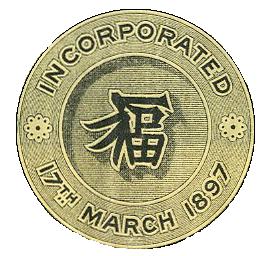
- The logo of the Pekin Syndicate as shown in its documentations
- Founded: March 17, 1897; 128 years ago in London, United Kingdom
- Founder: Angelo Luzzatti and Carlo Starabba di Rudinì
- Defunct: 1961
- Area served: Shansi and Honan

The Pekin Syndicate (Or Peking Syndicate in some sources) was an Anglo-Italian company, founded in London, United Kingdom, that was conceived and incorporated in 1897 and operated within the territories of the Qing Empire, Warlord China , and the People's Republic of China. At one point, the syndicate had become one of the most powerful foreign companies in China.

== History ==
=== Founding and goal ===
The Pekin Syndicate was created in 1897 by a knight of the Civil Order of Savoy, Angelo Luzzatti, and Carlo Starabba di Rudinì, the son of Antonio Starabba, Marchese di Rudinì. The objective of the Syndicate was to obtain concessions out of the Qing Empire to profit from the construction of railways, the creation of a local Sino-Anglo-Italian bank, find a resource suitable for exploitation, and create a supply chain to increase the sale of weaponry to the Qing after their interest in armament grew.

Since its initial founding, the Syndicate had gotten support from investors located in the British Empire and the Kingdom of Italy. Especially, British investors saw the opportunity to use the company to grow their profit and revenue in China through the exploitation of resources.

=== First ventures and affairs ===
Since 1896, Shanxi governor Hu Pinzhi saw the potential of the region he was governing, and thus, wanted to incentivise foreign concessions and investments as to import various mining and capitalistic technique which he planned to adopt. One of the main companies he had allowed to station in Shanxi was the Pekin Syndicate.

In fact, in 1898, the company would see its first big success, securing the rights to Shanxi’s rich coal, petroleum and iron resources. This allowed them to claim one of the most exclusive coal reserves and one of the largest iron reserve in the entire globe (20,000 square miles in Shanxi alone).

Expected figures during those years would be around 900,000 million tons of coal, with a profit of £750,000 annually. The company would continue to prosper by getting railway concessions as an "exploration company" whilst de facto also being a mining company.

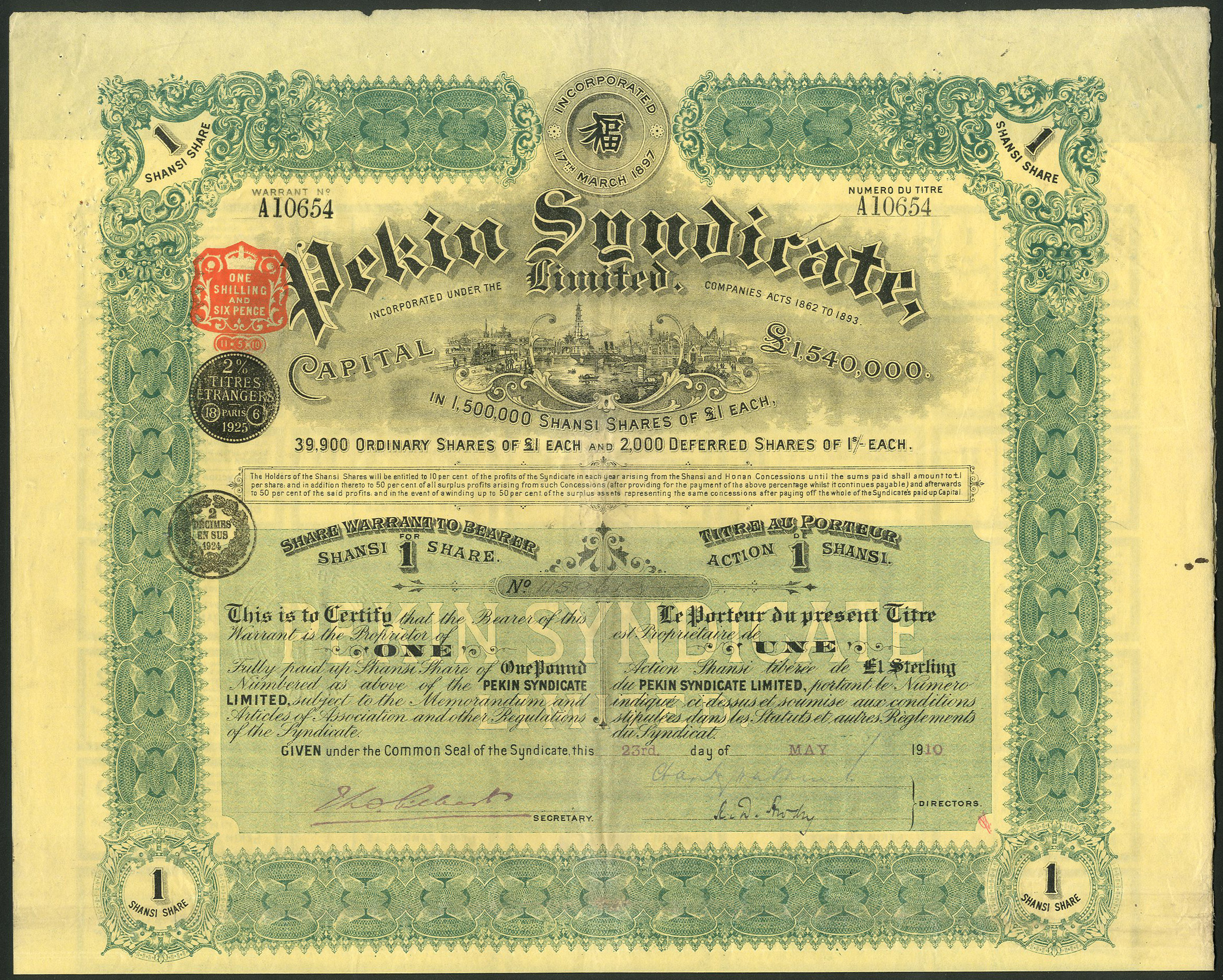
An image of a contract by the Pekin Syndicate

With the support of Hu Pinzhi and Liu E, the Pekin Syndicate was already negotiating deals with the Shangwu ju (Commercial Affairs Bureau). Eventually, the syndicate was granted rights to mine in Changzhi, Jincheng, Pingding Department, Yu County, and also in Linfen. The deal however came with some conditions; The syndicate would have to make revenue return through tax payment and also profit-sharing. On top of that, the syndicate had to promise to turn the operations over to the Chinese after 60 years in a legally binding contract. Another deal would later be made to create a short rail line in northern Henan and southern Shanxi.

By 1898, the Syndicate issued £1,200,000 specially designated "Shansi shares" after failing to secure the creation of a second company.

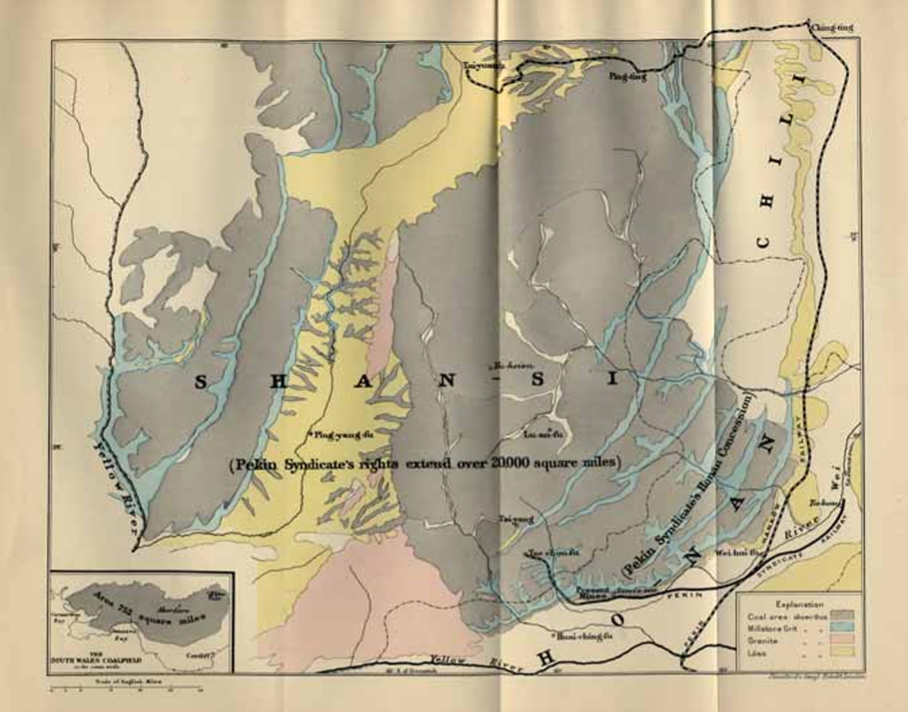
A map of the territories controlled by the Pekin Syndicate in Shaanxi

Luzzatti would get to know Kien-Chang and establish good relations with him. Kien-chang was an ex-catholic Chinese who previously worked as the representative of the Qing in Joseon and was one of the heads of the "China Merchants’" company and had recently entered Li Hongzhang's circle. Luzzatti used his connection with Kien-Chang to obtain £4,203 through the Hong Kong Bank and promote Li Honzhang's and his connections' purchase of the Syndicate's shares. This would all successfully occur in 1899 as Li would remit the sum and even suggested his friend, Lord Rothschild, to purchase some shares.

The company would support Italy's venture in Sanmen Bay and convinced the British government to partly do so as well. The company wanted to gain profit out of the establishment of a permanent Italian settlement in China, and it was interested in the surrounding region and the railway projects proposed by the Italian state.

However, upon Italy's failure to secure Sanmen, many ties with Italy were officially cut, and the British investors started to be seen as more reliable. Defacto, after the failure of Italy's government to secure any concessions, the company had become an "Anglo" company rather than an "Anglo-Italian" company.

=== Issues and decline ===
By May 1899, the power of the Pekin Syndicate had become worrisome to the local population and the Qing government itself. Yuxian and Hu Pizhi both started to agreed that it was a bad idea to give so much land to the Syndicate as it interfered with the local population style of life, the local elite and left little space for Chinese companies to mine said resources. This would lead to reprisals against the Syndicates' officials throughout the Boxer Rebellion. Militias would be mobilised by the pro-Boxer elites and lords of China against the Syndicate, imposing a full blockade of the region as to secure the resources. However, as the rebellion was crushed, the Pekin Syndicate was let inside Shanxi and its other regions once again.

Still, the Rebellion had taken its toll on the Syndicate, and the floods of 1900 disrupted many extraction sites of the company. What did not help was also the continued Chinese opposition to the Syndicate. Despite not being legally able to do much, Chinese regional and state officials would incentivize Chinese mining companies outside of the Syndicate own dominion as to compete with it, for example the Feng Jin kuangwu zong gongsi Company led by Qu Benqiao. Overall, the official position of China was that there needed to be a "Chinese alternative" for those landowners within the regions operated by the Syndicate to sell their stuff. The rise of such companies created tension with the Syndicate, the West and China comparable to those from the Rebellion's years.

Specifically in 1905-1906, numerous workers and student protests against the Syndicate took place, as well as some sparse episodes of violence. These protests saw initial official Chinese and Japanese (for its own interest in the region) support, however, through various political games by 1907 the Syndicate seemed to have initially secured support from London and Beijing, isolating the Shaanxi elite. However, by 1908 the sizes of the protests were hard to ignore and the pressure had increased. This led the Syndicate to allow the Protect-Shanxi Company to mine in those territories that had previously been considered under its monopoly.

The revolutions of 1911 worried the Syndicate, which requested protection from the United Kingdom and the newly formed Chinese Republic soon after. They would receive such protection in the form of a small militia sent by Yuan Shikai. Attempts to secure a monopoly over a second mining era in 1915 would be met with just as much resistance, and ultimately would result in the creation of yet another rival company, the Fu Chung Corporation.

The situation would start to worsen, and the Syndicate would fall under temporary French control, specifically under the financing of the Banque Industrielle de Chine.

In 1927, the forces of Feng Yuxiang ignored the previous agreements established with the Beiyang government and evacuated and later flooded all of the Syndicates mines for a period of 5 years, which would end in 1932 when activities were allowed once again.

By 1936, as to diminish the power of the Syndicate even further, joint marketing with rival Chinese mining companies was enforced by the Kuomintang, with the consequence that the Pekin Syndicate paid but one, half-year dividend. Despite this, there was an initial recovery of the Syndicate around that period, especially thanks to the work of geologist Weng Wenhao, however, even that was ultimately reversed by the Second Sino-Japanese War which caused a refugee and supplement crisis.

By 1946, the core Honan mines were under the People's Liberation Army control. While initial contacts with the new regime seemed promising, later reports revealed executions of local contacts and a deteriorating situation. By the late 1940s, the Syndicate's China operations had effectively ended.

The Syndicate officially closed down in 1961.
