= Raffaele Cappelli =

Italian politician and diplomat

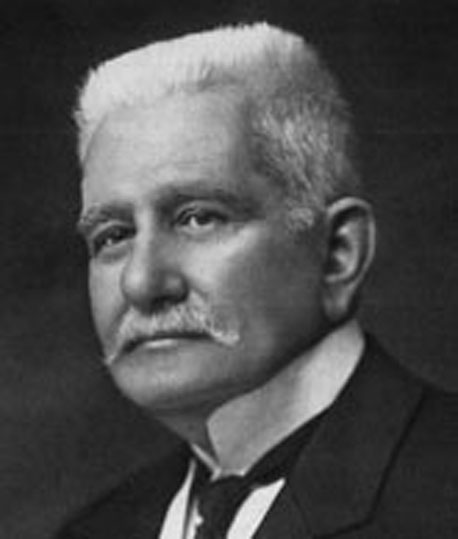
- Raffaele Cappelli

Minister of Foreign Affairs of the Italian kingdom
- In office 1° June 1898 – 29 June 1898
- Preceded by: Emilio Visconti Venosta
- Succeeded by: Felice Napoleone Canevaro

Senator of the Italian Kingdom
- In office 9 December 1919 – 1° June 1921

Personal details
- Born: March 23, 1848 San Demetrio L'Aquila
- Died: 1 June 1921 (aged 73) Roma
- Party: Destra storica
- Spouse: Levi Hirsch
- Education: University of Naples
- Occupation: Politician

Raffaele Cappelli (23 March 1848 – 1 June 1921) was an Italian politician and diplomat. He was born in San Demetrio ne' Vestini, Province of L'Aquila, Abruzzo.

== Honors ==
Grand Officer of Saints Maurice and Lazarus - 23 March 1911

== See also ==
- Ministry of Foreign Affairs (Italy)
- Foreign relations of Italy

Preceded by Emilio Visconti Venosta	Minister of Foreign Affairs of the Kingdom of Italy; 1898–1899	Succeeded by Felice Napoleone Canevaro
