= Luigi Amedeo Melegari =

Italian politician, diplomat and jurist (1805–1881)

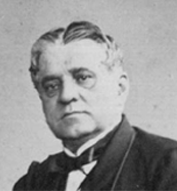
Luigi Amedeo Melegari, 1862

Luigi Amedeo Melegari (19 February 1805 in Castelnovo di Sotto – 22 May 1881) was an Italian politician and diplomat.

He was minister of foreign affairs of the Kingdom of Italy from 1876 to 1877. He served in the Senate of the Kingdom of Italy. He was a recipient of the Order of Saints Maurice and Lazarus. His daughter was the writer Dora Melegari.

Preceded by Emilio, marquis Visconti-Venosta	Minister of Foreign Affairs of the Kingdom of Italy; 1876–1877	Succeeded by Agostino Depretis
