= Dora Melegari =

Swiss writer

- Born: 27 June 1849; Lausanne
- Died: 31 July 1924 (aged 75); Rome
- Occupation: Writer
- Writing career
- Pen name: Thomas Emery

Dora Melegari (27 June 1849 – 31 July 1924) was a Swiss writer who wrote in both French and Italian. Three of her early works were written by a ghost writer. In time she was twice nominated for a Nobel Prize.

== Life ==
Dorette (nickname, "Dora") Melegari was born in Lausanne, 27 June 1849. Her father was the diplomat Luigi Amedeo Melegari and her mother was Marie Caroline Mandrot.

In 1881, Octave Mirbeau ghost-wrote the first of three novels for Melegari. Melegari then wrote her own novels, Her ghost writer eventually published books under his own name.

In 1887, she started writing for the Internationale Revue using the nom de plume of Thomas Emery. She wrote literary reviews and in time took a management role with the magazine. In 1900 she published her most well known work in Paris. This was later translated into Italian as Il sonno delle anime and published in Milan in 1903. Melegari discussed the nature of friendship between women. She criticised women and particularly those of the south for ignoring its benefits. She proposed that this might be because they consider anything that is not love to have little value. Melegari was twice nominated for the Nobel Prize for Literature in 1914 and 1923.

She died in Rome 31 July 1924.

== Works ==
- Dans la vieille rue, Ollendorff, Paris, 1880 (ghost written)
- Expiation, Levy, Paris, 1881
- Les incertitudes de Livie, Ollendorff, Paris, 1881
- Journal intime de Benjamin Costant et lettres a sa famille et ses amis, Ollendorff, Paris, 1886
- Marthe de Thiennes, Levy, Paris, 1886
- La duchesse Ghislamé, Paris, 1895
- Kirie Eleison, Paris, 1896
- Il sonno delle anime, Milan, 1903
- La Giovane Italia e la Giovane Europa. Carteggio inedito tra Giuseppe Mazzini e Luigi Amedeo Melegari, 1906
- Chercheurs de sources, Fischbacher, Paris, 1908
- Caterina Spadaro, Milan, 1908
- In cerca di sorgenti, Milan, 1910
- La città del giglio, Milan, 1911
- La piccola damigella Cristine, Milan, 1913
- Artefici di pene e artefici di gioie, Trier, Milan, 1913
- Ames et visages des femmes, Paris, 1913
- Les Victorieuses, Paris, 1913
- Amici e nemici, Milan, 1914
- Il destarsi delle anime, Milan, 1915
- La resurrezione di Lazzaro, Rome, 1915
