= Italian cruiser Marco Polo =

Italian armored cruiser

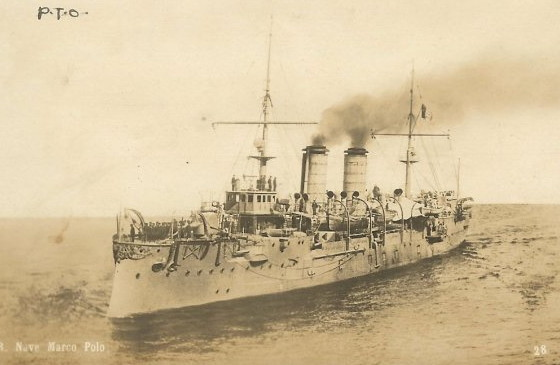
- An Italian postcard of Marco Polo

Class overview
- Operators: Regia Marina
- Preceded by: None
- Succeeded by: Vettor Pisani class

History
- Name: Marco Polo
- Namesake: Marco Polo
- Builder: Regio Cantieri di Castellammare di Stabia, Castellammare di Stabia
- Laid down: 7 January 1890
- Launched: 27 October 1892
- Completed: 21 July 1894
- Renamed: Cortellazo, 4 April 1918
- Reclassified: As troop transport, 4 April 1918
- Name: Cortellazzo
- Renamed: Europa, 1 October 1920
- Stricken: 16 January 1921
- Reinstated: 16 January 1921
- Renamed: Volta, 16 January 1921
- Stricken: 5 January 1922
- Fate: Sold for scrap, 1922

General characteristics
- Type: Armored cruiser
- Displacement: 4,583 t (4,511 long tons)
- Length: 106.05 m (347 ft 11 in) (o/a)
- Beam: 14.67 m (48 ft 2 in)
- Draft: 5.88 m (19 ft 3 in)
- Installed power: 10,000 ihp (7,500 kW); 4 Scotch marine boilers
- Propulsion: 2 shafts, 2 vertical triple-expansion steam engines
- Speed: 17 knots (31 km/h; 20 mph)
- Range: 5,800 nmi (10,700 km; 6,700 mi) at 10 knots (19 km/h; 12 mph)
- Complement: 394
- Armament: 6 single 152 mm (6.0 in) guns; 10 single 120 mm (4.7 in) guns; 9 single 57 mm (2.2 in) Hotchkiss guns; 2 single 37 mm (1.5 in) Hotchkiss guns; 5 × 450 mm (17.7 in) torpedo tubes
- Armor: Belt: 102 mm (4 in); Gun shields: 51 mm (2 in); Deck: 25 mm (1 in); Conning tower: 2 in (51 mm)

Marco Polo was an armored cruiser built for the Royal Italian Navy (Regia Marina) in the 1890s, the first of her type in Italian service. The ship spent the bulk of her career deployed in the Far East. Between deployments she participated in the Italo-Turkish War of 1911–12 during which she caused a diplomatic incident with the Austro-Hungarian Empire. After that affair Marco Polo was sent to Libya where she bombarded the towns of Homs, and Zuara and the defenses of the Dardanelles. In between these operations, the ship provided naval gunfire support to the Royal Italian Army in Libya. Due to her age, Marco Polo did not play a significant role in World War I, serving as an accommodation ship in Venice until she began conversion into a troopship in 1917. After a series of renamings in 1920–21, the ship was stricken from the naval register in 1922 and subsequently sold for scrap.

== Design and description ==
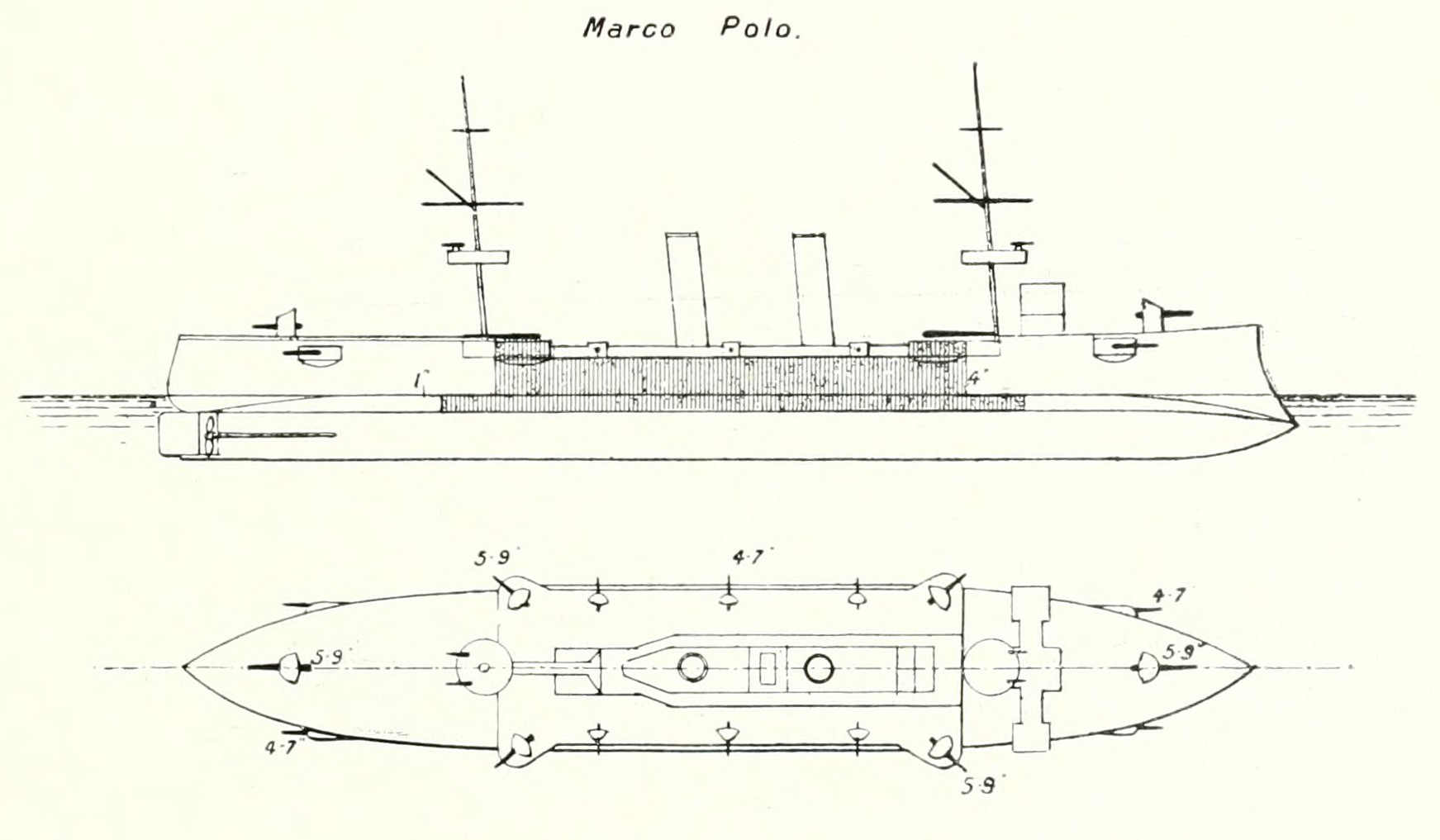
Right elevation and deck plan drawing from Brassey's Naval Annual 1902

Marco Polo was begun as an improved Etna-class protected cruiser, but she was modified while under construction into an armored cruiser, the first such ship in Italian service. The ship had a length between perpendiculars of 99.65 meters (326 ft 11 in) and an overall length of 106.05 meters (347 ft 11 in). She had a beam of 14.67 meters (48 ft 2 in) and a draft of 5.88 meters (19 ft 3 in). Marco Polo displaced 4,583 metric tons (4,511 long tons) at normal load, and about 4,900 metric tons (4,800 long tons) at deep load. The ship had a complement of 22 officers and 372 enlisted men.

She was powered by two vertical triple-expansion steam engines, each driving one propeller shaft. Steam for the engines was supplied by four Scotch marine boilers and their exhausts were trunked into a pair of funnels amidships. Rated at 10,000 indicated horsepower (7,500 kW), her engines were designed to give Marco Polo a speed of 19 knots (35 km/h; 22 mph), but the ship only reached a speed of 17.8 knots (33.0 km/h; 20.5 mph) during her sea trials even though the engines produced 10,663 ihp (7,951 kW). She had a cruising radius of about 5,800 nautical miles (10,700 km; 6,700 mi) at a speed of 10 knots (19 km/h; 12 mph).

Marco Polo's main armament consisted of six 40-caliber 152 mm (6.0 in) guns in single mounts. One of these guns was each mounted at the bow and stern and the remaining four at the corners of the central citadel in armored casemates. Ten 40-caliber 120 mm (4.7 in) guns served as the ship's secondary armament. They were all mounted on the broadside, four in unprotected embrasures in the hull sides and the other six on the upper deck protected by gun shields. For defense against torpedo boats, the ship carried nine quick-firing (QF) 57 mm (2.2 in) Hotchkiss guns and two QF 37 mm (1.5 in) Hotchkiss guns. The ship was also equipped with five 450 mm (17.7 in) torpedo tubes.

The ship was protected by a 100-millimeter (3.9 in) armored belt that only protected the middle of her hull. The upper strake of armor was also 100 mm thick and protected just the middle of the ship, up to the height of the upper deck. The armored deck was 25 mm (0.98 in) thick. The armor of the conning tower and the gun shields were both 50 mm (2.0 in) thick.

== Construction and career ==
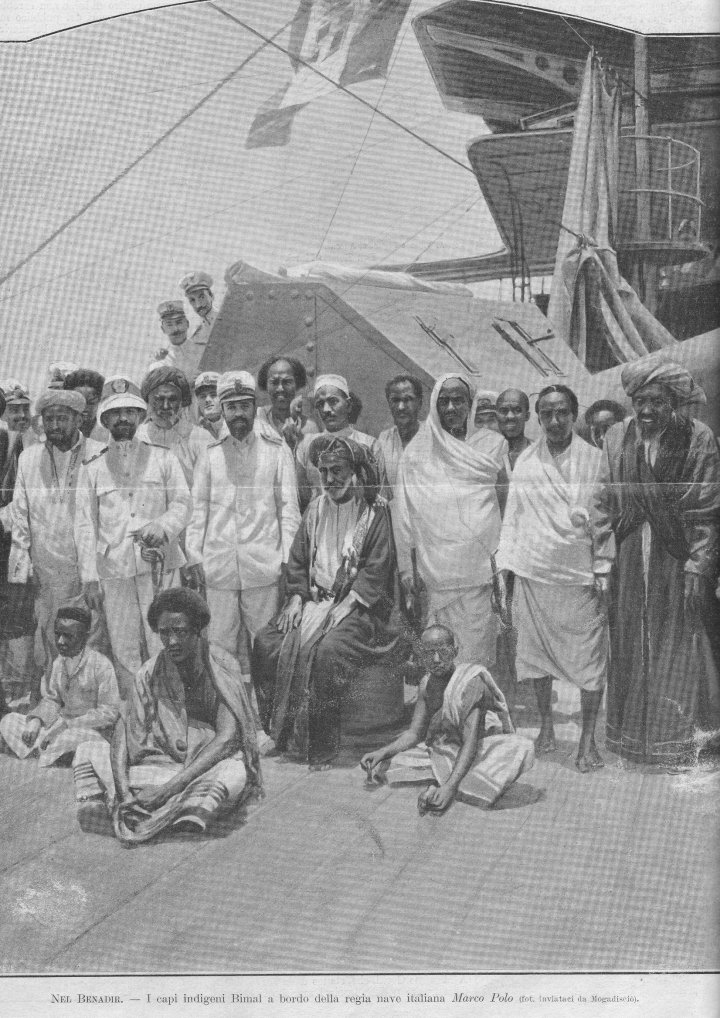
Bimal elders and the Bimal Sultan on board Marco Polo discussing matters with Italian figures

Marco Polo, named after the eponymous explorer, was laid down on 1 July 1890 at the Royal Shipyard in Castellammare di Stabia. The ship was launched on 27 October 1892 and completed on 21 July 1894. She visited Candia (now Heraklion), Crete, and Piraeus, Greece, in May 1897 and Smyrna, Ottoman Empire before departing for the Far East on 26 January 1898. In May 1898, Marco Polo sailed up China′s Yangtze River to make port visits at Nanjing and Hankou before returning to Shanghai in July 1898. She visited Japan from August to November 1898 and then steamed to Shanghai, where she remained until August 1899. On 8 March 1899, while Marco Polo was at Shanghai, the Italian Minister of Foreign Affairs, Vice Admiral Felice Napoleone Canevaro, ordered the protected cruiser Elba and her to occupy China's Sanmen Bay (known as "San-Mun Bay" to the Italians) in a botched attempt to force China to grant Italy a lease there similar to the lease the German Empire had secured in 1898 at Jiaozhou Bay, but countermanded the order when he discovered that the United Kingdom would not support an Italian use of force.

Marco Polo departed Shanghai on 27 August 1899 and arrived in Naples on 20 October 1899. She departed for China in October 1901 and remained there until February 1903. A year later, she began her third tour there in March 1904 and did not leave China until 14 January 1907. En route home the ship visited Zanzibar, Mogadishu, Italian Somaliland, and Massawa, Eritrea before arriving at Taranto on 26 April. Marco Polo was rearmed in 1911 and her armament was reduced to six 152 mm, four 120 mm, six 57 mm, and two 37 mm guns. One torpedo tube was also removed during this refit.

When the Italo-Turkish War of 1911–12 began on 29 September 1911, Marco Polo was assigned to the 2nd Division of the 1st Squadron of the Mediterranean Fleet. She was quickly transferred, however, to the command of Rear-Admiral Prince Luigi Amedeo, Duke of the Abruzzi, Inspector of Torpedo Boats. His command was deployed in the Adriatic Sea and was patrolling the area for Ottoman ships. Marco Polo and two destroyers stopped an Austro-Hungarian ship on 5 October in the bay at San Giovanni di Medua, Albania, and when they sent a boat to board the merchant ship, Ottoman coastal artillery began firing at the boat. The Italian ships returned fire for 45 minutes and silenced the guns after nearly exhausting their ammunition. The incident prompted a diplomatic protest by Austria-Hungary and Italy ceased its operations against the Ottomans in Albania. Marco Polo was then transferred to the 4th Division of the 2nd Squadron, operating off the Libyan coast.

On 17 October, she arrived at Homs to support Italian forces attempting to occupy the town and bombarded it after the Ottoman commander refused to surrender. Bad weather prevented any landings until 21 October and the ship continued to provide fire support for the Italian troops. Marco Polo was tasked to provide fire support for the Royal Italian Army and remained at Homs after the bulk of the fleet returned to Italy to refit in December. In early April 1912, the ship, together with the armored cruiser Carlo Alberto bombarded Zuara as a distraction while the army made an unopposed landing 40 kilometers (25 mi) away. About a week later, she rejoined the 4th Division as it, and the bulk of the Italian fleet, sailed east in a futile search for the Ottoman fleet in the Aegean Sea. Marco Polo joined the rest of the fleet in desultorily bombarding the defenses of the entrance to the Dardanelles on 18 April. The ship then returned to Libya where she resumed her previous task of providing fire support for the army. In June she supported the operation to capture Misrata and finally returned home on 16 July.

Marco Polo departed Taranto on 25 February 1913 for her fourth deployment to the Far East. When World War I began in August 1914, she was in Kobe, Japan and the Italian declaration of neutrality on 2 August simplified the problems faced by the Allies in the Far East. The ship departed Shanghai on 7 December and was diverted to Hodeidah, Yemen, en route and finally reached Naples on 4 March 1915. Thoroughly obsolete by the time Italy declared war on the Central Powers in May 1915, Marco Polo was used as an accommodation ship at Venice; among those personnel housed aboard were the crews of the British submarines operating there from October 1915 through May 1917. The ship began conversion into a troop transport at the Venetian Arsenal in 1917. This required the removal of her armor, the replacement of her armament with some 76 mm (3.0 in) guns and internal modifications to suit her new role. She was recommissioned with the new name of Cortellazo on 4 April 1918. The ship was rechristened Europa on 1 October 1920, discarded on 16 January 1921, but simultaneously rechristened Volta, then discarded on 5 January 1922. She was sold for scrap.
