= Vettor Pisani-class cruiser =

Italian class of cruisers

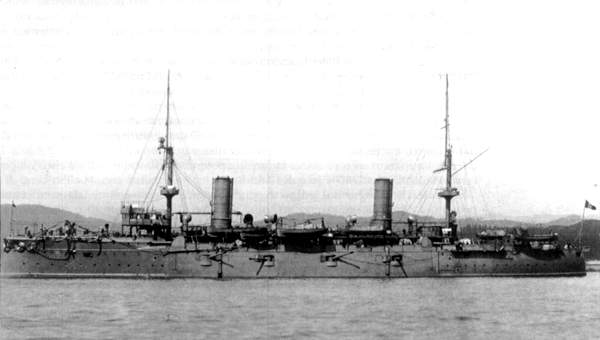
- Carlo Alberto at anchor

Class overview
- Name: Vettor Pisani
- Builders: Arsenale di La Spezia; Regio Cantiere di Castellammare di Stabia
- Operators: Regia Marina
- Preceded by: Marco Polo
- Succeeded by: Giuseppe Garibaldi class
- Built: 1892–99
- In commission: 1898–1920
- Completed: 2
- Scrapped: 2

General characteristics
- Type: Armored cruiser
- Displacement: 6,397–6,614 t (6,296–6,510 long tons)
- Length: 105.7 m (346 ft 9 in) (o/a)
- Beam: 18.04 m (59 ft 2 in)
- Draft: 7.2 m (23 ft 7 in)
- Installed power: 13,000 ihp (9,700 kW); 8 Scotch marine boilers
- Propulsion: 2 shafts, 2 vertical triple-expansion steam engines
- Speed: 18 knots (33 km/h; 21 mph)
- Range: 5,400 nmi (10,000 km; 6,200 mi) at 10 knots (19 km/h; 12 mph)
- Complement: 500–504
- Armament: 12 single 152 mm (6.0 in) guns; 4–6 single 120 mm (4.7 in) guns; 14 single 57 mm (2.2 in) Hotchkiss guns; 6–8 single 37 mm (1.5 in) Hotchkiss guns; 4 × 450 mm (17.7 in) torpedo tubes
- Armor: Belt: 150 mm (6 in); Gun shields: 50 mm (2 in); Deck: 37 mm (1.5 in); Conning tower: 150 mm (6 in)

The Vettor Pisani class consisted of two armoured cruisers built for the Royal Italian Navy (Regia Marina) in the 1890s. The two ships of the class, Vettor Pisani and Carlo Alberto, were frequently deployed overseas during their careers. The former served in the Far East during the Boxer Rebellion of 1900 while the latter was involved in pioneering long-range radio experiments several years later before deploying to South American waters. Carlo Alberto then served as a training ship for several years. Both ships participated in the Italo-Turkish War of 1911–12 and played minor roles in World War I, during which time Carlo Alberto was converted into a troop transport and Vettor Pisani into a repair ship. They were both discarded in 1920 and subsequently scrapped.

== Design and description ==
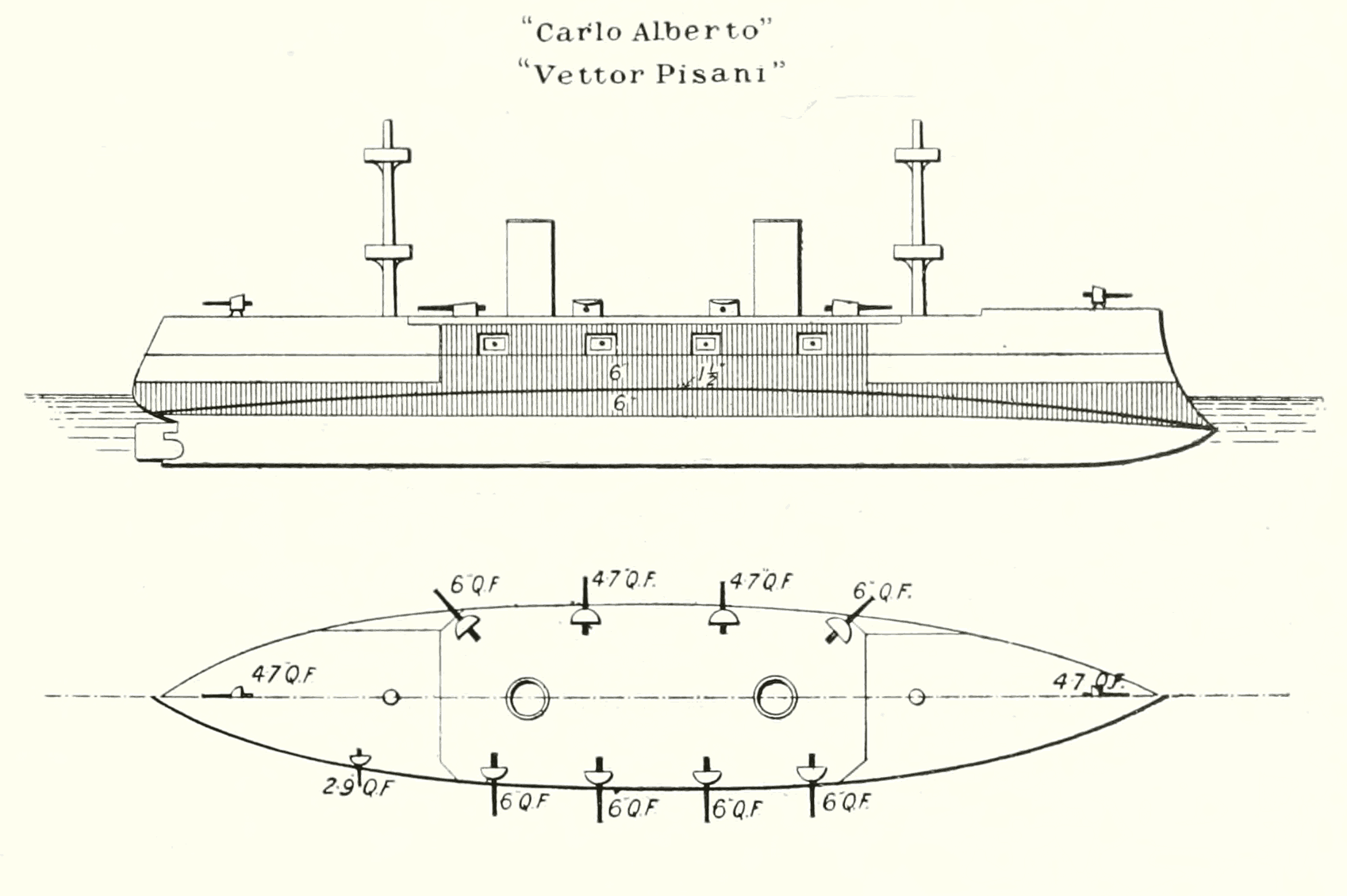
Right elevation and plan drawing of the Vettor Pisani-class armored cruisers from Brassey's Naval Annual 1902

The ships of the class had a length between perpendiculars of 99 meters (324 ft 10 in) and an overall length of 105.7 meters (346 ft 9 in). They had a beam of 18.04 meters (59 ft 2 in) and a draft of 7.2 meters (23 ft 7 in). They displaced 6,397–6,614 metric tons (6,296–6,510 long tons) at normal load, and 7,057–7,128 metric tons (6,946–7,015 long tons) at deep load. The Vettor Pisani class had a complement of 28 officers and 472 to 476 enlisted men.

The ships were powered by two vertical triple-expansion steam engines, each driving one propeller shaft. Steam for the engines was supplied by eight (Note: Gardiner says 4 boilers.) Scotch marine boilers and their exhausts were trunked into a pair of funnels amidships. Designed for a maximum output of 13,000 indicated horsepower (9,700 kW) and a speed of 19 knots (35 km/h; 22 mph), both ships exceeded their designed power during their sea trials although only Carlo Alberto met her designed speed. The two had a cruising radius of about 5,400 nautical miles (10,000 km; 6,200 mi) at a speed of 10 knots (19 km/h; 12 mph).

The main armament of the Vettor Pisani-class ships consisted of twelve quick-firing (QF) Cannone da 152/40 A Modello 1891 guns in single mounts. These 152 mm (6 in) weapons had 40-caliber barrels. All of these guns were mounted on the broadside, eight on the upper deck and four at the corners of the central citadel in armored casemates. The M1891 guns weighed 6.6 metric tons (6.5 long tons) and fired a 45.4-kilogram (100 lb), armor-piercing, capped shell at a muzzle velocity of 700 m/s (2,297 ft/s).

Single 40-caliber QF Cannone da 120/40 A Modello 1891 guns were mounted at the bow and stern and the remaining two or four 120 mm (4.7 in) guns were positioned on the main deck between the 152 mm guns. The 20.4-kilogram (45 lb) armor-piercing shell had a muzzle velocity of 645 m/s (2,116 ft/s) when fired by these guns. For defense against torpedo boats, the ships carried fourteen QF 57 mm (2.2 in) Hotchkiss guns and six or eight QF 37 mm (1.5 in) Hotchkiss guns. They were also equipped with four 450 mm (17.7 in) torpedo tubes.

The ships were protected by an armored belt that was 15 cm (5.9 in) thick amidships and reduced to 11 cm (4.3 in) at the bow and stern. The upper strake of armor was also 15 cm thick and protected just the middle of the ship, up to the height of the upper deck. The curved armored deck was 3.7 cm thick. The conning tower armor was also 15 cm thick and each 15.2 cm gun was protected by a 5 cm (2.0 in) gun shield.

== Ships ==
Construction data
Name	Builder	Laid down	Launched	Completed	Fate
Vettor Pisani	Regio Cantieri di Castellammare di Stabia, Castellammare di Stabia	1 February 1892	23 September 1896	1 May 1898	Discarded, 12 June 1920
Carlo Alberto	Arsenale di La Spezia, La Spezia	7 December 1892	14 August 1895	1 April 1899	Discarded, 2 January 1920

== Service ==
Vettor Pisani was the flagship of Rear Admiral Candiani, commander of the Cruising Squadron dispatched to China in 1900 during the Boxer Rebellion. She arrived at La Spezia in early 1902, but only remained in Italian waters for a year before returning to the Far East for another year-long cruise.

Carlo Alberto acted as the royal yacht for King Victor Emmanuel III when he attended the coronation ceremony for King Edward VII of the United Kingdom in 1902. Victor Emmanuel invited Guglielmo Marconi to accompany him and conduct radio experiments en route. When the coronation was delayed by Edward's illness, the ship took Victor Emmanuel to meetings with Tsar Nicholas II of Russia in Kronstadt. She then ferried Marconi across the Atlantic to Nova Scotia for experiments transmitting radio messages across the ocean. After 15 December, when Marconi successfully transmitted messages from Canada to England, Carlo Alberto was sent to Venezuelan waters during the Venezuelan crisis of 1902–03, when an international force of British, German, and Italian warships blockaded Venezuela over the country's refusal to pay foreign debts. From 1907 to 1910 she served as a gunnery and torpedo training ship.

Both ships participated in the Italo-Turkish War of 1911–12. Vettor Pisani supported operations in the Adriatic and Aegean Seas and in the Dardanelles while Carlo Alberto took part in the assaults on Tripoli and Zuara and thereafter provided gunfire support to Italian forces in North Africa.

Obsolescent by the beginning of World War I, neither ship was very active during the war. Vettor Pisani spent the war in the Adriatic and participated in an abortive attempt in mid-1915 to bombard a rail line near Ragusa Vecchia on the Dalmatian coast. An Austro-Hungarian submarine, U-4, intercepted the Italian ships and sank the armored cruiser Giuseppe Garibaldi. Vettor Pisani subsequently became a repair ship in 1916 and was stricken from the Navy List on 2 January 1920. She was sold for scrap and broken up beginning on 13 March.

Carlo Alberto spent the almost the entire war based in Venice. She began conversion into a troop transport there in 1917 and the work was finished in Taranto early the next year; she was recommissioned with the new name of Zenson. The ship was discarded on 12 June 1920 and subsequently scrapped.
