= Italian cruiser Vettor Pisani =

Italian lead ship of Vettor Pisani-class

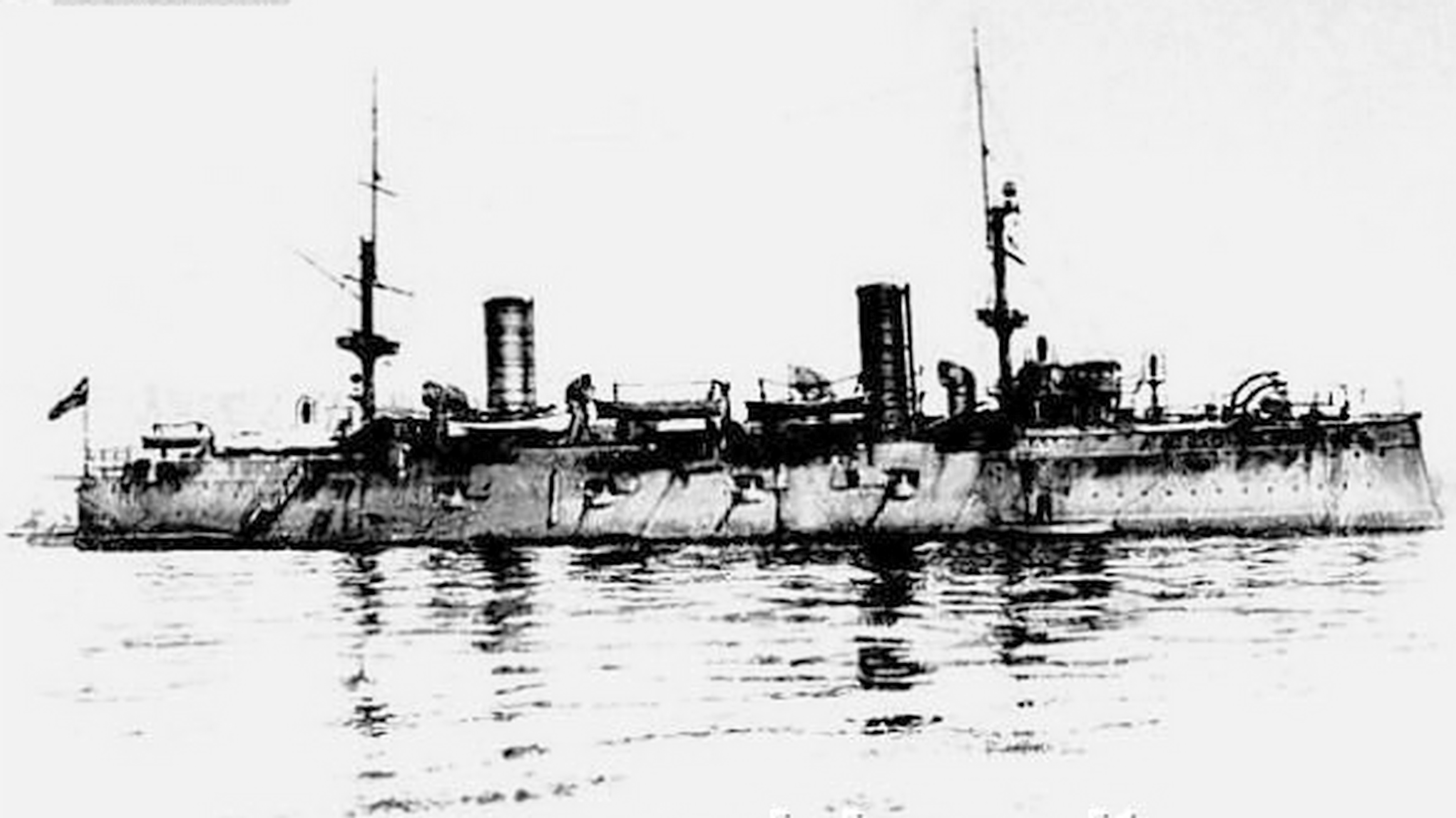
- Vettor Pisani at anchor

History

Kingdom of Italy
- Name: Vettor Pisani
- Namesake: Vettor Pisani
- Builder: Regio Cantieri di Castellammare di Stabia
- Laid down: 7 December 1892
- Launched: 14 August 1895
- Completed: 1 April 1899
- Stricken: 2 January 1920
- Fate: Sold for scrap, 1920

General characteristics
- Type: Vettor Pisani-class armored cruiser
- Displacement: 6,614 t (6,510 long tons)
- Length: 105.7 m (346 ft 9 in) (o/a)
- Beam: 18.04 m (59 ft 2 in)
- Draft: 7.2 m (23 ft 7 in)
- Installed power: 13,000 ihp (9,700 kW); 8 Scotch marine boilers
- Propulsion: 2 shafts, 2 vertical triple-expansion steam engines
- Speed: 18 knots (33 km/h; 21 mph)
- Range: 5,400 nmi (10,000 km; 6,200 mi) at 10 knots (19 km/h; 12 mph)
- Complement: 500–504
- Armament: 12 single 152 mm (6.0 in) guns; 4 single 120 mm (4.7 in) guns; 14 single 57 mm (2.2 in) Hotchkiss guns; 8 single 37 mm (1.5 in) Hotchkiss guns; 4 × 450 mm (17.7 in) torpedo tubes
- Armor: Belt: 6 in (150 mm); Gun shields: 51 mm (2 in); Deck: 38 mm (1.5 in); Conning tower: 150 mm (6 in)

The Italian cruiser Vettor Pisani was the name ship of her class of two armored cruisers built for the Royal Italian Navy (Regia Marina) in the 1890s. She often served as a flagship during her career and frequently served overseas. On one of these deployments, the ship received a radio message from Peking, one of the first long-range radio transmissions to a ship. Vettor Pisani participated in the Boxer Rebellion of 1900 and the Italo-Turkish War of 1911–12, during which her admiral nearly caused a diplomatic incident with the Austro-Hungarian Empire. During World War I, her activities were limited by the threat of Austro-Hungarian submarines and she was converted into a repair ship in 1916. Vettor Pisani was stricken from the Navy List in 1920 and scrapped later that year.

== Design and description ==
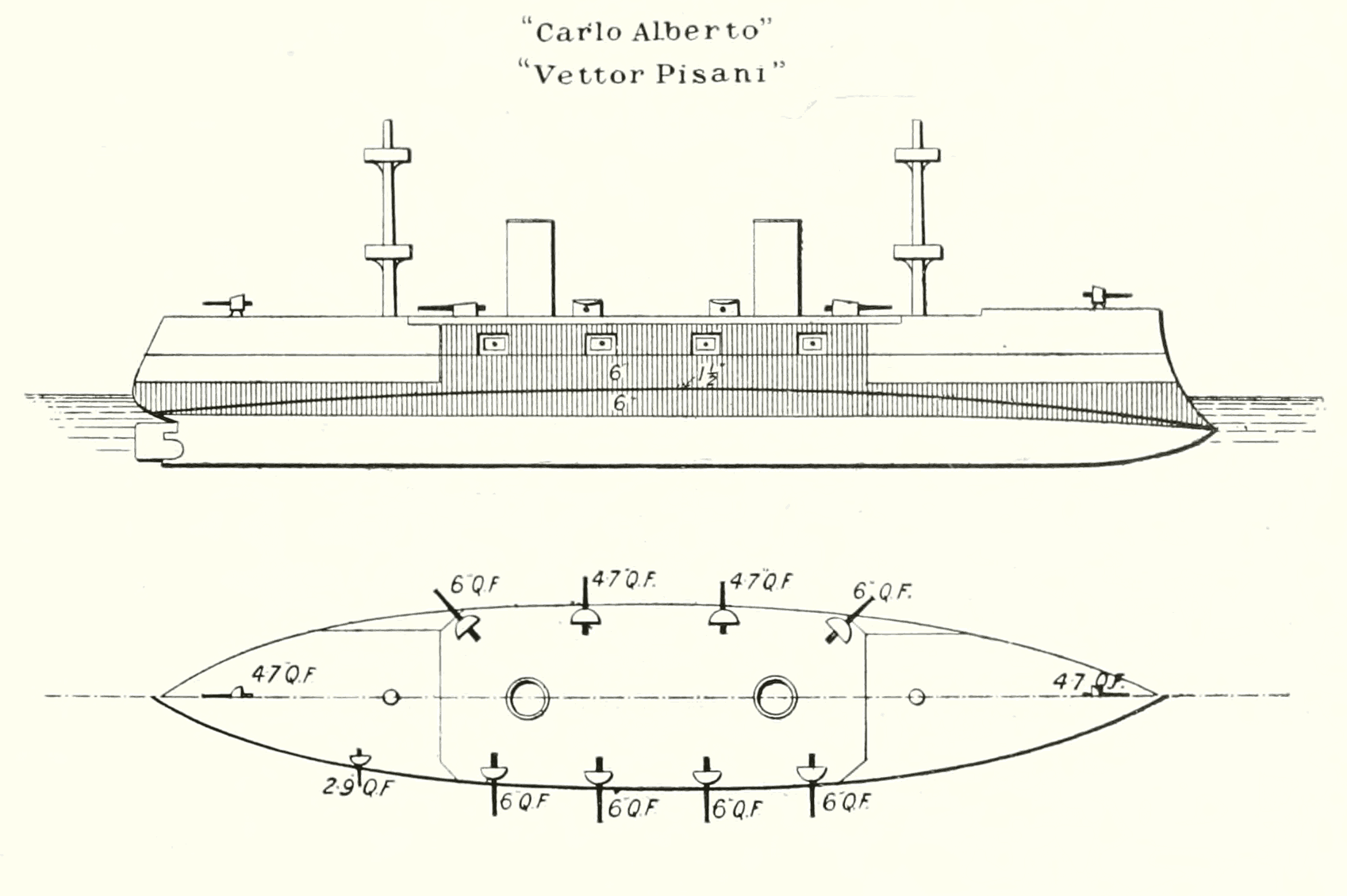
Right elevation and plan drawing of the Vettor Pisani-class armored cruisers from Brassey's Naval Annual 1902

Vettor Pisani had a length between perpendiculars of 99 meters (324 ft 10 in) and an overall length of 105.7 meters (346 ft 9 in). She had a beam of 18.04 meters (59 ft 2 in) and a draft of 7.2 meters (23 ft 7 in). The ship displaced 6,614 metric tons (6,510 long tons) at normal load, and 7,128 metric tons (7,015 long tons) at deep load. The Vettor Pisani-class ships had a complement of 28 officers and 472 to 476 enlisted men.

The ship was powered by two vertical triple-expansion steam engines, each driving one propeller shaft. Steam for the engines was supplied by eight (Note: Gardiner says four boilers.) Scotch marine boilers. Designed for a maximum output of 13,000 indicated horsepower (9,700 kW) and a speed of 19 knots (35 km/h; 22 mph), Vettor Pisani only reached a speed of 18.6 knots (34.4 km/h; 21.4 mph) during her sea trials despite slightly exceeding her designed horsepower with 13,259 ihp (9,887 kW). She had a cruising radius of about 5,400 nautical miles (10,000 km; 6,200 mi) at a speed of 10 knots (19 km/h; 12 mph).

The main armament of the Vettor Pisani-class ships consisted of twelve quick-firing (QF) Cannone da 152/40 A Modello 1891 guns in single mounts. All of these guns were mounted on the broadside, eight on the upper deck and four at the corners of the central citadel in armored casemates. Single QF Cannone da 120/40 A Modello 1891 guns were mounted in the bow and stern and the remaining two 120 mm (4.7 in) guns were positioned on the main deck between the 152 mm (6.0 in) guns. For defense against torpedo boats, the ship carried fourteen QF 57 mm (2.2 in) Hotchkiss guns and eight QF 37 mm (1.5 in) Hotchkiss guns. The ship was also equipped with four 450 mm (17.7 in) torpedo tubes.

Vettor Pisani was protected by an armored belt that was 15 cm (5.9 in) thick amidships and reduced to 11 cm (4.3 in) at the bow and stern. The upper strake of armor was also 15 cm thick and protected just the middle of the ship, up to the height of the upper deck. The curved armored deck was 3.7 cm thick. The conning tower armor was also 15 cm thick and each 15.2 cm gun was protected by a 5 cm (2.0 in) gun shield.

== Construction and career ==
Vettor Pisani, named after the eponymous Venetian admiral, was laid down on 7 December 1892 at the Royal Shipyard in Castellammare di Stabia. The ship was launched on 14 August 1895 and completed on 1 April 1899. She was the flagship of Rear Admiral Candiani, commander of the Cruising Squadron dispatched to China in 1900 during the Boxer Rebellion. Vettor Pisani arrived there on 20 August and made port visits in Japan, Korea and Vladivostok before departing the area on 29 November 1901. She arrived at La Spezia in February 1902, but only remained in Italian waters for a year before departing for another year-long cruise to the Far East on 15 April 1903. On 14 October, the Italian Legation in Peking successfully radioed the ship off the coast of China, one of the first long-range radio transmissions to a ship. The cruiser arrived back in Italy on 13 June 1904. Nothing is known of her activities until May – June 1908 when Vettor Pisani made a short cruise in Greek waters.

When the Italo-Turkish War of 1911–12 began on 29 September 1911, Vettor Pisani was the flagship of Rear-Admiral Prince Luigi Amedeo, Duke of the Abruzzi, Inspector of Torpedo Boats. His command, the Division of the Inspector of Torpedo Boats, was deployed in the Adriatic Sea and five of his destroyers encountered two Ottoman torpedo boats in the Ionian Sea only an hour after war was declared. One of the Ottoman ships was able to take shelter under the protection of the fortifications in Prevesa while the other was forced to beach itself with nine men killed by Italian gunfire. The Italians blockaded the port and the Duke requested permission to issue an ultimatum for the Ottoman authorities to surrender the ship lest he bombard the city with Vettor Pisani and the battleship Ammiraglio di Saint Bon. Protests in early October over Italian interference in Ottoman-controlled Albania by the Austro-Hungarian Empire forced the Italians to abandon operations there and permission was denied. The cruiser was based in Taranto and Brindisi for much of December.

In mid-April 1912, the division escorted the 1st, 2nd and 4th Divisions of the Italian fleet from Taranto to the eastern Aegean Sea where it bombarded the fortifications defending the Dardanelles to little effect before the main body departed for Italy on the 19th. Several months later, Vettor Pisani supported an unsuccessful sortie by five torpedo boats into the Dardanelles in search of the Ottoman fleet on the night of 18/19 July.

Obsolescent by the beginning of World War I, Vettor Pisani was not very active during the war. She spent the war in the Adriatic and participated in an abortive attempt in mid-1915 to bombard a rail line near Ragusa Vecchia on the Dalmatian coast. An Austro-Hungarian submarine, U-4, intercepted the Italian ships and sank the armored cruiser Giuseppe Garibaldi. The loss of Giuseppe Garibaldi and the sinking of the armored cruiser Amalfi by another submarine on 7 July severely restricted the activities of the other ships based at Venice. She subsequently became a repair ship in 1916 and was stricken from the Navy List on 2 January 1920. Vettor Pisani was sold for scrap and broken up beginning on 13 March.
