= Renato De Martino =

General-Consol and Ambassador

Personal details
- Born: 15 July 1843 Tangiers, Morocco
- Died: 1 April 1903 (aged 59) Pisa, Kingdom of Italy

Military service
- Allegiance: Kingdom of the Two Sicilies; Papal States; Dictatorship of Giuseppe Garibaldi; Kingdom of Italy

Renato De Martino (Tangier, 15 July 1843 – Pisa, 1 April 1903) was an Italian diplomat and ambassador.

He was the ambassador of the Kingdom of Italy in the Qing Dynasty between 1898 and 1899 after his service in the Republic of the United States of Brazil and the Empire of Japan. He was the son of S.E. Giacomo Ambrogio De Martino, an ambassador and the last Minister of Foreign Affairs of the Kingdom of the Two Sicilies.

== Career ==
After an exam, he was nominated as a "diplomat alumni" in the Ministry of Foreign Affairs of Naples on 18 August 1858, following the career path of his father. He was also given this status in Rome on 21 September 1860 during the period of the Papal States. He was appointed deputy legation officer on May 1, 1860. On August 16, 1860, he was assigned as secretary of legation to Turin under the Kingdom of Piedmont-Sardinia. He was placed at the disposal of the Dictatorship of Giuseppe Garibaldi on October 11, 1860.

He was confirmed as secretary of legation by the Kingdom of Italy's government and kept on leave on 14 April 1861. Recalled to active service with the rank of 2nd class secretary of legation, he was assigned to the Italian legation in the Kingdom of Sweden-Norway and the Kingdom of Denmark on 23 May 1861. He was transferred to Bern, Switzerland, on 19 June 1866 and subsequently to Madrid, Kingdom of Spain, on 4 July 1869. Transferred to London, United Kingdom, on 7 March 1874, he was appointed counsellor of legation on 16 March 1876. Placed at the disposal of the Ministry from 14 August 1878. He was assigned to Stockholm once again on 5 December 1878 and placed again at the disposal of the Ministry on 5 August 1879.

He was sent to Sofia, in the Principality of Bulgaria , as an agent for the Italian state and as a general consul on 9 February 1880. He'd stay there until 1884.

He was sent to Tokyo, in the Empire of Japan, with the rank of extraordinary envoy and plenipotentiary minister on 31 December 1883. Promoted to extraordinary envoy and plenipotentiary minister of 2nd class on 29 March 1888, he was then sent in Rio de Janeiro, 4 October 1894.

He was sent to Beijing on March 6, 1898, where he was involved in the unsuccessful negotiations for the concession of San Mun.

His career came to an end on 1 April 1902, when he resigned.

== San Mun affair ==
The San Mun affair of 1899 was an attempt by the Italian government to gain a sphere of influence in China. After Germany concluded a 50-year lease agreement with China for Kiautschou Bay, Italy also decided to set foot on Chinese soil, requesting the lease of a coal station in San Mun Bay.

The whole affair was managed by the foreign minister Felice Napoleone Canevaro, an experienced admiral of the Navy but completely incompetent in politics and this did not allow De Martino to manage the Italian position with the necessary coherence and effectiveness.

== See also ==
- Ministry of Foreign Affairs (Italy)

== Bibliography ==
General

- Baldi, Stefano (2020). Ambasciatori d'Italia a Sofia (PDF).
- Quartararo. 1997. ISSN 0391-6731.

Specific
