= Emilio Visconti Venosta =

Italian statesman (1829–1914)

The Illustrious The Marquis of Visconti-Venosta SOMHA
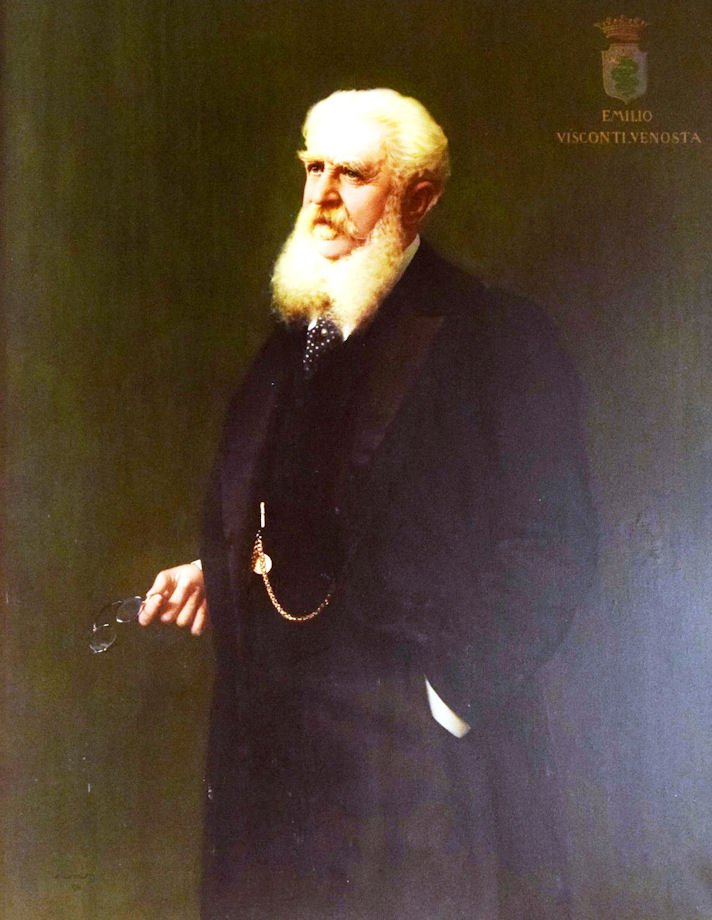

Minister of Foreign Affairs
- In office 11 May 1899 – 15 February 1901
- Prime Minister: Luigi Pelloux; Giuseppe Saracco
- Preceded by: Felice Napoleone Canevaro
- Succeeded by: Giulio Prinetti
- In office 11 July 1896 – 1 June 1898
- Prime Minister: Antonio Starabba di Rudinì
- Preceded by: Onorato Caetani
- Succeeded by: Raffaele Cappelli
- In office 14 December 1869 – 20 November 1876
- Prime Minister: Giovanni Lanza; Marco Minghetti
- Preceded by: Luigi Federico Menabrea
- Succeeded by: Luigi Amedeo Melegari
- In office 28 June 1866 – 10 April 1867
- Prime Minister: Bettino Ricasoli
- Preceded by: Bettino Ricasoli
- Succeeded by: Federico Pescetto
- In office 24 March 1863 – 28 September 1864
- Prime Minister: Marco Minghetti
- Preceded by: Giuseppe Pasolini
- Succeeded by: Alfonso Ferrero La Marmora

Personal details
- Born: 22 January 1829 Milan, Kingdom of Lombardy–Venetia
- Died: 24 November 1914 (aged 85) Rome, Kingdom of Italy
- Party: Historical Right

Emilio, marquis Visconti-Venosta (22 January 1829 – 24 November 1914) was an Italian statesman. He is one of the longest-serving Ministers of Foreign Affairs in the history of Italy.

== Biography ==
Visconti-Venosta was born in Milan, in the Kingdom of Lombardy–Venetia. He studied jurisprudence at the University of Pavia.

A disciple of Mazzini, he took part in all the anti-Austrian conspiracies until the ineffectual rising at Milan on 6 February 1853, of which he had foretold the failure, induced him to renounce his Mazzinian allegiance. Continuing, nevertheless, his anti-Austrian propaganda, he rendered good service to the national cause, but being molested by the Austrian police, was obliged in 1859 to escape to Turin, and during the war with Austria of that year was appointed by Cavour royal commissioner with the Garibaldian forces.

Elected deputy in 1860, he accompanied Luigi Carlo Farini on diplomatic missions to Modena and Naples, and was subsequently despatched to London and Paris to acquaint the British and French governments with the course of events in Italy. As a recompense for the tact displayed on this occasion, he was given by Cavour a permanent appointment in the Italian foreign office, and was subsequently appointed under-secretary of state by Count Pasolini. Upon the latter's death he became Minister of Foreign Affairs (March 24, 1863) in the Minghetti cabinet, in which capacity he negotiated the September Convention for the evacuation of Rome by the French troops.

Resigning office with Minghetti in the autumn of 1864, he was in March 1866 sent by la Marmora as minister to Constantinople, but was almost immediately recalled and reappointed foreign minister by Ricasoli. Assuming office on the morrow of the Italian defeat at Custoza, he succeeded in preventing Austria from burdening Italy with a proportion of the Austrian imperial debt, in addition to the Venetian debt proper. The fall of Ricasoli in February 1867 deprived him for a time of his office, but in December 1869 he entered the Lanza-Sella cabinet as foreign minister, and retained his portfolio in the succeeding Minghetti cabinet until the fall of the Right in 1876.

During this long period he was called upon to conduct the delicate negotiations connected with the Franco-Prussian War, the Capture of Rome by the Italians, and the consequent destruction of the temporal power of the Pope, the Law of Guarantees and the visits of Victor Emmanuel II to Vienna and Berlin. Upon the occasion of his marriage with the daughter of the Marquis Alfieri di Sostegno, grand-niece of Cavour, he was created marquis by the king. For a time he remained a member of the parliamentary opposition, and in 1886 was nominated senator.

In 1894, after eighteen years' absence from active political life, he was chosen to be Italian arbitrator in the Bering Sea question, and in 1896 once more accepted the portfolio of foreign affairs in the Di Rudinì cabinet at a juncture when the disastrous First Italo-Ethiopian War and the indiscreet publication of an Abyssinian Green Book had rendered the international position of Italy exceedingly difficult. His first care was to improve Franco-Italian relations by negotiating with France a treaty with regard to Tunis. During the negotiations relating to the Cretan question and the Graeco-Turkish War he secured for Italy a worthy part in the European Concert and joined Lord Salisbury in saving Greece from the loss of Thessaly.

Resigning office in May 1898, on a question of internal policy, he once more retired to private life.

In May 1899 he again assumed the management of foreign affairs in the second Pelloux cabinet, and continued to hold office in the succeeding Saracco cabinet until its fall in February 1901. During this period his attention was devoted chiefly to the Boxer Rebellion and to the maintenance of the equilibrium in the Mediterranean and the Adriatic. In regard to the Mediterranean he established an Italo-French agreement by which France tacitly undertook to leave Italy a free hand in Tripoli, and Italy not to interfere with French policy in the interior of Morocco; and, in regard to the Adriatic, he came to an understanding with Austria-Hungary guaranteeing the status quo in Albania.

Prudence (dubbed as "clean hands policy") (Note: On the other side, the "clean hands" policy in diplomacy was judged, in next century, "a dramatic cultural heritage, which Italy should escape now more than ever": Buonomo, Giampiero (2013). "Elezioni europee e nuovo trattato di Lisbona". L'Ago e Il Filo Edizione Online. Archived from the original on 1 August 2012 – via Questia.) and sagacity, coupled with unequalled experience of foreign policy, enabled him to assure to Italy her full portion of influence in international affairs, and secured for himself the unanimous esteem of European cabinets. In recognition of his services he was created Knight of the Annunziata by Victor Emmanuel III on the occasion of the birth of Princess Yolanda of Savoy (June 1, 1901).

In February 1906 he was Italian delegate to the Algeciras Conference. The purpose of the conference was to mediate the First Moroccan Crisis between France and Germany, and to assure the repayment of a large loan made to the Sultan in 1904. After this conference, Visconti-Venosta retired from public life. On account of his great experience, profound legal and political culture and sound judgment, he was often consulted by the Italian government, especially on questions of foreign affairs. He explicitly approved of Italy's declaration of neutrality on the outbreak of World War I. He died in Rome on 24 November 1914.

== Sources ==
Political offices
| Preceded by Giovanni Pasolini | Italian Minister of Foreign Affairs; 1863–1864 | Succeeded by Alfonso Ferrero La Marmora |
| Preceded by Alfonso Ferrero La Marmora | Italian Minister of Foreign Affairs; 1866–1867 | Succeeded by Pompeo Di Campello |
| Preceded by Luigi Federico, conte Menabrea | Italian Minister of Foreign Affairs; 1869–1876 | Succeeded by Luigi Amedeo Melegari |
| Preceded by Onorato Caetani | Italian Minister of Foreign Affairs; 1896–1898 | Succeeded by Raffaele Cappelli |
| Preceded by Felice Napoleone Canevaro | Italian Minister of Foreign Affairs; 1899–1901 | Succeeded by Giulio Prinetti |
