= Rock Davis =

Australian shipbuilder

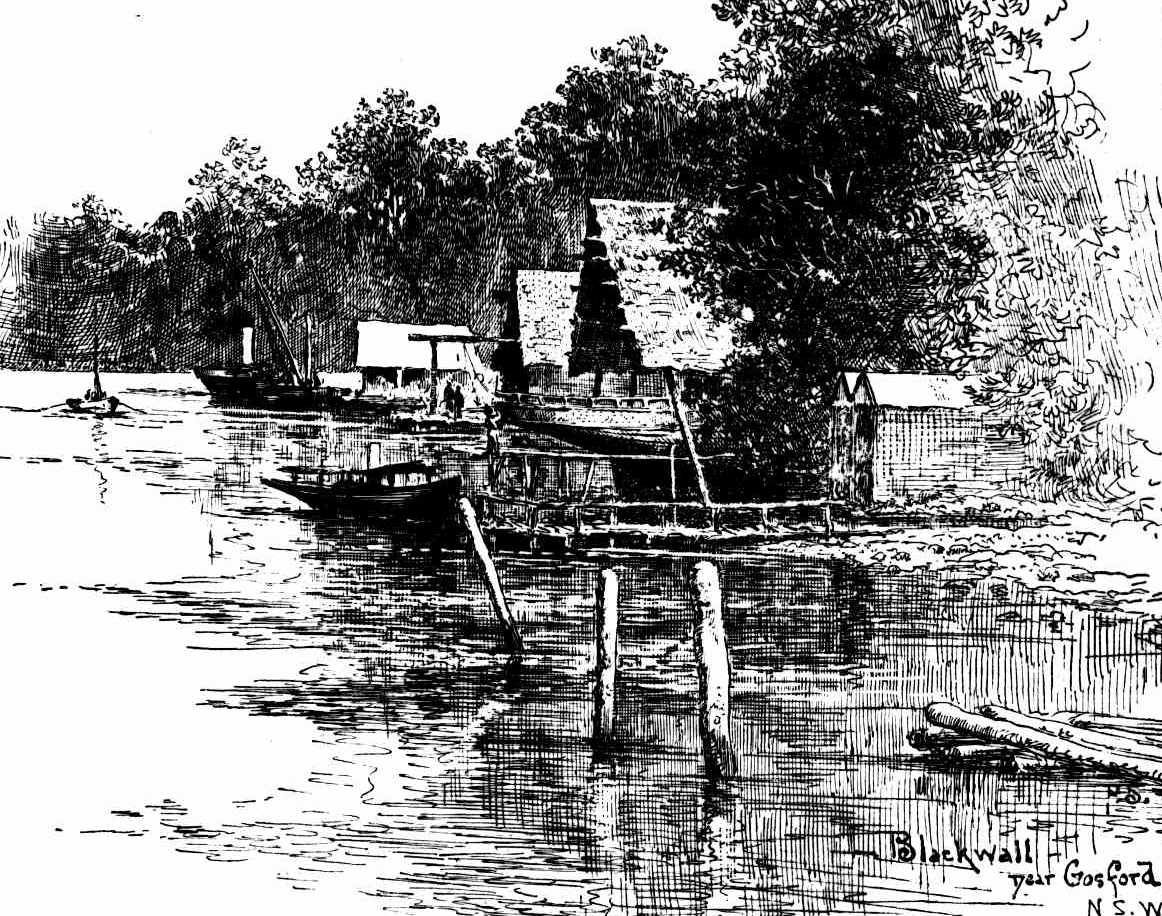
Rock Davis shipyard, Blackwall, c.1889

Rock Davis (1833–1904) was a shipbuilder, mainly associated with his shipyard, the Rock Davis shipyard, colloquially known as "the Big Shed", on Brisbane Water at Blackwall, New South Wales, Australia. After his death, the business of ship building was carried on by his second son, also Rock Davis. The shipyard constructed around 165 wooden-hulled vessels, between 1862 and 1913.

== Family background and early life ==
Rock Davis was born at sea—aboard the ship Mary Catherine on which the Davis family were migrating to New South Wales—on 2 July 1833. His parents were William Davis (1791–1846) and his second wife Sarah, née Mayer (1798–1845). His unusual first name is said to have been either after the Rock of Gibraltar—the ship was said to be near there at the time of his birth—or after the captain of Mary Catherine, Benjamin Rock Jones. William Davis was a school teacher, and he and his Irish family had no background as shipwrights.

At the time of his birth, Rock Davis had two elder sisters—Elizabeth (1828–1866) and Mary Ann (1830–1850)—and four surviving elder brothers—George (1821–1860), John (1823–1840), Benjamin (1826–1883), and Thomas (1832–1893). He also had two surviving half-siblings from his father's first marriage to Isobel, née Milsop (1790–1819), Sarah (1817–1902) and William (1819–1858). All arrived in the colony in October 1833. His parents later had another son, Edward (1837–1908).

The Davis family settled on the eastern side of Brisbane Water, and William became the first schoolmaster at the then small settlement of Kincumber. After moderate success, mining gold at Beechworth, Rock joined his brothers, Benjamin, Thomas, and Edward, as apprentice shipwrights, in the yard of Jonathan Piper (1810–1879), at what is now Yattalunga. Piper was one of the first of the shipwrights to build wooden-hulled vessels in the Brisbane Water area. The area had plentiful sheltered tidal foreshore, not far from the open sea at Broken Bay, and nearby sources of hardwood timber and stands of sub-tropical rainforest. Brisbane Water was well-suited to the construction of wooden-hulled vessels, and over 500 would be built there, between 1829 and 1953.

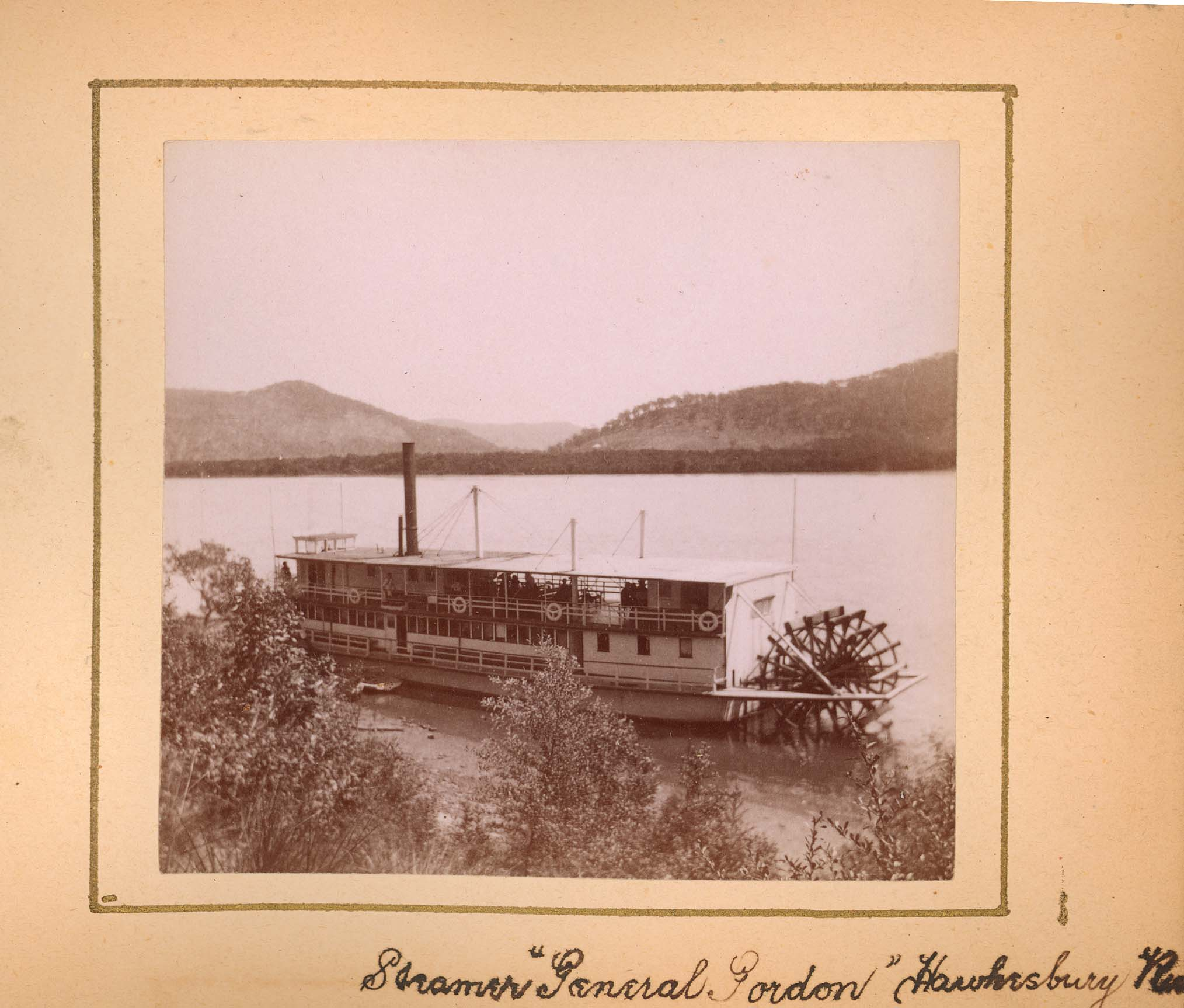
General Gordon, built by Thomas Davis, on the Hawkesbury River

Davistown is named after the Davis family. It is where the various family shipbuilding businesses had their origin, and where Rock Davis's elder brother George Davis and his wife Jane were for many years storekeepers and butchers. Rock and two other Davis shipwright brothers built their first vessel, together, around 1854. In 1858, Rock set up in business for himself, building wooden-hulled vessels.

Thomas Davis later had a shipyard, at Terrigal Haven, in the lee of Broken Head. The first ship he built there was a brig, Amy, in 1872. His yard built the stern-wheel paddle steamer, General Gordon. She was built for the tourist trade, but is most remembered as the ferry that connected the two railways on either side of the Hawkesbury River, before and during the construction of the first Hawkesbury River railway bridge. Benjamin Davis had a shipyard at Bensville, which is named after him. Edward (Ned) Davis eventually left the Brisbane Water area, and set up a sawmilling and shipbuilding business, on the Nambucca River, near Nambucca Heads, on the Mid North Coast. Between them, the four Davis brothers and their families operated a total of eight shipyards and made over 300 wooden vessels up to 1913.

== Rock Davis shipyard ==
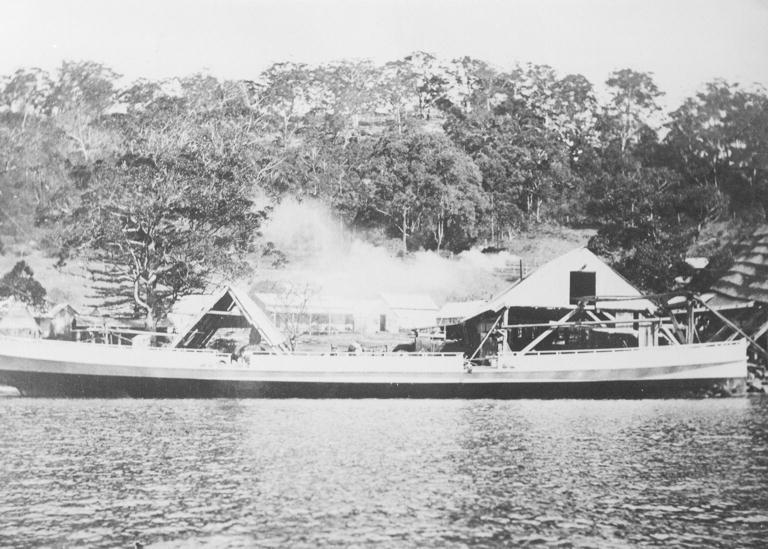
Hull of the ferry, Vaucluse, at the shipyard (c.1905). Part of "the Big Shed" can be seen on the extreme right.

Initially, Rock Davis's shipbuilding business was on Cockle Channel (sometimes known as Cockle Creek) at Davistown.

Davis moved his operations to thirteen acres of foreshore land, on the western side of Brisbane Water, in 1862. It was he who first named the area Blackwall, after Blackwall, London, which was also a centre of shipbuilding.

This new site was alongside deeper water and closer to the main channel and the entrance to Brisbane Water, and it was easier for timber to be transported, over water or by sea, and landed at the shipyard. It would later benefit from its proximity to the new Main Northern railway line. However, in 1862, Blackwall was sparsely populated and the only practical access to the area was by water, both would not change until the arrival of the railway. Into the early, 1880s, the area around Davis's shipyard and house was the only significant place of settlement in the southern part of the western shore of Brisbane Water.

The yard had a sawmill to mill local hardwood timber for use in shipbuilding. To allow work to proceed in all weather, in 1864, Davis erected a large shelter, known as "the Big Shed", which was a distinctive landmark in the area, until its demolition in 1923.

On the northern end of the shipyard was Davis's large house, constructed of brick and with a slate-tiled roof, very different to the other rustic dwellings in the area. Lying to the south of the shipyard was Davis's extensive vegetable and fruit garden, which was tended by a man of Japanese ethnicity, Harry Kowarta.

Vessels made by Rock Davis achieved a high reputation and the shipyard was busy; in 1878, six vessels were launched there in eleven months, and it was described as a "thriving township". In 1868, the yard had employed around a dozen men. However, it soon became the largest of the yards on Brisbane Water, with Davis employing around 100 men in total, and his businesses were a mainstay of the local economy.

The yard only built vessels with wooden hulls. Any steamships would be fitted with engines and any other machinery elsewhere, usually in Sydney. Hulls were typically clad in copper and fitted with decking, typically of imported timber such as kauri, and superstructures, at the yard.

== The vessels ==
The first vessel built in the yard at Blackwall was Centurion in 1863.

=== Sailing vessels ===
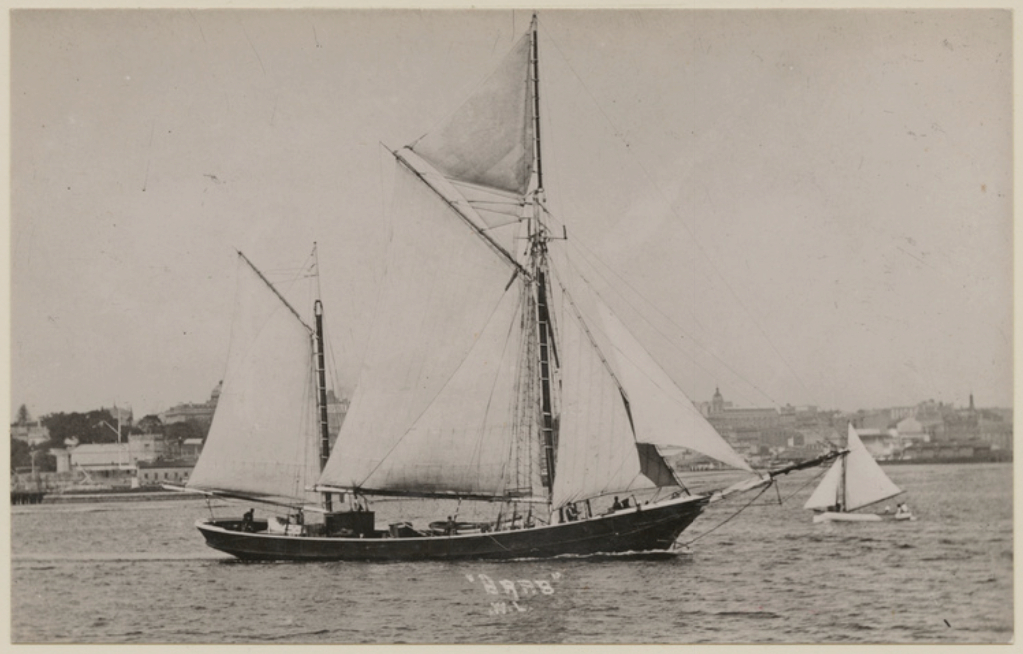
Arab, c.1900

The yard built numerous sailing vessels, mainly ketches and schooners, but also some cutter-rigged boats.

Ketches built at the yard included Champion (1880), Greyhound (1885, later converted to a steamer), Lokohu (1893), Ben Bolt (1895), Zeoma (1896), Arab (1898), and Wave (1902).

Topsail schooners built at the yard included Undaunted (1865), Enterprise (1866), Isabel (1891), Amelia Sims (1901).

Fore-and-aft rig schooners built at the yard included Eva (1857), the three-masted Neptune (1875), Susie (1878), Tivo (1894), Nukamanu (1897), Joseph Sims (1898), Three Friends (1903), and Goodwill (1906).

In the later years, some sailing vessels, built in the yard, also had auxiliary engines, fuelled by oil.

=== Steamers ===
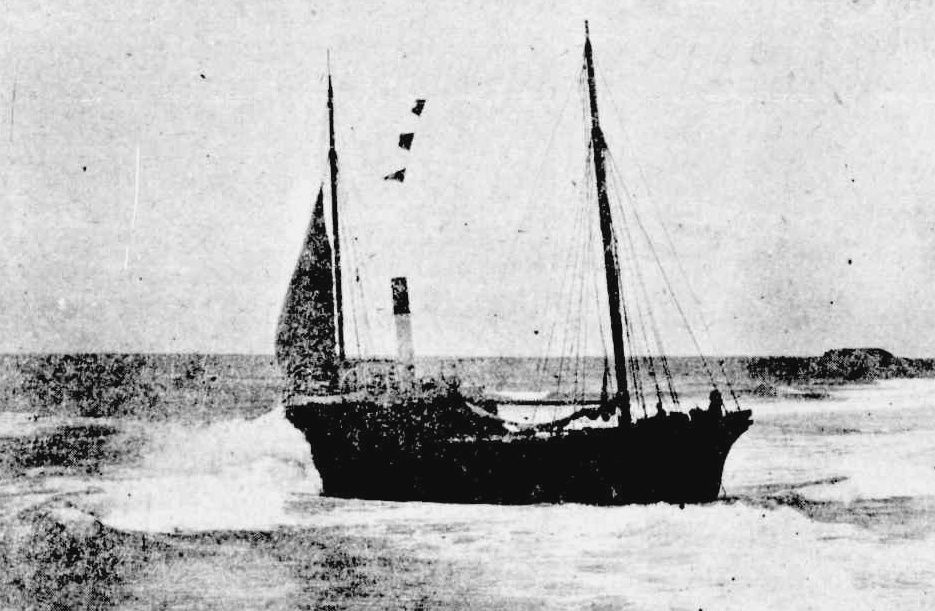
Friendship (1897) aground at Tweed Heads in 1912

==== Auxiliary steamers ====
Some of the steamships built at the yard were auxiliary steamships, with two tall masts described as "fore and aft schooner rigged". Whether or not they normally carried sails in service is uncertain. The tall masts also allowed suspended planks, gaffs, winches, derricks, etc. to be erected for unloading at small ports. Such vessels included Dairymaid (1876), Mikado (1889), and Friendship (1897).

==== Ferries ====
===== Sydney Harbour ferries =====
The yard built steam ferries for Sydney Harbour ferry companies, including Barranjuee (1872), Coomba (1872), Aleathea (1881), Defiance (1881), Possum (1884), Vaucluse (1905), and Lady Chelmsford (1910). The last vessel to be delivered by the yard was the steam ferry, Woollahra, in 1913.

Vaucluse (1905), Lady Chelmsford (1910), and Woollahra (1913) were built to the designs of the innovative naval architect, Walter Reeks (1861–1925).

The yard also built the paddle-wheeler "horse ferry", Bungaree (1873), an early vehicular ferry, which crossed the harbour from Circular Quay to the North Shore. The ill-fated ferry, Greycliffe (1911) was sometimes erroneously attributed to the Rock Davis yard, which later made her companion ferry, Woollahra (1913), with which she may have been confused, but Greycliffe was made in the David Drake yard.

===== Other ferries =====
The yard built a ferry for the Melbourne-Williamstown service, Williamstown, in 1910. It built the twin-screw steam ferry Zephyr—designed by Walter Reeks—for McIlwraith McEacharn, in 1906. After having its engines and other machinery fitted at Morrison and Sinclair, in Sydney, Zephyr was delivered to Fremantle under its own power, calling at Melbourne, Adelaide and Albany. Zephyr operated on the Swan River, from Perth to Fremantle and to Rottnest Island, and was capable of making sea trips to as far as Geraldton. The yard also built ferries, for operation on Brisbane Water and Broken Bay, including Florrie (1879).

Some ferries from the Rock Davis shipyard

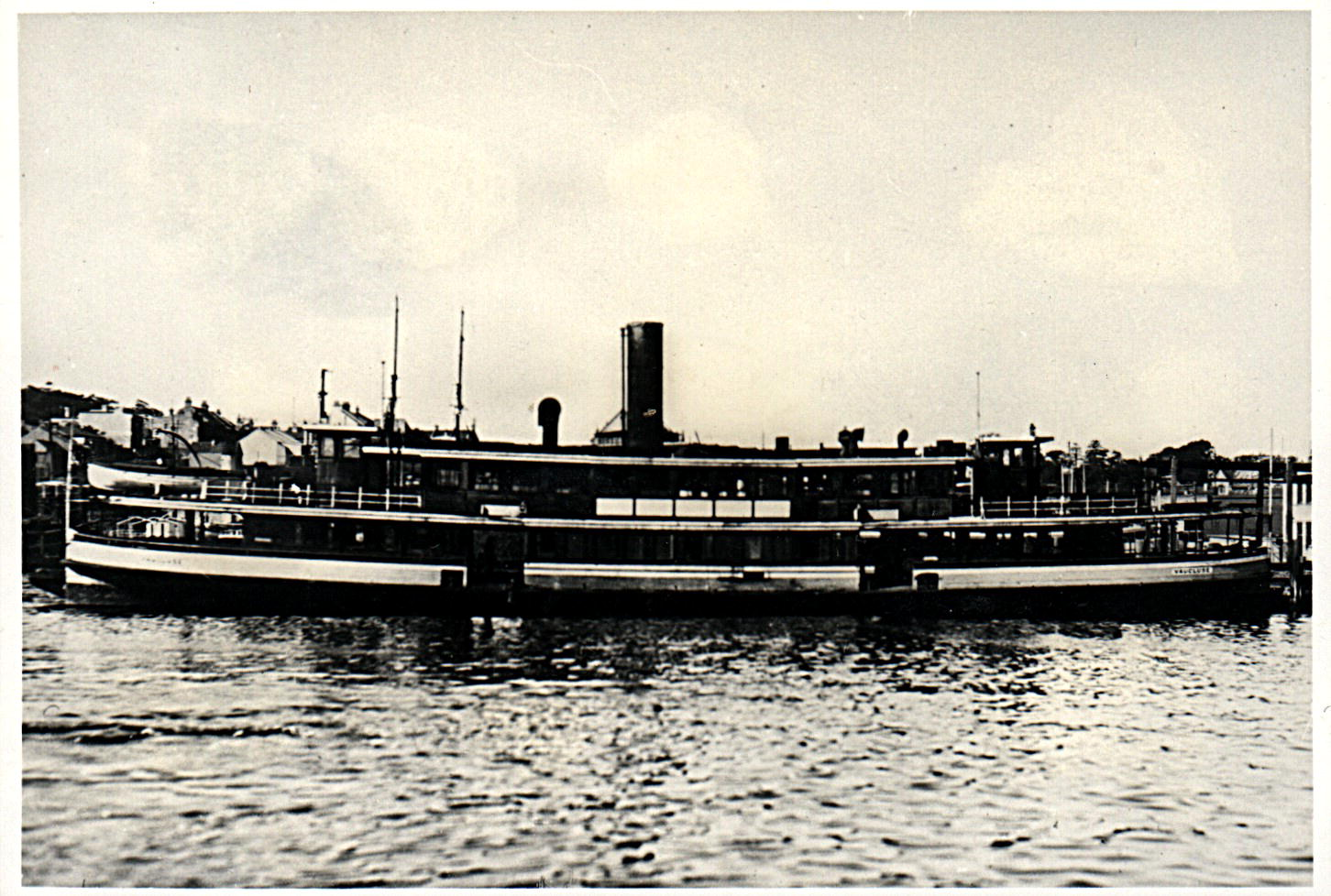
Sydney ferry, Vaucluse

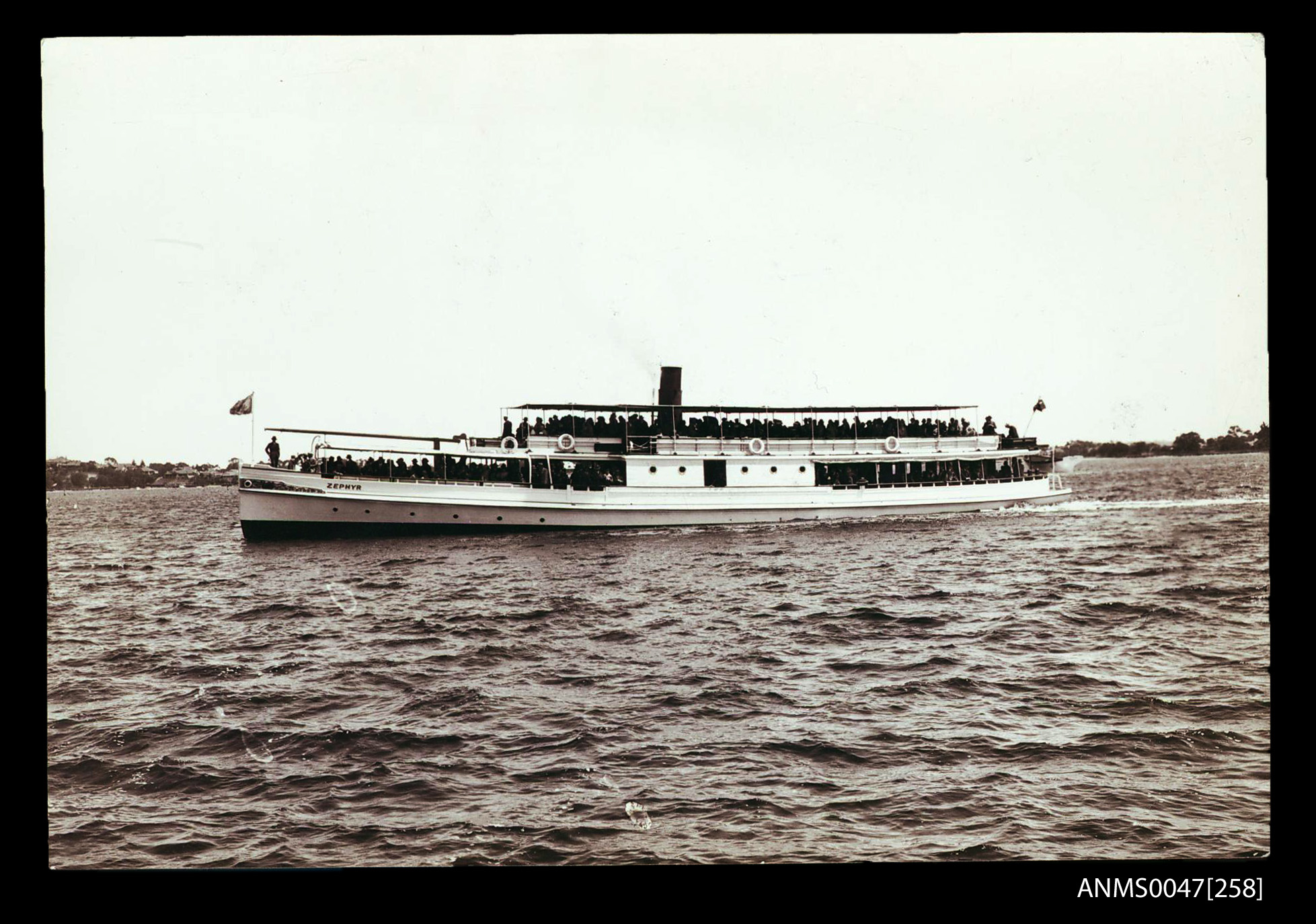
Zephyr, probably on the Swan River, Western Australia

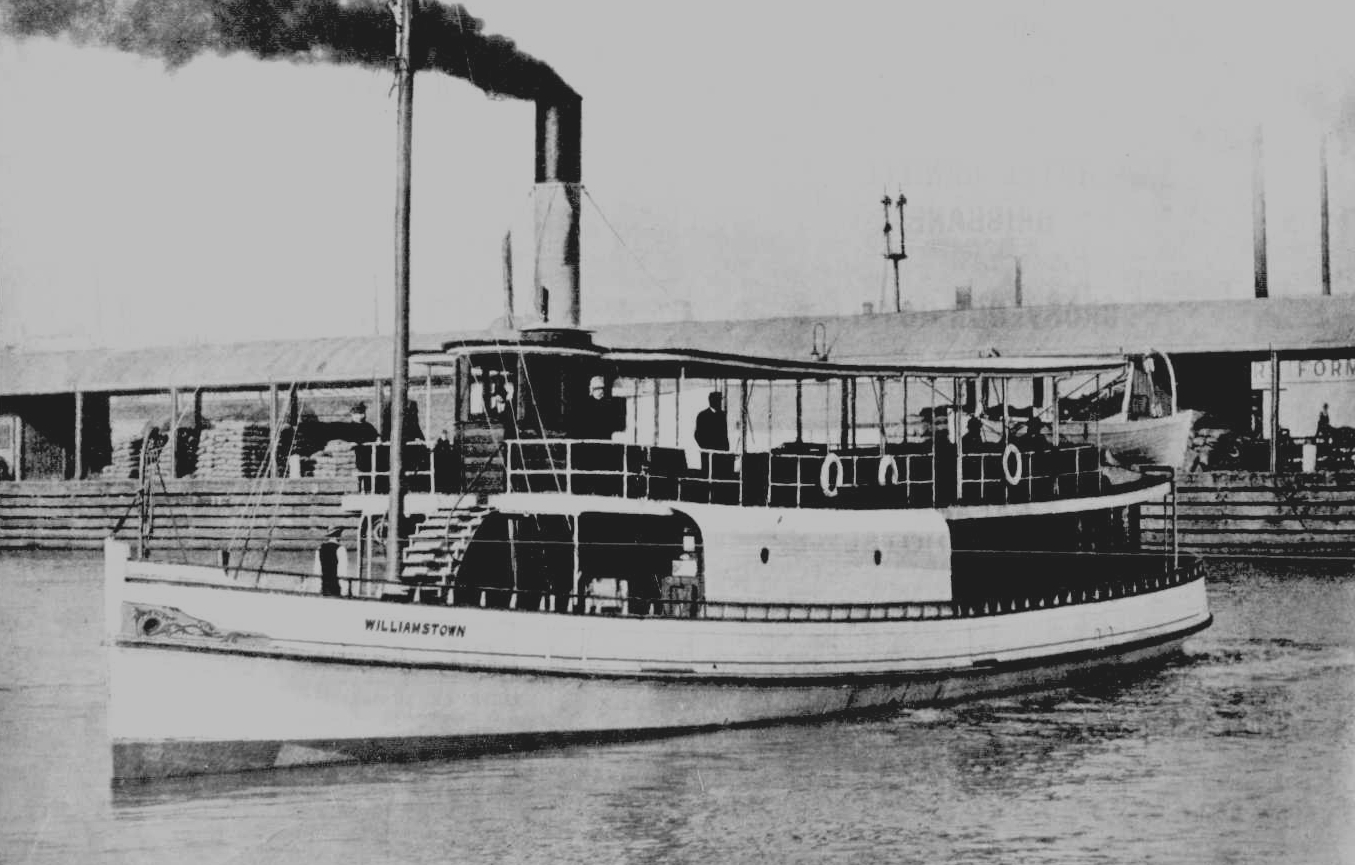
Williamstown (1910)

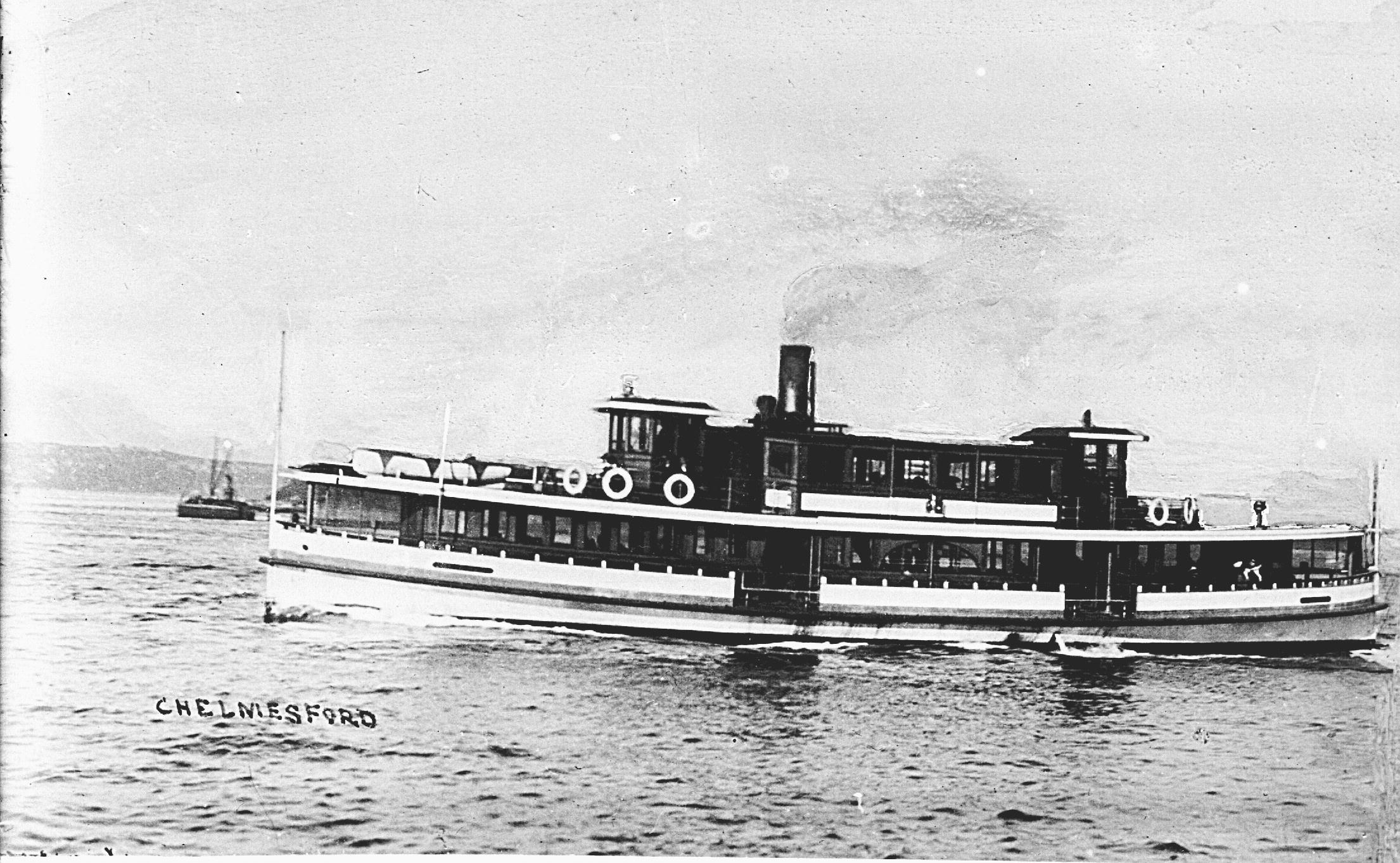
Sydney ferry, Lady Chelmsford

==== Stone Fleet and sixty-miler ships ====
The tough little wooden steamships that the yard made proved well suited to the "Stone Fleet", which brought crushed stone from the southern Illawarra to Sydney. At least four ships built at the Rock Davis shipyard were Stone Fleet ships; Civility (1872), Dunmore (1891), Kiltobranks (1908), and Belbowrie (1911).

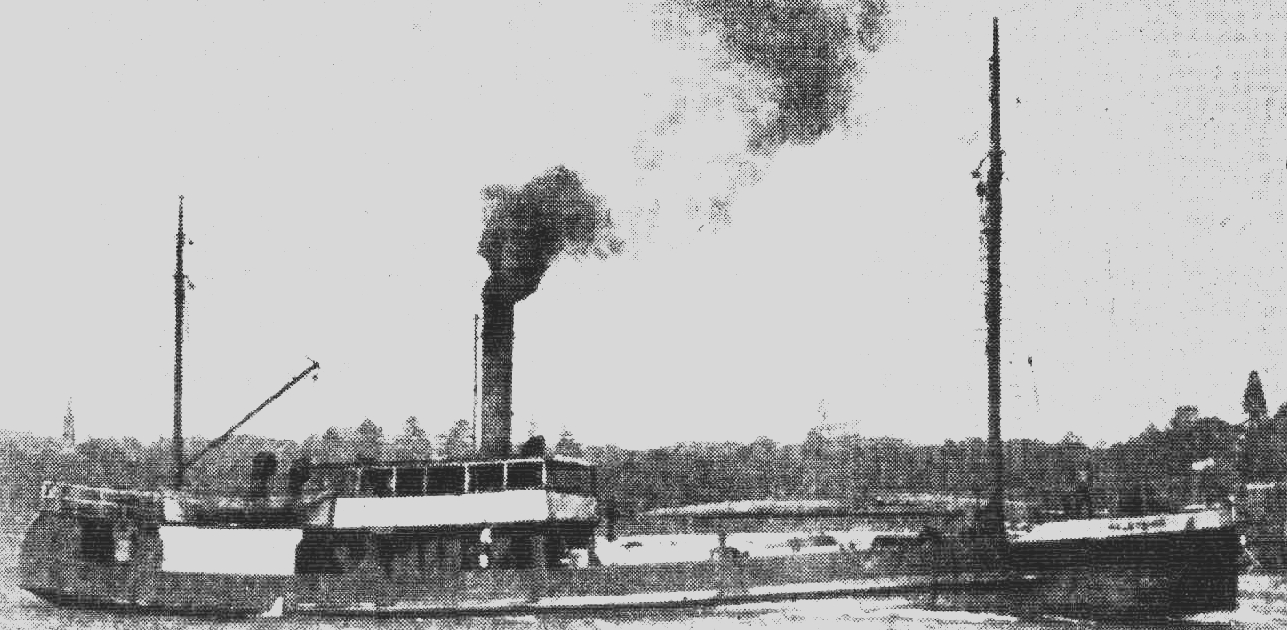
Belbowrie, built in 1911

Ships from the Rock Davis shipyard had a reputation for being well-built, solid, and durable. When the wooden-hull steamer Civility collided with Illawarra, off Kiama, in August 1881, and it was Civility that towed Illawarra back to Kiama. She collided with You Yang in January 1886—after which she sank off Bradleys Head but was apparently refloated—and with Vision in July 1902, surviving to be broken up in 1918. The wooden-hulled Dunmore, survived several collisions, most notably when she collided with the larger steel-hulled sixty-miler, Kelloe, in May 1902; it was Kelloe that sank, with Dunmore picking up her crew before being beached at Kurnell. The small coastal steamer Belbowrie, had several lucky escapes, before she went onto the rocks on the southern side of Maroubra Bay in January 1931.

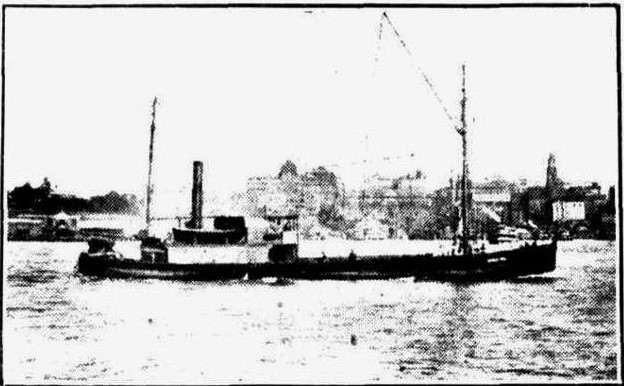
Queen Bee, a wooden sixty-miler

Sixty-miler was the colloquial name for a ship of the coastal coal-carrying trade. Steamships built by the yard that were sixty-milers, were Colo (1903) and Queen Bee (1907). Belbowrie and Dunmore were used also, at times, as sixty-miler colliers.

Little ships like Colo were suited to shallow-water ports such as Sheas Creek, on Botany Bay.

==== Other steamers ====
The yard built Osprey in 1891, and the coastal steamer, Wyalong, in 1902. The yard also built the hull of the short-lived New Zealand owned steamer, Red Pine (1912), said at the time of its construction to be the largest cargo-carrying steamship yet built in Australia.

== Other activities ==
=== Coastal shipping ===
Rock Davis not only built coastal ships, he also owned some vessels working in the coastal shipping trade, such as Friendship Wave and Colo.

=== Local shipping and railway construction ===
Davis did much to progress the development of the area around Blackwall, and operated steamers on Brisbane Water and the Hawkesbury River. In the late 1860s, he was already operating a steamer, Alchymist, from Sydney to the Hawkesbury River, to Mangrove and as far upstream as Windsor, and, beginning in the early 1870s, operated his steam launch, Eva, on Brisbane Water. Davis was an advocate of the Main Northern railway line running via Woy Woy and the western foreshore of Brisbane Water.

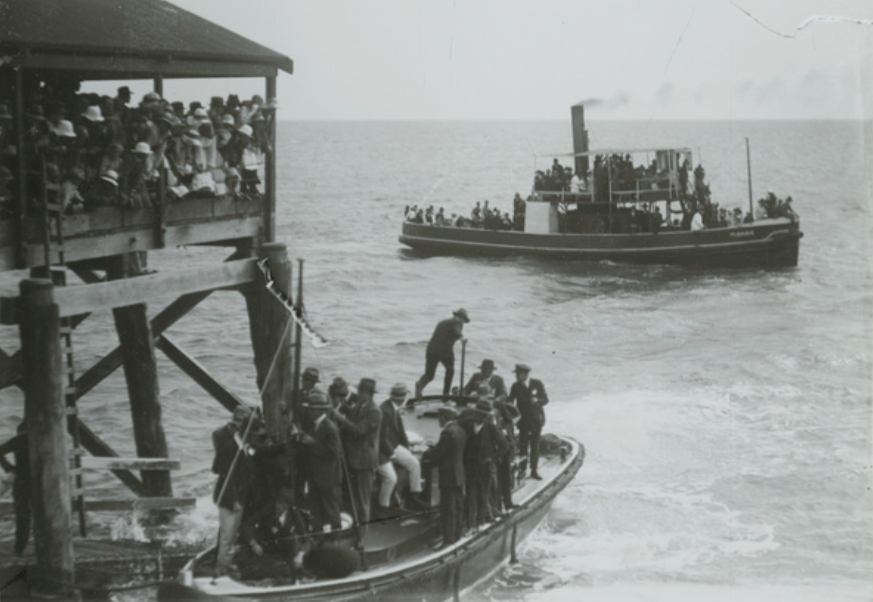
Florrie

The original route from Sydney to Gosford, opened around 1848, was via Peat's Ferry and a road from there to Gosford that took its name from a hairpin bend known as "the Devil's Elbow". Another route was via the open sea, between Broken Bay and Sydney Harbour, but Brisbane Water itself is relatively shallow. It has a narrow inlet, at the location known as Half Tide Rocks, which has swift tidal currents and mobile sand shoals, and is exposed to south-east winds. That entrance is flanked, to its south-west, by a long and wide sand shoal, upon which waves often break, that extends from Ocean Beach nearly to Little Box Head. Further, not far from the entrance, the narrowest part of Brisbane Water, The Rip, is also known for its strong tidal currents. Consequently, Brisbane Water was difficult for ocean-going vessels to navigate.

From 1879, Davis operated a shipping service across the relatively sheltered waters of Broken Bay, to carry passengers, mail, and produce to and from Gosford and Blackwall to the shore of Pittwater, from where it connected with an overland route to Manly, and thence Sydney. It was provided by the small steamer, Florrie, which was constructed in his yard. The service reduced the time, to travel between Gosford and Sydney, from nineteen and a half hours to seven hours.

During the construction of the Woy Woy Tunnel (1884–1887), it was Davis who was given the task of transporting, over the water to the construction site, the many millions of bricks—made at Gore Hill—for the tunnel lining. Completion of the railway, in 1889, significantly reduced the travel time from Sydney, and led to the growth of the town of Woy Woy.

=== Timber getting ===
Davis employed men cutting hardwood timber, around Brisbane Water and the various estuarine waterways that join it. The main species of interest were blue gum, turpentine, blackbutt (ideal for ship frames), red mahogany (also a useful shipbuilding timber), and ironbark. The cut timber was carried by water using scows, sometimes towed by steam launches. The timber was cut from old growth forests.

=== Rescues and assistance to shipping ===
The shipyard lay just above the narrowest part of Brisbane Water, the Rip, which due to its swift tidal currents was difficult to navigate. At times, Rock Davis, would provide assistance to vessels that got into difficulty crossing the Rip. Proximity to Broken Bay allowed him to rescue, or otherwise assist, survivors of shipwrecks, in the area.

In October 1869, the ketch Tim Whiffler, coming from Sydney, was passing by the shipyard when it was caught in a wind squall and suddenly capsized, coming to rest afloat but bottom up. Rock Davis and his workers were quickly at the scene. They rescued all the crew and male passengers. However, three passengers, a mother, her infant child, and her daughter, were in the cabin when the ketch capsized, and became trapped inside the upturned hull. It would be necessary to cut an aperture in the hull—that might allow an escape, but would also cause the entrapped air to escape from the hull and send it to the bottom—which was done. Unfortunately, the daughter did not make it out in time, and went down with the vessel, but the mother and infant were saved. The ketch was raised and returned to service, only to capsize for a second time in 1871, with the loss of three more lives.

In May 1898, Rock Davis was one of the first on the scene of the wreck of the ocean-going paddle steamer, Maitland, at what is now Maitland Bay. He reached the site, using his steam launch, assisted the survivors, and was the source of first news about those survivors. Workers from the shipyard retrieved the bodies of the victims and buried them, at Booker Bay, in wooden coffins made at the shipyard.

== Family, death and legacy ==
Rock Davis married Mary Ann, née Ward, (1837–1922), who had been born at Hardys Bay. They had four children William Benjamin Davis (d.1921), Eva (later Eva Bogan) (d.1883), Rock Davis (Jun.) (d.1913), and Catherine, who died when about 4 years of age. Before her untimely death at only 25, in 1883, Eva Davis performed the christening of vessels, at their launching. Mrs Davis outlived all her children and was the oldest Australian-born resident of the Brisbane Water district, at the time of her death.

Davis died on 27 June 1904, of tuberculosis, at Blackwall. His coffin, draped in the Union Jack, was brought over the Brisbane Water, towed on a specially constructed raft, to St Paul's Anglican Church Cemetery, at Kincumber. There, the resting place of many members of his family and extended family, he was buried on 28 June 1904. Due to the number of mourners and the quantity of flowers, the departure of his last ride across Brisbane Waters had to be delayed, while more watercraft were obtained, and his coffin did not reach the church until nearly sunset.

Rock Davis lies in the cemetery at Kincumber, together with his son and successor, Rock Davis, Junior, and many other members of the Davis family, including three others named Rock Davis.

One of his former employees, in 1923, gave this description of Rock Davis: "By many he was considered a hard man, but he was invariably fair and just in all his dealings, and although he did well for his own, his was the enterprise which kept many families around the old ship-yard, and other parts of the Brisbane Water district. In my time he employed a great number of men, not only in the ship-yard, but cutting timber in the bush, on his ships, and in a variety of other ways".

It was his second son, also Rock—known as "Young Rock" during the life of "Old Rock"—who carried on the shipyard business, until his own death in 1913. By then, the era of large wooden vessels was nearing its end. The types of wooden vessels the Rock Davis yard had built, trading schooners, small steamships, and ferries, were being superseded by steel-hulled vessels—usually imported but otherwise built locally in more sophisticated shipyards—and the demand for new Sydney Harbour ferries was falling, in anticipation of the construction of the Sydney Harbour Bridge. The then recently completed "Lady class" ferries were built with a light construction, in anticipation that they would only be used until the bridge was completed; paradoxically, because they were well-built and economical to operate, they would go on to have very long service lives. Davis's nephew, Arthur, continued to build vessels, at Empire Bay, into the 1930s.

Nothing remains of "the Big Shed". In 1923, it was badly damaged in a gale, and was then demolished. There are two works, made in 1917 and 1918, respectively, by the artist Lionel Lindsay, which show its unusual design; the 1917 etchings and pencil sketches are in the collection of the State Library of New South Wales and the 1918 etching is in the collection of the National Gallery of Australia. Another of Lindsay's etchings, made in 1923, shows a building at the yard—not long before it would have been demolished—and is in the collection of the National Library of Australia. There are builder's half models of the steamers, Alice (1888) and Grazier (1896), both built at the yard, in the collection of the Powerhouse Museum.

Blackwall is now a largely residential suburban area of the Central Coast. The family home, which was adjacent to the north end of the shipyard, still stands at 380 Orange Grove Road / 21 Cedar Crescent, Blackwall, and was for many years the Orange Grove Private Hospital. "Orange Grove" is a reference to the Davis's extensive vegetable and fruit garden. The yard was on the land that is now occupied by the houses on Cedar Crescent, Blackwall. The land that includes the site of the never-dedicated cemetery, where Rock Davis's workers buried the victims of the wrecking of Maitland, is now covered by residential dwellings, at 42-50 Bogan St, Booker Bay, leaving only two Norfolk Island pines from the old burial ground.

Lady Chelmsford near Cremorne Point (1970)

There are no known survivors of the 165 vessels that were constructed in the Rock Davis shipyard, although some had long lives afloat. Zephyr, built in 1906, was retired in 1964. In 1965, she was deliberately sunk by an unknown person, by drilling six holes below the waterline. Raised after ten weeks, she was considered beyond saving and was burned for her copper and brass.

The last surviving vessel was the double-ended single-screw ferry, Lady Chelmsford. She plied the waters of Sydney Harbour, for over sixty years until 1971, first as a steamer and later as a diesel-powered vessel. She was taken to Port Adelaide—making the sea voyage to there under her own power—and used as a showboat until 1985. After being taken to Melbourne in 2005, she sank at her moorings, at Victoria Harbour, Docklands, in 2008, after ninety-eight years afloat. She was demolished, rather than raised, in June 2011, after her hundredth anniversary. Only one of her four sister Lady-class wooden-hulled ferries, Lady Denman, built at Huskisson, survives.
