= Gunvor (disambiguation) =

Gunvor (Gunnvǫr) is a feminine Old Norse given name. It is the feminine of Gunvar (Gunnvarr), a name composed from the elements gunn "fight" and varr "attentive; defender, protector"

Gunvor may also refer to:

- Gunvor (company), an oil trading company
- Gunvor Galtung Haavik (1912–1977), Norwegian foreign ministry official accused of spying for the Soviet Union
- Gunvor Guggisberg (born 1974), Swiss singer knows professionally as Gunvor
- Gunvor, a ship wrecked in 1912
