= List of shipwrecks in 1912 =

The list of shipwrecks in 1912 includes ships sunk, foundered, grounded, or otherwise lost during 1912.

table of contents
1912
Jan	Feb	Mar	Apr
May	Jun	Jul	Aug
Sep	Oct	Nov	Dec
Unknown date

== January ==
=== 1 January ===
List of shipwrecks: 1 January 1912
Ship	State	Description
Jessie A. Bishop	United States	The 754-gross register ton schooner was stranded in Nassau Inlet on the coast of Florida. All eight people on board survived.

=== 4 January ===
List of shipwrecks: 4 January 1912
Ship	State	Description
Stella	United States	The 18-gross register ton sternwheel paddle steamer foundered at Mudds Landing, Illinois. All three people on board survived.

=== 5 January ===
List of shipwrecks: 5 January 1912
Ship	State	Description
James Thomas	United States	The 36-gross register ton schooner was stranded in Delaware Bay. All four people on board survived.
New Boxer	United States	The 60-gross register ton schooner was stranded at Isle au Haut, Maine. The only person on board survived.

=== 6 January ===
List of shipwrecks: 6 January 1912
Ship	State	Description
Alabama	United States	The barge, under tow of Margeret (United States), sank 30 miles (48 km) east south east of the Cape Lookout Lighthouse. Lost with all four hands.
Emily B	United States	The 43-gross register ton motor vessel was stranded in Mosquito Inlet on the coast of Florida. All three people on board survived.
Hattie F. Knowlton	United States	The 36-gross register ton schooner was stranded at Boston, Massachusetts. All four people on board survived.

=== 7 January ===
List of shipwrecks: 7 January 1912
Ship	State	Description
Ayintab	Ottoman Navy	Italo-Turkish War: Battle of Kunfuda Bay: The Taskopru-class gunboat was sunk by Piemonte and Artigliere (both Regia Marina) near Al Qunfudhah, Ottoman Arabia.
Bafra	Ottoman Navy	Italo-Turkish War: Battle of Kunfuda Bay: The Taskopru-class gunboat was sunk by Piemonte and Artigliere (both Regia Marina) near Al Qunfudhah, Ottoman Arabia.
Gökcedag	Ottoman Navy	Italo-Turkish War: Battle of Kunfuda Bay: The Taskopru-class gunboat was sunk by Piemonte and Artigliere (both Regia Marina) near Al Qunfudhah, Ottoman Arabia.
Kastamonu	Ottoman Navy	Italo-Turkish War: Battle of Kunfuda Bay: The Kastamonu-class gunboat was sunk by Piemonte and Artigliere (both Regia Marina) near Al Qunfudhah, Ottoman Arabia.
Muha	Ottoman Navy	Italo-Turkish War: Battle of Kunfuda Bay: The gunboat was destroyed in action with Italian warships near Al Qunfudhah, Ottoman Arabia.
Ordu	Ottoman Navy	Italo-Turkish War: Battle of Kunfuda Bay: The Taskopru-class gunboat was sunk by Piemonte and Artigliere (both Regia Marina) near Al Qunfudhah, Ottoman Arabia.
Refahiye	Ottoman Navy	Italo-Turkish War: Battle of Kunfuda Bay: The Taskopru-class gunboat was sunk by Piemonte and Artigliere (both Regia Marina) near Al Qunfudhah, Ottoman Arabia.
Sipka	Ottoman Navy	Italo-Turkish War: Battle of Kunfuda Bay: The armed yacht was sunk by Piemonte and Artigliere (both Regia Marina) near Al Qunfudhah, Ottoman Arabia.

=== 8 January ===
List of shipwrecks: 8 January 1912
Ship	State	Description
Annie F. Kimball	United States	The 401-gross register ton schooner foundered in the Atlantic Ocean off Cape Hatteras, North Carolina. All seven people on board lost their lives.
Annie L. Russell	United States	The 49-gross register ton schooner was stranded in Hereford Inlet on the coast of New Jersey. All three people on board lost their lives.
Empress	United States	The 120-gross register ton schooner was stranded at Cape Elizabeth, Maine. All four people on board survived.
Jos. L. Stephens	United States	The 85-gross register ton sternwheel paddle steamer burned at Cairo, Illinois. All four people on board survived.

=== 9 January ===
List of shipwrecks: 9 January 1912
Ship	State	Description
Alabama	United States	The 881-gross register ton schooner barge foundered in the Atlantic Ocean 50 nautical miles (93 km; 58 mi) southwest of Cape Hatteras, North Carolina. All four people on board lost their lives.
Creedmoor	United States	The 10-gross register ton motor vessel was stranded at Stonington, Maine. Both people on board survived.
Pocomoke	United States	The 827-gross register ton schooner barge foundered in the Atlantic Ocean 50 nautical miles (93 km; 58 mi) southwest of Cape Hatteras, North Carolina. All four people on board survived.
Sterling	United States	The 2,364-gross register ton schooner barge foundered off Block Island off the coast of Rhode Island. All six people on board survived.
Tourist	United States	The 6-gross register ton motor vessel was stranded on the coast of Mexico at Point San Miguel. The only person on board survived.

=== 10 January ===
List of shipwrecks: 10 January 1912
Ship	State	Description
Carolyn	United States	The 2,241-gross register ton steel-hulled screw steamer was stranded on Metinic Island on the coast of Maine. Raised 17 August, repaired and returned to service. All 27 people on board survived.
Jennie Thelin	United States	The 145-gross register ton schooner was stranded at Punta Maria on the Baja California Peninsula in Mexico. All eight people on board survived.
Nellie	United States	With no one on board, the 17-gross register ton motor vessel foundered in Ocracoke Inlet on the coast of North Carolina.

=== 11 January ===
List of shipwrecks: 11 January 1912
Ship	State	Description
W. E. Morrissey	United States	The 123-gross register ton schooner was stranded on the coast of Newfoundland. All eight people on board survived.

=== 13 January ===
List of shipwrecks: 13 January 1912
Ship	State	Description
Admiral	United States	The 683-gross register ton schooner was stranded on the Oregon bank of the Columbia River. All 12 people on board survived.
F. B. Williams	United States	The 86-gross register ton sternwheel paddle steamer burned on Bayou Teche at Belle River, Louisiana. All 11 people on board survived.
T. T. Co. No. 11	United States	The 395-gross register ton barge was abandoned in the Gulf of Mexico. The only person on board survived.
Whale Bay	United States	The 12-gross register ton motor vessel burned on the Mississippi River at New Orleans, Louisiana. All four people on board survived.
William R. Wilson	United States	The 1,385-gross register ton schooner was stranded on Pickles Reef off the coast of Florida. All 10 people on board survived.

=== 16 January ===
List of shipwrecks: 16 January 1912
Ship	State	Description
Hattie C. Luce	United States	The 335-gross register ton schooner was abandoned in the Atlantic Ocean at 32°38′N 069°12′W. All seven people on board survived.

=== 18 January ===
List of shipwrecks: 18 January 1912
Ship	State	Description
Corozal	United States	The 283-gross register ton sternwheel paddle steamer burned at New Orleans, Louisiana. The only person on board survived.
Harry Prescott	United States	The 433-gross register ton schooner foundered off Cape Hatteras, North Carolina. All seven people on board survived.

=== 19 January ===
List of shipwrecks: 19 January 1912
Ship	State	Description
Mary E	United States	The 11-gross register ton motor paddle vessel was crushed by ice at Paris Landing, Indiana. Both people on board survived.

=== 20 January ===
List of shipwrecks: 20 January 1912
Ship	State	Description
Adonis	United States	The tugboat was sunk by ice at the wharf of the Stone Express Company, in Lynn, Massachusetts.
North Star No. 1	United States	The 8-gross register ton motor vessel was stranded in Coos Bay on the coast of Oregon with the loss of all six people on board.

=== 21 January ===
List of shipwrecks: 21 January 1912
Ship	State	Description
Bayardo	United Kingdom	Bayardo The refrigerated cargo ship ran aground on the Middle Sand, in the Humber and was wrecked.
S. B. Duncan	United States	The 432-gross register ton sternwheel paddle steamer burned on the Mississippi River at Vicksburg, Mississippi. The only person on board survived.

=== 23 January ===
List of shipwrecks: 23 January 1912
Ship	State	Description
Calderon	United Kingdom	Collided with Musketeer (United Kingdom) in the Crosby Channel. Beached but broke in two, a total loss.
Ebony	United States	The lighter sank at the wharf of the New England Coal and Coke Company, Everett, Massachusetts. Later raised.

=== 26 January ===
List of shipwrecks: 26 January 1912
Ship	State	Description
Black Head	United Kingdom	The cargo ship was wrecked on the Tein Reef, off Bornholm, Denmark. She was on a voyage from Riga, Russia to Belfast, County Antrim.

=== 27 January ===
List of shipwrecks: 27 January 1912
Ship	State	Description
Esther	United States	The 15-gross register ton screw steamer was lost in a collision with the screw steamer No. 17 M.F.D. (United States) at Milwaukee, Wisconsin. All four people on board survived.
Paul	United States	The 91-gross register ton motor vessel was lost in a collision with the screw steamer Heredia (United Kingdom) on the Mississippi River off Poverty Point in Louisiana. All 13 people on board survived.

=== 29 January ===
List of shipwrecks: 29 January 1912
Ship	State	Description
Morris L. Keen	United States	The 21-gross register ton screw steamer foundered in Baltimore Harbor off the coast of Maryland. All four people on board survived.

=== 31 January ===
List of shipwrecks: 31 January 1912
Ship	State	Description
J. C. Austin	United States	The canal boat struck a rock and sank at Northport, New York.
Warner Miller Co	United States	The canal boat was sunk by ice at Northport, New York.

== February ==
=== 2 February ===
List of shipwrecks: 2 February 1912
Ship	State	Description
HMS A3	Royal Navy	The A-class submarine collided with the submarine tender HMS Hazard (Royal Navy) in the Solent off the Isle of Wight with the loss of all 14 hands. Refloated in March and sunk as a gunnery target off Portland Bill on 17 May.
Ida McKay	United States	The 187-gross register ton schooner was abandoned in the Pacific Ocean at 40°59′N 130°41′W. All seven people on board survived.

=== 3 February ===
List of shipwrecks: 3 February 1912
Ship	State	Description
Lawrence Redican	United States	The barge sank in the Thames River off Allyns Point, Connecticut.
Leona	United States	With no one on board, the 145-gross register ton sternwheel paddle steamer burned at La Center, Washington.

=== 4 February ===
List of shipwrecks: 4 February 1912
Ship	State	Description
Consols	United Kingdom	The British steamer, laden with cotton from Galveston, Texas, for Hamburg, Germany, caught fire and sank approximately 40 miles (64 km) south of Cape Henry. All crew were rescued.
Frank M. Low	United States	The 542-gross register ton schooner burned off Cape Romain, South Carolina. All six people on board survived.
Josie M	United States	The 16-gross register ton schooner was stranded at New Orleans, Louisiana. All three people on board survived.

=== 7 February ===
List of shipwrecks: 7 February 1912
Ship	State	Description
Sulby	United Kingdom	The 130.3-foot (39.7 m), 287-ton steam fishing trawler stranded 3 nautical miles (5.6 km) north of Ramsey. Initial efforts to refloat her on 19 February failed. She was eventually pulled off, arriving at Fleetwood on 7 April. Repaired and returned to service.

=== 11 February ===
List of shipwrecks: 11 February 1912
Ship	State	Description
Maud	United Kingdom	The 125-foot (38 m), 233-ton steam trawler sprung a leak while under tow by the tug Challenger (United Kingdom) on 10 February. Pumps were put aboard, the crew taken off, and the tow continued. On 11 February she started sinking in a gale, became waterlogged, went ashore and was wrecked in Kynance Bay near The Lizard.

=== 12 February ===
List of shipwrecks: 12 February 1912
Ship	State	Description
Elzada	United States	The 24-gross register ton schooner was stranded at Pensacola, Florida. All three people on board survived.
Maud	United Kingdom	The Fleetwood trawler drifted ashore at Kynance Cove, Cornwall, when her tow broke.
Number Sixteen	United States	The 929-gross register ton schooner barge was stranded in Nantucket Sound at Great Point on the coast of Massachusetts. All five people on board survived.

=== 14 February ===
List of shipwrecks: 14 February 1912
Ship	State	Description
Swallow	United Kingdom	The 71.3-foot (21.7 m), 53-ton fishing smack sank in Morecambe Bay.

=== 15 February ===
List of shipwrecks: 15 February 1912
Ship	State	Description
Emerald	United States	The 17-gross register ton schooner foundered off Bay Keys, Florida. All three people on board survived.

=== 16 February ===
List of shipwrecks: 16 February 1912
Ship	State	Description
Taurus	United States	The 228-gross register ton steel-hulled screw steamer was stranded in the Mississippi River in South Pass on the coast of Louisiana. All 16 people on board survived.

=== 17 February ===
List of shipwrecks: 17 February 1912
Ship	State	Description
Charioteer	United Kingdom	The tug foundered in the Bristol Channel with the loss of all five crew.

=== 18 February ===
List of shipwrecks: 18 February 1912
Ship	State	Description
Charles K. Mulford	United States	The barge was sunk by ice on the west side of the channel at New Haven, Connecticut.
Erne	United Kingdom	The full-rigged ship was abandoned in the Atlantic Ocean with the loss of ten of her nineteen crew. She was on a voyage from Boston, Massachusetts, United States, to Buenos Aires, Argentina.

=== 19 February ===
List of shipwrecks: 19 February 1912
Ship	State	Description
Marion E. Bulley	United States	The barge was sunk by ice near City Point, New Haven, Connecticut.

=== 21 February ===
List of shipwrecks: 21 February 1912
Ship	State	Description
Leora M. Thurlow	United States	The schooner went ashore in a gale on Goshen Point, Connecticut.

=== 22 February ===
List of shipwrecks: 22 February 1912
Ship	State	Description
Carolina	United States	The 334-gross register ton barge was lost in a collision with the barge Ellen S. Jennings (United States) in the Chesapeake Bay off Poplar Island off the coast of Maryland. Both people on board survived.
Ellen S. Jennings	United States	The 330-gross register ton barge was lost in a collision with the barge Carolina (United States) in the Chesapeake Bay off Poplar Island off the coast of Maryland. Both people on board survived.
Julia M. Dempsey	United States	The barge went ashore on Middle Pond Island, Rhode Island.

=== 23 February ===
List of shipwrecks: 23 February 1912
Ship	State	Description
Ada V	United States	With no one on board, the 23-gross register ton sternwheel paddle steamer burned on the Ohio River at Ripley, Ohio.
Carrier Dove	United States	The 92-gross register ton motor vessel was stranded in Discovery Passage on the coast of British Columbia, Canada. All 15 people on board survived.
Lolo	United States	The 13-gross register ton schooner foundered off Maunabo, Puerto Rico. All three people on board survived.
Nearchus	United States	The 1,271-gross register ton barge burned at Point Judith, Rhode Island. All four people on board survived.

=== 24 February ===
List of shipwrecks: 24 February 1912
Ship	State	Description
Ankara	Ottoman Navy	Italo-Turkish War: Battle of Beirut: Ankara The Antalya-class torpedo boat was sunk by gunfire in Beirut harbour by the armoured cruisers Francesco Ferruccio and Giuseppe Garibaldi (both Regia Marina).
Avnillâh	Ottoman Navy	Italo-Turkish War: Battle of Beirut: The hulked former Avnillah-class casemate ironclad coast defense vessel was damaged by gunfire by armoured cruisers Francesco Ferruccio and Giuseppe Garibaldi (both Regia Marina) and then torpedoed and sunk with her decks awash in Beirut harbour by Giuseppe Garibaldi. 58 crewmen killed, 108 wounded.
Unidentified lighters	Ottoman Empire	Italo-Turkish War: Battle of Beirut: Six lighters were sunk by a torpedo while tied up to the Mole in Beirut harbour by the armored cruiser Giuseppe Garibaldi (Regia Marina).

=== 26 February ===
List of shipwrecks: 26 February 1912
Ship	State	Description
Mildred V. Nunan	United States	The 79-gross register ton schooner was stranded at Cape Porpoise, Maine. All 10 people on board survived.

=== 27 February ===
List of shipwrecks: 27 February 1912
Ship	State	Description
Goldsboro	United States	The 681-gross register ton screw steamer was stranded on the Brandywine Shoals off the coast of Delaware. All 14 people on board survived.
H. K. Bedford	United States	H. K. Bedford The 139-gross register ton sternwheel paddle steamer was crushed by ice on the Ohio River at Waverly, West Virginia. All 29 people on board survived.

=== 28 February ===
List of shipwrecks: 28 February 1912
Ship	State	Description
Carrie B. Schwing	United States	The 98-gross register ton sternwheel paddle steamer burned in Bayou Natchez in Louisiana. All eight people on board survived.

=== 29 February ===
List of shipwrecks: 29 February 1912
Ship	State	Description
J. E. Trudeau	United States	The 242-gross register ton sternwheel paddle steamer burned at Belle River, Louisiana, killing 10 of the 45 people on board.

=== Unknown date ===
List of shipwrecks: Unknown date February 1912
Ship	State	Description
Augsburg	Germany	On 2 February the 4,287 GRT cargo steamship left New York for Durban with a crew of 37 or 39 men. She was listed as overdue, and a search by SMS Bremen, and the Hamburg America Line ships Ypiranga and Caledonia failed to find any trace of her.
Blanche	United States	With no one on board, the 15-gross register ton barge was crushed by ice on the Ohio River at Wheeling, West Virginia.

== March ==
=== 1 March ===
List of shipwrecks: 1 March 1912
Ship	State	Description
Float No. 1	United States	The 592-gross register ton barge foundered in Mobjack Bay on the coast of Virginia. Both people on board survived.

=== 2 March ===
List of shipwrecks: 2 March 1912
Ship	State	Description
Bob Blanks	United States	The 265-gross register ton sternwheel paddle steamer burned at Raccourei Landing, Louisiana. All 70 people on board survived.

=== 3 March ===
List of shipwrecks: 3 March 1912
Ship	State	Description
Rosalia d'Ali	Italy	The barque was sunk in a collision with Princess Anne (United States) in a snowstorm off Sewall Point in Hampton Roads, sinking in 40 feet (12 m) of water.
Undine	United States	The 42-gross register ton screw steamer was lost when she struck a log in Currituck Sound off the coast of North Carolina. All 11 people on board survived.

=== 5 March ===
List of shipwrecks: 5 March 1912
Ship	State	Description
Bessie	United Kingdom	The Truro-registered three-masted schooner was forced to shelter in Newquay Bay, Cornwall in a strong north wind and drifted ashore when her anchor fouled. Two of the crew were saved by breeches buoy, the others clambered up the 100 ft (30 m) cliff on the cliff ladder. She was on a voyage from Ballincurragh, County Cork to Penryn.
Helen Thomas	United States	The 1,470-gross register ton schooner was stranded on the Cape Charles Shoals off the coast of Virginia. All 11 people on board survived.
Illawarra	Norway	The full-rigged ship was abandoned whilst on a voyage from Leith, Lothian, United Kingdom to Coquimbo, Chile.

=== 6 March ===
List of shipwrecks: 6 March 1912
Ship	State	Description
Curlew	United States	The 10-gross register ton motor vessel was lost in a collision with the screw steamer Columbia (United States) in Coos Bay off North Bend, Oregon. The only person on board survived.

=== 8 March ===
List of shipwrecks: 8 March 1912
Ship	State	Description
Louisa R	United States	The 7-gross register ton sloop burned in Palacios Bayou in Texas. Both people on board survived.

=== 9 March ===
List of shipwrecks: 9 March 1912
Ship	State	Description
Jennie B	United States	The 48-gross register ton screw steamer burned on the Atchafalaya River at Berwick, Louisiana. All three people on board survived.

=== 11 March ===
List of shipwrecks: 11 March 1912
Ship	State	Description
Flora M. Hill	United States	The 623-gross register ton steel-hulled screw steamer was crushed by ice at Chicago, Illinois. All 30 people on board survived.

=== 12 March ===
List of shipwrecks: 12 March 1912
Ship	State	Description
John W. Hall	United States	The 346-gross register ton schooner was stranded at Ocean City, Maryland. All seven people on board survived.
L. B. Shaw	United States	The steam barge was stranded on rocks on the West Island Bar, Buzzard's Bay, Massachusetts.
Leo	United States	The 37-gross register ton motor vessel burned off Thacher Island off Cape Ann on the coast of Massachusetts. All eight people on board survived.
Oceana	United Kingdom	The passenger liner sank after a collision with Pisagua (Germany) off Beachy Head, Sussex.
Wendur	United Kingdom	The Glasgow sailing vessel struck the southernmost rock of the Seven Stones Reef while carrying grain from Plymouth, Devon. Three of the twenty-one crew lost their lives. She held the record for the fastest voyage between Newcastle and Valparaíso.

=== 13 March ===
List of shipwrecks: 13 March 1912
Ship	State	Description
Jessie Lena	United States	The 347-gross register ton schooner was stranded on Timber Island in Maine. All seven people on board survived.

=== 15 March ===
List of shipwrecks: 15 March 1912
Ship	State	Description
Enos Taylor	United States	The 64-gross register ton sternwheel paddle steamer burned on the Ohio River at Dekoven, Kentucky. All seven people on board survived.
Patrician	United States	The 125-gross register ton schooner was stranded at Jordan Bay, Nova Scotia, Canada. Ten of the 20 people on board lost their lives.
St. Leon	United States	The 83-gross register ton schooner was stranded in Pigeon Hill Bay on the coast of the Maine. All three people on board survived.
Thaxter	United States	The 843-gross register ton schooner barge foundered in the Atlantic Ocean 12 nautical miles (22 km; 14 mi) southeast of Shinnecock, Long Island, New York. All four people on board lost their lives.

=== 16 March ===
List of shipwrecks: 16 March 1912
Ship	State	Description
Herbert D. Maxwell	United States	The schooner was sunk in a collision with Gloucester (United States), near Thomas Point in the Chesapeake Bay. Lost with four hands killed.

=== 20 March ===
List of shipwrecks: 20 March 1912
Ship	State	Description
Koombana	Australia	The passenger, cargo, and mail steamer disappeared in a tropical cyclone in the Indian Ocean off the coast of Western Australia during a voyage from Port Hedland to Broome with the loss of all 150 people on board.

=== 21 March ===
List of shipwrecks: 21 March 1912
Ship	State	Description
City of Cardiff	United Kingdom	Wrecked at Nanjizal on the west coast of Cornwall. All on board were rescued.

=== 22 March ===
List of shipwrecks: 22 March 1912
Ship	State	Description
Captain Ed Riley	United States	The canal boat, under tow of the canal boat William E. Cleary (United States), was wrecked on Bartletts Reef near New London, Connecticut, and went to pieces.
Fawn	United States	The 42-gross register ton screw steamer was stranded at Myrtle Beach, South Carolina. All five people on board survived.

=== 23 March ===
List of shipwrecks: 23 March 1912
Ship	State	Description
Pollux	Sweden	The steamship was sunk in the Skaggerak, near Hanstholm in collision with German battleship SMS Elsass.

=== 24 March ===
List of shipwrecks: 24 March 1912
Ship	State	Description
Elm City	United States	The 672-gross register ton schooner foundered off Cape Hatteras, North Carolina, with the loss of two lives. There were five survivors.

=== 25 March ===
List of shipwrecks: 25 March 1912
Ship	State	Description
Gaston	United States	The 1,442-gross register ton schooner barge was stranded on Cobb Island on the coast of Virginia. All four people on board survived.
S. D. Carleton	United States	The 1,874-gross register ton schooner barge was stranded on Cobb Island on the coast of Virginia. All five people on board survived.
Wade	United States	The 33-gross register ton sternwheel paddle steamer foundered in the Mississippi River at New Orleans, Louisiana. All seven people on board survived.

=== 27 March ===
List of shipwrecks: 27 March 1912
Ship	State	Description
Florence	United States	The 9-gross register ton sloop foundered in the mouth of the Galveston Jetties on the coast of Texas. The only person on board survived.

=== 28 March ===
List of shipwrecks: 28 March 1912
Ship	State	Description
James M. Gifford	United States	The fishing steamer sank at the Oneco Works Wharf in New London, Connecticut. Later raised.
Josefina	United States	The 9-gross register ton sloop was stranded at Guánica, Puerto Rico. Both people on board survived.

== April ==
=== 2 April ===
List of shipwrecks: 2 April 1912
Ship	State	Description
Loula E. Dedrick	United States	With no one on board, the 12-gross register ton motor paddle vessel burned at Carrollton, Kentucky.
USS Santee	United States Navy	The school ship sank at her berth at the United States Naval Academy in Annapolis, Maryland. She was refloated six months later and was burned as a means of disposal and scrapping in 1913.

=== 3 April ===
List of shipwrecks: 3 April 1912
Ship	State	Description
Augusta	United States	The 7-gross register ton sloop foundered in Galveston Bay off the coast of Texas. The only person on board survived.
Margery	United States	The barge sank at the entrance to the harbor at Lynn, Massachusetts.

=== 4 April ===
List of shipwrecks: 4 April 1912
Ship	State	Description
Rose	United States	With no one on board, the 19-gross register ton motor vessel burned at Mandarin, Florida.

=== 5 April ===
List of shipwrecks: 5 April 1912
Ship	State	Description
G. W. Watson	United States	The 452-gross register ton schooner was stranded on the coast of Tahiti. All nine people on board survived.
Pegg	United States	The 13-gross register ton motor vessel burned at Rock Slough in California, killing one of the four people on board.

=== 6 April ===
List of shipwrecks: 6 April 1912
Ship	State	Description
Gunvor	Norway	Gunvor wrecked Wrecked on the Pedn-Men-an-Mor rocks, Black Head, The Lizard, Cornwall, United Kingdom. Her crew scrambled to safety.
Mildred	United Kingdom	The barquentine struck rocks at Gurnard's Head, Cornwall in dense fog and sank with her sails set. No lives lost.

=== 7 April ===
List of shipwrecks: 7 April 1912
Ship	State	Description
Gladys	United States	The 26-gross register ton sloop foundered off Charleston, South Carolina. All three people on board survived.
Rhenania	Netherlands	She was wrecked on Burhou Island, Channel Islands when en route from Rotterdam for Bilbao.

=== 8 April ===
List of shipwrecks: 8 April 1912
Ship	State	Description
Arkinsaw	United States	The 14-gross register ton motor paddle vessel foundered in the Arkansas River in Arkansas. Both people on board survived.
Ontario	United States	The steamer caught fire and ran ashore at Montauk Point, New York. 29 women and children passengers were taken off by the tug Tasco (United States) while the crew remained aboard to fight the fire.

=== 12 April ===
List of shipwrecks: 12 April 1912
Ship	State	Description
Fredericka Schepp	United States	The 268-gross register ton schooner was stranded in the Cape Verde Islands. All nine people on board survived.
P G #1	United States	Under tow along with the scows P G #4 and P G #5 (both United States), the 33-ton scow was wrecked on rocks at Montague Island at the entrance to Prince William Sound on the south-central coast of the District of Alaska after her towing line parted in a gale.
P G #4	United States	Under tow along with the scows P G #1 and P G #5 (both United States), the 7-ton scow was wrecked on rocks at Montague Island at the entrance to Prince William Sound on the south-central coast of the District of Alaska after her towing line parted in a gale.
P G #5	United States	Under tow along with the scows P G #1 and P G #4 (both United States), the 7-ton scow was wrecked on rocks at Montague Island at the entrance to Prince William Sound on the south-central coast of the District of Alaska after her towing line parted in a gale.

=== 15 April ===
List of shipwrecks: 15 April 1912
Ship	State	Description
Titanic	United Kingdom	Sank after striking an iceberg. 1,496 died. Der Untergang Titanic by Willi Stöwer

=== 18 April ===
List of shipwrecks: 18 April 1912
Ship	State	Description
Kittee	United States	The 6-gross register ton motor vessel burned on the Mississippi River at Thebes, Illinois. All three people aboard survived.

=== 20 April ===
List of shipwrecks: 20 April 1912
Ship	State	Description
Addie and Carrie	United States	The wrecking lighter sank southwest of Shagwong Reef in Long Island Sound.
Geisha	United States	The 23-gross register ton motor yacht was lost when she struck a dock at Charleston, South Carolina. All seven people on board survived.

=== 21 April ===
List of shipwrecks: 21 April 1912
Ship	State	Description
Joseph Russ	United States	The 247-gross register ton, 124-foot (37.8 m) schooner was wrecked with the loss of one life on the northeast coast of Chirikof Island in the Gulf of Alaska. Her 35 survivors reached the island. Six of them sailed to Chignik Bay on the Alaska Peninsula in two dories with news of the wreck, and the steamer Dora (United States) arrived at Chirikof Island soon thereafter to rescue the 29 survivors who remained there.

=== 25 April ===
List of shipwrecks: 25 April 1912
Ship	State	Description
Telegraph	United States	The 386-gross register ton sternwheel paddle steamer was lost in a collision with the screw steamer Alameda (United States) off Seattle, Washington. All 18 people on board survived.

=== 27 April ===
List of shipwrecks: 27 April 1912
Ship	State	Description
Vida	United States	With no one on board, the 42-gross register ton motor vessel was stranded on the Tillamook Bar off the coast of Oregon.

=== 28 April ===
List of shipwrecks: 28 April 1912
Ship	State	Description
Winnie Lawry	United States	The 246-gross register ton schooner was stranded at Rockport, Massachusetts. All five people on board survived.

=== 29 April ===
List of shipwrecks: 29 April 1912
Ship	State	Description
Texas	United States	Italo-Turkish War: The passenger/cargo ship was sunk by a mine in the entrance to the Gulf of Smyrna. 65 passengers and crew were killed and 70 rescued.

=== 30 April ===
List of shipwrecks: 30 April 1912
Ship	State	Description
James Duffield	United States	The 187-gross register ton schooner was stranded at Cape Henlopen, Delaware. All six people on board survived.

=== Unknown date ===
List of shipwrecks: Unknown date April 1912
Ship	State	Description
Laclabell	United States	With no one on board, the 12-gross register ton motor vessel foundered at Ketchikan, District of Alaska.

== May ==
=== 3 May ===
List of shipwrecks: 3 May 1912
Ship	State	Description
Amarapoora	United Kingdom	The 100.7-foot (30.7 m), 148-ton steam trawler was sunk in a collision with fishing steamer Martaban (United Kingdom) who rescued her 9 crew.

=== 5 May ===
List of shipwrecks: 5 May 1912
Ship	State	Description
Katie Mc	United States	With no one on board, the 41-gross register ton sternwheel paddle steamer burned on the Ohio River at Proctorville, Ohio.
Lottie	United States	The 19-gross register ton schooner burned in Choctawhatchee Bay on the coast of Florida. All four people on board survived.

=== 8 May ===
List of shipwrecks: 8 May 1912
Ship	State	Description
Estelle	United States	The 182-gross register ton barge was lost in a collision with the screw steamer Antaeus (United Kingdom) on the Delaware River off New Castle, Delaware. Both people on board survived.

=== 10 May ===
List of shipwrecks: 10 May 1912
Ship	State	Description
Hayden Brown	United States	The barge, under tow by Pioneer (United States), was cut loose by the tug in a heavy gale off Cape St. Elias to save herself. The barge was driven ashore and seven of eight crew died.

=== 12 May ===
List of shipwrecks: 12 May 1912
Ship	State	Description
HMS A3	Royal Navy	The refloated wreck of the A-class submarine was sunk as a gunnery target in the English Channel near Portland Bill.
Walter P. Goulart	United States	The 84-gross register ton schooner was stranded at Shelburne, Nova Scotia, with the loss of one life. There were 13 survivors.

=== 13 May ===
List of shipwrecks: 13 May 1912
Ship	State	Description
Jennette	United States	The 11-gross register ton motor vessel burned in Puget Sound off Sandy Point, Washington. All three people on board survived.

=== 14 May ===
List of shipwrecks: 14 May 1912
Ship	State	Description
Henry May	United States	The 188-gross register ton schooner was stranded at Apple River, Nova Scotia. All five people on board survived.

=== 15 May ===
List of shipwrecks: 15 May 1912
Ship	State	Description
Annie M. Nixon	United States	The motor schooner was wrecked in Dixon Entrance in Southeast Alaska. She became a total loss.

=== 20 May ===
List of shipwrecks: 20 May 1912
Ship	State	Description
Armeria	United States Lighthouse Service	The lighthouse tender was wrecked on an uncharted rock while tending the Cape Hinchinbrook Light. She was declared a total loss and the wreck was sold.
Frances	United States	The 93-gross register ton screw steamer burned at Cairo, Illinois. All five people on board survived.

=== 21 May ===
List of shipwrecks: 21 May 1912
Ship	State	Description
Lord Lansdowne	United Kingdom	The cargo ship was wrecked on Cobbler's Reef, Barbados. She was on a voyage from Norfolk, Virginia, United States to Barbados.

=== 24 May ===
List of shipwrecks: 24 May 1912
Ship	State	Description
Lucile	United States	The 65-gross register ton sternwheel paddle steamer foundered in the Yazoo River in Mississippi. All 27 people on board survived.

=== 29 May ===
List of shipwrecks: 29 May 1912
Ship	State	Description
Fannie	United States	The 14-gross register ton screw steamer burned on Buffalo Bayou in Texas. All four people on board survived.

=== Unknown date ===
List of shipwrecks: Unknown date May 1912
Ship	State	Description
USLHT Armeria	United States Lighthouse Service	USLHT Armeria aground. She flies the United States flag upside down as a distress signal. The 1,502-displacement ton lighthouse tender was wrecked on an uncharted submerged rock off the south-central coast of the District of Alaska either on 15 May on the southern tip of Montgaue Island while rescuing the sole survivor of the barge Haydn Brown (United States) or on 20 May off of Cape Hinchinbrook Light near the southern end of Hinchinbrook Island adjacent to Prince William Sound while landing supplies. All 37 people aboard – her crew of 36 plus the lone survivor of Haydn Brown – survived and were rescued up by the steamer Admiral Sampson (United States).
Haydn Brown	United States	Under tow by the tug Pioneer (United States) from Akutan on Akutan Island in the Aleutian Islands to Gypsum, District of Alaska, and Seattle, Washington, with a crew of six, two stowaways, and a cargo of 30 tons of coal aboard but cut loose by Pioneer off Cape Saint Elias on Kayak Island on the south-central coast of the District of Alaska during a storm on either 10 or 16 May, the 864-gross register ton 162-foot (49.4 m) barge, a converted bark, drifted onto rocks at the southern tip of Montague Island and was wrecked on either 12 or 18 May with the loss of both stowaways and five members of her crew. The lighthouse tender USLHT Armeria ( United States Lighthouse Service) rescued her sole survivor.
USS Pensacola	United States Navy	The decommissioned screw steamer was burned and sunk in San Francisco Bay off Hunter's Point, San Francisco, California, by the United States Navy in early May as a means of disposal.
Semendar	Ottoman Navy	Italo-Turkish War: The minelaying naval tugboat was sunk by mines in the Dardanelles in the middle of the month.

== June ==
=== 2 June ===
List of shipwrecks: 2 June 1912
Ship	State	Description
Friendship	New South Wales	Friendship aground in June 1912. The cargo ship ran aground at Tweed Heads, New South Wales, Australia. She was refloated, repaired, and returned to service.

=== 4 June ===
List of shipwrecks: 4 June 1912
Ship	State	Description
George Curtis	United States	The fishing steamer stranded on Long Island, New York, near the Ditch Plain Life-Saving Station.

=== 8 June ===
List of shipwrecks: 8 June 1912
Ship	State	Description
Gertrude Summers	United States	The 64-gross register ton schooner foundered in the Gulf of Mexico. All 15 people on board survived.
Vendémiaire	French Navy	The Pluviôse-class submarine was rammed near Cherbourg by the battleship Saint Louis (French Navy) and sank with the loss of twenty-five sailors.

=== 9 June ===
List of shipwrecks: 9 June 1912
Ship	State	Description
Judge Pennewill	United States	The 439-gross register ton schooner foundered off Charleston, South Carolina. All seven people on board survived.

=== 12 June ===
List of shipwrecks: 12 June 1912
Ship	State	Description
Nelson C. Smith	United States	The 35-gross register ton motor vessel burned at Port Monmouth, New Jersey. All nine people on board survived.

=== 13 June ===
List of shipwrecks: 13 June 1912
Ship	State	Description
Laclabell	United States	The 12-gross register ton, 41.3-foot (12.6 m) motor passenger vessel sank 1.5 nautical miles (2.8 km; 1.7 mi) west of Guard Island in Southeast Alaska.

=== 14 June ===
List of shipwrecks: 14 June 1912
Ship	State	Description
Precurser	United States	The 57-gross register ton screw steamer burned at Port Jefferson, New York. All four people on board survived.

=== 17 June ===
List of shipwrecks: 17 June 1912
Ship	State	Description
Imperial	United States	The 494-gross register ton sternwheel paddle steamer burned at New Orleans, Louisiana. The only person on board survived.

=== 20 June ===
List of shipwrecks: 20 June 1912
Ship	State	Description
La Canadienne	Canada	The hydrographic survey ship was sunk in Lock No. 22 in the Welland Canal when a handling line parted and she crashed into the upper gate. Two men on shore were drowned when the gate gave way causing a large wave that swept them away. The vessel was raised on 25 June and taken to Port Dalhousie, Ontario, for repairs. Returned to service by 28 July.

=== 21 June ===
List of shipwrecks: 21 June 1912
Ship	State	Description
Anna Kenney	United States	The 103-gross register ton canal boat foundered in the Hudson River 4 miles (6.4 km) south of Poughkeepsie, New York. The only person on board survived.

=== 24 June ===
List of shipwrecks: 24 June 1912
Ship	State	Description
Long Island City	United States	The barge sank at the wharf of the Sealshipt Oyster Company, East Providence, Rhode Island. Raised, repaired and returned to service.
Stone Harbor	United States	The 10-gross register ton motor vessel burned at Stone Harbor, New Jersey. All 14 people on board survived.

=== 25 June ===
List of shipwrecks: 25 June 1912
Ship	State	Description
Dredge #4	United States	The dredge was sunk in a collision with an unknown steamer in the St. Croix River three miles (4.8 km) below Calais, Maine. Later raised.
Unknown scow	United States	The scow caught fire at dock in the East River near One hundred and seventh Street, New York City. Her mooring lines burned through and she drifted out into the river fully involved. Two men on board were forced overboard by the fire and were rescued from the water by two New York City Police Department officers who later received the United States Life Saving Service's Life saving Medal.

=== 26 June ===
List of shipwrecks: 26 June 1912
Ship	State	Description
Naniwa	Imperial Japanese Navy	The Naniwa-class protected cruiser was wrecked on the coast of Uruppu (46°30′N 150°10′E) in the Kurile Islands.

=== 27 June ===
List of shipwrecks: 27 June 1912
Ship	State	Description
Sydney C. McLouth	United States	The 2,220-gross register ton screw steamer burned on Green Bay 8 nautical miles (15 km; 9.2 mi) northeast of Pensaukee, Wisconsin. All 15 people on board survived.

=== 28 June ===
List of shipwrecks: 28 June 1912
Ship	State	Description
W. R. Todd	United States	The 172-gross register ton sternwheel paddle steamer was lost when she struck a bridge on the Columbia River at Pasco, Washington. All 13 people on board survived.

=== 29 June ===
List of shipwrecks: 29 June 1912
Ship	State	Description
Ranger	United States	The 24-gross register ton schooner foundered in Vineyard Sound off Gay Head, Massachusetts. All 10 people on board survived.

== July ==
=== 11 July ===
List of shipwrecks: 11 July 1912
Ship	State	Description
Frances Elizabeth	United States	An explosion destroyed the 30-gross register ton schooner at Southport, North Carolina. The only person on board died.

=== 13 July ===
List of shipwrecks: 13 July 1912
Ship	State	Description
Geneva	United States	The 874-gross register ton schooner was stranded on Itaparica Island on the coast of Brazil. All nine people on board survived.
Town Harbor	United States	The motor boat sank at the wharf of the Sealshipt Oyster Company, Bridgeport, Connecticut. Raised, repaired and returned to service.

=== 17 July ===
List of shipwrecks: 17 July 1912
Ship	State	Description
Compeer	United States	The 347-gross register ton, 140.5-foot (42.8 m) three-masted schooner was wrecked at Cape Chichagof (58°20′N 157°32′W) near Egegik on the Bristol Bay coast of the District of Alaska. All 30 people aboard survived.

=== 18 July ===
List of shipwrecks: 18 July 1912
Ship	State	Description
Pioneer	United States	The motor launch sank at Port Wells (60°48′N 148°14′W) in the District of Alaska.

=== 21 July ===
List of shipwrecks: 21 July 1912
Ship	State	Description
Clara E. Comee	United States	With no one on board, the 138-gross register ton schooner foundered in the Providence River in Rhode Island, or in the harbor at Providence, Rhode Island. As the owners abandoned the vessel, the U.S. Army Corps of Engineers office had to provide for her removal. The salvage company, the Scott Company, retained the schooner for its own use after raising her.

=== 24 July ===
List of shipwrecks: 24 July 1912
Ship	State	Description
C. W. Seward	United States	The 18-gross register ton schooner was lost in a collision with the screw steamer City of Norfolk (United States) in the Chesapeake Bay with the loss of one life. There was one survivor.

=== Unknown date ===
List of shipwrecks: Unknown date 1912
Ship	State	Description
Transporter	United Kingdom	The North Shields ship in ballast from St Nazaire to the Tyne for coal went ashore in thick fog, to the south of Mousehole, Cornwall. The salvage steamer Lady of the Isles hauled her clear and she resumed her journey undamaged.

== August ==
=== 7 August ===
List of shipwrecks: 7 August 1912
Ship	State	Description
Machado 2°	Portugal	The 204-gross register ton trawler was stranded 15 miles (24 km) north of Mogador, Morocco while fishing.

=== 8 August ===
List of shipwrecks: 8 August 1912
Ship	State	Description
Chancellor	United Kingdom	The 105.6-foot (32.2 m), 168-ton steam trawler stranded at Duncansby Head. Refloated on 10 August.
G W Wolff	United Kingdom	The full-rigged ship was wrecked on Prime Seal Island, Tasmania with the loss of her captain.
HMS Holland 5	Royal Navy	The decommissioned Holland-class submarine sank in the English Channel off Beachy Head while under tow to the breaker's yard.

=== 12 August ===
List of shipwrecks: 12 August 1912
Ship	State	Description
Norumbega	United States	The steamer stranded on Clarks Point, Southwest Harbor, Maine.

=== 17 August ===
List of shipwrecks: 17 August 1912
Ship	State	Description
Leafield	Canada	The cargo ship ran aground on a rocky islet in Georgian Bay near Beausoleil Island, Ontario, Canada. She was refloated and repaired, and she returned to service about two months later.
Newport	United States	The steamer was buried in a landslide in the Panama Canal. It took two months to dig her out, then she was repaired and returned to service.

=== 19 August ===
List of shipwrecks: 19 August 1912
Ship	State	Description
Addie Fuller	United States	The 217-gross register ton schooner was stranded on Cutler Head on the coast of Maine. All five people on board survived.

=== 21 August ===
List of shipwrecks: 21 August 1912
Ship	State	Description
Alianza	United States	The 6-gross register ton schooner foundered off Jacaboa, Puerto Rico, with the loss of one life. There were three survivors.

=== 23 August ===
List of shipwrecks: 23 August 1912
Ship	State	Description
Falcon	United States	The fishing steamer sank near Shovelful Shoal Lightship off Cape Cod, Massachusetts, after colliding with the fishing steamer Amagansett (United States) near Handkerchief Shoal, south of Chatham, Massachusetts.

=== 26 August ===
List of shipwrecks: 26 August 1912
Ship	State	Description
Marnix	Belgium	Struck uncharted rocks at Umba, Russia (66°21′N 35°36′E) and wrecked.

=== 29 August ===
List of shipwrecks: 29 August 1912
Ship	State	Description
Florida	United States	The Barge was sunk in a collision in Hampton Roads off Fort Wool. Wreck removal finished 18 July 1913.

=== 31 August ===
List of shipwrecks: 31 August 1912
Ship	State	Description
Kursk	Denmark	Ran aground in a storm at Ouddorp, Netherlands. Thirty-two people killed.

=== Unknown date ===
List of shipwrecks: Unknown date August 1912
Ship	State	Description
Seneca	United States	The barge went ashore on Shelter Island, New York, sometime in August.

== September ==
=== 1 September ===
List of shipwrecks: 1 September 1912
Ship	State	Description
HMS Waterwitch	Royal Navy	HMS Waterwitch The Admiralty survey vessel sank after she was rammed by the governor's launch while anchored in Singapore Harbour.

=== 3 September ===
List of shipwrecks: 3 September 1912
Ship	State	Description
HMS Holland 4	Royal Navy	The decommissioned Holland-class submarine foundered while under tow. She was salvaged for use as a gunnery target.

=== 5 September ===
List of shipwrecks: 5 September 1912
Ship	State	Description
Anna I. Gale	United States	The 38-gross register ton schooner was stranded in the Chesapeake Bay at Sandy Point on the coast of Maryland. All three people on board survived.
Esperance	France	The schooner capsized in the Bristol Channel. Her five crew and the ship's dog were rescued by the trawler Picton Castle (United Kingdom). Esperance was on a voyage from Boulogne, Pas-de-Calais to Swansea, Glamorgan, United Kingdom.

=== 10 September ===
List of shipwrecks: 10 September 1912
Ship	State	Description
Endeavor	United States	The 565-gross register ton schooner was stranded on Agna Reef in the Fiji Islands with the loss of one life. There were eight survivors.

=== 13 September ===
List of shipwrecks: 13 September 1912
Ship	State	Description
Scow #2	United States	The scow sank at Belle Dock, New Haven, Connecticut.

=== 14 September ===
List of shipwrecks: 14 September 1912
Ship	State	Description
SMS G171	Imperial German Navy	The G169-class torpedo boat was sunk in a collision with SMS Zähringen (Imperial German Navy) in the North Sea. Seven crewmen killed.
K-8	United States	The scow sank in Canal Channel near Onset, Massachusetts.

=== 21 September ===
List of shipwrecks: 21 September 1912
Ship	State	Description
Calabria	Canada	The schooner went ashore on Fishers Island, New York.

=== 26 September ===
List of shipwrecks: 26 September 1912
Ship	State	Description
Volturno	United Kingdom	The cargo ship was sunk in a collision in Hull Roads. Raised and scrapped at Briton Ferry on 25 October.

=== 28 September ===
List of shipwrecks: 28 September 1912
Ship	State	Description
F. A. Smith	United States	The schooner sank in Broad Sound near Deer Island, Massachusetts.
Kiche Maru	Japan	The steam passenger ship sank off the coast of Japan during a typhoon with over 1,000 dead.

== October ==
=== 4 October ===
List of shipwrecks: 4 October 1912
Ship	State	Description
Addie M. Story	United States	The 61-gross register ton schooner was stranded at Rocky Harbour on the coast of Newfoundland. All six people on board survived.
HMS B2	Royal Navy	The B-class submarine collided with the passenger liner Amerika (Germany) while surfacing in the North Sea northeast of Dover, England, and sank with the loss of 14 of her crew of 15.

=== 5 October ===
List of shipwrecks: 5 October 1912
Ship	State	Description
Henry Weiler	United States	The 400-gross register ton schooner was abandoned in the Atlantic Ocean at 33°50′N 075°35′W. All seven people on board survived.

=== 7 October ===
List of shipwrecks: 7 October 1912
Ship	State	Description
Charles A. Campbell	United States	The schooner ran ashore on Cape Cod near Nauset, Massachusetts.

=== 12 October ===
List of shipwrecks: 12 October 1912
Ship	State	Description
John B. Dallas	United States	The canal boat was run ashore near Quonochontaug, Rhode Island, to prevent her sinking. Her cargo of coal and her boiler were salvaged.

=== 13 October ===
List of shipwrecks: 13 October 1912
Ship	State	Description
Advent	United States	The 548-gross register ton schooner was lost in a collision with the screw steamer St. Helens (United States) in the Pacific Ocean 10 nautical miles (19 km; 12 mi) off Fort Bragg, California. All nine people on board survived.

=== 16 October ===
List of shipwrecks: 16 October 1912
Ship	State	Description
Andrew Johnson	United States	The 13-gross register ton schooner was lost in a collision with the schooner Bessie Reed (United States) in Baltimore Harbor off the coast of Maryland. Both people on board survived.
Nicaragua	United States	The wreck of SS Nicaragua on Padre Island in June 1913. The cargo ship was wrecked on Padre Island, Texas, during a storm in the Gulf of Mexico.
Ralph Creyke	United Kingdom	The Ouse Steamship Company passenger-cargo ship sank near Flushing after a collision with the steamer Viking (Denmark).

=== 19 October ===
List of shipwrecks: 19 October 1912
Ship	State	Description
J. J. Loggie	United States	The 220-gross register ton lumber schooner was wrecked on rocks one mile (1.6 km) south of Point Argello, California. 18 crew were rescued; one seaman swept overboard managed to reach shore alive but badly cut and bruised. J. J. Loggie was wrecked on the same place that the steamer Santa Rosa had been wrecked a year before.

=== 20 October ===
List of shipwrecks: 22 October 1912
Ship	State	Description
No. 9 and No. 10	Ottoman Navy	Italo-Turkish War: The No. 1-class motor gunboats were lost on this date.

=== 23 October ===
List of shipwrecks: 23 October 1912
Ship	State	Description
Oakland	United States	Shortly after departing Dry Bay (59°08′N 138°25′W) in Southeast Alaska bound for Seattle, Washington, with a cargo of 25 tons of canned salmon and supplies and a deck load of empty oil drums, the 146-gross register ton, 103-foot (31.4 m) steamer was wrecked at the entrance of Dry Bay in a gale and snowstorm. Her entire crew of 11 survived.

=== 24 October ===
List of shipwrecks: 24 October 1912
Ship	State	Description
Crown	United States	The 9-gross register ton sloop was abandoned in the Atlantic Ocean east of the North Carolina–Virginia border at 36°35′N 075°11′W. Both people on board survived.

=== 29 October ===
List of shipwrecks: 29 October 1912
Ship	State	Description
Corsair	United States	Carrying a crew of two and a 14-ton cargo of general wares, the 15.74-ton, 53.8-foot (16.4 m) steamer ran aground during a gale at Point Martin (60°10′N 144°36′W) near Katalla, Territory of Alaska, and was destroyed by a subsequent fire. Her captain survived; her engineer perished.
Nashua	United States	The barge sank near the Wilkes-Barre Pier, Providence, Rhode Island. Raised and broken up.

=== 31 October ===
List of shipwrecks: 31 October 1912
Ship	State	Description
Feth-i Bülend	Ottoman Navy	First Balkan War: The accommodation hulk, a former Feth-i Bülend-class ironclad coast defense vessel, was torpedoed and sunk in Thessaloniki harbour by NF-11 (Hellenic Navy). Seven crew members died in the sinking.
Teleorman	Royal Romanian Navy	The longboat Teleorman sank in the Danube River. 44 soldiers died.

=== Unknown date ===
List of shipwrecks: Unknown date October 1912
Ship	State	Description
Admiral Lazarev	Imperial Russian Navy	The Admiral Lazarev-class monitor foundered in the Baltic Sea whilst under tow to Germany for scrapping.
Unnamed	United States	The scow sank in Massachusetts Bay sometime in October.

== November ==
=== 1 November ===
List of shipwrecks: 1 November 1912
Ship	State	Description
Arion	United States	The yacht burned and sank near Manchester, Massachusetts. Items were salvaged from the wreck.
Arrow	United States	The 30-gross register ton schooner was stranded at Cordory, Newfoundland. All four people on board survived.
Sesnon #13	United States	The 24-ton barge sank with no loss of life at Nome, Territory of Alaska.

=== 6 November ===
List of shipwrecks: 6 November 1912
Ship	State	Description
Hattie Wells	United States	The 376-gross register ton schooner foundered in Lake Michigan. All six people on board survived.
Royal George	United Kingdom	The ocean liner ran aground nine miles (14 km) below Quebec City, Quebec. Refloated on 23 November, repaired and returned to service.

=== 7 November ===
List of shipwrecks: 7 November 1912
Ship	State	Description
Monarch	United States	The Tug was wrecked on a shoal at the entrance to the Harbor of Charlotte Harbor, Florida, eventually breaking up. A 100 foot section of her starboard hull drifted to where it was a hazard to navigation. The section was blown loose, dragged ashore and burned 24–31 July 1913.

=== 8 November ===
List of shipwrecks: 8 November 1912
Ship	State	Description
De Mory Gray	United States	The 401-gross register ton schooner was stranded in Northport Bay on the coast of Long Island, New York. All seven people on board survived.
Hustler	United States	The 13-gross register ton schooner burned on Lake Michigan. Both people on board survived.

=== 10 November ===
List of shipwrecks: 10 November 1912
Ship	State	Description
Seddulbahir	Ottoman Navy	First Balkan War: The Taskopru-class gunboat was sunk by a Greek torpedo boat at Avila, north of Smyrna.

=== 12 November ===
List of shipwrecks: 12 November 1912
Ship	State	Description
E. K. Wood	United States	The 519-gross register ton schooner was stranded on Barrier Island, British Columbia, Canada. All nine people on board survived.
Oravia	United Kingdom	Oravia The passenger ship ran aground off Port Stanley, Falkland Islands. She was abandoned on 16 November. Oravia was on a voyage from Liverpool, Lancashire to Callao, Peru.

=== 13 November ===
List of shipwrecks: 13 November 1912
Ship	State	Description
Estelle	United States	The schooner ran ashore on Fishers Island, New York, after mistaking the beacon lights of the stranded schooner Maggie Ellen (United States) for those of Little Gull Island and Race Rock, New York.
Maggie Ellen	United States	The schooner ran ashore on Fishers Island, New York.

=== 15 November ===
List of shipwrecks: 15 November 1912
Ship	State	Description
Harriet	United States	The tug struck a rock off Napatree Point, Rhode Island. Refloated and returned to service.
Hersilia	Germany	The cargo vessel stranded near Porto and was lost.

=== 21 November ===
List of shipwrecks: 21 November 1912
Ship	State	Description
Balloon	United States	The barge sank near Duck Island, Connecticut.

=== 23 November ===
List of shipwrecks: 23 November 1912
Ship	State	Description
Gypsum Emperor	United States	The schooner went ashore on Bonnet Point near Saunderstown, Rhode Island. Refloated and returned to service.
Rouse Simmons	United States	Sonar image of the wreck of Rouse Simmons, 12 June 2022. During a voyage from Thompson, Michigan, to Chicago, Illinois, with a cargo of Christmas trees, the 123-foot-6-inch (38 m), 205.26-gross register ton three-masted schooner disappeared with the loss of all 16 passengers and crew off Two Rivers, Wisconsin, during a storm on Lake Michigan. Her wreck was discovered in 1971 in 165 feet (50 m) of water 12 nautical miles (22 km; 14 mi) northeast of Two Rivers. In 2021, it was included within the boundaries of the Wisconsin Shipwreck Coast National Marine Sanctuary.

=== 24 November ===
List of shipwrecks: 24 November 1912
Ship	State	Description
Pioneer	United States	The barge stranded near Point Judith, Rhode Island. The vessel broke up before salvage could take place.
Typhoon	United States	The barge stranded near Point Judith, Rhode Island. Refloated and returned to service.

=== 25 November ===
List of shipwrecks: 25 November 1912
Ship	State	Description
Hortensia	United States	The schooner went ashore on Savin Rock near New Haven, Connecticut.

=== 28 November ===
List of shipwrecks: 28 November 1912
Ship	State	Description
Friendship	Australia	The cargo ship ran aground and sank at the entrance to the Tweed River at Tweed Heads, New South Wales, Australia. There were no injuries or fatalities among her crew.

=== Unknown date ===
List of shipwrecks: Unknown date November 1912
Ship	State	Description
Chief No. 2	United States	The barge sank off the end of Arrietta Street, Staten Island. Raised in June 1914.

== December ==
=== 3 December ===
List of shipwrecks: 3 December 1912
Ship	State	Description
West Point	United States	The barge sank near the dock of Pardie and Young, Fall River, Massachusetts. The vessel's cargo was salvaged.

=== 6 December ===
List of shipwrecks: 6 December 1912
Ship	State	Description
Bessie C. Beach	United States	The 341-gross register ton schooner was stranded at Nepeague Beach on Long Island, New York. All six people on board survived.

=== 7 December ===
List of shipwrecks: 7 December 1912
Ship	State	Description
Lena	United States	The launch was lost off Grassy Island (60°55′20″N 147°37′00″W) between Galena Bay (60.9417°N 146.6986°W) and Jack Bay (61.0427°N 146.6465°W) on the south-central coast of the Territory of Alaska with the loss of two crewmen. Her captain survived.
Uncle Sam	United States	The 24-gross register ton, 25-foot (7.6 m) steamer was wrecked in the harbor at Seward, Territory of Alaska. No one was aboard her at the time.

=== 8 December ===
List of shipwrecks: 8 December 1912
Ship	State	Description
Antonios	Greece	The steamer was lost on rocks known as Old Bess, within the Isles of Scilly, United Kingdom. Her crew was lost and the wreck went unnoticed for three days when thousands of oranges were washed up on St Agnes along with wreckage.

=== 15 December ===
List of shipwrecks: 15 December 1912
Ship	State	Description
S. O. Co. No. 87	United States	The tanker barge's towline parted from her tow ship, Perfection (flag unknown), in a severe gale in the Gulf of Mexico between Tampico, Tamaulipas, and Sabine, Texas, on 12 December. By the time Perfection could reach her she had capsized and her crew of nine lost. She sank on 15 December.

=== 20 December ===
List of shipwrecks: 20 December 1912
Ship	State	Description
L. Herbert Taft	United States	The Schooner was wrecked on Romer shoal, lower New York Bay. Masts fell in Winter of 1913/1914. Probably wreck removed in 1914.

=== 21 December ===
List of shipwrecks: 21 December 1912
Ship	State	Description
Conquest	United States	The fishing smack went ashore near Orient, New York.

=== 23 December ===
List of shipwrecks: 23 December 1912
Ship	State	Description
Golden Fleece	United States	The 47-gross register ton schooner burned at Warm Springs Landing in California. Both people on board survived.

=== 24 December ===
List of shipwrecks: 24 December 1912
Ship	State	Description
786	United States	The barge, under tow of Lehigh (United States), went ashore on Bartletts Reef, New London, Connecticut.
791	United States	The barge, under tow of Lehigh (United States), went ashore on Bartletts Reef, New London, Connecticut.
Lehigh	United States	The tug went ashore on Bartletts Reef, New London, Connecticut.

=== 26 December ===
List of shipwrecks: 26 December 1912
Ship	State	Description
Tripolitania	United Kingdom	The vessel was wrecked on Loe Bar, near Porthleven, Cornwall in 100 mph (161 km/h) winds. Nearly all the crew were saved but the ship was a total loss.

=== 29 December ===
List of shipwrecks: 29 December 1912
Ship	State	Description
Britannic	United Kingdom	The 119-foot (36 m) trawler was rammed and sunk by trawler "Buzzard" (United Kingdom) with the loss of her Captain. Survivors rescued by trawlers "Viceroy" (5), "Kite" (2), and "Tanager" (1) all (United Kingdom).

=== 30 December ===
List of shipwrecks: 30 December 1912
Ship	State	Description
Vigilant	United Kingdom	The ship was driven ashore at Breaksea Point, Glamorgan. Her seven crew were rescued.

=== Unknown date ===
List of shipwrecks: Unknown date December 1912
Ship	State	Description
Margaret Ann	United States	The schooner was blown ashore on a mud flat near the mouth of the Yellow Mill Channel at Bridgeport, Connecticut, sometime in December and abandoned by the owners. In July/August 1913 she was raised, moved out of the way of traffic and resunk.
Therese Horn	Germany	The cargo vessel departed Port Arthur for Rotterdam on 26 December and vanished.

== Unknown date ==
List of shipwrecks: Unknown date 1912
Ship	State	Description
City of Adelaide	Australia	The coal storage hulk was burned out by a several-day-long fire at Townsville, Australia.
Emily F. Whitman	United States	The schooner was lost at Nushagak in either the District or Territory of Alaska.
USS Ericsson	United States Navy	The decommissioned torpedo boat was sunk as a target in ordnance tests.
Fox	United Kingdom	The steamer was wrecked on the coast of Greenland.
Pelayo	Spanish Navy	The battleship was badly damaged in Fonduko Bay due to a navigational error.
