= Vaucluse (ferry) =

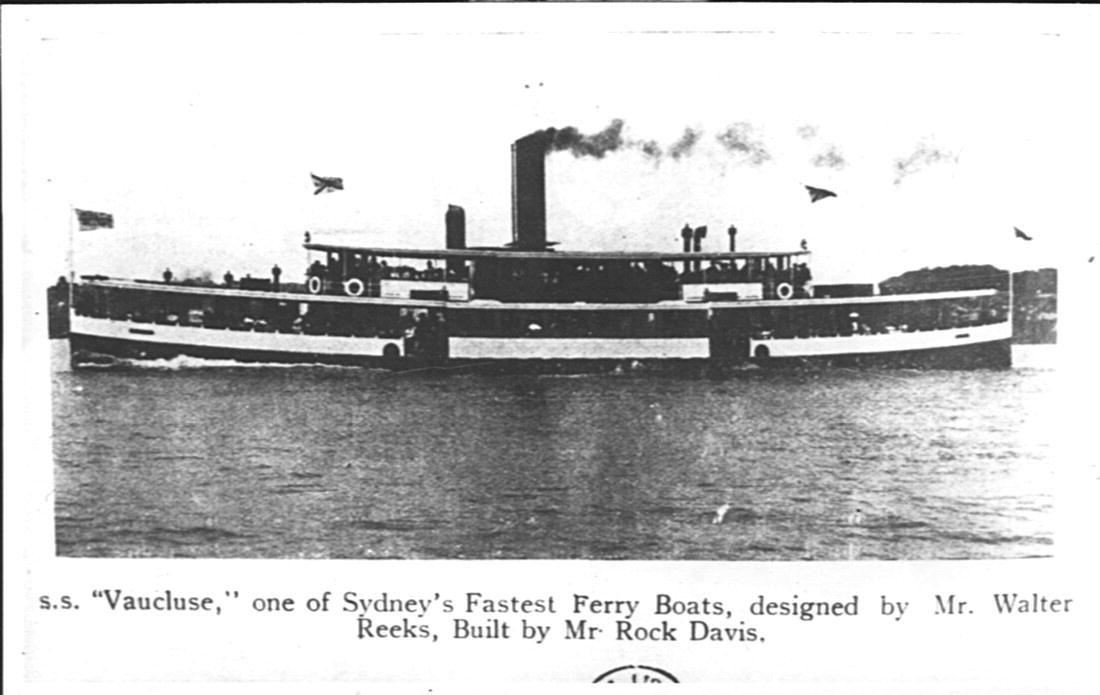

History
- Name: Vaucluse
- Operator: Watsons Bay and South Shore Ferry Company; Sydney Ferries Limited (from 1920)
- Builder: Rock Davis, Blackwall
- Launched: 1905
- Out of service: 1931
- Fate: to Newcastle

General characteristics
- Tonnage: 121 tonnes
- Length: 42.5 m
- Speed: 14 knots
- Capacity: 500

Vaucluse was a ferry on Sydney Harbour that served on the Circular Quay to Watsons Bay run. She was launched in 1905, and was one of the fastest ferries in Sydney. She was sent to Newcastle after which her fate is unknown. She was named after the Sydney suburb, Vaucluse.

== Background ==
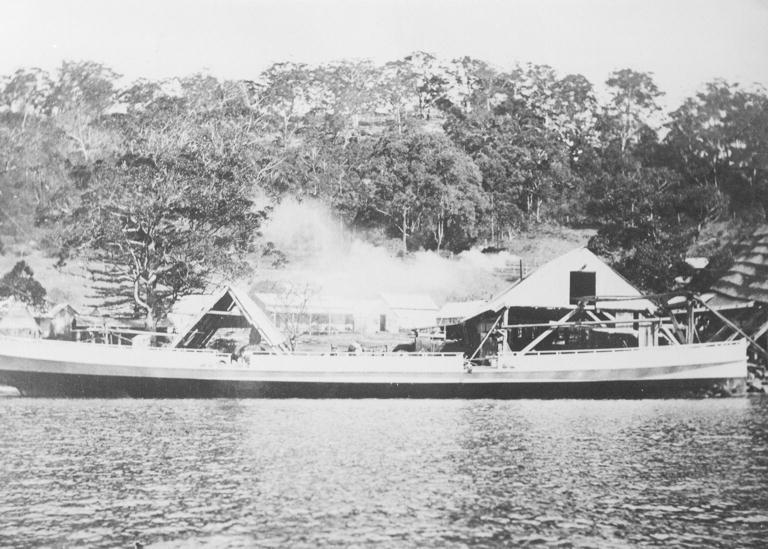
Hull at Blackwall, Brisbane Waters soon after launch, 1905

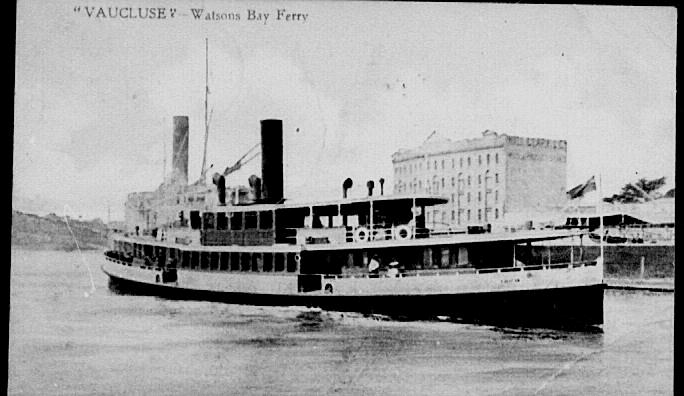
Arriving at Circular Quay

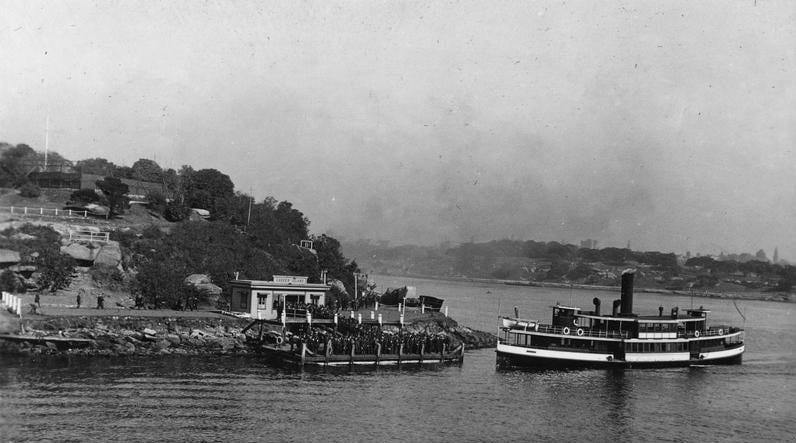
At Garden Island after wheelhouses attached

In 1790, a signal station was established at South Head and ships' boats were used to carry passengers and cargo to the area. As the Watsons Bay and Vaucluse areas grew, Edye Manning provided a ferry to local hotel and picnic grounds. In 1876, a regular service was in place and run by W Harmer until 1881 with Golden Rose and Swansea and by 1884 three competing companies were running ferries to the area including Golden Rose, Swansea, Coombra, Phantom and Victor. Two of the companies combined in 1887 into the Watsons Bay and South Shore Steam Ferry Co Ltd, which in 1912 became the Watsons Bay and South Shore Ferry Co Ltd.

The company bought Bald Rock from the Balmain Company in 1900 and renamed it Vaucluse until a new boat of the same name was built. She was sold back to the Balmain Company and was reverted to Bald Rock in 1905 when Vaucluse (II) was introduced. King Edward had joined the fleet in 1901, and the company commissioned Greycliffe in 1911 and Woollahra in 1913. The latter was delivered with high bows and raised wheelhouses having been intended for a short-lived Manly to Watsons Bay service.

== Service history ==
The Watsons Bay and South Shore Ferry Company commissioned the naval architect Walter Reeks to design a new vessel, Vaucluse, his first double-ended screw steamer. She was built in 1905 by Rock Davis in Blackwall (Brisbane Water). The 121 ton, timber-hulled ferry could carry 500 passengers, and had a 70 hp steam engine by Chapman & Co. Ltd. This pushed her to bursts of 15 knots, which made her one of the fastest ferries on the harbour and ideal for the long run from Circular Quay to Watsons Bay. She carried a brass rooster on her jackmast to identify her as the fastest boat on the harbour, and was said to overtake larger Manly ferries on their way to Manly. However, she was expensive to run.

On a 5:35 pm service from Circular Quay on 4 October 1916 with 100 passengers aboard, Vaucluse collided with the Royal Australian Navy steam yacht, Franklin. Rounding Bennelong Point and heading to Garden Island, she headed into a blinding rain squall. Franklin was travelling the other way up the harbour and her sharp bow cut halfway through the ferry. As the boats separated, water rushed into Vaucluse and she began to sink. The passing Mosman ferry, Kirawa, was able to tow her to Garden Island where she was made fast. Vaucluse was kept a float using the dock's fire engine pumps, and the fireboat Hydra came with more powerful pumps. Two passengers were injured and the remainder were to their destination by Greycliffe.

Vaucluse was taken over by Sydney Ferries Limited in 1920 when they bought out the Watsons Bay and South Shore Ferry Company. Three running mates, King Edward, Greycliffe, and Woollahra, were also included in the take over and the company's other ferries were sold. Greycliffe was sunk and 40 passengers killed in a 1927 collision with the liner Tahiti.

With the Watsons Bay run declining for much of the 1920s due to competition from trams and private cars, Woollahra and Vaucluse were sold in 1931, the latter to the Employees' Welfare Committee of the Walsh Island Dockyard & Engineering Works in Newcastle, where she carried workers from Newcastle to the dockyard prior to its closure in 1933. Vaucluse survived a storm in September 1934 but her fate after this is unknown. The Watsons Bay service was abandoned on 31 July 1933. King Edward was sold in 1934 and Woollahra was used on other routes until 1934.
