= SS Friendship =

Australian cargo ship

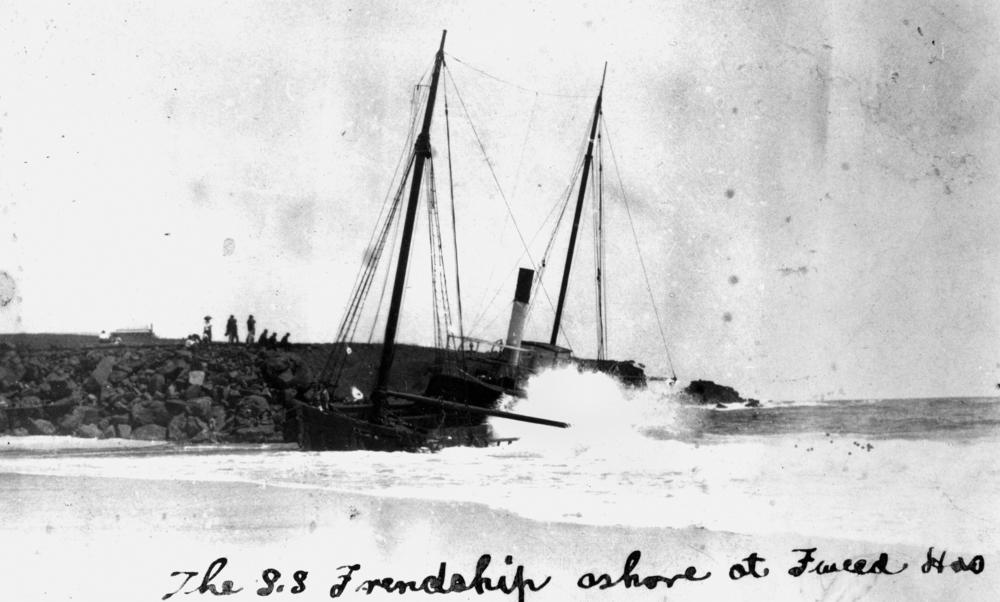
- Friendship ashore off Tweeds Heads in June 1912 .

History
- Name: SS Friendship
- Owner: Corrigan, B.M. & Co.
- Port of registry: Sydney, Australia
- Builder: Rock Davis, Blackwall, N.S.W.
- Completed: 1897
- Maiden voyage: 1897
- In service: 1897
- Identification: Official number: 106139
- Fate: Wrecked 28 November 1912

General characteristics
- Type: Cargo ship
- Tonnage: 214 GRT
- Length: 30.8 metres (101 ft 1 in)
- Beam: 8.2 metres (26 ft 11 in)
- Depth: 2.5 metres (8 ft 2 in)
- Installed power: compound engine
- Propulsion: Screw propeller

SS Friendship was an Australian cargo ship which ran aground and sank at Tweed Heads, New South Wales, Australia, at the end of South Wall during a voyage from the Tweed River to Sydney, Australia.

== Construction ==
Friendship was constructed in 1897 at the Rock Davis shipyard, at Blackwall, on Brisbane Water. She was 30.8 metres (101 ft 1 in) long, with a beam of 8.2 metres (26 ft 11 in) and a depth of 2.5 metres (8 ft 2 in), and was assessed at 214 GRT. She had a compound engine driving a single screw propeller. She operated for Corrigan, B.M. & Co. from 1897 until her demise in 1912.

== June 1912 grounding ==
Friendship ran aground off Tweed Heads, New South Wales, on 2 June 1912. It was the first accident of her 15-year career. She was refloated a few days later and returned to service after repairs.

== Sinking ==
On 28 November 1912, Friendship left Tweed River bound for Sydney with a cargo of tallow. She had made this voyage numerous times with only one accident, the grounding the previous June. This time, however, she ran aground again at Tweed Heads at the end of South Wall. She sank, taking her cargo down with her, but there were no injuries or fatalities.

== Wreck ==
Friendship′s wreck lies at the entrance to the Tweed River on the coast of New South Wales.
