= Australian steamer Adele =

Steamer of the Royal Australian Navy

Coordinates: 34.4678°S 150.9170°E

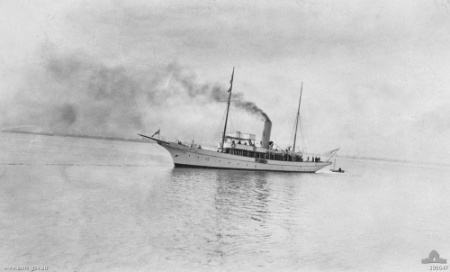
- HMAS Franklin

History
- Name: Adele (1906–1915); HMAS Franklin (1915–22); Adele (1922–39); HMAS Adele (1939–43)
- Owner: Henry Dutton ( –1915); Royal Australian Navy (1915–22); Administrator of Papua-New Guinea (1922–29); Commonwealth Government of Australia, Department of Home & Territories (1929–32); W L Buckland (1932– ); C H Relph ( –1939); Royal Australian Navy (1939–43)
- Port of registry: (United Kingdom) Australia (1907–15); (Australia) Royal Australian Navy (1915–22); Territory of New Guinea (1922–29); (United Kingdom) Port Adelaide (1929–39); (Australia) Royal Australian Navy (1939–43)
- Builder: Hawthorn & Co Leith, Scotland, United Kingdom
- Yard number: 116
- Launched: 18 October 1906
- Completed: November 1906
- Identification: UK Official Number 123022; Code Letters HJRW
- Fate: Wrecked 7 May 1943

General characteristics
- Type: Steel screw steamer
- Tonnage: 288 GRT; 131 NRT
- Length: 145 ft 0 in (44.20 m)
- Beam: 22 ft 4 in (6.81 m)
- Draught: 13 ft 2 in (4.01 m)
- Propulsion: 1 × 68 hp (51 kW) triple expansion steam engine (Hawthorns & Co Ltd, Leith)
- Sail plan: Yacht
- Speed: 12 knots (22 km/h)
- Armament: 2 × .303-in Vickers machine guns (HMAS Adele)

Adele was a steel screw steamer that was built in 1906 as a yacht. She was twice commissioned into the Royal Australian Navy (RAN), firstly as HMAS Franklin and later as HMAS Adele. She was wrecked at Port Kembla, New South Wales on 7 May 1943.

== Design and construction ==
Adele was built in 1906 by Hawthorns & Co Ltd, Leith, Scotland as yard number 116. She was launched on 18 October 1906 and completed in November 1906.

Originally built as a yacht, she was later converted to steam power.

=== Propulsion ===
By 1930, Adele was powered by a 68 horsepower (51 kW) triple expansion steam engine with cylinders of 12 inches (300 mm), 19 inches (480 mm) and 33 inches (840 mm) bore by 22 inches (560 mm) stroke. The engine was manufactured by Hawthorns & Co Ltd. Adele was capable of 12 knots (22 km/h).

=== Official Number and Code Letters ===
Official numbers were a forerunner to IMO Numbers. In 1930, Adele had the UK Official Number 123022 and used the Code Letters HJRW.

== Operational history ==
In 1915, Adele was purchased by the Australia Government for £21,500 from the estate of Henry Dutton of Kapunda, South Australia. On 14 September 1915 she was commissioned into the RAN as HMAS Franklin. HMAS Franklin served as a tender to the Royal Australian Naval College.

Franklin collided with the Sydney Harbour ferry, Vaucluse in 1916 injuring two passengers. Franklin's sharp bow smashed halfway through the wooden ferry's hull almost sinking her, however, the ferry was towed to nearby Garden Island where the dock's pumps kept her afloat.

Franklin was paid off on 31 March 1921 only to be recommissioned on 21 September.

Franklin was decommissioned on 18 September 1922 and gifted to the Administrator of Papua-New Guinea, serving there until 1929. By 1930, she had reverted to the name Adele and was owned by the Commonwealth Government of Australia and operated by the Department of Home & Territories. At the time she was homeported at Port Adelaide under the British Flag. In 1932, Adele was laid up at Rabaul. She was sold for £1,652 on 7 December of that year to W L Buckland of Melbourne, Australia who refitted her as a private yacht and used her for cruising. Adele was later sold to C H Relph of Sydney and was laid up for some years at Rose Bay Port Jackson, Sydney.

On 24 October 1939, Adele was requisitioned by the Royal Australian Navy as HMAS Adele. She was armed with two .303-in Vickers machine guns and employed as an examination vessel. From December 1941, HMAS Adele was attached to HMAS Maitland.

== Loss ==
On 7 May 1943, Adele struck the breakwater at Port Kembla and was subsequently declared a total loss. The wreck of Adele is protected under the New South Wales Heritage Act, 1977.

== Legacy ==
Franklin is remembered in the naming of two other sail training yachts associated with the RAN College:

- a yacht in the 1960s and 1970s, which took part in several Sydney to Hobart races;
- a 25 metres (82 ft) Hunter yacht acquired in 2005.
