= Blackwall, New South Wales =

Blackwall Central Coast, New South Wales
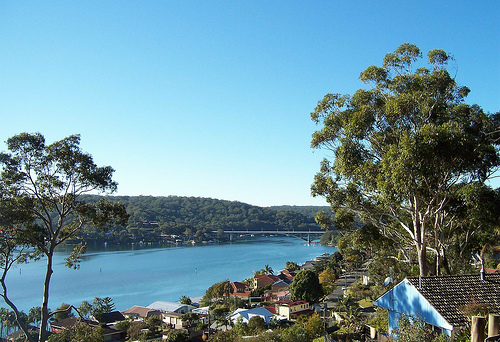
- Rip Bridge from Blackwall Mountain

- Coordinates: 33°30′20″S 151°19′55″E
- Population: 1,941 (2021 census)
  - Density: 1,620/km^{2} (4,190/sq mi)
- Postcode(s): 2256
- Elevation: 8 m (26 ft)
- Area: 1.2 km^{2} (0.5 sq mi)
- Location: 15 km (9 mi) S of Gosford; 3 km (2 mi) SSE of Woy Woy; 81 km (50 mi) from Sydney
- LGA(s): Central Coast Council
- Parish: Patonga
- State electorate(s): Gosford
- Federal division(s): Robertson
Suburbs around Blackwall:
Woy Woy	Brisbane Water	St Huberts Island
Woy Woy	Blackwall	Daleys Point
Umina Beach	Ettalong Beach	Booker Bay

Blackwall is a suburb of the Central Coast region of New South Wales, Australia, south of Woy Woy on Brisbane Water, 81 kilometres (50 mi) north of Sydney. It is part of the Central Coast Council local government area.

The suburb includes a boat ramp and a bushland recreation reserve, Kitchener Reserve, offering walk trails and views from Blackwall Mountain. The section of the suburb east of Kitchener Park is locally known as Orange Grove.

Blackwall was, between 1862 and 1913, the site of the Rock Davis shipyard, and over 120 wooden-hulled vessels were built there. Among the best known were the fast Sydney Harbour ferry, Vaucluse, built in 1905, Queen Bee, a small 'sixty-miler' built in 1907, and the small twin-screw coastal steamer, Belbowrie, built in 1911. The last vessel built there was the ferry, Woollahra.

The naming of Blackwall is credited to Rock Davis, who named it after Blackwall, London, which was also a centre of shipbuilding.
