= Maitland (1870 ship) =

Scottish-built iron paddle steamer used in Australia

Coordinates: 33.527813°S 151.394885°E

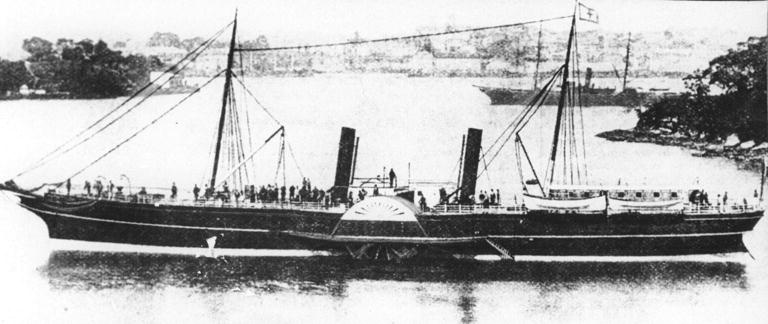

History

Australia
- Name: PSS Maitland
- Owner: Newcastle & Hunter River Steamship Co. Ltd
- Builder: McCulloch, Patterson & Co, Glen Yard 6, Port Glasgow
- Launched: 22 September 1870
- Fate: Wrecked 6 May 1898

General characteristics
- Type: Passenger ship, paddlesteamer
- Tonnage: 880 grt 550 nrt.
- Length: 231.45 ft (70.55 m)
- Beam: 27.08 ft (8.25 m)
- Draught: 19.45 ft (5.93 m)
- Propulsion: engine manufactured by McNabb & Co Greenock 250 horsepower, C2cy 410nhp 10 knots. 2 funnels
- Sail plan: two masts
- Complement: 32

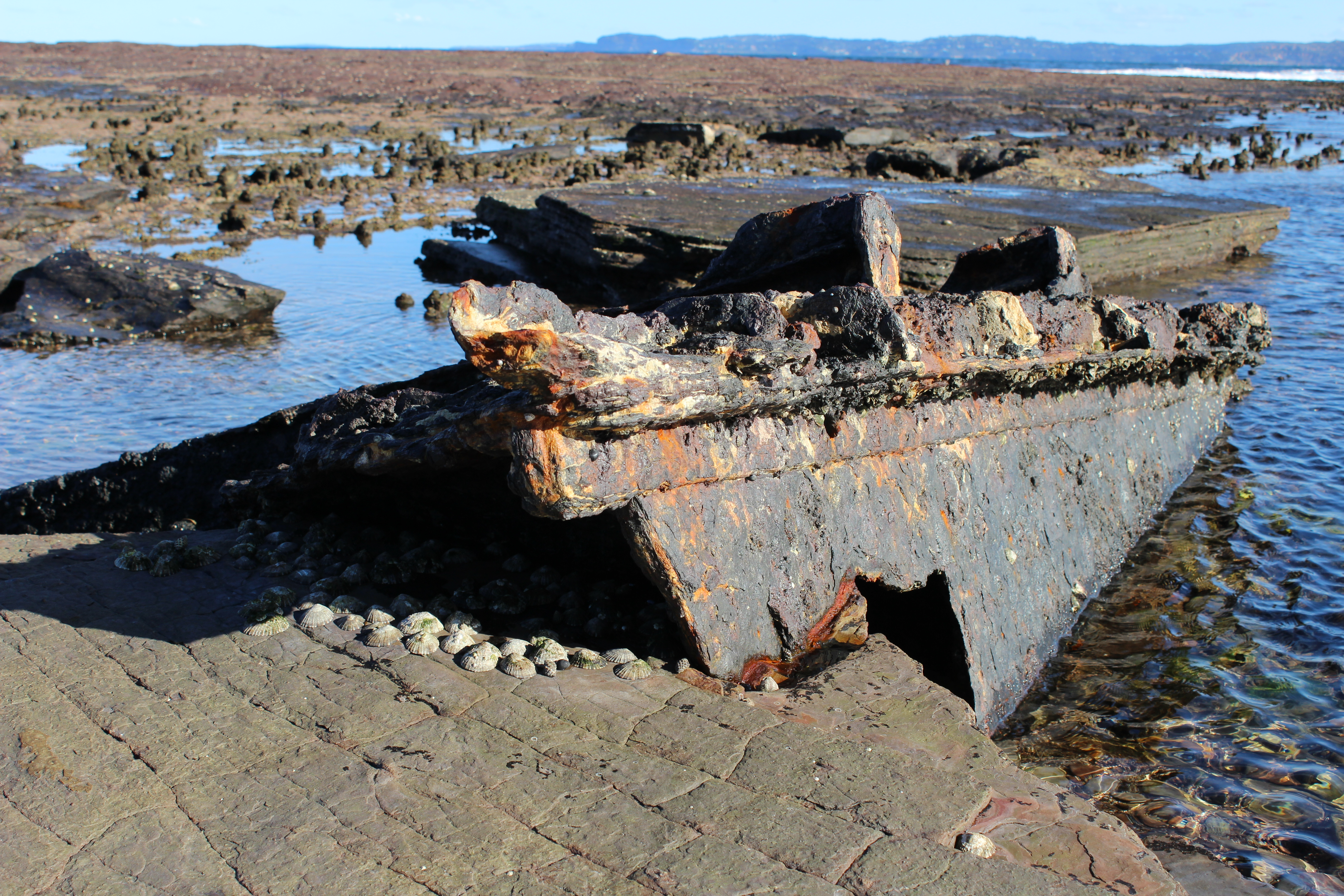
PSS Maitland wreckage at Broken Bay, Australia

PSS Maitland was a Scottish built iron paddlesteamer, used in Australia as a passenger vessel.

On the sixth of May 1898 the Maitland was wrecked at Broken Bay in a storm. On board were 32 crew including Captain Richard James Skinner and 30 passengers. One of the survivors was a baby, Daisy Hammond, who lived to the age of 90, dying in 1988. Her ashes were scattered at the wreck site. Reports suggest between 21 and 29 people were killed. The "Maitland Gale" was responsible for the wreckage of other ships. Maitland Bay was named after the shipwreck.
