= Woy Woy Tunnel =

Railway tunnel in New South Wales, Australia

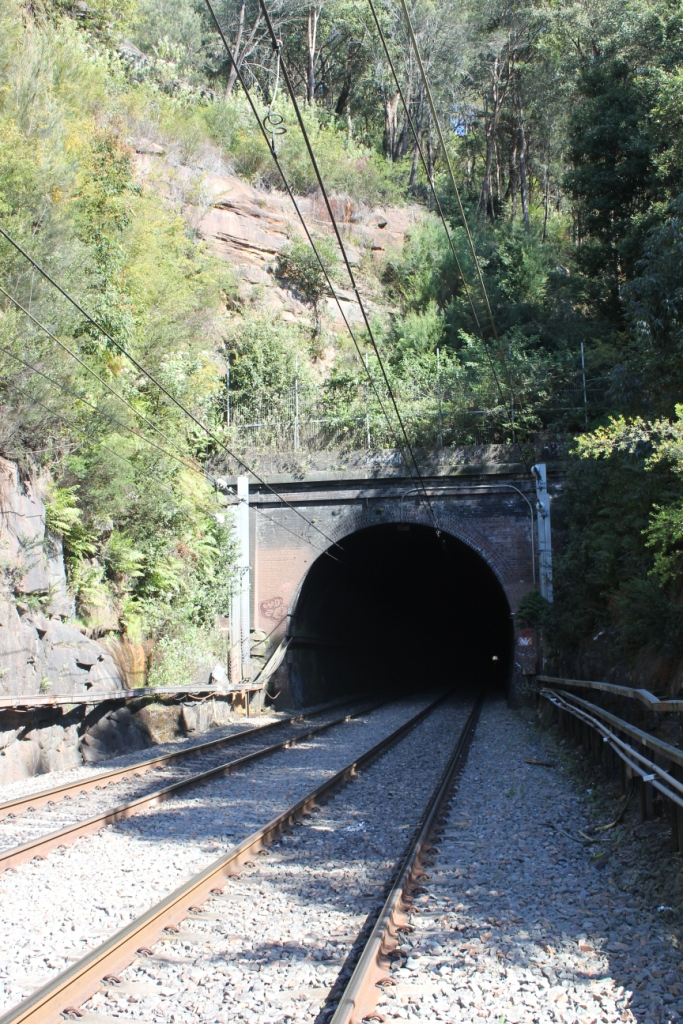
- Northern portal of the tunnel
- Interactive map of Woy Woy Tunnel

Overview
- Official name: Woy Woy Railway Tunnel
- Location: Woy Woy, New South Wales, Australia
- Coordinates: 33°29′27″S 151°16′56″E
- Start: 1 March 1884

Operation
- Opened: 16 January 1888
- Owner: Transport Asset Manager of New South Wales
- Operator: Sydney Trains

Technical
- Design engineer: George Blunt
- Line length: 1 mile 4 chains (1.69 km)
- No. of tracks: 2
- Track gauge: 4 ft 8 1/2 in (1,435 mm)

New South Wales Heritage Register
- Official name: Woy Woy Railway Tunnel
- Criteria: a., c., e., f., g.
- Designated: 28 June 2013
- Reference no.: 01835

The Woy Woy railway tunnel is a heritage-listed railway tunnel located between Wondabyne and Woy Woy stations on the Main Northern railway line in New South Wales, Australia. The dual-track 1.69-kilometre (1-mile-4-ch) tunnel was opened on 16 January 1888. It was added to the New South Wales State Heritage Register on 28 June 2013.

== Description ==
Woy Woy Tunnel is a 1.69-kilometre-long (1-mile-4-ch) double track railway tunnel passing beneath a sandstone ridge between Brisbane Water and Mullet Creek. The tunnel is of brick construction throughout. The tunnel was originally built for double track service and thus did not require widening when the line was duplicated in 1906. The brick portals feature a brick string course, but are otherwise plain. The tunnel is horseshoe shaped, straight and has an average 1 in 150 gradient. There is a long cutting in bedrock leading to both portals.

At the time of its completion in 1888, the tunnel was the longest railway tunnel in Australia.

== Construction history ==
Construction commenced on 1 March 1884. There was a breaking through ceremony on 17 July 1886; and the official opening was held on 16 January 1888. During construction the tunnel entrance had a crimson streamer stretched across it with the Latin phrase Labor omnia vincit, meaning, Hard work conquers all. A 180-metre (600 ft) hill rises above the tunnel. Construction took place without cessation, night and day, excepting only upon Sundays; and approximately 300 men were employed in the excavation works; and over 91 tonnes (100 short tons) of gunpowder and 9.1 tonnes (10 short tons) of dynamite. Perforation work for the tunnel was provided by ten percussion rock-drills using compressed air obtained from a 30-kilowatt (40 hp) engine. Approximately 95,200 cubic metres (124,500 cu yd) of rock were excavated and approximately 10,000,000 bricks were laid, supplied by Gore Hill Brickworks. A local shipbuilder and shipowner, Rock Davis, was given the task of transporting, over the water, the bricks for the tunnel lining. No less than 10,000 cement casks were used.^{1}

Flooding of the area occurred in 1887, resulting in an inspection of the site by Henry Deane,

The Sydney Morning Herald reported:

15 November 1887, Mr. H. Deane, inspecting engineer of the Railway Department, returned to Sydney from an inspection of the Woy Woy tunnel. It was revealed that a creek which passes over a portion of the tunnel was swollen by an unusually heavy rainfall. The water forced its way through the creek bed, around a portion of the tunnel lining and found an outlet through the weep-holes of the masonry work. No damage was done to the tunnel. To prevent the possibility of any future problems arising, it was proposed to temporarily channel the creek over the tunnel using flumes, whilst constructing a permanent solution.

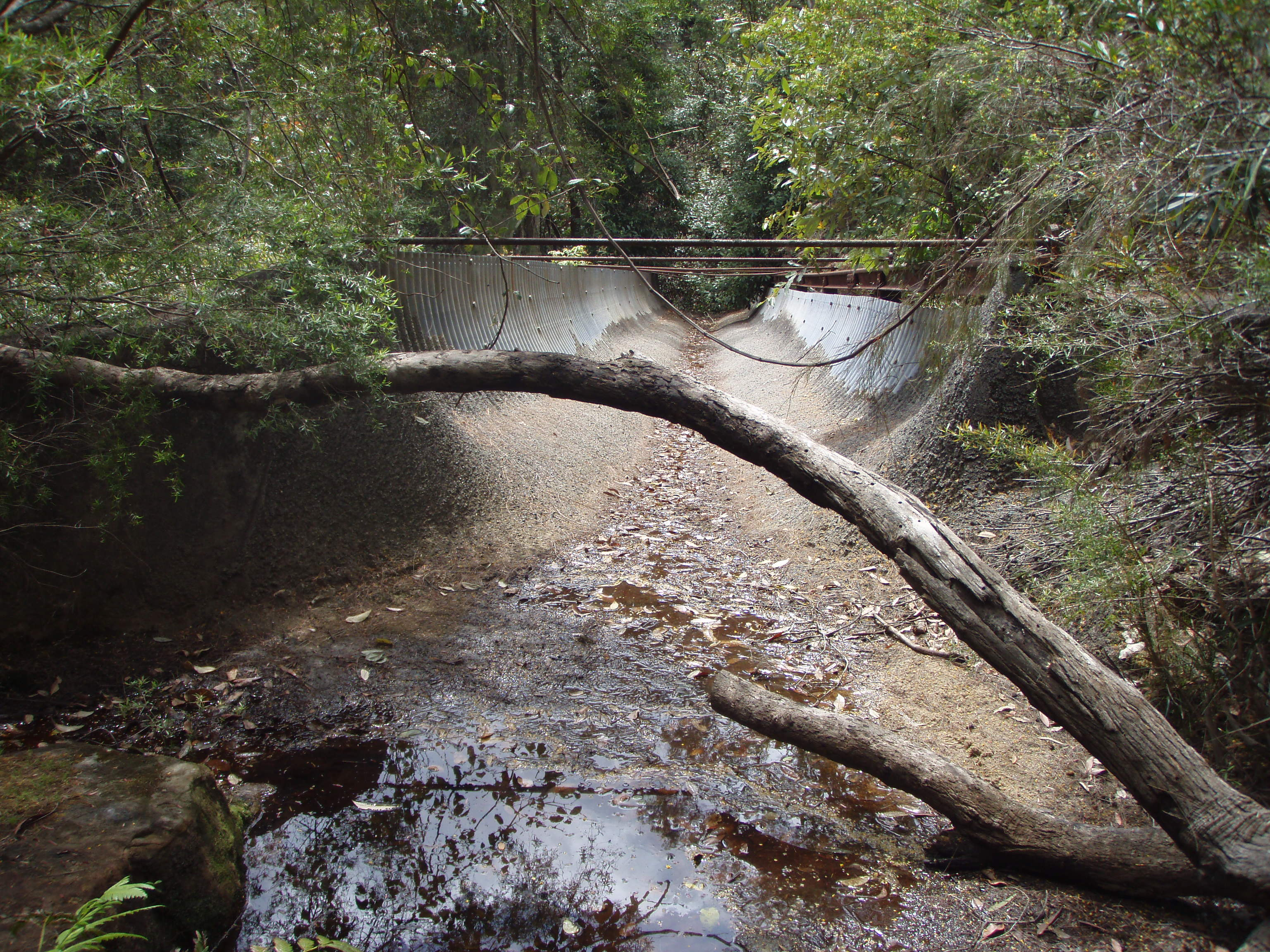
Creek diversion above southern portal of Woy Woy tunnel

=== Homebush-Waratah line ===
The construction of the Homebush-Waratah line was broken up into sections:

- Hornsby-Hawkesbury, 15 mi (24 km) opened 7 April 1887;
- Hawkesbury River Railway Bridge-Mullet Creek, 5 mi (8 km), opened 1 May 1889;
- Mullet Creek-Gosford, 10 mi (16 km), opened 16 January 1888;
- Gosford-Waratah, 50 mi (80 km), opened 15 August 1887.

Between April 1887 and May 1889, the Woy Woy Tunnel's major benefit of significantly reduced travel times were not able to be fully appreciated by passengers until the completion of the Hawkesbury-Mullet Creek section of track which involved the construction of the first Hawkesbury River railway bridge. Prior to the opening of the Hawkesbury-Mullet Creek section, which was dictated by the opening of the Hawkesbury River bridge, passengers disembarked from either Hawkesbury River, from the south, and Mullet Creek (closed 11 September 1897), from the north. Mullet Creek was located 400 metres (1,300 ft) north of the current Wondabyne station and 1.5 kilometres (0.93 mi) from the western entrance to the Tunnel. Passengers were required to catch a ferry between Hawkesbury River and Mullet Creek that met with trains at both terminus.

=== Gauge and loading gauge ===
The line was built with 4 ft 8 1/2 in (1.435 m) tracks and a loading gauge that accommodated 8-foot-4-inch-wide (2.54 m) carriages on double track with 11-foot (3.4 m) centres. In 1910, a new nation standard loading gauge was adopted for all mainland states, which was applied to all new works. In the 1920s, in the Sydney electrified area, the wider standard allowed for 3+2 seating in lieu of 2+2 seating.

Problems started to arise when in 1960 when the line though Woy Woy was electrified using so-called narrow stock. More problems arose in the 1972 with the introduction of double deck carriages, which required the removal of brickwork in the top corners of the circular tunnel profile with the roadbed lowered. In the 1990s so-called medium width stock of 3 metres (9.8 ft), such as the Tangara trains, were allowed through Woy Woy Tunnel.

== Original planned tunnel location ==
The following extract is from the New South Wales Legislative Assembly, 1 December 1881, Answers to Questions, as reported by The Sydney Morning Herald, in relation to connecting the Great Southern and Northern Lines via the construction of the Homebush-Waratah Line:

...From this point the line takes a north-easterly direction towards Flat Rock Point, crosses the channel between the southern mainland and Long Island; thence across the Hawkesbury River to Dangar Island (37 miles [60 km] from Redfern); and thence across the main channel of the river to a tunnel through the cliffs on the northern bank to Patonga Creek; thence by a tunnel through the high land between that creek and Woy Woy Creek, thence across that creek and skirting the western shore of Brisbane Water, across Narrara Creek through to the village of Gosford (49 miles [79 km])...

This original route and Tunnel location was not adopted.

== Heritage listing ==
The Woy Woy Railway Tunnel has historic significance, as at the time of its construction it was the longest tunnel in Australia and was recognised as one of two major engineering feats on the Short North line, the other being the Hawkesbury River Rail Bridge. The tunnel has associations with the linking of Sydney and Newcastle by rail and remains an essential component of this stretch of line.

The tunnel has aesthetic significance as it provides a powerful aesthetic break in the rail journey between Sydney and the Central Coast separating the rugged beauty along Mullet Creek from the flat urban sprawl of Woy Woy and Gosford. Along with other tunnels on the Short North line it adds to the aesthetic significance of the line as a whole with its man made engineering elements contrasting with the natural surrounds of the Hawkesbury River region, demonstrating the skills and technology available at the time of construction and a high degree of engineering achievement in building a railway line in difficult terrain.

Woy Woy Tunnel was listed on the New South Wales State Heritage Register on 28 June 2013 having satisfied the following criteria.

The place is important in demonstrating the course, or pattern, of cultural or natural history in New South Wales.

Woy Woy Railway Tunnel has historic significance as at the time of its construction it was the longest tunnel in Australia and was recognised as one of two major engineering feats on the Short North Line, the other being the Hawkesbury River Rail Bridge. The tunnel has associations with the linking of Sydney and Newcastle by rail and remains an essential component of this stretch of line.

The place is important in demonstrating aesthetic characteristics and/or a high degree of creative or technical achievement in New South Wales.

Along with other tunnels on the Short North line it adds to the aesthetic significance of the line as a whole with its man made engineering elements contrasting with the natural surrounds of the Hawkesbury River region. The tunnels add to the experience of travelling on the Sydney to Newcastle line.

The tunnel has technical significance. It demonstrates the skills and technology available at the time of construction and it forms part of a set of tunnels and bridges on the Short North line that demonstrate a high degree of engineering achievement in building a railway line in difficult terrain. At the time of its construction it was the longest railway tunnel in Australia. It is currently the longest railway tunnel in NSW (excluding the Sydney City Circle underground network).

The place has potential to yield information that will contribute to an understanding of the cultural or natural history of New South Wales.

The tunnel itself has minimal archaeological research potential. However, the navvy camp near the Mullet Creek portal has considerable potential to inform our understanding of the working lives of railway construction workers. Archaeological remains of railway workers camps on the scale likely to remain at the Woy Woy tunnel are rare in NSW.

The place possesses uncommon, rare or endangered aspects of the cultural or natural history of New South Wales.

The tunnel is not rare. There are numerous other examples of this construction in the State and on the Short North line, including Tickhole Tunnel and the tunnels in the vicinity of the Hawkesbury River Rail Bridge. It is however, the longest tunnel outside the Sydney underground network, which makes it distinctive.

The place is important in demonstrating the principal characteristics of a class of cultural or natural places/environments in New South Wales.

The tunnel is a good example of its type and is representative of double track railway tunnels within the NSW rail network. It is the oldest tunnel still in use in NSW and the longest tunnel outside the Sydney underground rail network.

== Tragedies ==
Date	Fatalities	Comments	Notes
19 January 1917	One	A fettler was killed and another severely injured in the Woy Woy tunnel by a goods train. Prior to the tragedy the train had a minor accident inside the tunnel about 100 yards from the Woy Woy end. In order to get it out, the train had to be uncoupled in the middle and the engine proceeded to Woy Woy with the first half of the train. As the engine with the first half of the train went pass 3 fettlers and a ganger working just inside the tunnel on the down rails (those leading to Gosford) they merely regarded it as a complete train. When the engine returned from Woy Woy for the second half of trucks it ran back on the same line. The workers hearing the engine approach, travelling tender foremost showing no light, mistakenly thought they were stepping out of the way of a train heading in the opposite direction. Mr Julius Christiansen, of Woy Woy, was hurled forcibly against the wall of the tunnel and died almost instantly of head injuries. Mr James McKay, also of Woy Woy, was knocked down by Mr Christiansen's flight, and received slight injuries to the leg. The other fettler and the ganger escaped uninjured.	
24 November 1917	One	Darcy Bell (aged 29) was killed in the Woy Woy tunnel by the 2 p.m. passenger train from Sydney. Bell, a returned soldier, was employed by the Railway Commissioners as a guard at the southern mouth of the tunnel. He was proceeding to his work when the accident occurred.	
12 September 1921	One	At the inquiry held by the District Coroner, Mr W. E. Kirkness, regarding the death of Cecil T. Pike (aged 22), a railway shunter at Clyde, who was knocked down and killed by a passenger train in the Woy Woy tunnel shortly after 10 pm. The deceased was spending the weekend fishing at Wondabyne and was in Woy Woy earlier in the evening. He returned to Wondabyne with another railway employee on a tricycle, but afterwards walked back along the line to look for a coat which had been dropped. His body was found about 80 chains from the Woy Woy end of the tunnel. A verdict of accidental death was returned. The coroner remarked that there was no evidence of any negligence on the part of the train officials.	
21 September 1931	One	A Hawkesbury College student fell from a train In Woy Woy tunnel, his thigh being broken and one of his legs severed.	
22 August 1940	Three	Three men were killed and four others injured by a goods train in the Woy Woy Tunnel shortly before 1 pm. The seven men were employees of the Railway Department who were, along with another 50 men in 3 gangs, working in the tunnel on draining and concreting the lines. Two trains passed through the tunnel going in both directions, the men were warned of their approach by the watchman. The trains left dense smoke in the tunnel which has electric lights along the walls. Visibility in the tunnel was poor due to the train engines’ smoke. A few minutes later a goods train travelling from Enfield to Broadmeadow entered from the Hawkesbury end, the seven men were not aware that this train was approaching and it was on them before they could jump to safety. The driver of the goods train did not see the men, a man's cap was found on the front of the engine at Woy Woy Station. Those killed were: Michael Shelley (aged 47), married of Punchbowl suffered decapitation and a severed leg; John Dillon (aged 37), married of South Woy Woy suffered a broken neck, Lynton Munce (aged 44) of Paddington suffered decapitation and Andrew Jack Blackie (aged 41), married of West Wallsend. The injured were: William Whitten (aged 31) of Cardiff who suffered a fractured skull, severe abrasions and lacerations all over his body; Andrew J Blackie (aged 41) of West Wallsend who suffered a fractured skull and internal injuries; Reginald Mason (aged 28) of Adamstown who suffered a fractured skull and ribs and Angus Blakely (aged 41) of West Wallsend who suffered a fractured skull and severe lacerations. With the exception of Blackie, all were married. Andrew Jack Blackie died in Newcastle Hospital approximately 24 hours after the incident. Men engaged on railway repairs in the tunnel decided at a meeting to refrain from working in the tunnel until visibility at either end was clear. The men requested for trains to be run on one line through the tunnel during repair work. The proposal to stand by to await a clearing of the smoke would reduce the element of risk to a reasonable minimum and reduce the danger to life to a positive minimum. 19 September 1940, at the inquest yesterday into the death of four men who were killed by a goods train in the Woy Woy tunnel, the driver of the train said that his vision was blank for part of the journey through the mile-long tunnel. During the Inquest the District Coroner, Mr C. J. Staples, said that they were the victims of a system that sometimes put earnings and profits above human life. Mr Staples returned a finding of accidental death and was quoted as saying, I hope the Railway Commissioner will tighten up the efforts for greater safety for his employees. When union officials ask for safety conditions it should not be thought that they are putting one over the boss. Employers should recognise workmen's and union's fears and I believe this would result in the saving of life. You may hear that such people are agitators trying to make it harder for the Commissioner. But I hold that the men and officials concerned who advise on safe working conditions should be given serious consideration.	

== See also ==
- List of tunnels in Australia

== Notes ==
1. Circa 1886, both Australian and imported cement was packaged in wooden casks, each containing 3 bushels, about 4 to 4.25 cubic feet (about 170 kg net) depending upon the fineness of the cement. The density of cement specified in 1886 for City of Sydney use was 112 to 113 pounds per bushel.
