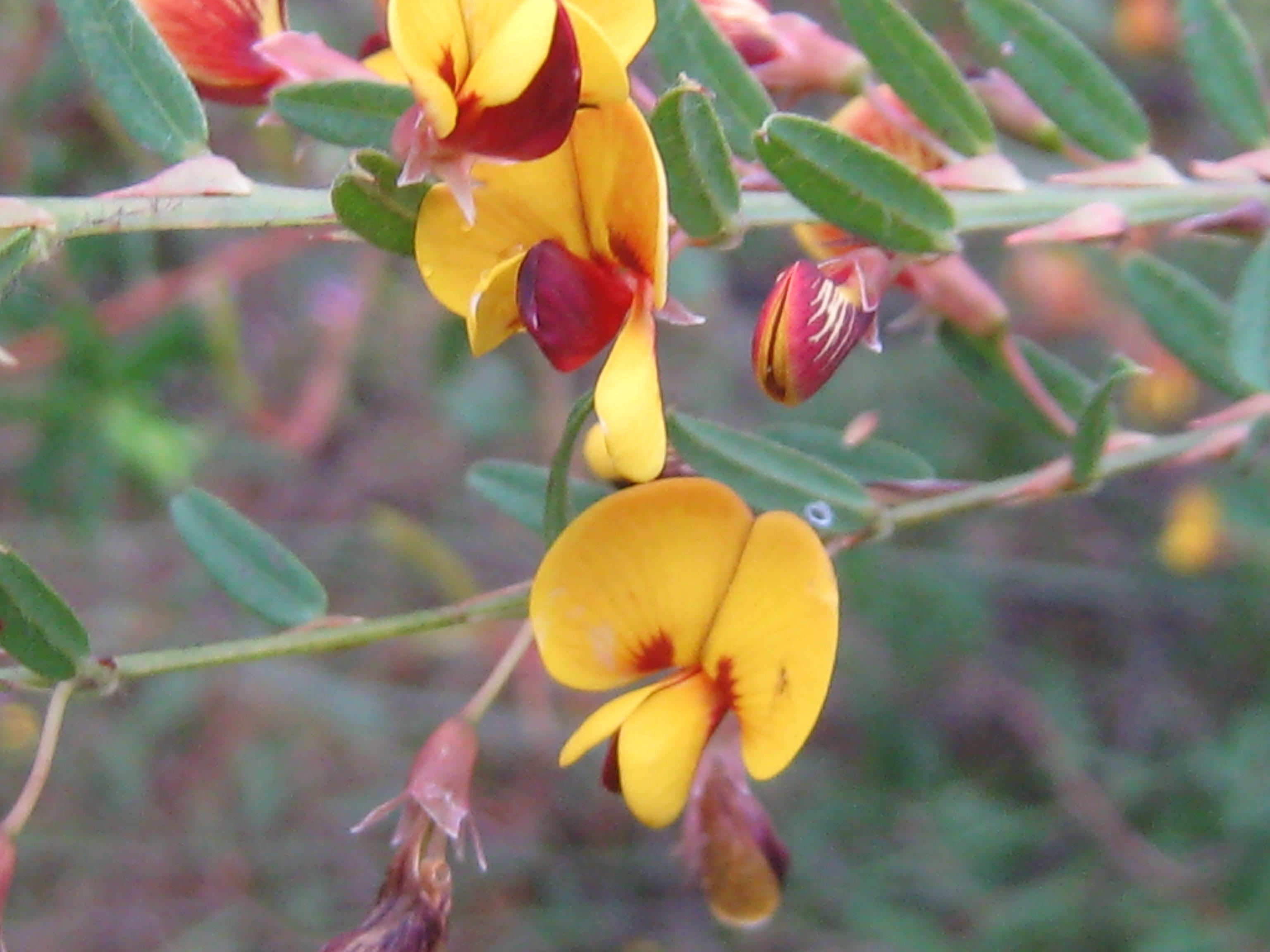
- Near Patonga

Scientific classification
- Kingdom: Plantae
- Clade: Tracheophytes
- Clade: Angiosperms
- Clade: Eudicots
- Clade: Rosids
- Order: Fabales
- Family: Fabaceae
- Subfamily: Faboideae
- Genus: Bossiaea
- Species: B. stephensonii

Binomial name
- Bossiaea stephensonii F.Muell.
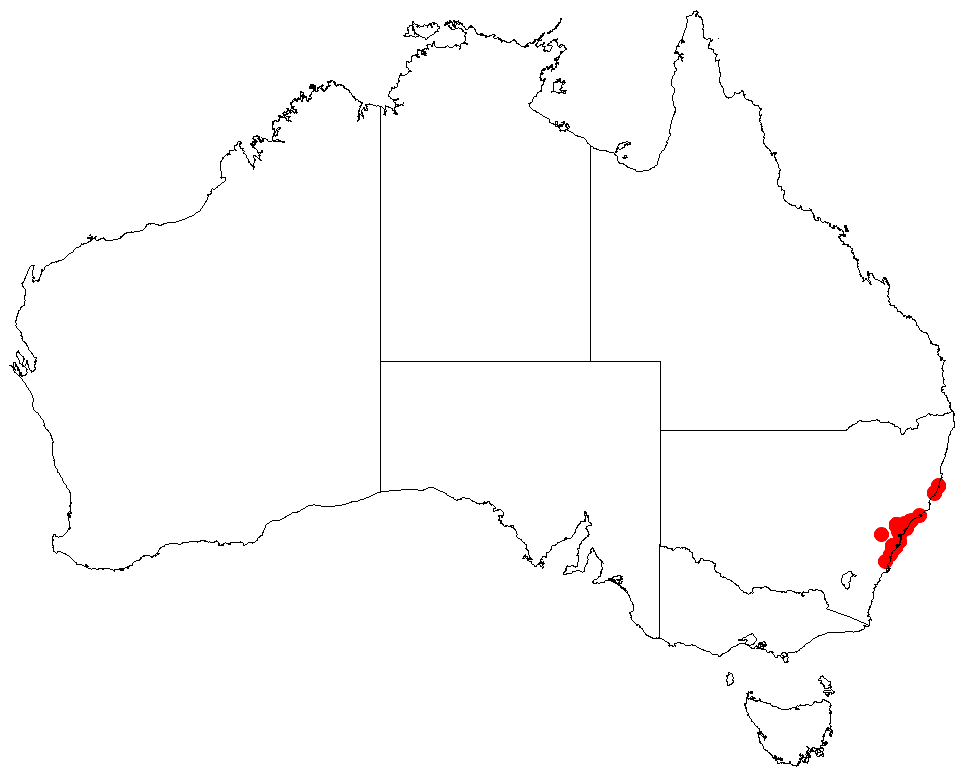
- Occurrence data from the AVH

= Bossiaea stephensonii =

Species of legume

Bossiaea stephensonii is a species of flowering plant in the family Fabaceae and is endemic to near-coastal areas of New South Wales. It is a small, weakly erect, multi-stemmed shrub with sharply-pointed, mostly elliptic to egg-shaped leaves, and bright yellow and red flowers.

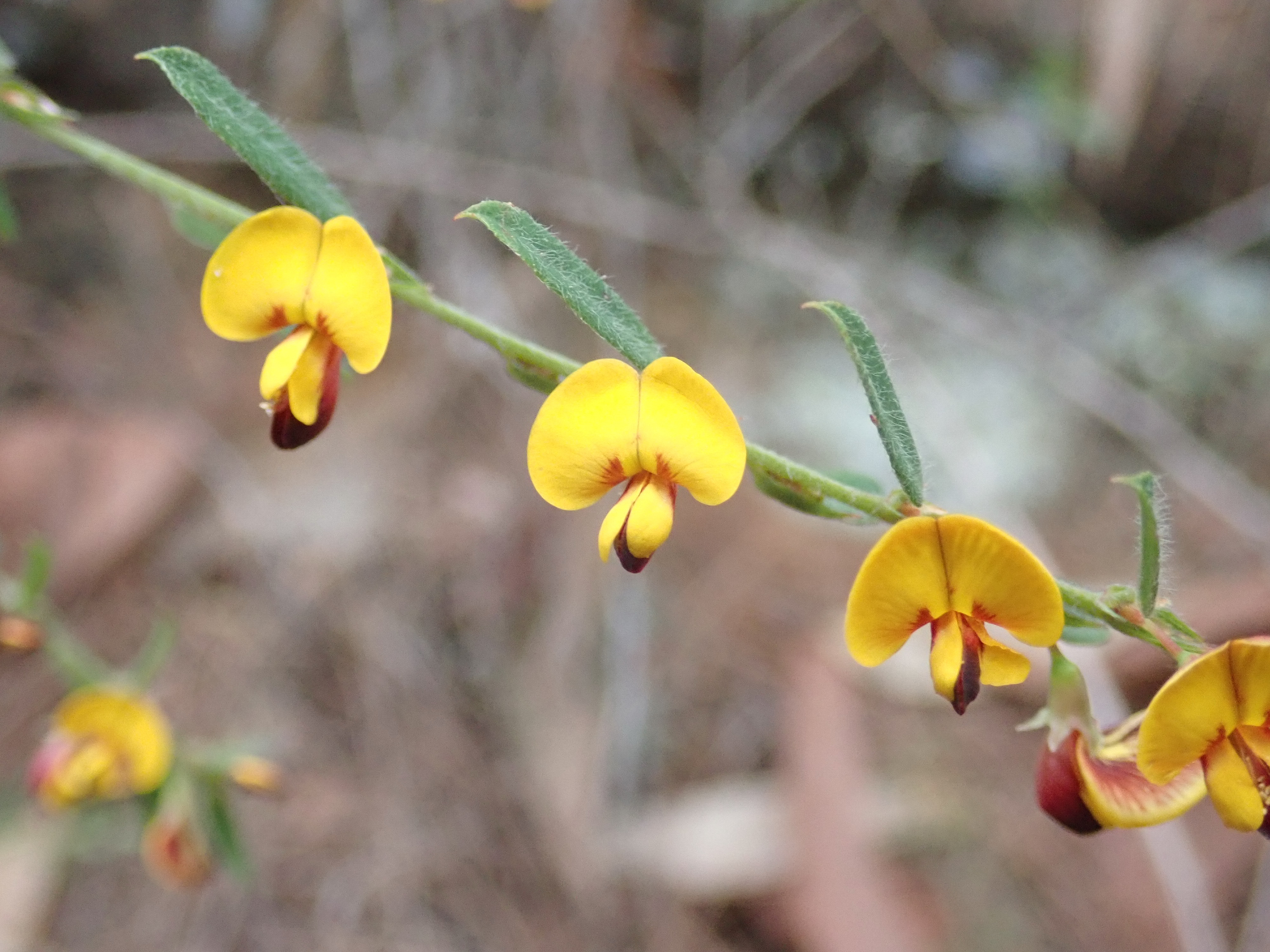
In Brisbane Water National Park

== Description ==
Bossiaea stephensonii is a weakly erect, multi-stemmed shrub that typically grows to a height of up to about 1 m (3 ft 3 in) and is more or less glabrous apart from its young growth. The stems are strongly flattened, 1–3 mm (0.039–0.118 in) wide and sometimes winged. The leaves are sharply-pointed, mostly elliptic to egg-shaped, 7–20 mm (0.28–0.79 in) long and 2–7 mm (0.079–0.276 in) wide on a petiole 1.5–3 mm (0.059–0.118 in) long. The edges of the leaves curve downwards and there are stipules 4–8 mm (0.16–0.31 in) long at the base. The flowers are borne singly in leaf axils, each flower 8–12 mm (0.31–0.47 in) long on a pedicel up to 7 mm (0.28 in) long with one or a few bracts 2 mm (0.079 in) long at the base, and bracteoles 2.0–2.5 mm (0.079–0.098 in) long but that fall off as the flower opens. The five sepals are 3–4 mm (0.12–0.16 in) long and joined at the base forming a tube, the upper lobes 1.2–2.8 mm (0.047–0.110 in) long and about 1.5 mm (0.059 in) wide, the lower lobes shorter and narrower. The standard petal is yellow with a red base and up to 12 mm (0.47 in) long, the wings are reddish and 2 mm (0.079 in) wide, and the keel is pink grading to dark red and 3 mm (0.12 in) wide. Flowering occurs from August to October and the fruit is an oblong pod 15–25 mm (0.59–0.98 in) long.

== Taxonomy ==
Bossiaeae stephensonii was first formally described in 1887 by Ferdinand von Mueller in Proceedings of the Linnean Society of New South Wales from specimens collected "near Wollongong" by the "erudite" "L. Stephenson, B.A.".

== Distribution and habitat ==
This bossiaea grows in forest, woodland and heathland, often found on exposed, near-coastal sandstone, from Port Macquarie to the Illawarra region.
