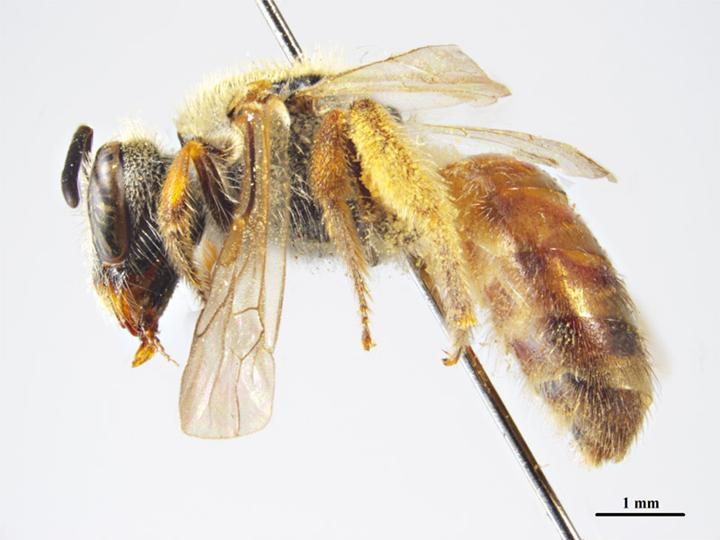
- Female
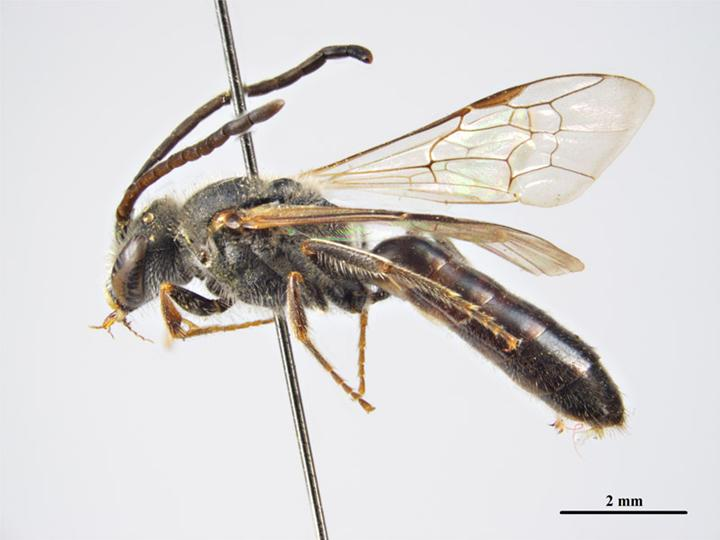
- Male

Scientific classification
- Kingdom: Animalia
- Phylum: Arthropoda
- Clade: Pancrustacea
- Class: Insecta
- Order: Hymenoptera
- Family: Halictidae
- Genus: Lasioglossum
- Species: L. bryotrichum

Binomial name
- Lasioglossum bryotrichum (Cockerell, 1912)

Synonyms
- Parasphecodes bryotrichus Cockerell, 1912; Parasphecodes bryotrichus sordidulus Cockerell, 1914; Parasphecodes bribiensis Cockerell, 1916; Parasphecodes (Aphalictus) bribiensiformis Cockerell, 1930; Halictus butleri Rayment, 1935; Halictus patongensis Rayment, 1948; Lasioglossum (Parasphecodes) frenchellum Michener, 1965

= Lasioglossum bryotrichum =

Species of bee

Lasioglossum bryotrichum, or Lasioglossum (Parasphecodes) bryotrichum, is a species of bee in the family Halictidae and subfamily Halictinae. It is endemic to Australia. It was described by British-American entomologist Theodore Dru Alison Cockerell in 1912.

== Description ==
Female body length is about 8.5 mm. Head and thorax are black, abdomen pale red.

== Distribution and habitat ==
The species occurs in south-eastern mainland Australia. Type localities include Brisbane and Bribie Island in Queensland; Patonga, New South Wales; and Cheltenham and Lakes Entrance in Victoria.

== Behaviour ==
The adults are flying mellivores. Flowering plants visited by the bees include Eucalyptus, Leptospermum, Melaleuca and Bursaria species.
