= Hawkesbury River railway bridge =

Railway bridge in New South Wales, Australia

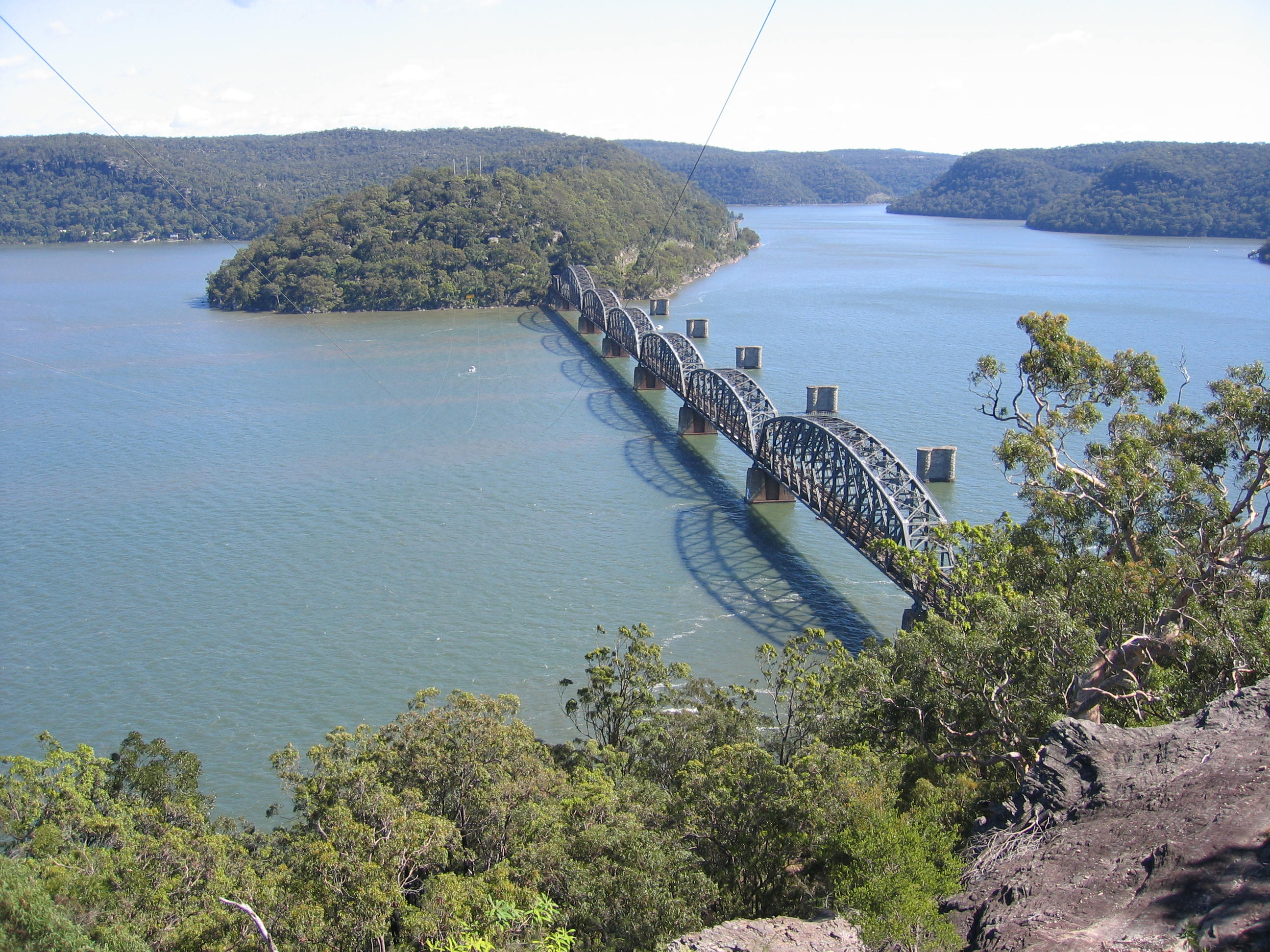
- The (current) Hawkesbury railway bridge, looking north
- Coordinates: 33°32′2″S 151°13′42″E
- Carries: Main North railway line
- Crosses: Hawkesbury River
- Locale: Sydney/Central Coast, New South Wales
- Begins: Brooklyn (south)
- Ends: Cogra Bay (north)
- Owner: Transport Asset Manager of New South Wales

Characteristics
- Design: Riveted K and Pratt truss bridge
- Material: Steel
- Total length: 785 metres (2,575 ft)
- Water depth: 56 metres (183 ft)
- Longest span: 135.64 metres (445 ft)
- No. of spans: Eight
- Piers in water: Six
- Load limit: 60 Cooper's e-value

Rail characteristics
- No. of tracks: 2
- Structure gauge: 4 ft 8 1/2 in (1,435 mm) standard gauge
- Electrified: January 1960

History
- Designer: Keith 'Mick' King
- Contracted lead designer: Way and Works Branch, NSW Government Railways
- Constructed by: NSW Government Railways
- Fabrication by: Structural Workshops, Chullora
- Construction start: 18 July 1939
- Construction cost: A£1,400,000
- Opened: 1 July 1946
- Replaces: First bridge built in 1889

New South Wales Heritage Register
- Official name: Hawkesbury River Rail Bridge and Long Island Group
- Type: State heritage (built)
- Designated: 2 April 1999
- Reference no.: 4800130
- Type: Rail Bridge
- Category: Transport – Land

Location
- Interactive map of Hawkesbury River railway bridge

The Hawkesbury River railway bridge is a heritage-listed railway bridge in New South Wales, Australia which carries the Main North railway line across the Hawkesbury River. The bridge crosses between Brooklyn on the northern outskirts of Sydney and Cogra Bay in the Central Coast region. The railway bridge was to be the last link in a railway network that linked the state capitals Adelaide, Melbourne, Sydney and Brisbane and was a major engineering feat at the time. The original railway bridge was built in 1889 and replaced by the current bridge in 1946. The 1946 bridge was added to the New South Wales State Heritage Register on 2 April 1999.

== Before the bridge ==
On 7 April 1887, the single track section of the Main North line was opened between Hornsby and the Hawkesbury River. Passengers and goods heading north now unloaded at the River Wharf platform on the eastern end of Long Island, transferring to the double decker, rear paddled-wheeled steamer General Gordon for a three-hour trip out to Broken Bay and up Brisbane Water to Gosford where the train service recommenced. Once the 1.7-kilometre-long (1.1 mi) Woy Woy Tunnel was opened on 15 August 1887, the boat trip was considerably shortened as the boat only had to cross the river and negotiate the lower reaches of Mullet Creek to reach Mullet Creek station.

== First bridge ==
Hawkesbury River railway bridge (first bridge)
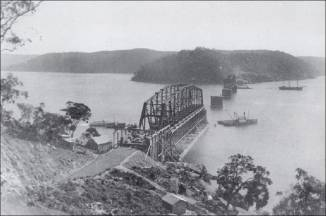
- First bridge under construction in 1888
- Coordinates: 33°32′2″S 151°13′42″E
- Carries: Main North railway line
- Crosses: Hawkesbury River
- Locale: Brooklyn, New South Wales
- Begins: Brooklyn (south)
- Ends: Cogra Bay (north)

Characteristics
- Design: Riveted truss bridge
- Material: Steel
- Total length: 887 metres (2,910 ft)
- Water depth: 46 to 49 metres (150 to 160 ft)
- Longest span: 127 metres (416 ft)
- No. of spans: Seven
- Piers in water: Five
- Load limit: 25 Cooper's e-value

Rail characteristics
- No. of tracks: 1

History
- Designer: John Whitton
- Constructed by: Union Bridge Company, New York
- Construction cost: A£367,000
- Opened: 1 May 1889
- Closed: 1946
- Replaces: General Gordon, a double decker, rear paddled-wheeled steamer
- Replaced by: Hawkesbury River railway bridge (current)

Location
- Interactive map of Hawkesbury River railway bridge (first bridge)

The Union Bridge Company of New York was awarded the contract to construct the bridge in January 1886. The railways engineer-in-chief, John Whitton, who designed and built the railway was not invited to design the bridge due to fallout from a mid 1880s enquiry into railway bridges. However, subcontractors were also involved in the actual construction work. The piers consisted of concrete below water with sandstone masonry above. The spans were assembled on Dangar Island and floated 1,500 metres (4,921 ft) or so across to the bridge site on barges.

The bridge had seven spans of 127 metres (416 ft) each for a total length of 887 metres (2,910 ft). Five of the piers were sunk to then record depths of between 46 and 49 metres (150 and 160 ft) below high water. The bridge officially opened on 1 May 1889.

=== Load testing ===
At the time, it was the longest structure to be load tested in Australia and so two distinct and separate methods were used. Firstly, optical measurements were taken of the deformation under load at the centre of each span, taken by two sets of observers positioned atop the stone piers. The second test used a water gauge to accurately measure the deformation and the amount of deflection or "set" for each span.

Load testing was carried out on 24 April 1889 in the presence of various dignitaries including Henry Deane, the Assistant Engineer in Chief of the New South Wales Government Railways. During the morning, each span was tested separately by slowly running trains out onto the span, taking the required measurements, backing the train off again and retaking the measurements. This was repeated for each span but on the second span it was found that the optical readings did not match the water gauge. The cause was found to be a slow leak in a connecting pipe of the water gauge equipment. There was only one water gauge available and as the leak would become worse as the equipment was moved from span to span for each reading it was decided to abandon this method and rely wholly on the optical readings.

A speed test was undertaken during the afternoon by four locomotives, coupled in two pairs. They were started off by a flagman standing above the Long Island tunnel and the trains ran across the causeway from Hawkesbury River station through the Long Island tunnel and out across the bridge at maximum speed.

=== Problems arise ===
Although the track on either end of the bridge was single line, the bridge itself was constructed to double track width with an eye to the future duplication of the line. This led to the undesirable practice of the bridge being used as a crossing point for trains, thus regularly subjecting the structure to maximum stress loads.

The bridge showed signs of problems within 12 months and the contractors were called back to repair some faults with the piers. Through the 1920s and 1930s, many design faults and problems became evident. By 1925 the original loading of the bridge was considered inadequate and in 1925 it was decided to strengthen the deck. The work took nearly six years between 1926 and 1931 and numerous problems were experienced with the pin-jointed construction of the trusses, which while easy to assemble were difficult to maintain and strengthen.

In 1938 a severe crack in one of the piers was discovered and it became necessary to replace the entire structure. The depth of sediment had made it impossible to reach bedrock with the foundations on the southernmost pier and it seems that this was the cause of the structural faults. The amount of traffic being carried (up to 100 trains a day) during World War II made the replacement extremely urgent and prior to the new bridge being brought into operation the speed limit on the old bridge was restricted to 23 km/h (14 mph) and finally down to 6 km/h (4 mph) with tracks altered to gauntlet configuration to ensure trains could not pass.

== Second bridge ==
Design and construction of a replacement bridge commenced in 1939, due to concerns that the original bridge would not hold up to extra loading and traffic caused by transport demands of World War II. Work commenced on the new bridge in July 1940 and despite best efforts it was not completed until after the war finished, opening for traffic on 1 July 1946. The new bridge was positioned 60 metres (197 ft) to the west or upstream of the original bridge and consists of eight spans in three different lengths and piers sunk to depths of up to 56 metres (183 ft). New tunnels were bored through Long Island to the south and Cogra Point on the northern approach.

The design, foundation work and fabrication of the new bridge were undertaken by the New South Wales Government Railways and over 500 men worked on the project, with six dying during construction. A plaque commemorating the lives lost is at the southern end of the bridge, at the northern portal of the 1946 tunnel through Long Island.

The spans for the new bridge were constructed adjacent to the bridge site on the northern side of Long Island, raised to the correct height, placed onto barges and floated out to the piers at high tide. Upon completion of the new bridge, the old bridge was removed, however the sandstone capped piers remain to this day. The construction docks remain in situ.

=== Issues ===
In 2016, a report revealed cracking in concrete pylons as well as "consistent defects" in the steel frame of the bridge. As a result, limits are planned to be imposed on the weight capacity of freight trains crossing the bridge, pending possible strengthening of sections of the bridge to allow heavier loads.

== Description ==
=== Bridge ===
The Hawkesbury River Rail bridge is an eight truss railway bridge, supported on reinforced concrete piers, west of the remnant piers and abutments of the 1889 bridge. The bridge crosses the Hawkesbury River from Long Island to the northern shore, approximately one kilometre (one mile) north of Hawkesbury River Railway Station. The bridge is a 785-metre (2,575 ft) steel truss railway underbridge, consisting of two 44.81-metre (147 ft) trusses, two 135.64-metre (445 ft) trusses and four 105.92-metre (348 ft) trusses, all on concrete piers supported on caissons. The bridge is symmetrical with two short Pratt trusses at the shore lines, then two large K-trusses, with four large Pratt trusses in between.

At the southern end of the bridge, adjacent to the entrance of the current concrete lined railway tunnel are two plaques on a concrete pier: one plaque commemorates the opening of the bridge on 1 July 1946 and the other commemorates the lives lost during construction.

=== Construction docks ===
There are three construction docks immediately west of the southern abutment of the Hawkesbury River Rail Bridge. Only one of these is in RailCorp ownership. The docks were used for the construction of the steel trusses of the 1946 bridge. They are formed from rectangular cuttings into the bedrock. Each cutting contained a barge which supported the ends and middle of each large truss as they were being built. They were then floated from this position to specific piers and raised into their permanent position. The end of the dock in RailCorp ownership (the easternmost dock) has been extended in concrete and also has a set of steps providing access from the adjacent construction terrace next to the southern abutment of the bridge. This construction terrace has two footings made from concrete and steel plate, also associated with the construction phase. Under the abutment of the 1946 bridge there is a room containing a compressor and other materials. This space has a concrete vaulted ceiling and was originally an arched opening under the abutment and subsequently infilled.

=== Surviving first bridge abutments ===
The southern abutment is constructed in concrete and face Hawkesbury sandstone and rises approximately 20 metres (66 ft) above the shoreline. It is classical in detail, particularly to the side elevations with the north-facing elevation constructed in ashlar stonework. Constructed on top of the abutment is a c. 1960s concrete block staff building associated with the maintenance depot. Within this 1960s structure and affixed to the top of the abutment is a large cast iron plaque which was formerly located on the crest of the first span of the original rail bridge. It commemorates construction of the bridge by the Union Bridge Company. On the southern abutment there is a range of historic graffiti dating from 1901 to the present day.

North from this abutment are a series of large sandstone piers within the Hawkesbury River. The deck of the former bridge has been removed. The northernmost pier is relatively close to the shore and subsequently the northern abutment is less elaborate and imposing than the southern abutment.

Immediately to the north of the southernmost abutment, but slightly off alignment, is a concrete footing on the shoreline at the mean high water mark, which may have been linked to construction of the former or current bridges.

== Heritage listing ==
The current and former Hawkesbury River Rail Bridges have State heritage significance. It forms part of a railway precinct of exceptional significance, with elements in an outstanding setting that represent key events in the history of railway development in NSW and demonstrate high levels of engineering achievement and the changes in railway technology in NSW in the period between the 1880s and 1970s.

The completion of the 1886 Hawkesbury River Railway Bridge saw the linkage not only of the significant Sydney to Newcastle Railway link but also in effect, the railway systems of South Australia, Victoria, New South Wales and Queensland were joined by continuous rail with the opening of the bridge. The Bridge was used by Sir Henry Parkes as a powerful symbol of Federation and he gave the address at the opening of the bridge, which has been claimed by some as his first Federation speech. The abutments and piers of the bridge as well as the 1886 Long Island tunnel are tangible reminders of these significant events and the symbolic power they had for people at the time not only in NSW but throughout Australia. Both the 1889 and 1946 bridges and associated infrastructure on Long Island also demonstrate the significant investment in the railway system of NSW in the late nineteenth and early twentieth centuries. The workmanship of both bridges demonstrates the significant pride and confidence in the railways at the time.

The surviving sandstone elements of the former Hawkesbury River Bridge and the current Bridge have exceptional aesthetic value in their setting on the Hawkesbury River. The contrast of the man-made bridges and tunnels with the rugged and natural landscape of Hawkesbury River allows passengers and visitors to appreciate the engineering achievements of the railway line's construction. The vantage point of the approach to Long Island and the bridge also allows passengers to appreciate views of the natural landscape. Both of these factors have made the railway journey a destination in itself for generations of rail passengers.

The 1889 Hawkesbury River Bridge, Long Island Tunnel, Woy Woy Tunnel and the heavy earthworks and tunnels of the Cowan bank were the key engineering works on the Sydney to Newcastle rail link (The Short North). Together they demonstrate a high degree of engineering achievement in building a railway line in difficult and dangerous terrain. The 1889 Hawkesbury River Bridge in particular was a major technical achievement at the time: it was the fourth largest bridge constructed in the world, one of its caissons reached 49m, had the deepest bridge footing in the world and it was the longest bridge in Australia, pushing bridge design and construction techniques to the limit. The bridge was also the first of the American designed truss bridges that were introduced to Australia in the late 1880s and 1890s and thus the first to utilise the American principles of lightweight bracing, pin joints and eye bar tension members. It was the only steel trussed bridge of its type in Australia when it was built and the first major use of steel for bridges with previous examples being built in wrought iron. Its remains are tangible evidence of the change in engineering technology from British to American at this time and the decline of John Whitton's British based design influence on the NSW railway system. There is enough extant fabric in the remaining abutments, piers and the Long Island tunnel to demonstrate the engineering achievements of the original Hawkesbury River crossing.

The 1946 railway bridge was also a major technical achievement at the time of its construction, its large riveted steel trusses and its footings were still among the deepest in the world. It remains the longest purpose built rail bridge in the NSW network. The bridge itself as well as the remnant construction docks, platform and power station demonstrate the technical achievements in the construction of the bridge. The docks in particular provide direct evidence for the method of construction and the challenges associated with construction in this estuarine environment.

Hawkesbury River Railway Bridge was listed on the New South Wales State Heritage Register on 2 April 1999.

== Engineering heritage award ==
The bridge is listed as a National Engineering Landmark by Engineers Australia as part of its Engineering Heritage Recognition Program.

== Gallery ==
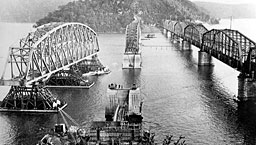
Original and replacement under construction, c. 1945

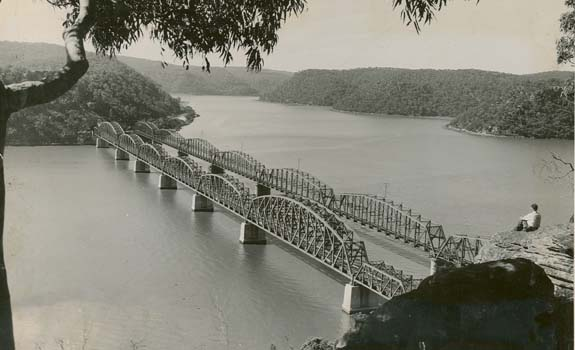
First and second bridges side by side

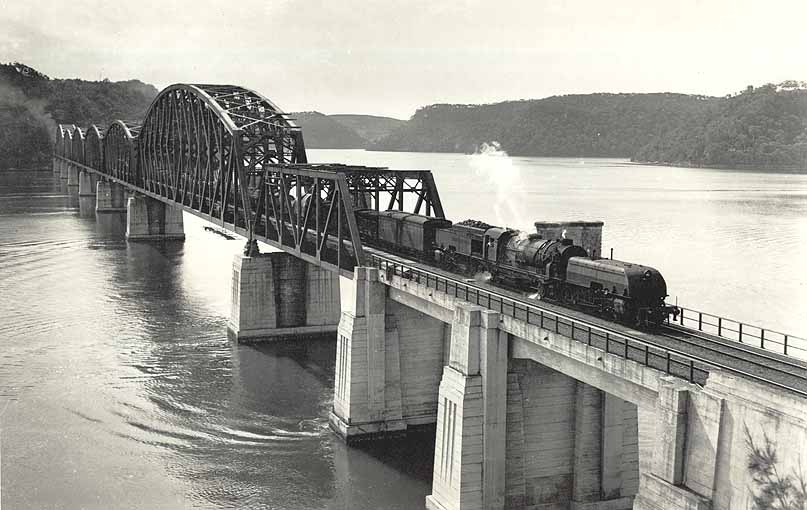
Second bridge – a pylon from the first bridge can be seen in the background

== See also ==
- Historic bridges of New South Wales
- List of railway bridges in New South Wales
