= Cogra Bay =

Cogra Bay Central Coast, New South Wales
- Coordinates: 33°30′54″S 151°13′05″E
- Population: 18 (2016 census)
- Postcode(s): 2083
- Elevation: 12 m (39 ft)
- Location: 51 km (32 mi) NE of Sydney; 28 km (17 mi) SW of Gosford
- LGA(s): Central Coast Council
- Parish: Patonga
- State electorate(s): Gosford
- Federal division(s): Robertson
Suburbs around Cogra Bay:
Cheero Point	Wondabyne	Wondabyne
Mooney Mooney	Cogra Bay	Patonga
Hawkesbury River	Hawkesbury River	Hawkesbury River

Cogra Bay is a locality of the Central Coast region of New South Wales, Australia, located on the north bank of the Hawkesbury River 51 kilometres (32 mi) north of Sydney. It is part of the Central Coast Council local government area.

Cogra Bay is bounded by the Hawkesbury River to the south, the mouth of the Mooney Mooney Creek to the west, Mullet Creek to the east, and the Brisbane Water National Park to the north. It consists of a number of properties accessible only by boat or by water taxi which goes to other parts of the Central Coast and Sydney. Although, due to shallow water in some parts of the bay, there may be limited access at low tide. Cogra Bay residents enjoy an off-grid lifestyle, using solar power and rain water tank storage. The nearest railway station is Wondabyne.
