= Koolewong railway station =

Railway station in New South Wales, Australia

Koolewong
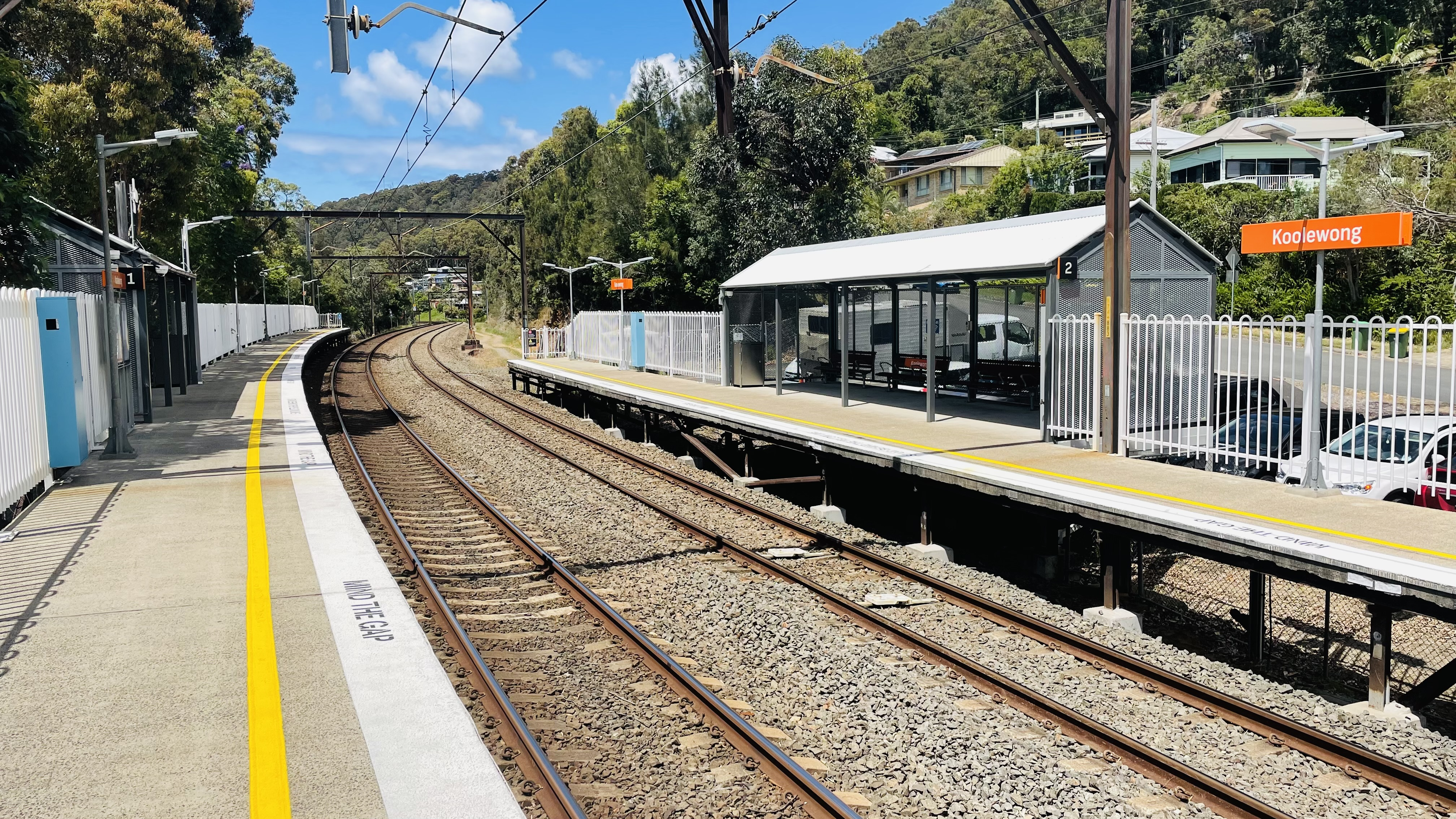
- Southbound view from Platform 1, November 2022

General information
- Location: Brisbane Water Drive, Koolewong; Australia
- Coordinates: 33°27′59″S 151°19′07″E
- Elevation: 9 m (30 ft)
- Owner: Transport Asset Manager of New South Wales
- Operator: Sydney Trains
- Line: Main Northern
- Distance: 74.82 km (46.49 mi) from Sydney Central
- Platforms: 2 side
- Tracks: 2
- Connections: Bus

Construction
- Structure type: Ground
- Accessible: Assisted access

Other information
- Station code: KWG
- Website: Transport for NSW

History
- Opened: 29 November 1920; 105 years ago

Passengers
- 2025: 30,444 (year); 83 (daily) (Sydney Trains, NSW TrainLink)

Services
Preceding station	Intercity Trains	Following station
Tascott towards Newcastle Interchange	Central Coast & Newcastle Line	Woy Woy towards Central
Location

Koolewong railway station is located on the Main Northern line in New South Wales, Australia. It serves the southern Central Coast suburb of Koolewong opening on 29 November 1920.

Koolewong was originally known as Glenrock but the name Koolewong was selected by the NSW Railways and the locality subsequently also became known as Koolewong.

== Platforms and services ==
Koolewong has two side platforms. It is serviced by Sydney Trains Intercity Central Coast & Newcastle Line with services travelling between Sydney Central, Gosford, Wyong & Newcastle via Strathfield. There are 3 weekday morning peak hour services from Wyong to Sydney Central via Gordon.

Platform	Line	Stopping pattern	Notes
1	CCN	Services to Sydney Central via Strathfield	
1	CCN	3 Weekday morning peak hour services to Sydney Central via Gordon	
2	CCN	Services to Gosford, Wyong & Newcastle	

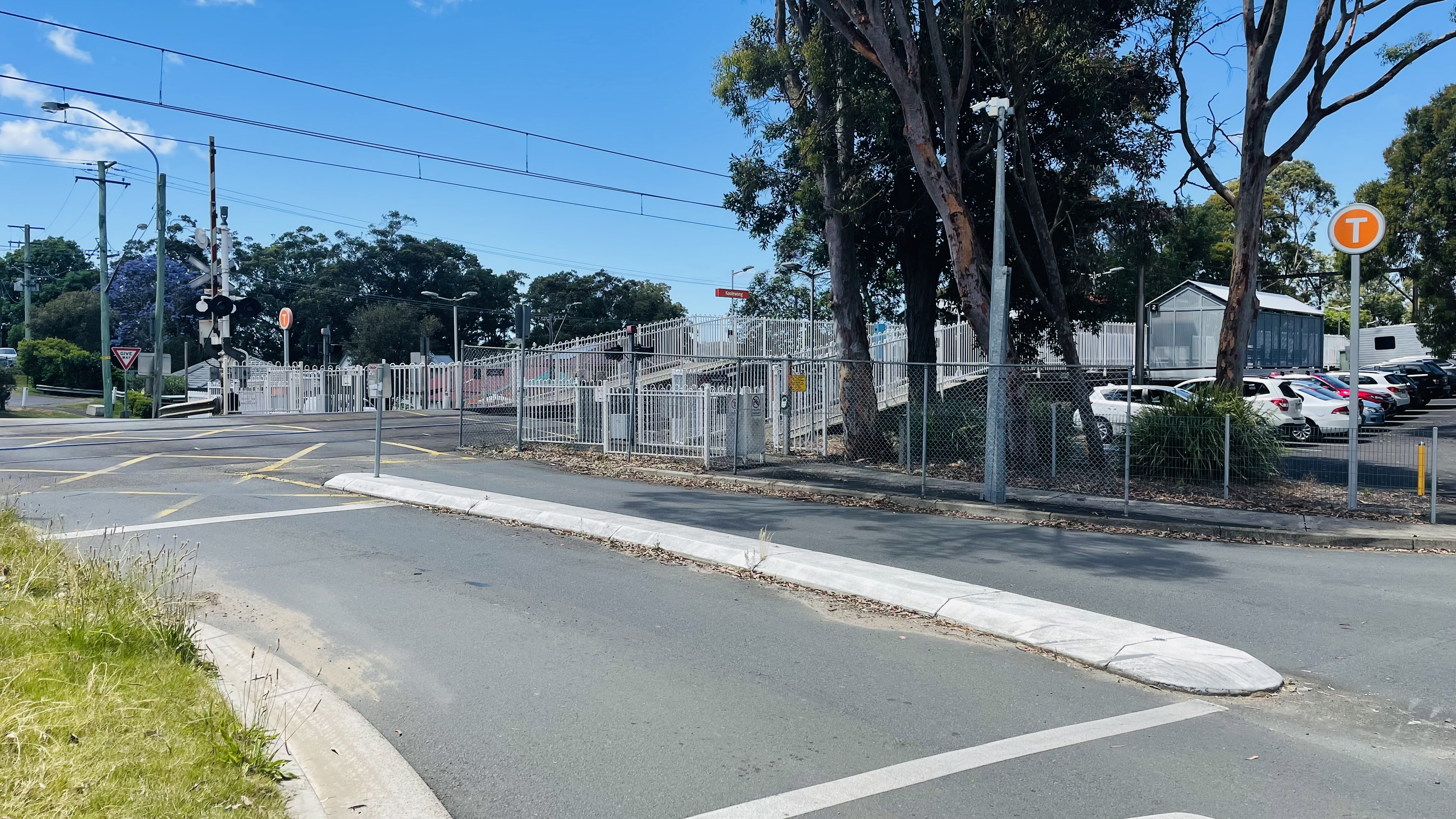
Level crossing and station entrance

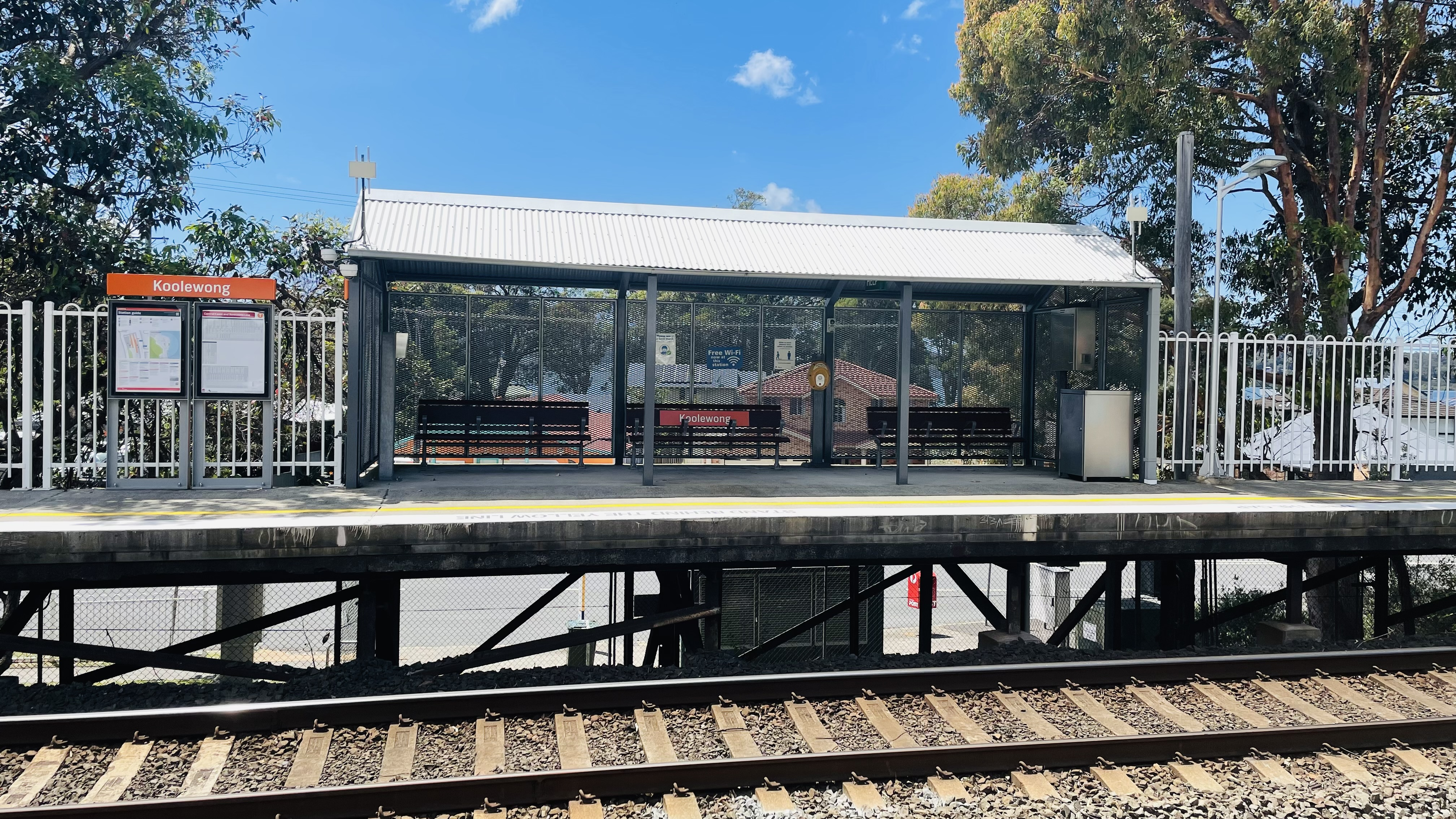
Basic station facilities on platform 1

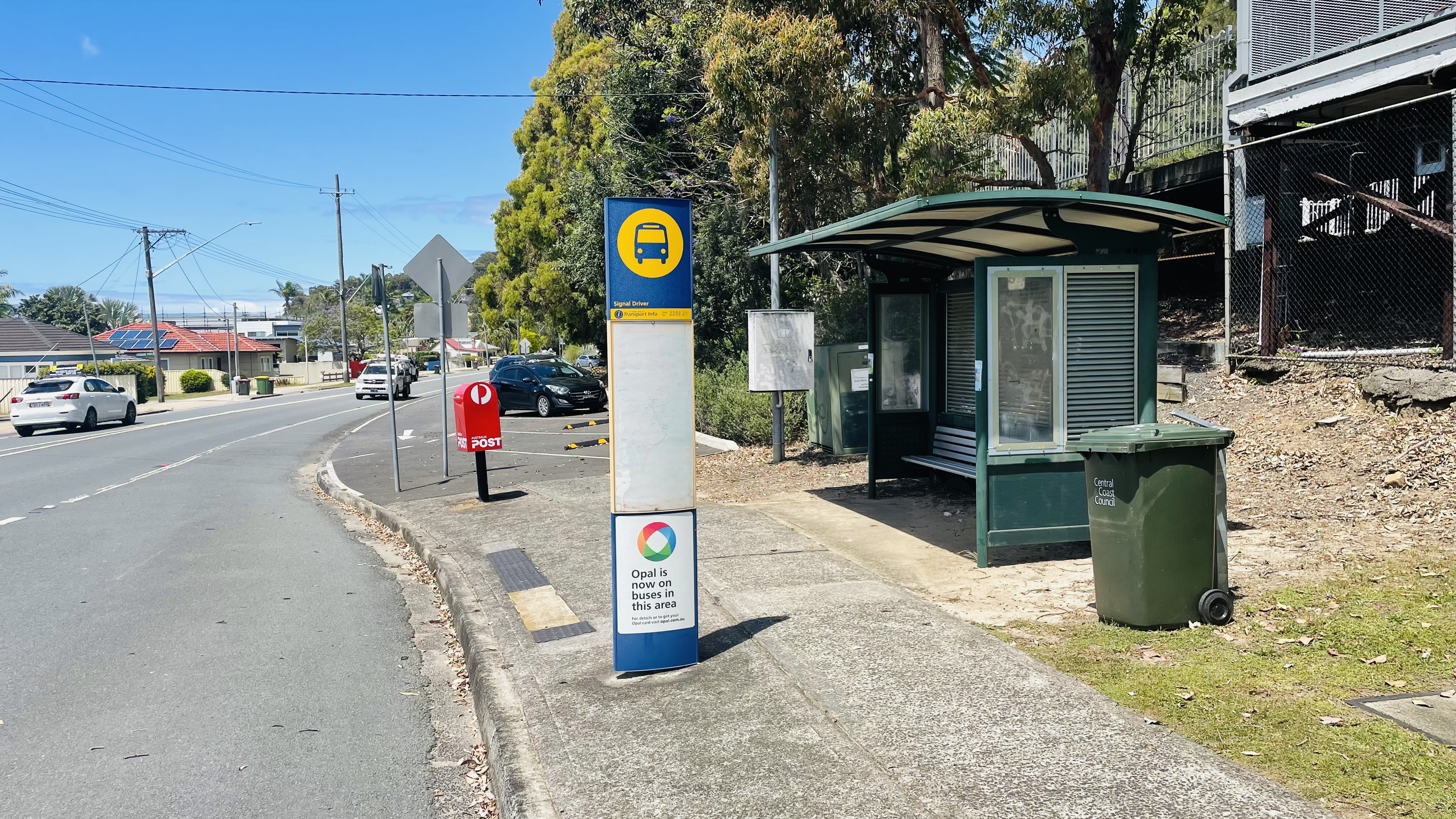
Bus stop on Brisbane Water Drive

== Transport links ==
Busways operates two bus routes via Koolewong station, under contract to Transport for NSW:

- 55: Gosford station to Ettalong Beach
- 70: Gosford station to Ettalong Beach
