= Wondabyne =

Coordinates: 33°29′13″S 151°14′06″E

- Suburb
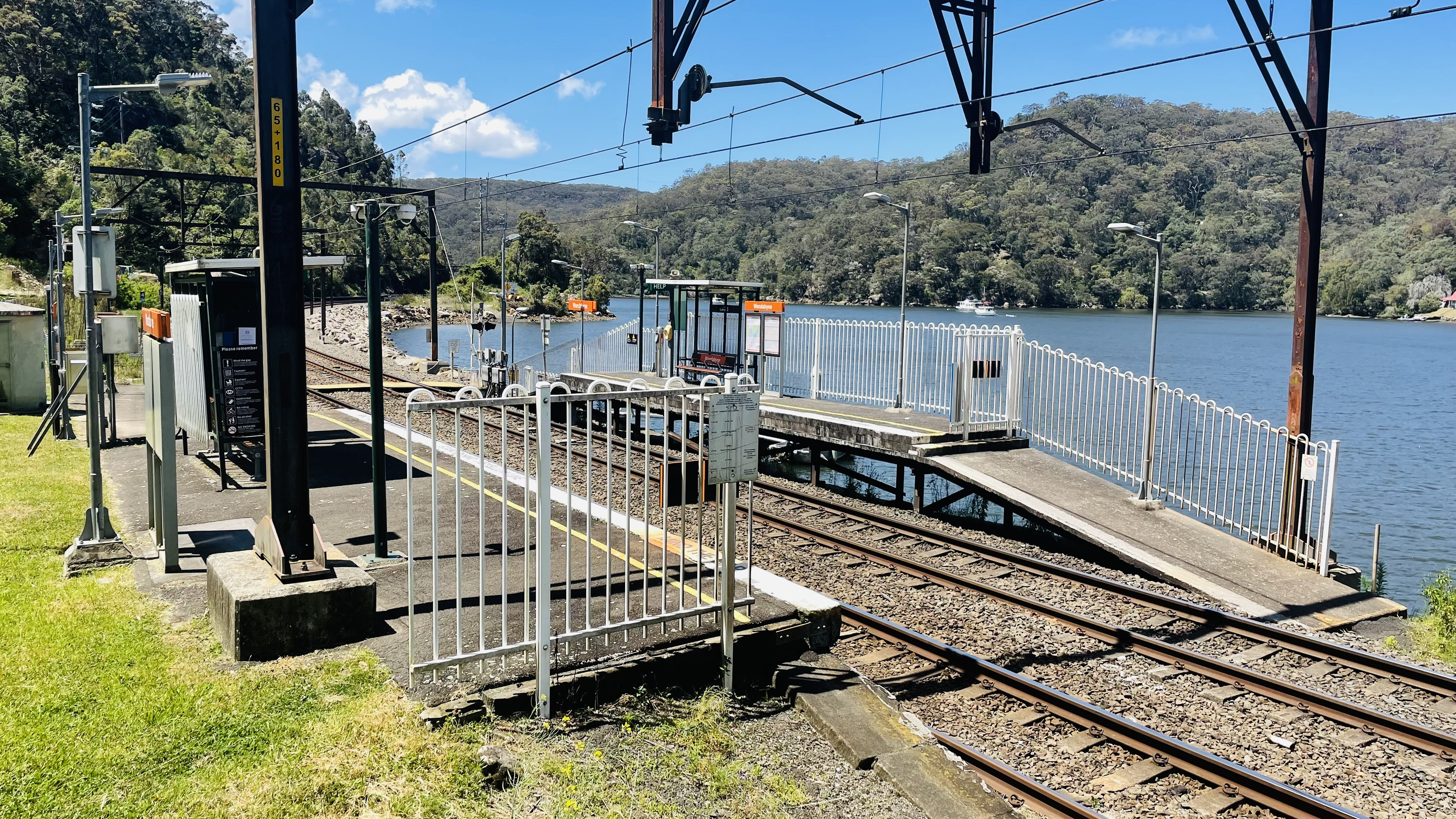
- Wondabyne railway station
- Interactive map of Wondabyne
- Country: Australia
- State: New South Wales
- City: Central Coast
- LGA: Central Coast Council
- Location: 63 km (39 mi) N of Sydney; 16 km (9.9 mi) SW of Gosford

Government
  - State electorate: Gosford
  - Federal division: Robertson
- Elevation: 25 m (82 ft)

Population
  - Total: 3 (SAL 2021)
- Postcode: 2256
- Parish: Patonga
Suburbs around Wondabyne
Mooney Mooney Creek	Kariong	Kariong
Mooney Mooney Creek	Wondabyne	Woy Woy
Mooney Mooney	Cogra Bay	Patonga

Wondabyne is a road-inaccessible locality located in the Central Coast region of New South Wales, Australia, and is part of the Central Coast Council local government area. The river that surrounds Wondabyne is called "Mullet Creek."

Wondabyne railway station is the only railway station in Australia that does not have road access.

The station and Mullet Creek as it flows through the locality starred in the film Oyster Farmer.
