= Tascott railway station =

Railway station in New South Wales, Australia

Tascott
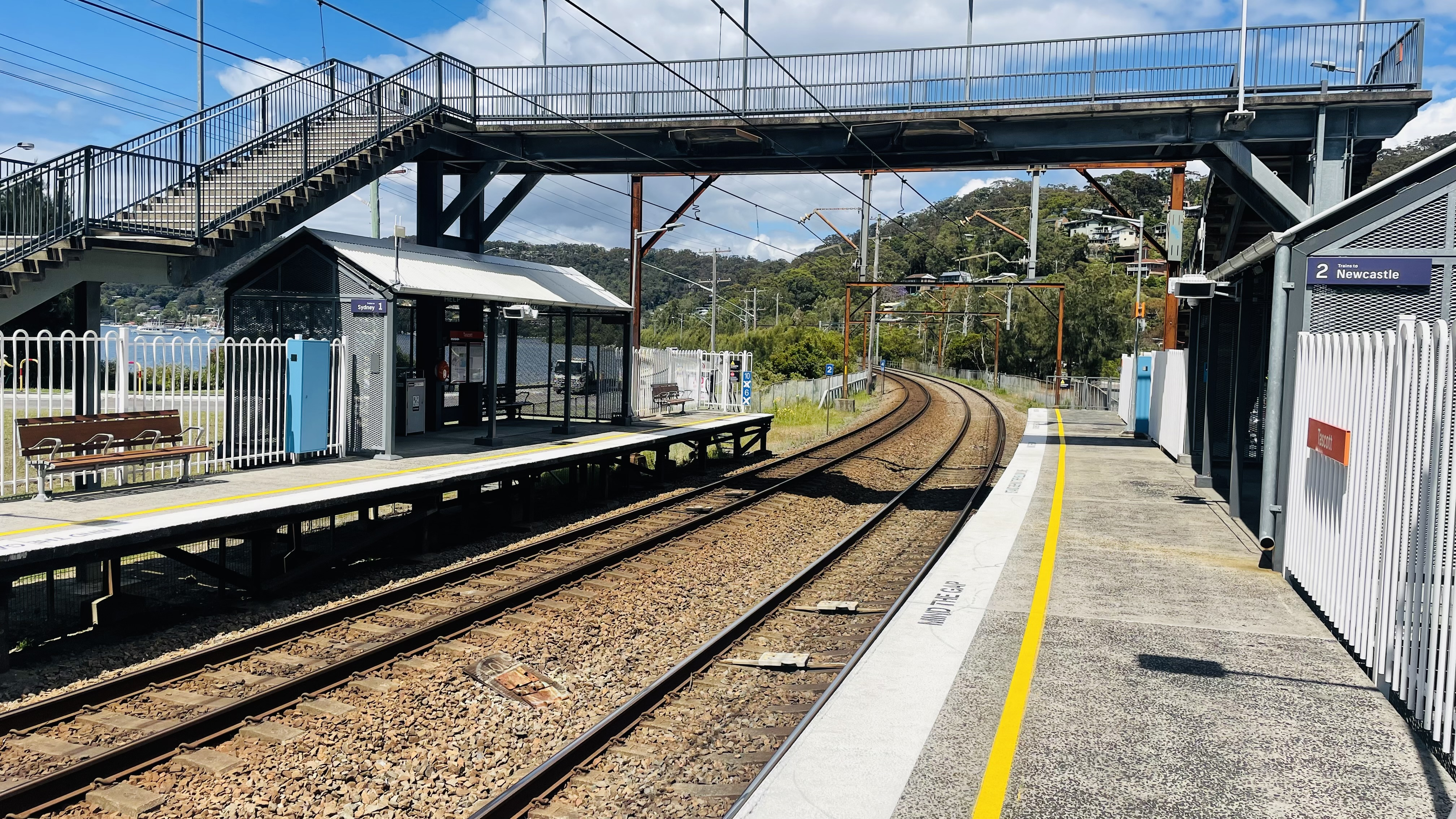
- Southbound view from Platform 2, November 2022

General information
- Location: Brisbane Water Drive, Tascott; Australia
- Coordinates: 33°27′04″S 151°19′08″E
- Elevation: 5 m (16 ft)
- Owner: Transport Asset Manager of New South Wales
- Operator: Sydney Trains
- Line: Main Northern
- Distance: 76.91 km (47.79 mi) from Sydney Central
- Platforms: 2 side
- Tracks: 2
- Connections: Bus

Construction
- Structure type: Ground
- Parking: 53 spaces + 4 disabled spaces
- Accessible: No

Other information
- Station code: TSC
- Website: Transport for NSW

History
- Opened: October 1905; 120 years ago

Passengers
- 2025: 47,050 (year); 129 (daily) (Sydney Trains, NSW TrainLink)

Services
Preceding station	Intercity Trains	Following station
Point Clare towards Newcastle Interchange	Central Coast & Newcastle Line	Koolewong towards Central
Location

Tascott railway station is located on the Main Northern line in New South Wales, Australia. It serves the southern Central Coast suburb of Tascott opening in October 1905.

== Platforms and services ==
Tascott has two side platforms. It is serviced by Sydney Trains Intercity Central Coast & Newcastle Line with services travelling between Sydney Central, Gosford, Wyong & Newcastle via Strathfield. There are 3 weekday morning peak hour services from Wyong to Sydney Central via Gordon.

Platform	Line	Stopping pattern	Notes
1	CCN	Services to Sydney Central via Strathfield	
1	CCN	3 Weekday morning peak hour services to Sydney Central via Gordon	
2	CCN	Services to Gosford, Wyong & Newcastle	

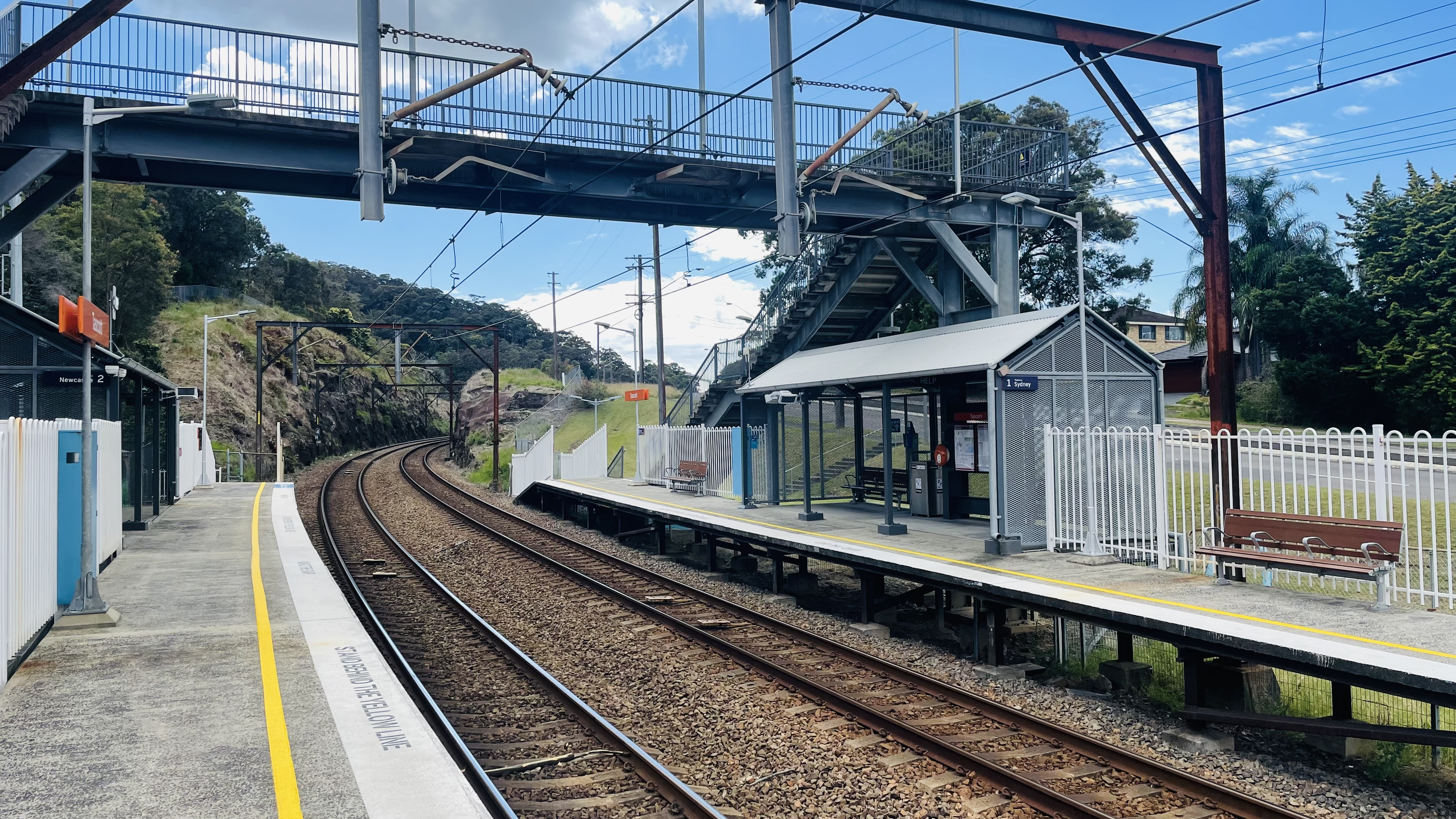
Northbound view from Platform 2

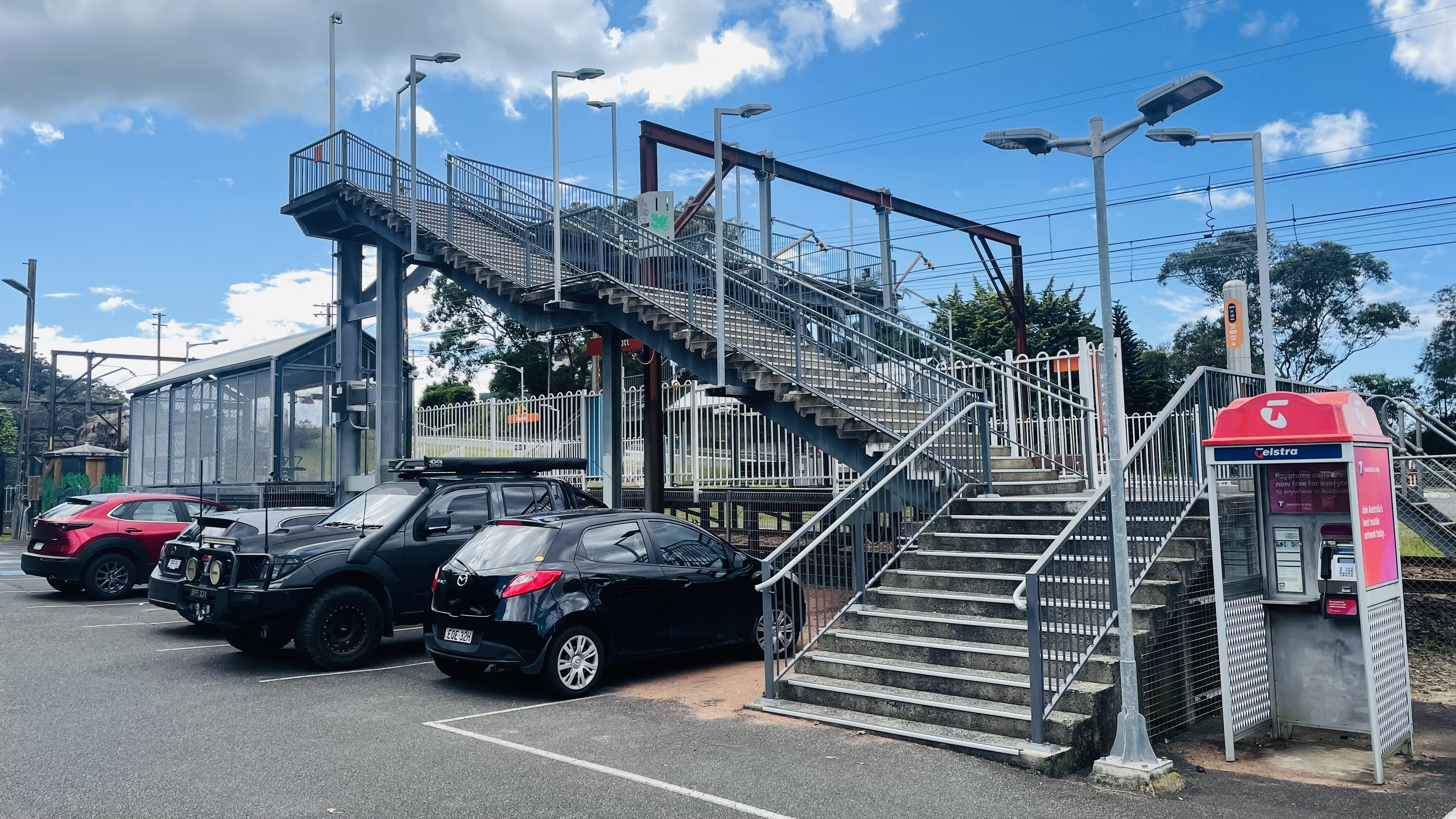
Entrance to station from the carpark

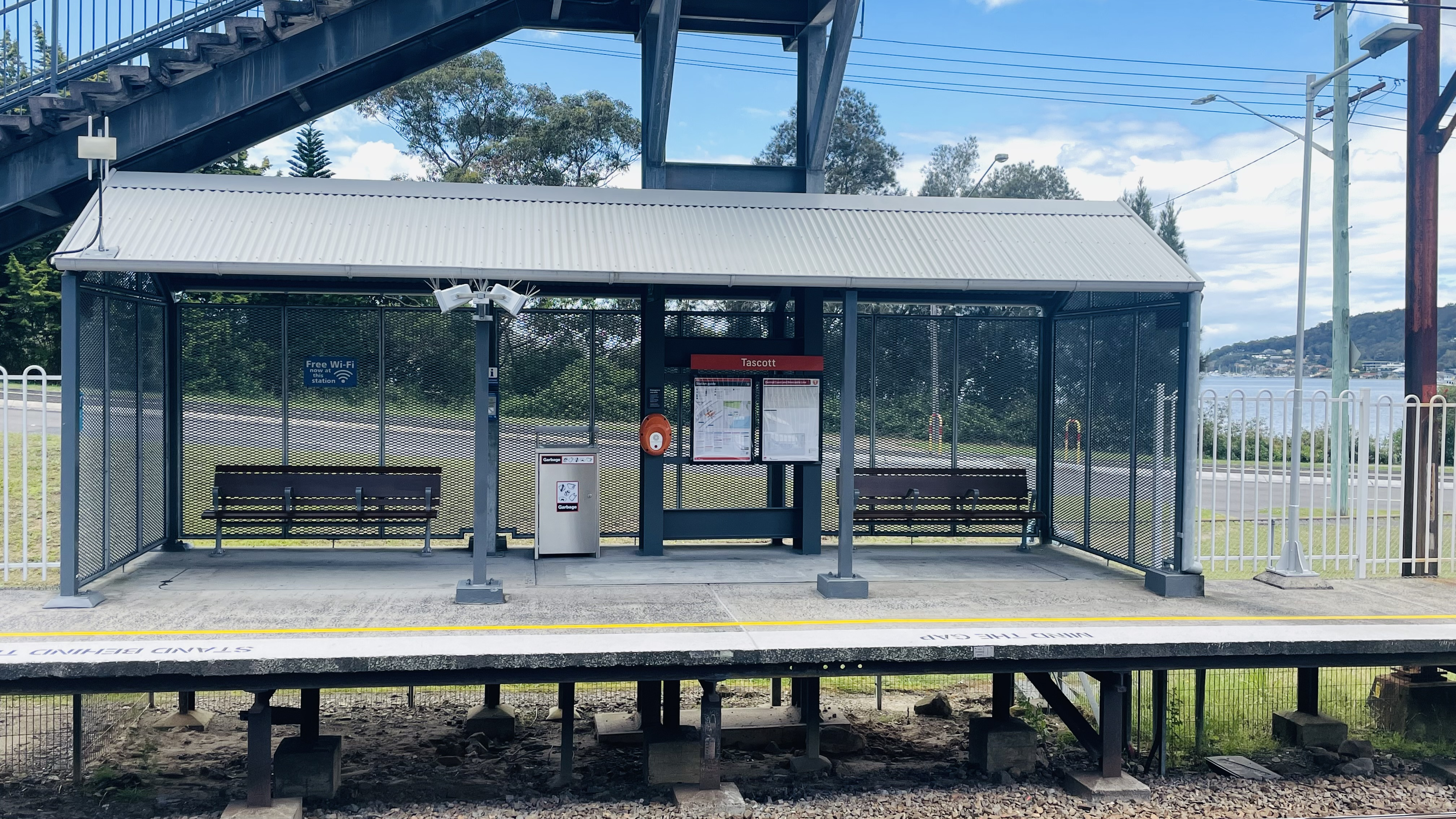
Basic station facilities on Platform 1

== Transport links ==
Busways operates two bus routes via Tascott station, under contract to Transport for NSW:

- 55: Gosford station to Ettalong Beach
- 70: Gosford station to Ettalong Beach
