= Little Wobby =

Suburb on the Central Coast, Australia

Coordinates: 33°32′46″S 151°15′00″E

- Suburb
- Interactive map of Little Wobby
- Country: Australia
- State: New South Wales
- City: Central Coast
- LGA: Central Coast Council
- Location: 22 km (14 mi) SW of Gosford; 10 km (6.2 mi) SW of Woy Woy; 91 km (57 mi) N of Sydney

Government
  - State electorate: Gosford
  - Federal division: Robertson
- Elevation: 22 m (72 ft)

Population
  - Total: 23 (SAL 2021)
- Postcode: 2256
- Parish: Patonga
Suburbs around Little Wobby
Dangar Island	Woy Woy	Patonga
Brooklyn	Little Wobby	Patonga
	Hawkesbury River

Little Wobby is a suburb of the Central Coast region of New South Wales, Australia, located on the north bank of the Hawkesbury River. It is part of the Central Coast Council local government area.

It is the southernmost point of the NSW Central Coast.

== History ==
Little Wobby was originally occupied by the Commonwealth Military Forces during the Second World War. Several buildings were erected along the shoreline to house artillery batteries in case of a Japanese invasion through Broken Bay and the Hawkesbury River. A submarine net was also put in place across the river. Two of these buildings still exist as dwellings, into which they were converted after the war. In the 1970s a plan was mooted for the State government to purchase all of the properties along the shore and demolish the houses in order to rehabilitate the land and return it to being part of the national park. This never went ahead. The only public utilities the houses enjoy are telephone and electricity. There is no town water or sewage connection: these are replaced with water tanks and septic tanks respectively.

The landline is in the Sydney (02) 9XXX-XXXX range; and not the (02) 434X-XXXX range, like the rest of the NSW Central Coast.

== Geography ==
The suburb consists of a 1.5 kilometres (0.93 mi) strip of land along the Hawkesbury, about 1 kilometre (0.6 mi) east of Dangar Island. Development consists of a few residences, most of which are used only as holiday homes. Access to properties is by boat only, as no roads exist in the area.

Most of the suburb's area is part of the Broken Bay Sport and Recreation Centre, a 4-square-kilometre (988-acre) bushland reserve at the mouth of the Hawkesbury River, which offers several walking trails including the Highway Ridge Trail which passes close to the residential area and extends north into the Brisbane Water National Park.
