= Woy Woy railway station =

Railway station in New South Wales

Woy Woy
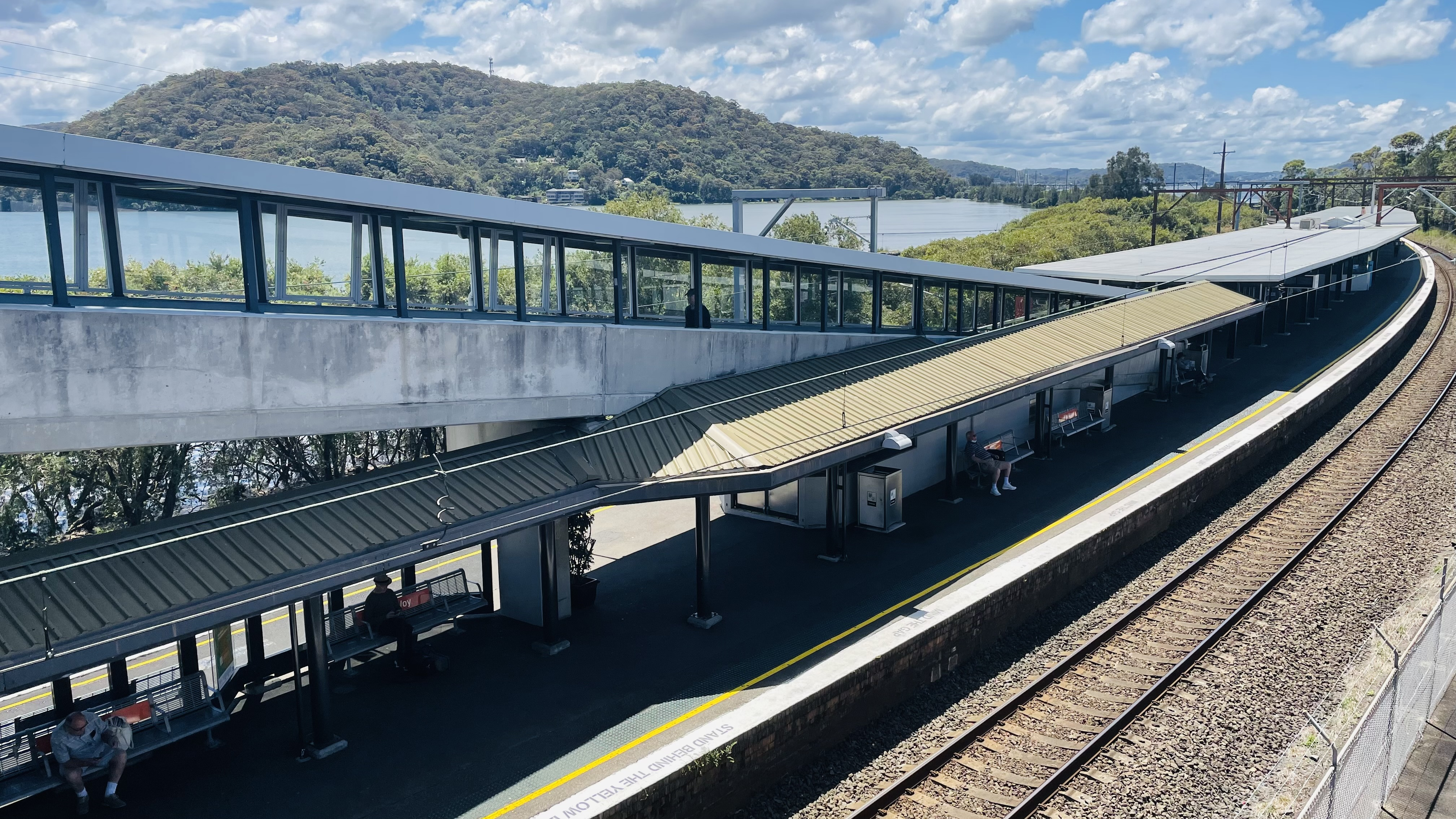
- Northbound view of Platform 2, November 2022

General information
- Location: Railway Street, Woy Woy; Australia
- Coordinates: 33°29′03″S 151°19′27″E
- Elevation: 3 m (9.8 ft)
- Owner: Transport Asset Manager of New South Wales
- Operator: Sydney Trains
- Line: Main Northern
- Distance: 72.62 km (45.12 mi) from Sydney Central
- Platforms: 2 (1 island)
- Tracks: 2
- Connections: Bus

Construction
- Structure type: Ground
- Accessible: Yes

Other information
- Status: Staffed
- Station code: WOY
- Website: Transport for NSW

History
- Opened: 1 February 1889; 137 years ago

Passengers
- 2025: 1,798,126 (year); 4,926 (daily) (Sydney Trains, NSW TrainLink)

Services
Preceding station	Intercity Trains	Following station
Koolewong towards Newcastle Interchange	Central Coast & Newcastle Line	Wondabyne towards Central
Gosford towards Wyong	Central Coast & Newcastle Line Weekday peak via Gordon	Wondabyne towards Central
Koolewong towards Gosford	Central Coast & Newcastle Line Weekday peak via Gordon	Berowra towards Central
Gosford towards Newcastle Interchange	Central Coast & Newcastle Line Express	Hornsby towards Central
Location

Woy Woy railway station is located on the Main Northern line in New South Wales, Australia. It serves the southern Central Coast town of Woy Woy and opened on 1 February 1889.

== History ==
It was constructed on 1 February 1889 as part of the final part of the connection between Gosford and Hawkesbury River. The railway line through the station was electrified in January 1960. The station received an easy access upgrade and a lift between April 1996 and September 1998.

== Platforms and services ==
Woy Woy has one island platform with two faces. It is serviced by Sydney Trains Intercity Central Coast & Newcastle Line with services travelling between Sydney Central, Gosford, Wyong & Newcastle via Strathfield. There are 6 weekday morning peak hour services from Gosford & Wyong to Sydney Central via Gordon.

Intercity services come every thirty minutes off-peak hour and on weekends, every seven minutes during the morning and evening weekday peak hour (morning peak hour south and afternoon peak hour north).

Platform	Line	Stopping pattern	Notes
1	CCN	Services to Sydney Central via Strathfield	
1	CCN	6 Weekday morning peak hour services to Sydney Central via Gordon	
2	CCN	Services to Gosford, Wyong & Newcastle	

There are two crossovers south of the station, allowing trains to terminate in an emergency. They cannot be used for regular working as they are manually operated by levers next to the tracks and there are no signals to permit any movements over the points. All signals at this station are controlled from Gosford.

There is a small kiosk in the concourse that is normally open in the morning selling drinks and snacks.

The concourse has a pedestrian bridge over Railway Street to a large multi-story commuter car park. There are no ticketing requirements to park in this structure.

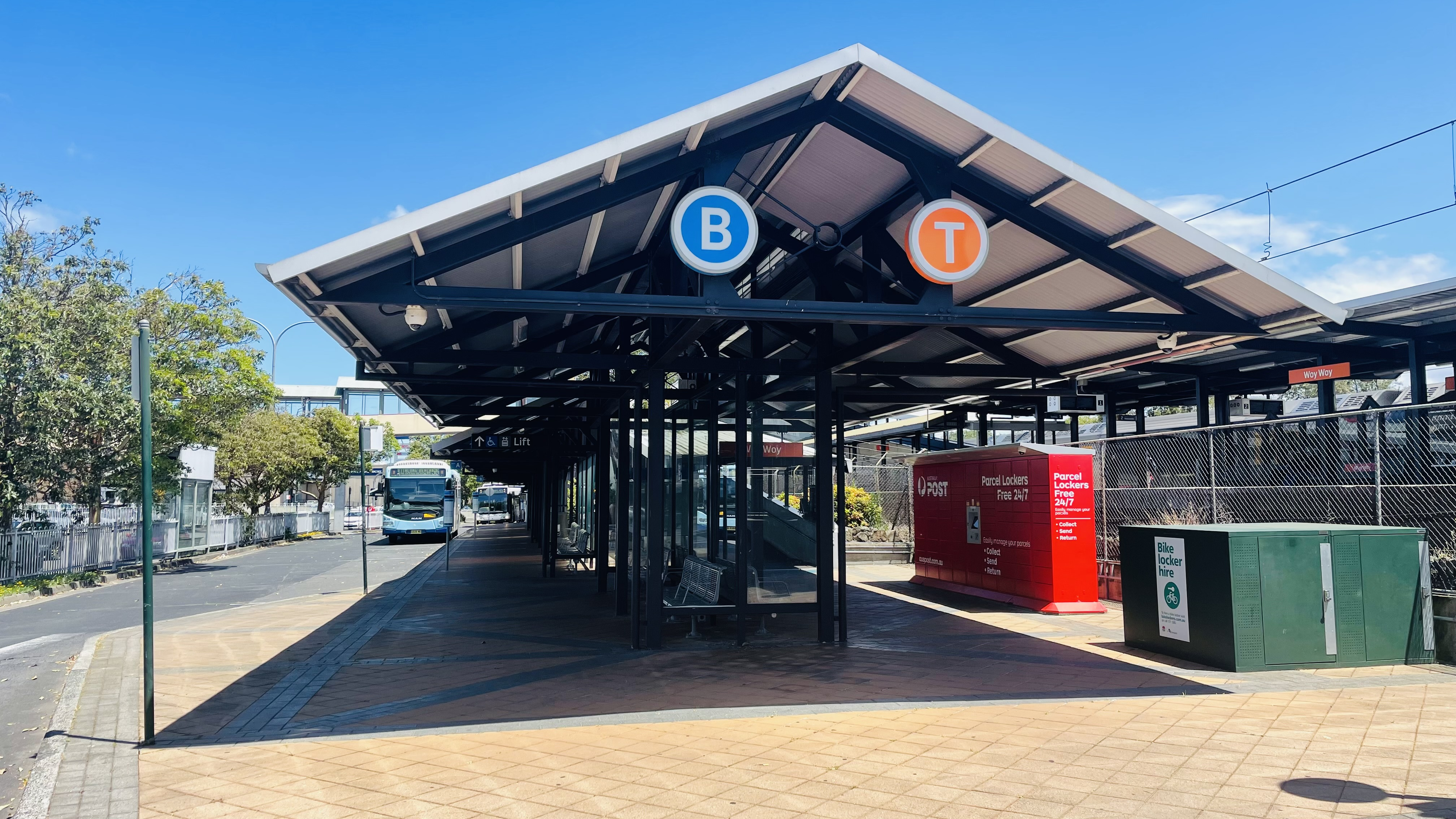
Bus Terminal

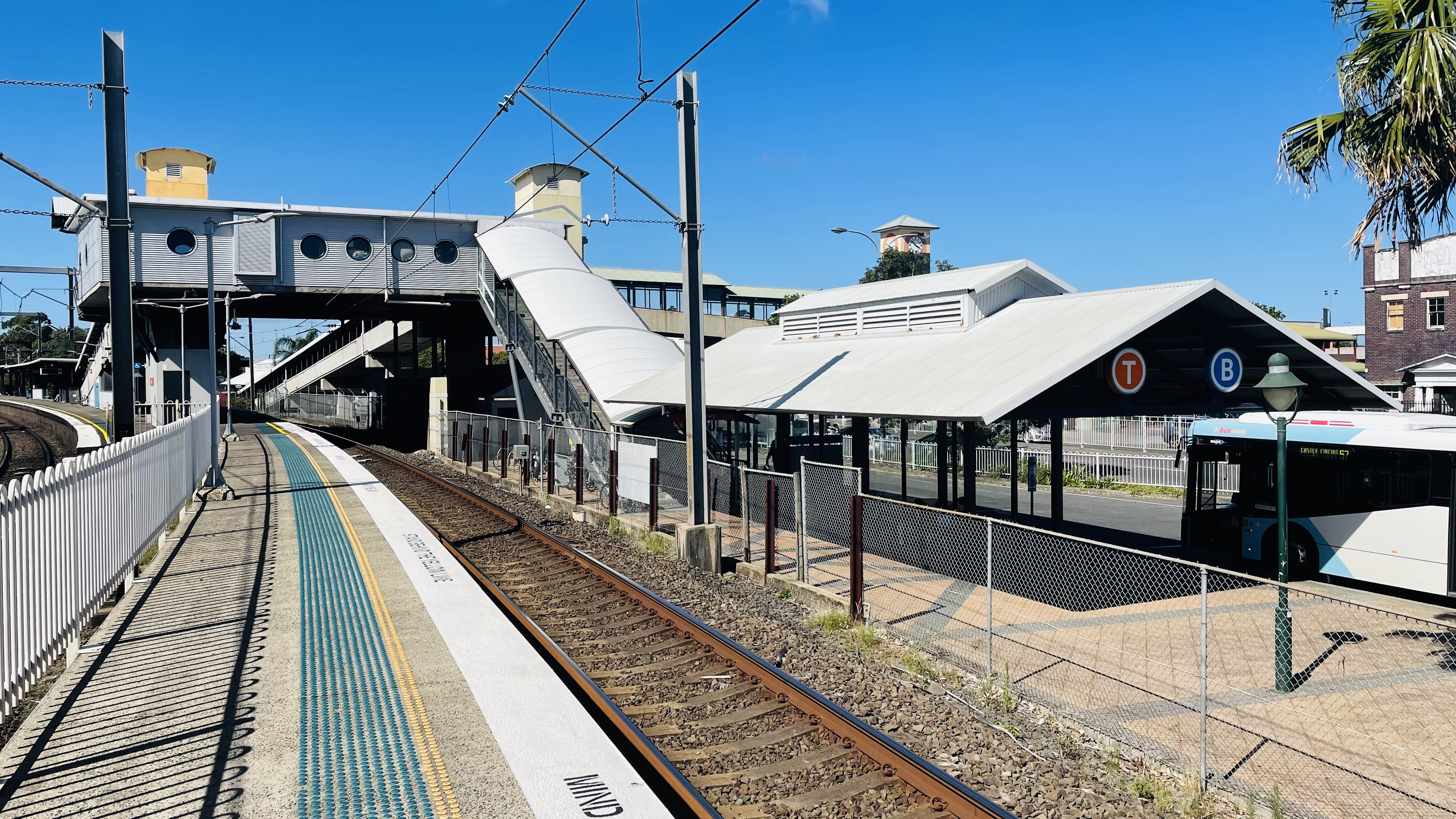
Northbound view from Platform 1

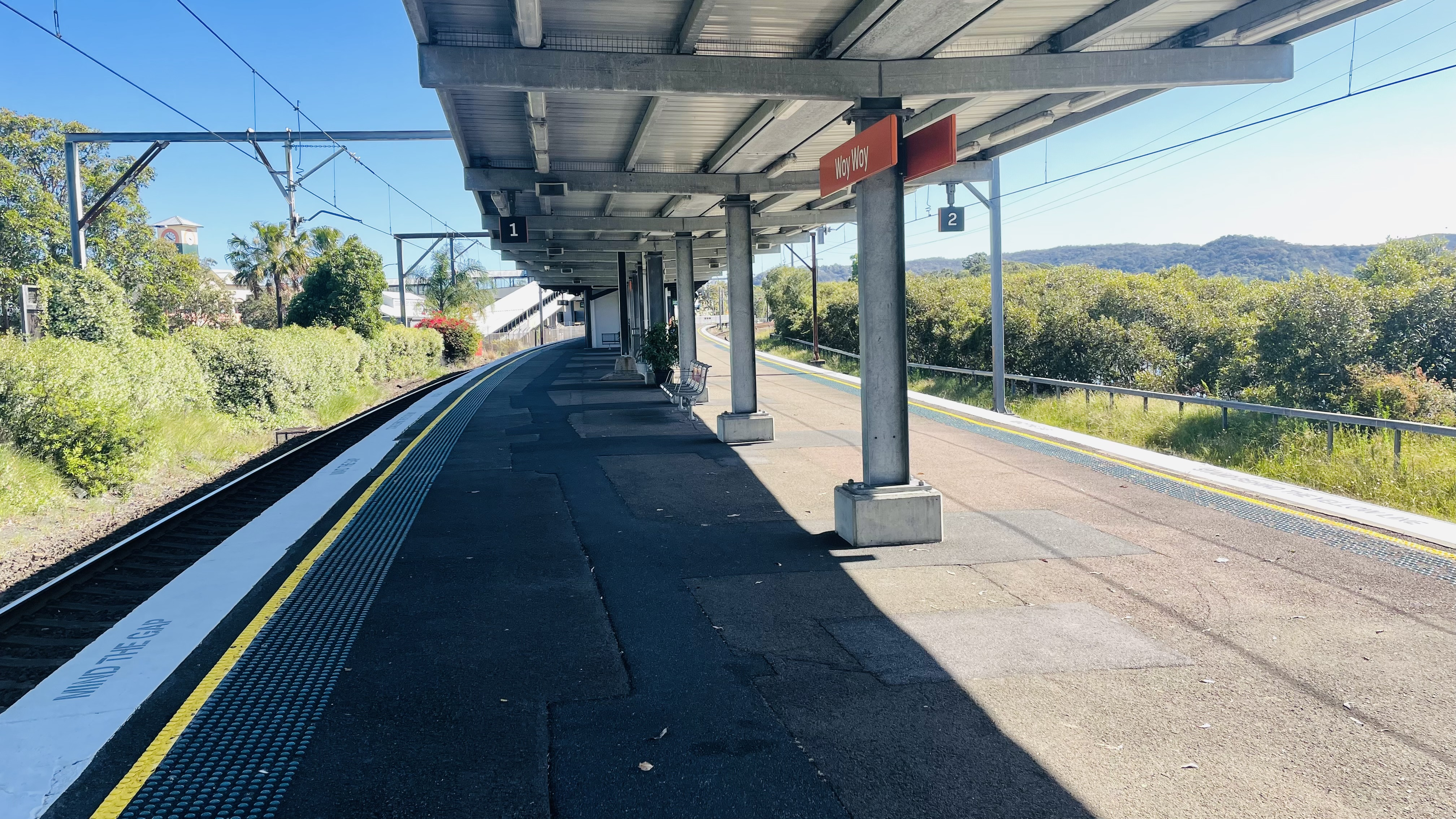
Southbound view

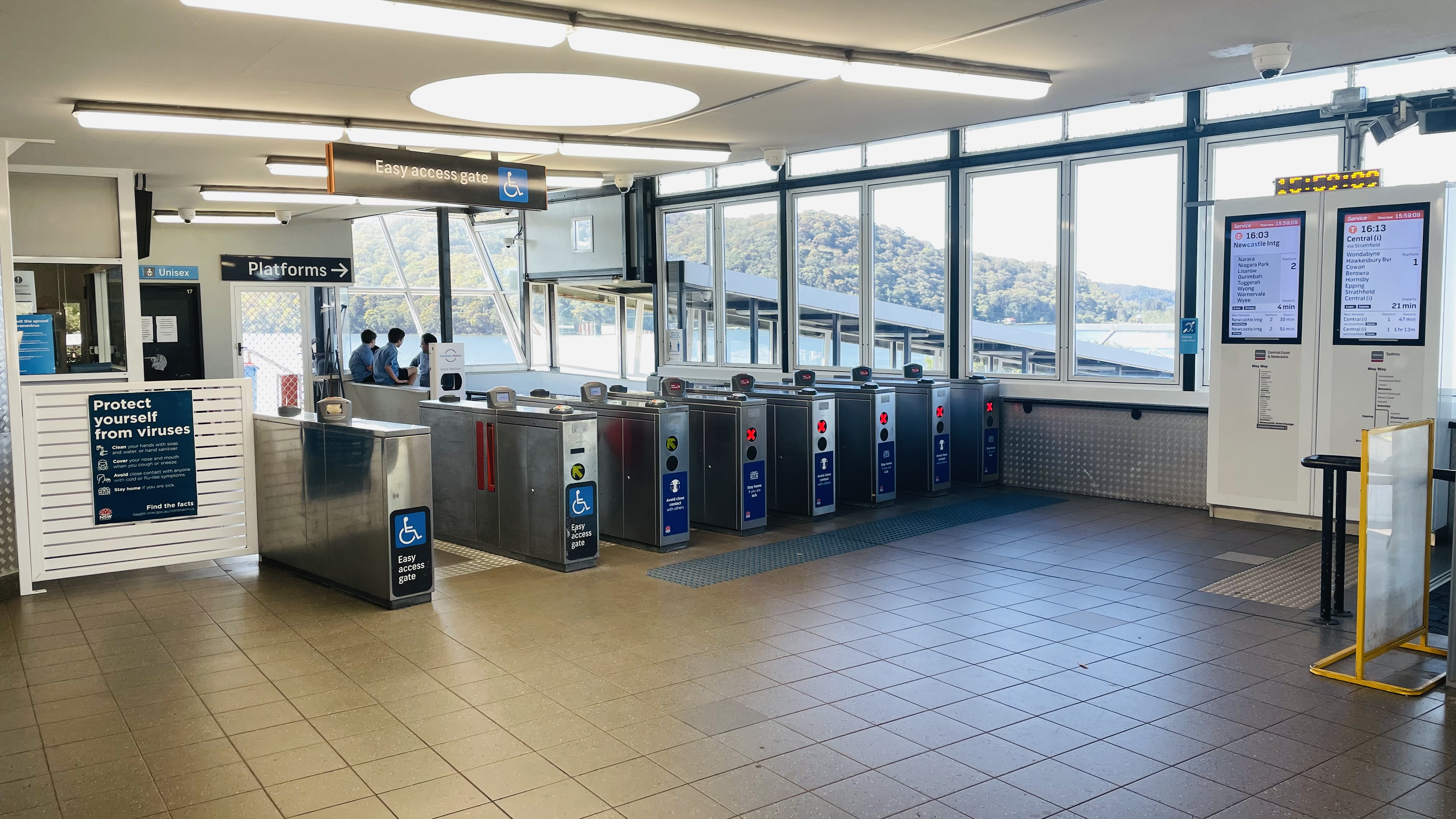
Ticket barriers and service indicators on the concourse
