= Wondabyne railway station =

Australian railway station

Wondabyne
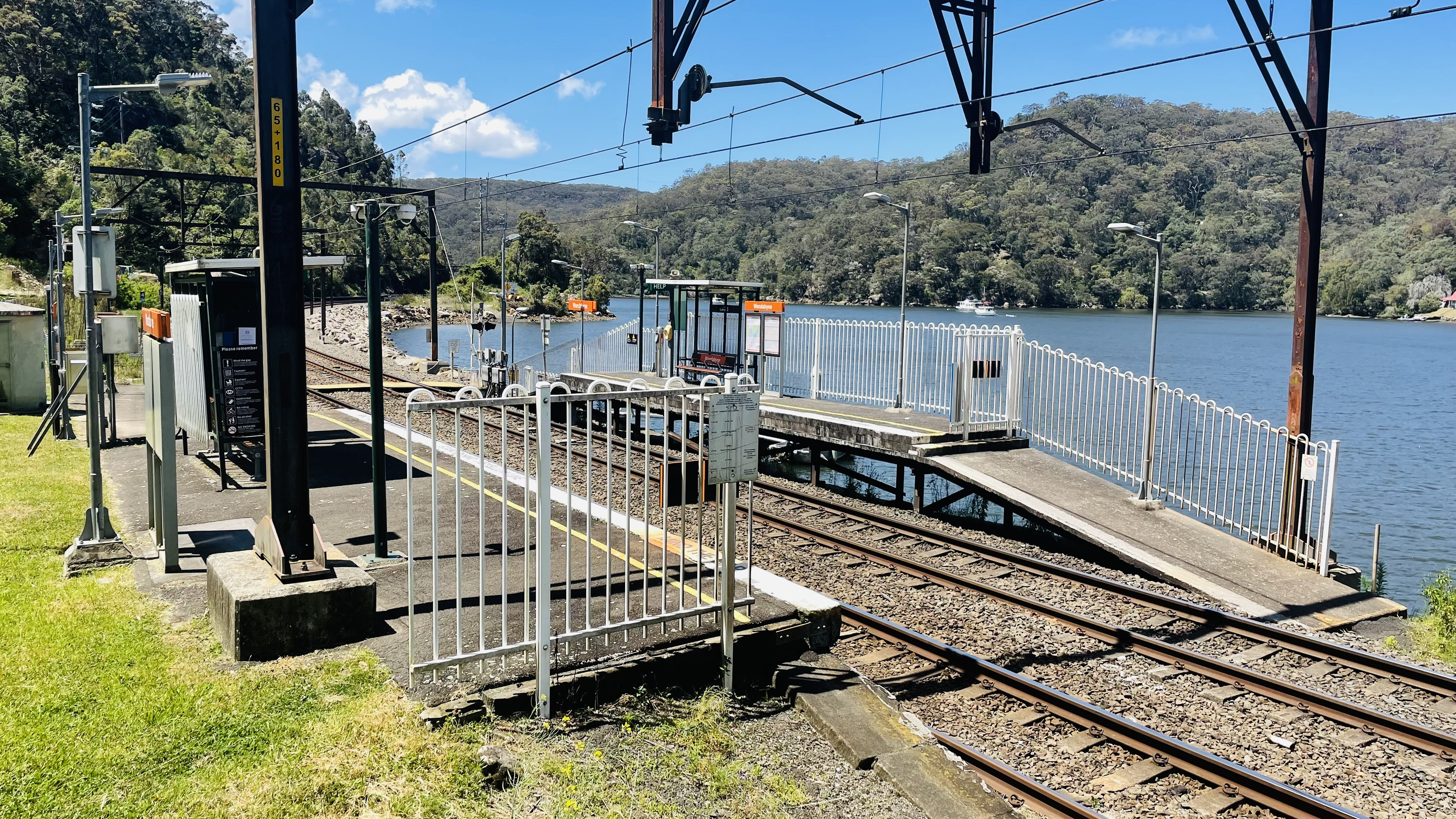
- Northbound view near Platform 2, November 2022

General information
- Location: Mullet Creek, Wondabyne; Australia
- Coordinates: 33°29′32″S 151°15′25″E
- Elevation: 5 m (16 ft)
- Owner: Transport Asset Manager of New South Wales
- Operator: Sydney Trains
- Line: Main Northern
- Distance: 65.15 km (40.48 mi) from Sydney Central
- Platforms: 2 side
- Tracks: 2

Construction
- Structure type: Ground
- Parking: No
- Accessible: No

Other information
- Station code: WDB
- Website: Transport for NSW

History
- Opened: 1 May 1889; 137 years ago
- Former names: Mullet Creek Junction (1889–1890); Hawkesbury Cabin (1890–1891)

Passengers
- 2025: 8,842 (year); 24 (daily) (Sydney Trains, NSW TrainLink)

Services
Preceding station	Intercity Trains	Following station
Woy Woy towards Newcastle Interchange	Central Coast & Newcastle Line	Hawkesbury River towards Central
Location

Wondabyne railway station is a heritage-listed railway station and request stop located on the Main Northern line in New South Wales, Australia. It serves the southern Central Coast area known as Wondabyne and opened on 1 May 1889. It is the only station in Australia that does not have road access.

Wondabyne station is mainly used by trail goers on the Great North Walk and the homeowners who live on the other side of Mullet Creek which is a tributary of the Hawkesbury River. It is a favoured spot of trainspotters. The area has a quarry that is used intermittently and several houses which can only be accessed by boat from a jetty next to the station.

== History ==
Wondabyne station was constructed with the Hawkesbury River Railway Bridge. Between 1888 and 1897, before the bridge opened, and after Woy Woy Tunnel was opened, railway traffic took a ferry from a temporary dead end at Mullet Creek, 400 metres north of Wondabyne station.

The station was originally opened as Mullet Creek Junction, after the nearby creek, as the station was built for its development of the quarry. It was renamed Hawkesbury Cabin in 1890 and finally Wondabyne on 15 January 1891 after Mt. Wondabyne close to the railway station across the bay.

Wondabyne was also renowned for its maritime transport industry. Along its creek are squatter houses which housed fishermen; the area is still used for recreational fishing. Wondabyne was once a busy area and had a pub called The Centennial, which closed in 1891 shortly after the Hawkesbury River Railway Bridge was opened. There were also steamboat services, which took passengers from Wondabyne station along the Hawkesbury River to Brooklyn.

In April 1939, Wondabyne station was relocated to the current site.

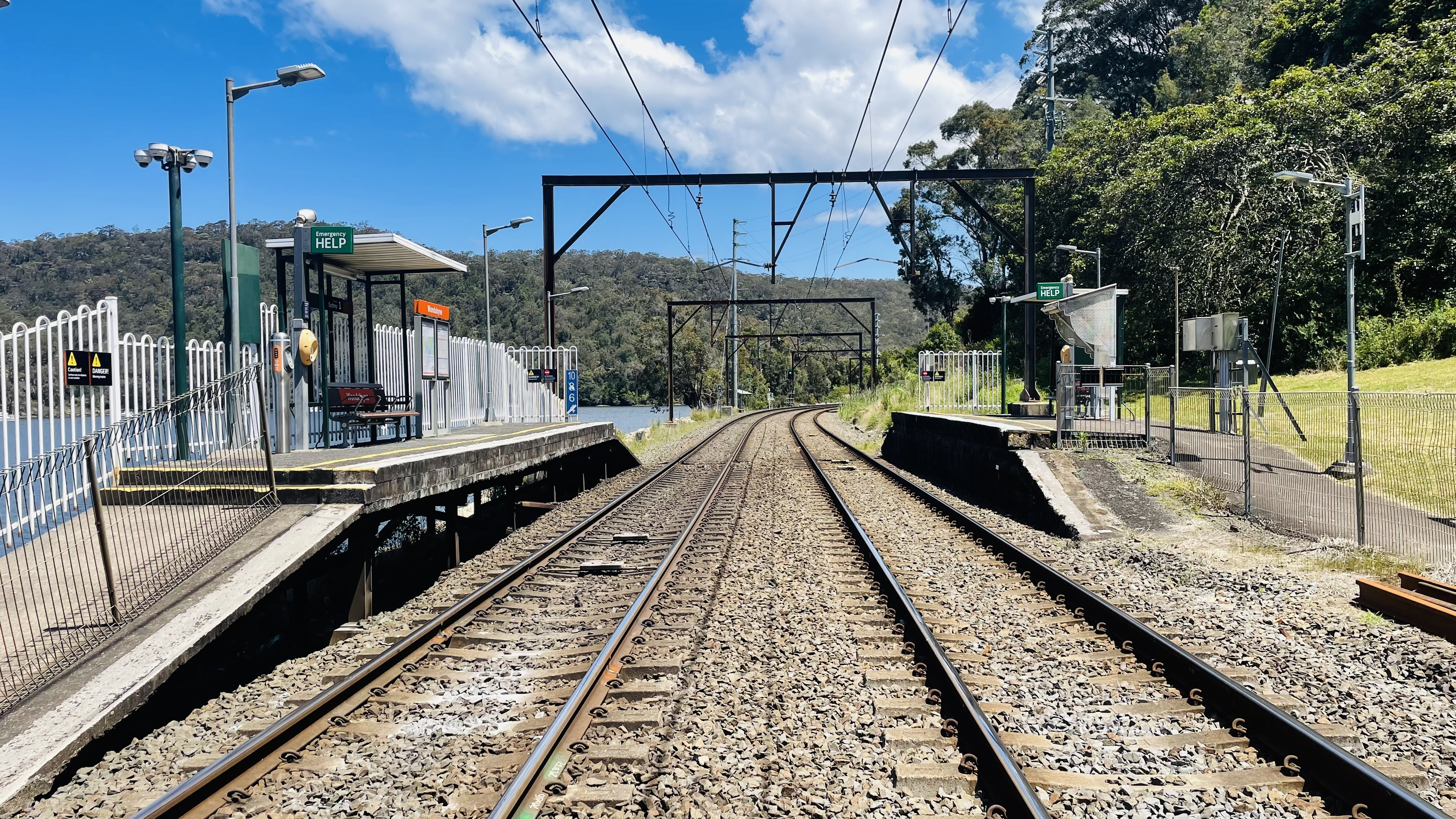
View south from the level crossing

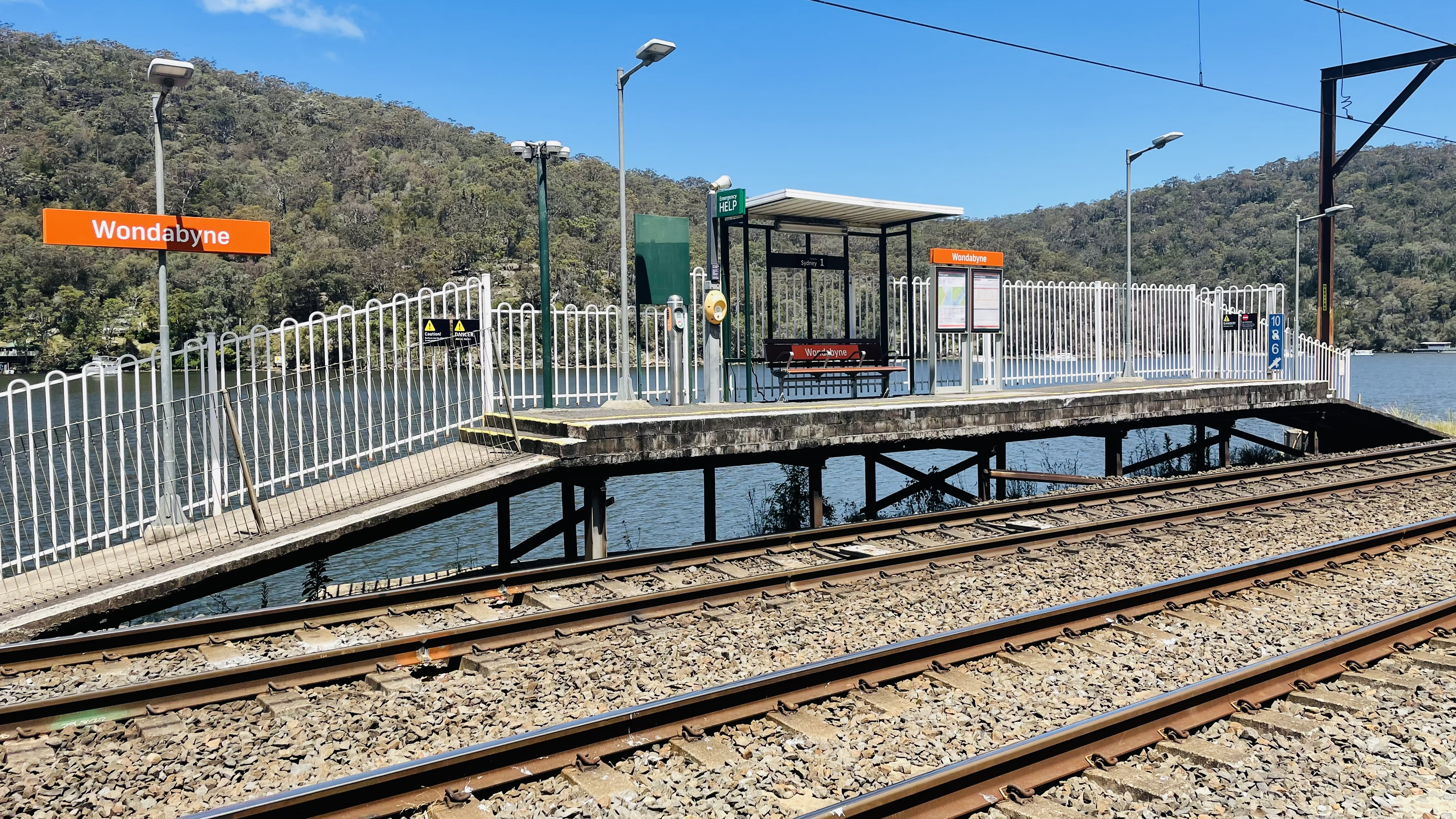
Platform 1

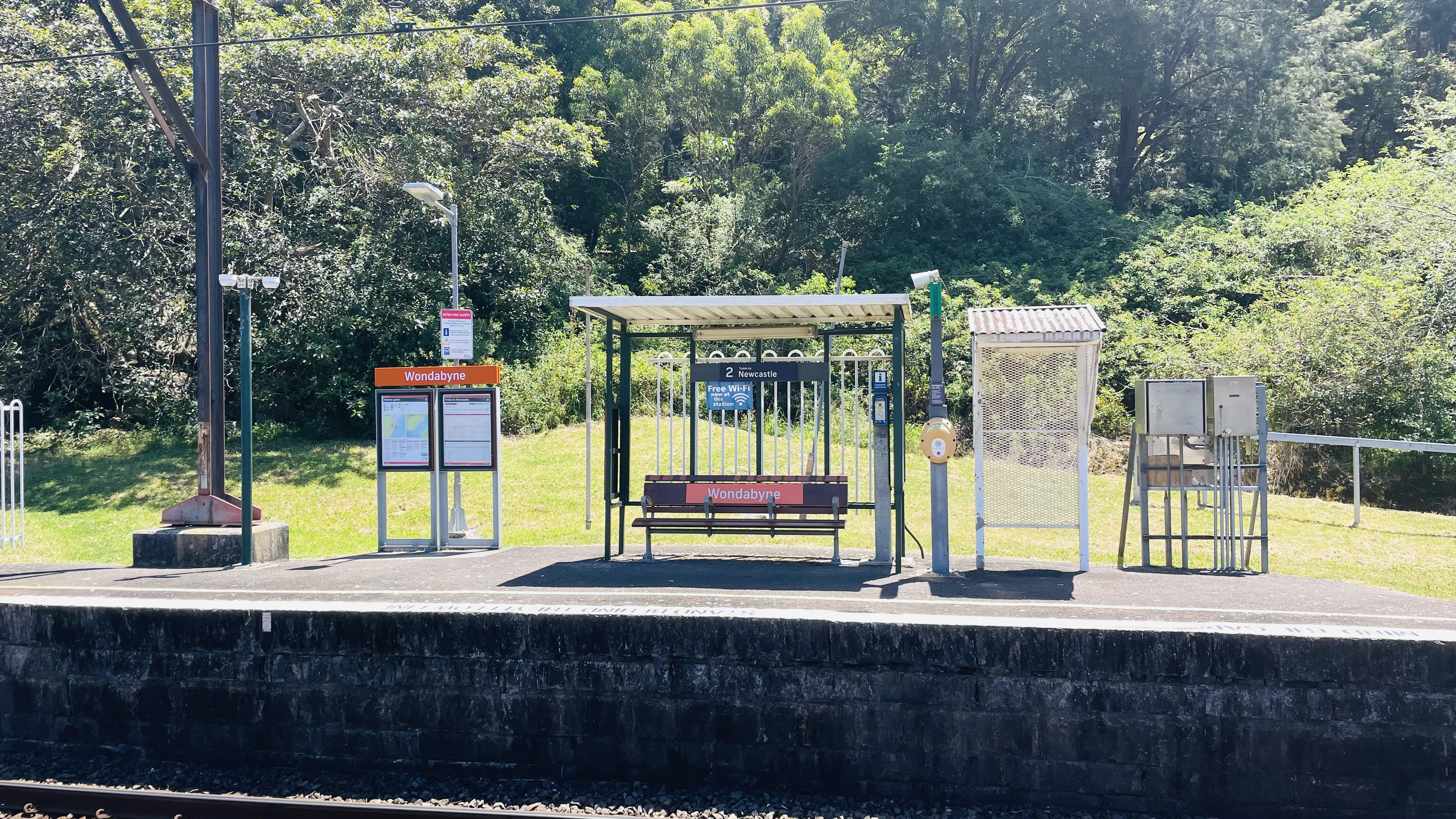
Platform 2

== Platforms and services ==
Wondabyne has two side platforms. It is serviced by Sydney Trains Intercity Central Coast & Newcastle Line with services travelling between Sydney Central, Gosford, Wyong & Newcastle via Strathfield. There are 3 weekday morning peak hour services from Gosford to Sydney Central via Gordon.

Despite the station's short length – less than one carriage long – it is fully equipped with an Opal card reader, announcements of approaching trains, security cameras, printed timetables and other posters relevant to the railways such as safety messaging. The platforms are classified as SP1r (Alight from last car's rear door). This station is one example of train stations that uses selective door operation due to trains only stopping at this station on request.

Wondabyne is a request stop with passengers required to notify the train guard if they wish to alight and wave at the driver if they want to board. In both cases the rear door of the rear carriage corresponds with the platform.

Platform	Line	Stopping pattern	Notes
1	Central Coast & Newcastle Line	Services to Sydney Central via Strathfield	Request stop
1	Central Coast & Newcastle Line	3 Weekday morning peak hour services to Sydney Central via Gordon	Request stop
2	Central Coast & Newcastle Line	Services to Gosford, Wyong & Newcastle	Request stop
