= Patonga, New South Wales =

Coordinates: 33°32′56″S 151°16′05″E

Patonga Central Coast, New South Wales
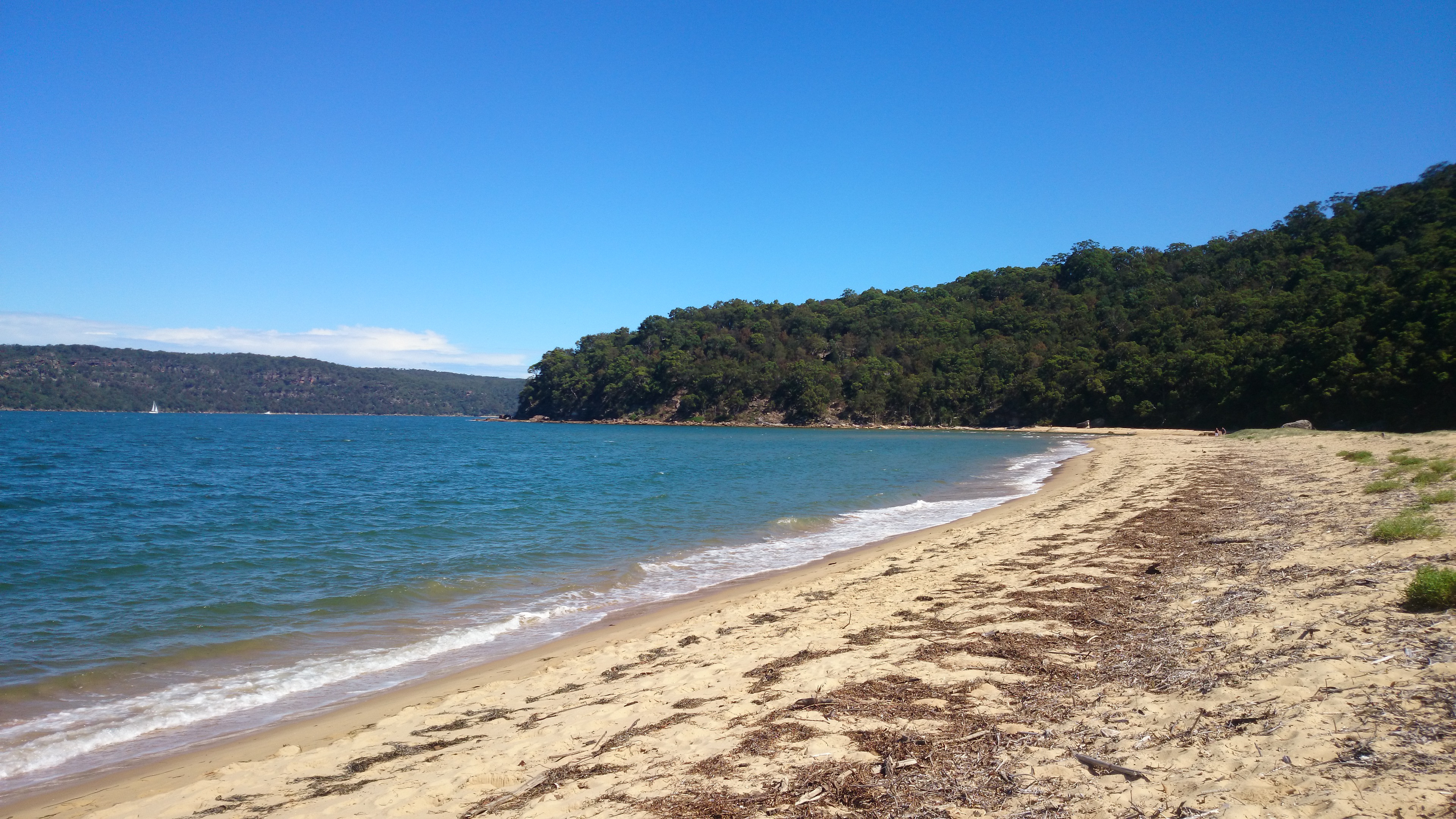
- Population: 206 (2016 census)
- Postcode(s): 2256
- Elevation: 4 m (13 ft)
- Location: 24 km (15 mi) SSW of Gosford; 12 km (7 mi) SSW of Woy Woy; 94 km (58 mi) N of Sydney
- LGA(s): Central Coast Council
- Parish: Patonga
- State electorate(s): Gosford
- Federal division(s): Robertson
Suburbs around Patonga:
Little Wobby	Brisbane Water National Park	Pearl Beach
Little Wobby	Patonga	Lion Island
Broken Bay Sport & Recreation Centre	Hawkesbury River	Broken Bay

Patonga is a small beach side fishing and holiday village which is part of the Central Coast region of New South Wales, Australia, located on the edge of Brisk Bay and near the mouth of the Hawkesbury River. It is part of the Central Coast Council local government area. Patonga is the southern most village of the Central Coast.

== Geography ==
Patonga is a small and quiet bayside community occupying a one kilometre long sandy spit projecting from the rocky and elevated headland of the Brisbane Water National Park to the north through to the spit at the mouth of the Patonga Creek which feeds into the Hawkesbury River at Broken Bay. Patonga has both a beach frontage onto Brisk Bay to the east and a sandy foreshore on the creek to the west.

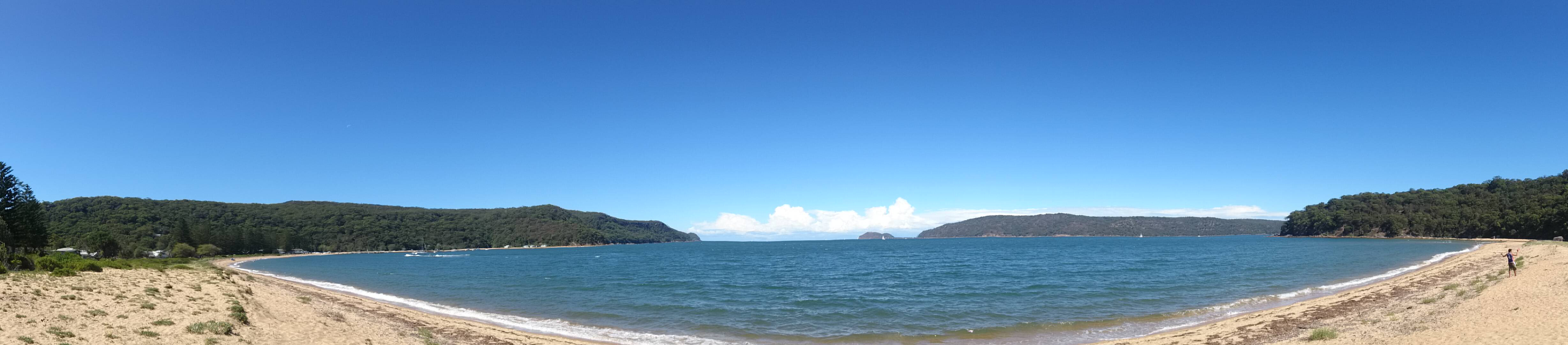
Patonga, NSW

Patonga can be accessed by road along Patonga Drive from Umina to the north, by ferry from Palm Beach or by private watercraft.

The community extends to housing, accessible only by watercraft, which occupies Patonga Creek's foreshore on the opposite bank. Various bush tracks provide hiking access to Patonga and the surrounding reserves. Patonga also has a walking track of medium difficulty which leads to neighbouring Pearl Beach.

Patonga still operates as a fishing village but is also home to weekenders escaping from Sydney and holiday makers.

The Patonga Creek was once navigable by fairly large vessels, but now averages about half a metre in depth.

The nearby towns of Umina Beach and Ettalong Beach are significant neighbouring communities which provide many facilities and services not available at Patonga.

== Origin of name ==
Patonga means "oyster" in the Darkinjung people's language. Early English language maps of the area spelt Patonga as "Betonga".

== Local industry and facilities ==
Oyster farming is the main local industry along with eco-tourism and recreational tourism.

Visitors from the Central coast, day trippers from Palm Beach, wider Sydney, Newcastle, and other areas of the NSW provide customers to the Boathouse Hotel and Kiosk. The hotel has a tavern with a restaurant and some accommodation The town also has as a handful of art galleries.

Recreational facilities and infrastructure include a sports oval, a public boat ramp to the eastern end of the village, tennis courts, a public wharf and a two-hectare camping and caravan park located at the southern end of the village (accessed by Patonga and Bay Streets). The wharf is also used by commercially operated ferries providing services to Palm Beach and Newport on the Northern Beaches.

Visitors to Patonga can take advantage of the opportunity for canoeing, boating, fishing and hiking.

== Patonga and the film industry ==
Patonga provided the setting for the fishing village of Graves Point in the 1996 television movie loosely based on Peter Benchley's novel, 'The Beast', a sci-fi horror-drama in which a rare giant squid threatens a small seaport community. The featured sea-side cottage near the wharf was constructed as a film set and demolished on completion. Patonga has also featured in many other movies and TV shows such as Oyster Farmer, Micro Nation, Home and Away and many other big known titles.
