= Rip Bridge =

Bridge in New South Wales, Australia

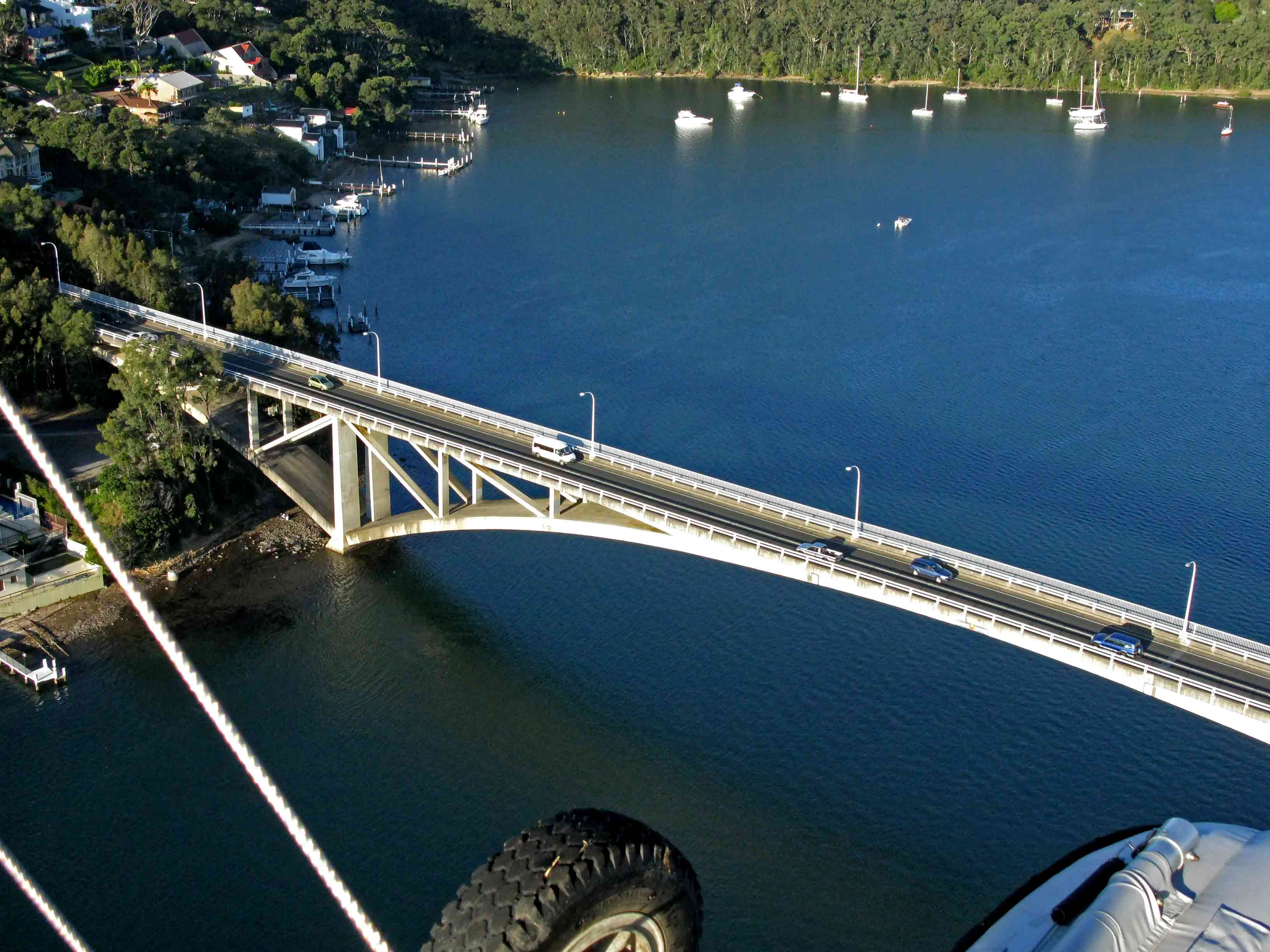
- Coordinates: 33.5069°S 151.3467°E
- Carries: Maitland Bay Drive
- Crosses: Brisbane Water
- Begins: Booker Bay
- Ends: Daleys Point
- Owner: Transport for NSW

Characteristics
- Material: Prestressed concrete
- Total length: 330 metres
- Width: 11 metres
- Height: 15 metres
- No. of lanes: 2

History
- Constructed by: John Holland
- Opened: 14 June 1974

The Rip Bridge is a bridge that carries Maitland Bay Drive over Brisbane Water between Booker Bay and Daleys Point on the Central Coast, New South Wales, Australia.

== History ==
In September 1971, John Holland was awarded a contract by the Department of Main Roads to build a prestressed concrete cantilever bridge over Brisbane Water between Booker Bay and Daleys Point. It was opened on 14 June 1974 by Deputy Premier of New South Wales Charles Cutler.
