= Umina Beach =

- Suburb
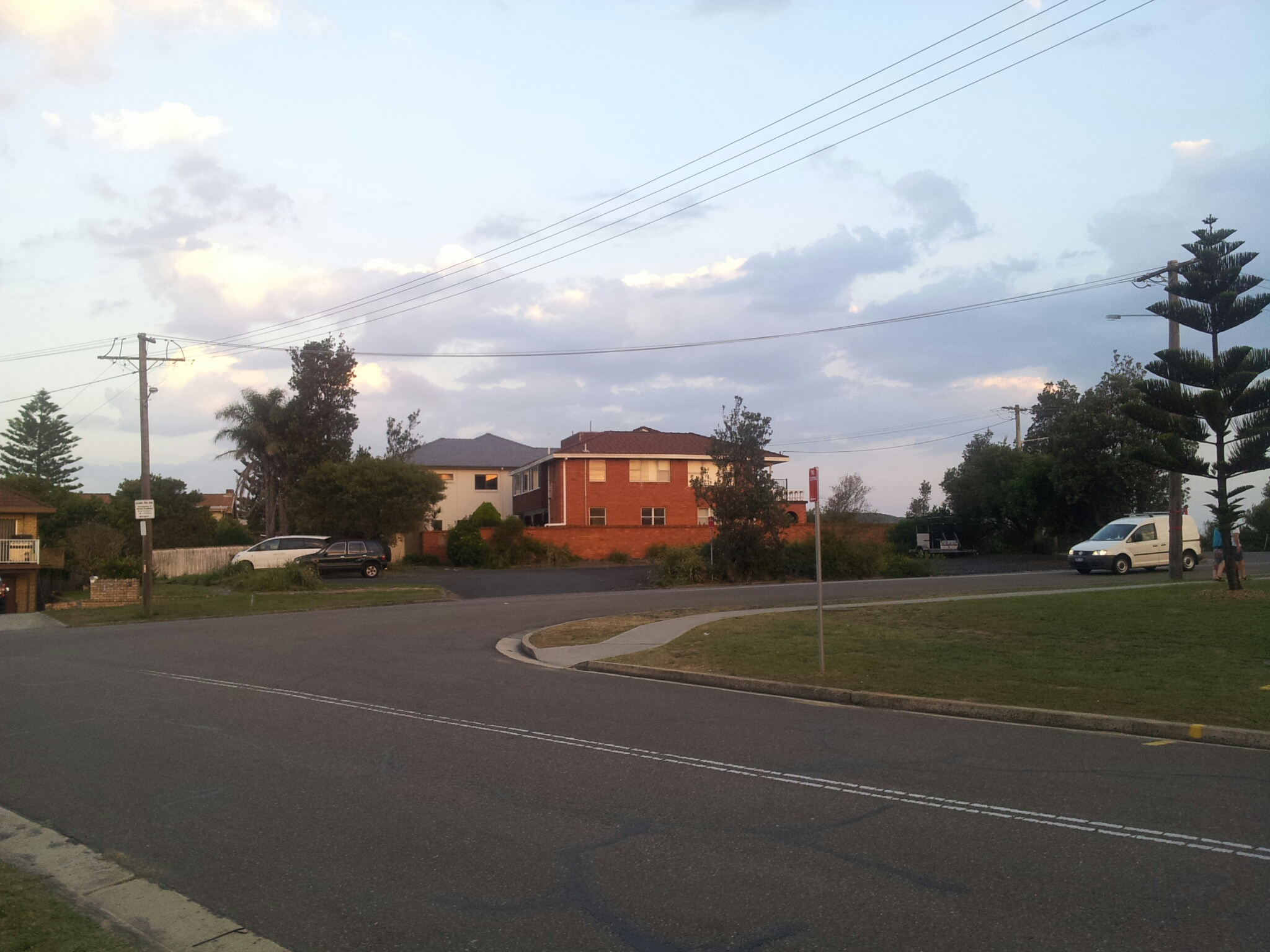
- A residential street in Umina Beach

- Interactive map of Umina Beach
- Coordinates: 33°31′5″S 151°18′36″E
- Country: Australia
- State: New South Wales
- City: Central Coast
- LGA: Central Coast Council
- Location: 16 km (9.9 mi) SSW of Gosford; 4 km (2.5 mi) SSW of Woy Woy; 87 km (54 mi) N of Sydney

Government
  - State electorate: Gosford
  - Federal division: Robertson

Area
  - Total: 7.2 km^{2} (2.8 sq mi)
- Elevation: 8 m (26 ft)

Population
  - Total: 17,372 (2021 census)
  - Density: 2,413/km^{2} (6,250/sq mi)
- Postcode: 2257
- Parish: Patonga
Suburbs around Umina Beach
Brisbane Water National Park	Woy Woy	Blackwall
Brisbane Water National Park	Umina Beach	Ettalong Beach
Pearl Beach	Broken Bay	Broken Bay

Umina Beach (/juːmaɪnə/ you-MY-nə) is a suburb within the Central Coast Council local government area on the Central Coast of New South Wales, Australia. Umina Beach is situated 85 kilometres (53 mi) north of Sydney and 111 kilometres (69 mi) south of Newcastle.

Umina Beach is locally known on the Central Coast as being on 'The Peninsula' (or 'Woy Woy Peninsula'). A natural peninsula that includes the towns of Umina Beach, Woy Woy, Blackwall, Booker Bay and Ettalong Beach. Moving from north to south, Umina Beach begins where Woy Woy and Blackwall end: at Veron Road and Gallipoli Avenue.

Umina Beach is the most populated suburb on the Central Coast.

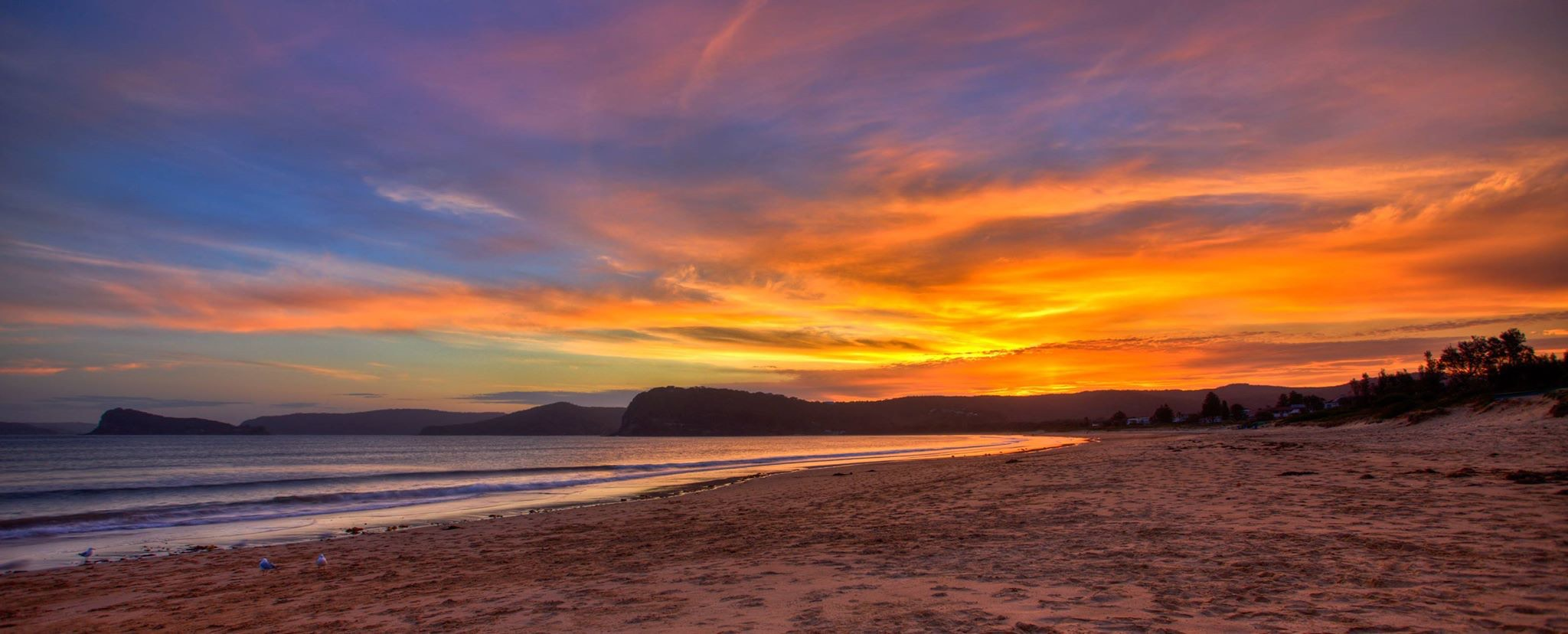
Sunset at Umina Beach

== Geography ==
Umina Beach has one unbroken sand shoreline that has been divided in name only: Umina Beach (south western section) and Ocean Beach (north eastern section). Both beaches have their own Surf Life Saving Club (refer to Sports Clubs section). The only other type of shoreline is located at Umina Point (Mt Ettalong), a Hawkesbury Sandstone headland that adjoins the south western end of Umina Beach.

Umina Beach is geographically located on the north side of Broken Bay at the river mouth of Hawkesbury River. The formation of Umina Beach and 'The Peninsula' is due to sand deposition that has been influenced by (and not limited to) climatic conditions, soil-binding flora, Hawkesbury Sandstone formations (e.g.; Box Head, Barrenjoey and Umina Point), wave patterns and tidal amplitude from the Tasman Sea, Hawkesbury River and Brisbane Water.

== History ==
The word "Umina" was derived from the Australian Aboriginal word meaning Place of sleep.

European entry to the region was first recorded in March 1788 when Governor Arthur Phillip landed with a party at Ettalong Beach. In June 1789, a more thorough investigation of Brisbane Water was conducted. A rest stop was made at Ettalong Beach before the group passed through 'The Rip' (a dangerous passage leading into Brisbane Water). On return, the party camped at Ettalong Beach before sailing to Dangar Island in the Hawkesbury River.

The first land subdivision occurred in 1914 which led to the current commercial and residential centre. Umina Beach celebrated its 100th anniversary in 2014.

== Schools ==
Umina Beach is served by two public schools, Umina Public School (primary school) and Brisbane Water Secondary College (high school).

Opened on 3 February 1956, Umina Public School's population approximates 800 students and 50 staff. It currently has 29 classes from kindergarten to year 6.

== Business ==
Umina Beach town centre has been represented by the Peninsula Chamber of Commerce since the late 1980s. It is affiliated with the NSW Business Chamber. The town centre is serviced by major retailers along with a number of local shops, takeaway restaurants and cafes. The town is also serviced by a number of medical and specialist practices, the Central Coast Council Library, and two service stations.

Noteable businesses include:

- Umina Beach Book Nook
- Kaci Apparrel
- Woolworths
- Coles
- Bremmen's Patisserie

== Transport ==
Umina Beach is well serviced by regular bus services (Busways) with connections to Woy Woy railway station and Gosford. The town centre is easily accessed with an efficient grid system of connecting roads with primary access from Ocean Beach Road, West Street and Barrenjoey Road.

== Sports fields ==
Umina Oval, located at the southern end of Melbourne Avenue, is the home ground for four pitch team sports: soccer, rugby league, cricket and tennis.

McEvoy Oval, located at the western end of McEvoy Avenue, is used for track and field athletics, touch football and cricket.

== Sports clubs ==
- Club Umina RSL Bowls Club is located in Melbourne Avenue, Umina Beach, within the Club Umina complex. Membership is available to ex and existing Servicemen of the Australian Defence Force and its allies who are financial members of both Club Umina and either Full or Associate Members of Merrylands RSL Club Sub-Branch.
- Ocean Beach Malibu Club.
- Ocean Beach Surf Life Saving Club is located at the southern end of Trafalgar Avenue, Umina Beach.
- Ocean Beach Surfers Association.
- Umina Beach "Bunnies" Rugby League Football Club is based at Umina Oval and play on the Col Gooley Field. The club is affiliated with the Central Coast Division of Country Rugby League (refer also to Country Rugby League) within the New South Wales Rugby League. The Bunnies team sheet has included Australian Kangaroos experience: Mark Geyer in 1993 and Cliff Lyons as Captain-Coach in 2001.
- Umina Boardriders.
- Umina "Bunnies" Junior Rugby League Football Club is based at Umina Oval and play on the Col Gooley Field. The club is affiliated with the Central Coast Division Junior Rugby League which is part of the Central Coast Division of Country Rugby League (refer also to Country Rugby League) within the New South Wales Rugby League.
- Umina Beach "Bunnies" Netball Club are emotionally linked to Umina Junior Rugby League Football Club and do not have a physical presence in Umina Beach. The club conducts committee meetings at Woy Woy Leagues Club, Blackwall Road, Woy Woy, has a postal address in Ettalong Beach and plays in the Woy Woy Peninsula Netball Associations competition, located in Lagoon Street, Ettalong Beach.
- Umina Beach Surf Life Saving Club is located at the southern end of Ocean Beach Road, Umina Beach.
- Umina "Devils" Cricket Club is based at Umina Oval and has 2 cricket fields. The main cricket field, Field 1, is located on the eastern side of the oval, on Col Gooley Field, and has multiple grass pitches. Field 2 is located on the western side of the oval and has one artificial cricket pitch. The club caters for both senior and junior players from 5 years of age.
- Umina United "Eagles" Soccer Club is based at Umina Oval. The club caters for both senior and junior players from 5 years of age. The club is affiliated with Central Coast Football.
- Woy Woy Peninsula Little Athletics Centre is based at McEvoy Oval. The club is affiliated with Central Coast Little Athletics. The club caters for junior athletes from 6 years of age.

Umina Beach is known as the home of "Upball"

== Community Groups ==
- Umina Community Group– The Umina Community Group is committed to improving Umina Beach by providing a unified voice to lobby the Central Coast Council and government bodies.

== Notable residents ==
- Belinda Emmett (1974–2006), actress and singer, grew up in Umina Beach
- Mark Geyer (born 1967), rugby league player and radio host
- James Harrison OAM (1936–2025), blood donor whose plasma contained unusually strong and persistent anti-D antibodies
- Daniel Patrick Russell, actor
- Dane Searls (1988–2011), BMX rider
- Lance Solomon (1913–1989), painter in oils
- Eric Worrell MBE (1924–1987), zoologist and writer
