= Box Head =

Coordinates: 33°32′56″S 151°21′04″E

- Suburb
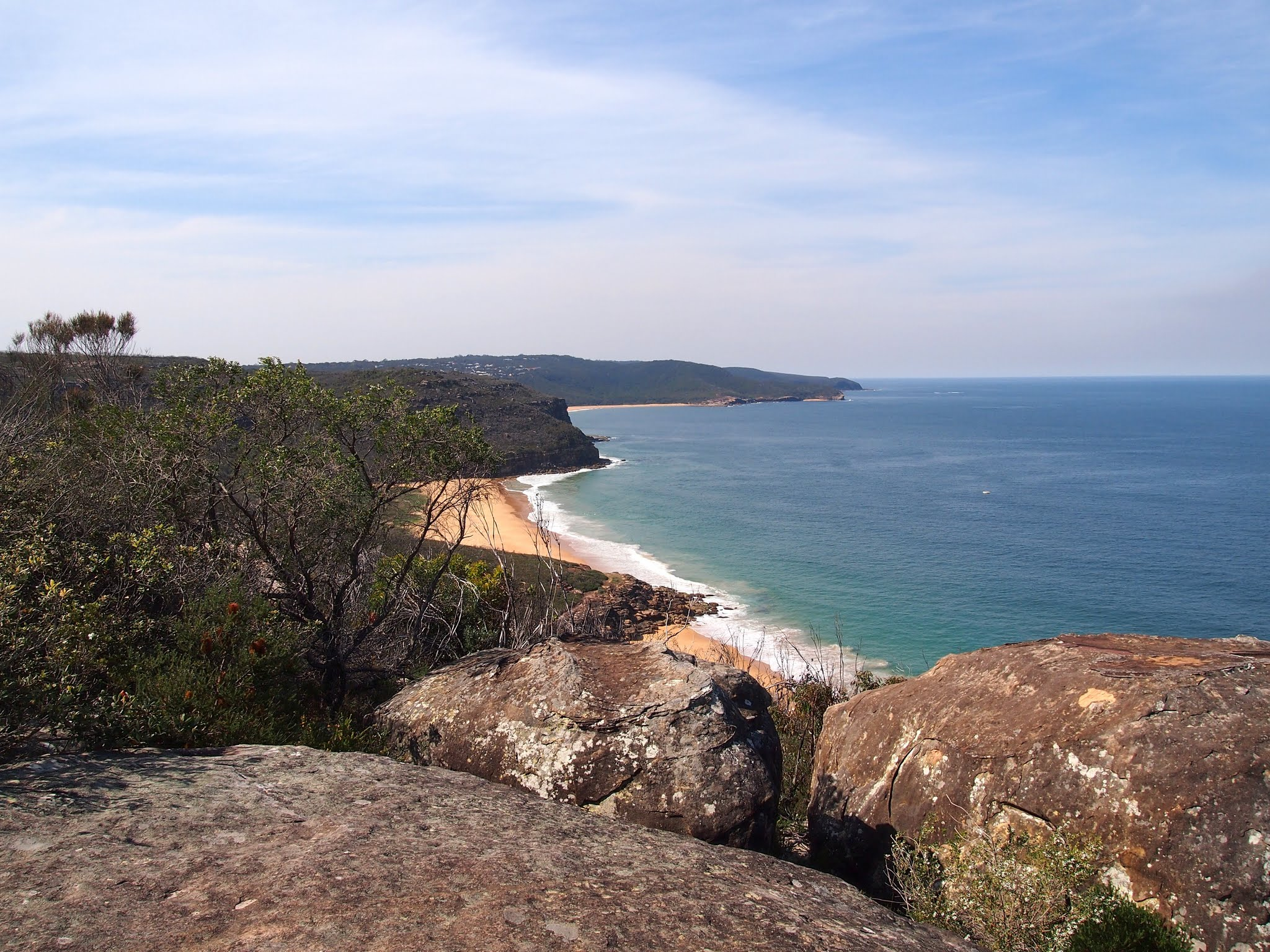
- View of Tallow Beach
- Country: Australia
- State: New South Wales
- City: Central Coast
- LGA: Central Coast Council
- Location: 23 km (14 mi) S of Gosford; 11 km (6.8 mi) SSE of Woy Woy; 95 km (59 mi) NNE of Sydney

Government
  - State electorate: Terrigal
  - Federal division: Robertson
- Elevation: 93 m (305 ft)
- Postcode: 2257
- Parish: Kincumber
Suburbs around Box Head
| Wagstaffe | Pretty Beach | Killcare |
| Broken Bay | Box Head | Tasman Sea |
| Lion Island | Tasman Sea | Tasman Sea |

Box Head is a coastal locality in the Central Coast Council local government area located on the Central Coast of New South Wales, Australia. It is within Bouddi National Park which includes the island of Lion Island.

Box has a close proximity to several beaches, including Iron Ladder Beach, Lobster Beach and Tallow Beach. The headland itself marks the northern entrance to Broken Bay from the Tasman Sea. Box Head refers to the large headland that viewed from the ocean resembles a box.

== History ==
This part of the coastland was first sighted by Europeans under James Cook, who named features of the area such as Cape Three Points and Broken Bay following his discovery of Botany Bay in Sydney.
