= Booker Bay =

- Suburb
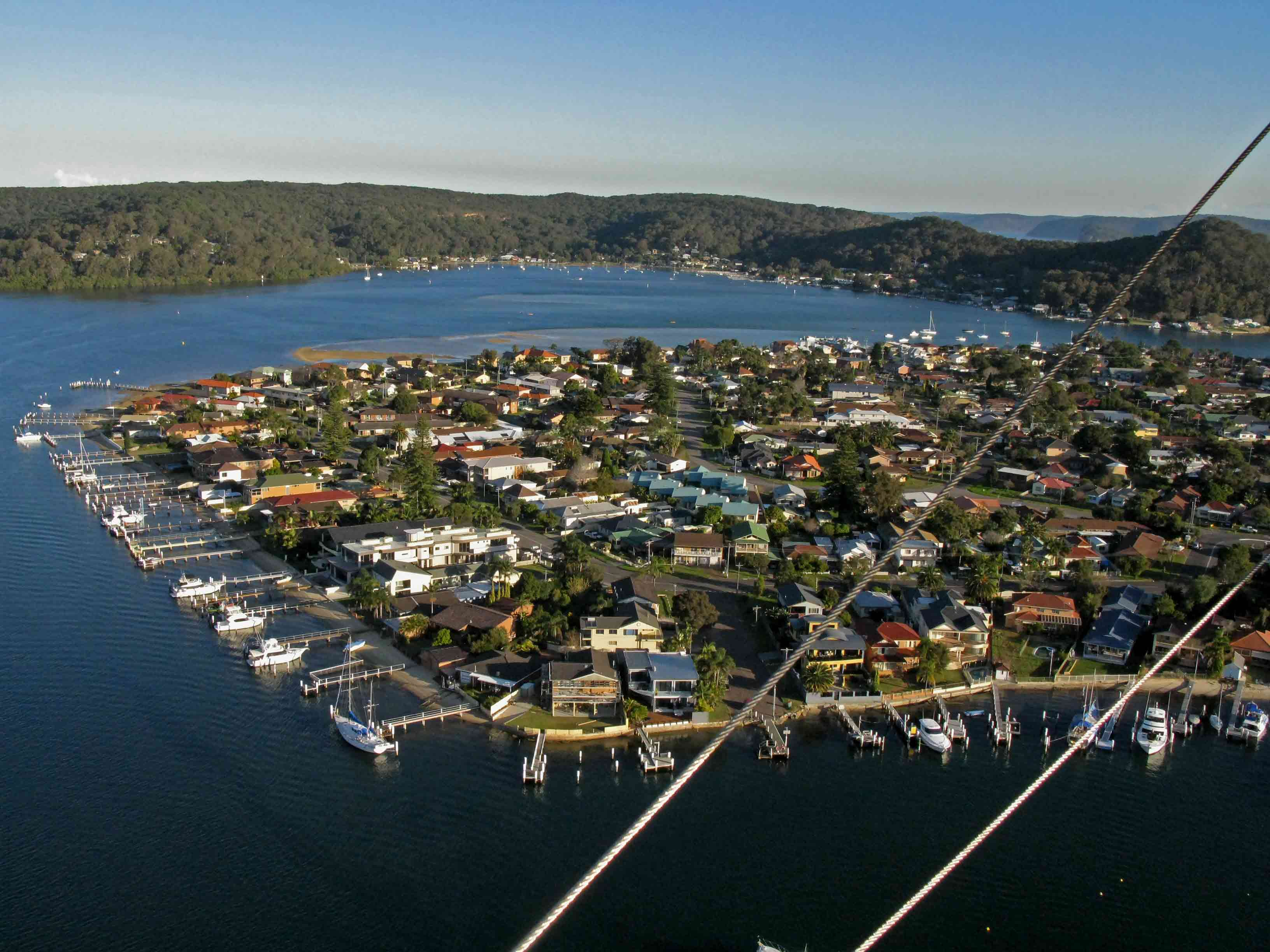
- Booker Bay aerial view

- Interactive map of Booker Bay
- Coordinates: 33°30′50″S 151°20′47″E
- Country: Australia
- State: New South Wales
- City: Central Coast
- LGA: Central Coast Council
- Location: 16 km (9.9 mi) S of Gosford; 4 km (2.5 mi) SE of Woy Woy; 82 km (51 mi) from Sydney

Government
  - State electorate: Gosford
  - Federal division: Robertson

Area
  - Total: 0.5 km^{2} (0.19 sq mi)
- Elevation: 3 m (9.8 ft)

Population
  - Total: 1,326 (2016 census)
  - Density: 2,650/km^{2} (6,900/sq mi)
- Postcode: 2257
- Parish: Patonga
Suburbs around Booker Bay
Blackwall	St Huberts Island	Daleys Point
Ettalong Beach	Booker Bay	Killcare
Wagstaffe	Pretty Beach	Hardys Bay

Booker Bay is a suburb of the Central Coast region of New South Wales Australia south-east of Woy Woy on Brisbane Water, about 80 kilometres (50 mi) north of Sydney. It is part of the Central Coast Council local government area.
