= Ettalong Beach =

- Suburb
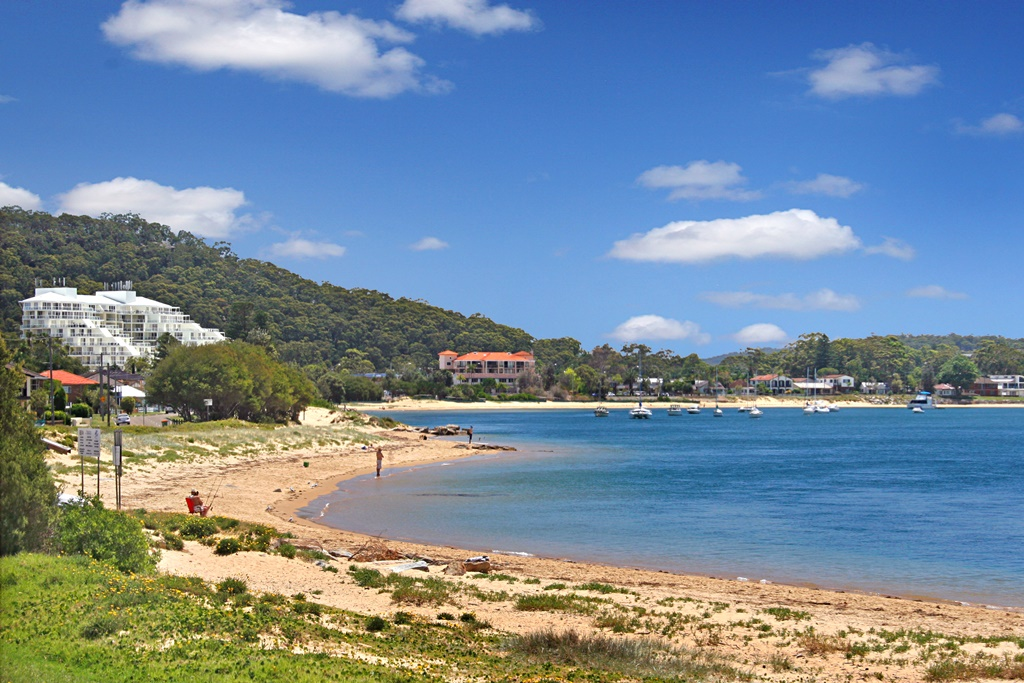
- View of Ettalong Beach

- Interactive map of Ettalong Beach
- Coordinates: 33°30′54″S 151°20′06″E
- Country: Australia
- State: New South Wales
- City: Central Coast
- LGA: Central Coast Council
- Location: 16 km (9.9 mi) S of Gosford; 4 km (2.5 mi) S of Woy Woy; 86 km (53 mi) NNE of Sydney

Government
  - State electorate: Gosford
  - Federal division: Robertson

Area
  - Total: 1.7 km^{2} (0.66 sq mi)
- Elevation: 7 m (23 ft)

Population
  - Total: 4,793 (2016 census)
  - Density: 2,820/km^{2} (7,300/sq mi)
- Postcode: 2257
- Parish: Patonga
Suburbs around Ettalong Beach
Woy Woy	Blackwall	Blackwall
Umina	Ettalong Beach	Booker Bay
Umina Beach	Broken Bay	Wagstaffe

Ettalong Beach is a suburb of the Central Coast region of New South Wales, Australia south of Woy Woy on Brisbane Water at the point where it meets Broken Bay, about 86 km north of Sydney. It is part of the Central Coast Council local government area. Ettalong Beach is the natural eastward continuation of Umina Beach and Ocean Beach. The village is serviced by a small retail centre along Ocean View Road.

The Mantra Ettalong Beach Resort (formerly operated by Outrigger) and Ettalong Beach War Memorial Club was completed in 2005.The Atlantis residential development on the corner of Memorial Avenue and The Esplanade was completed in 2018 and marks a new benchmark for mixed use development in the village centre.

Rotary Brisbane Water is based in Ettalong. One of the Central Coast's largest service clubs, members meet fortnightly at Ettalong Beach War Memorial Club.

== Demographics ==
According to the 2016 census of Population, there were 4,793 people in Ettalong Beach.

- Aboriginal and Torres Strait Islander people made up 3.3% of the population.
- 76.5% of people were born in Australia. The next most common countries of birth were England 4.8% and New Zealand 2.3%.
- 88.6% of people spoke only English at home.
- The most common responses for religion were No Religion 27.6%, Catholic 25.6% and Anglican 24.1%.

== Local features ==
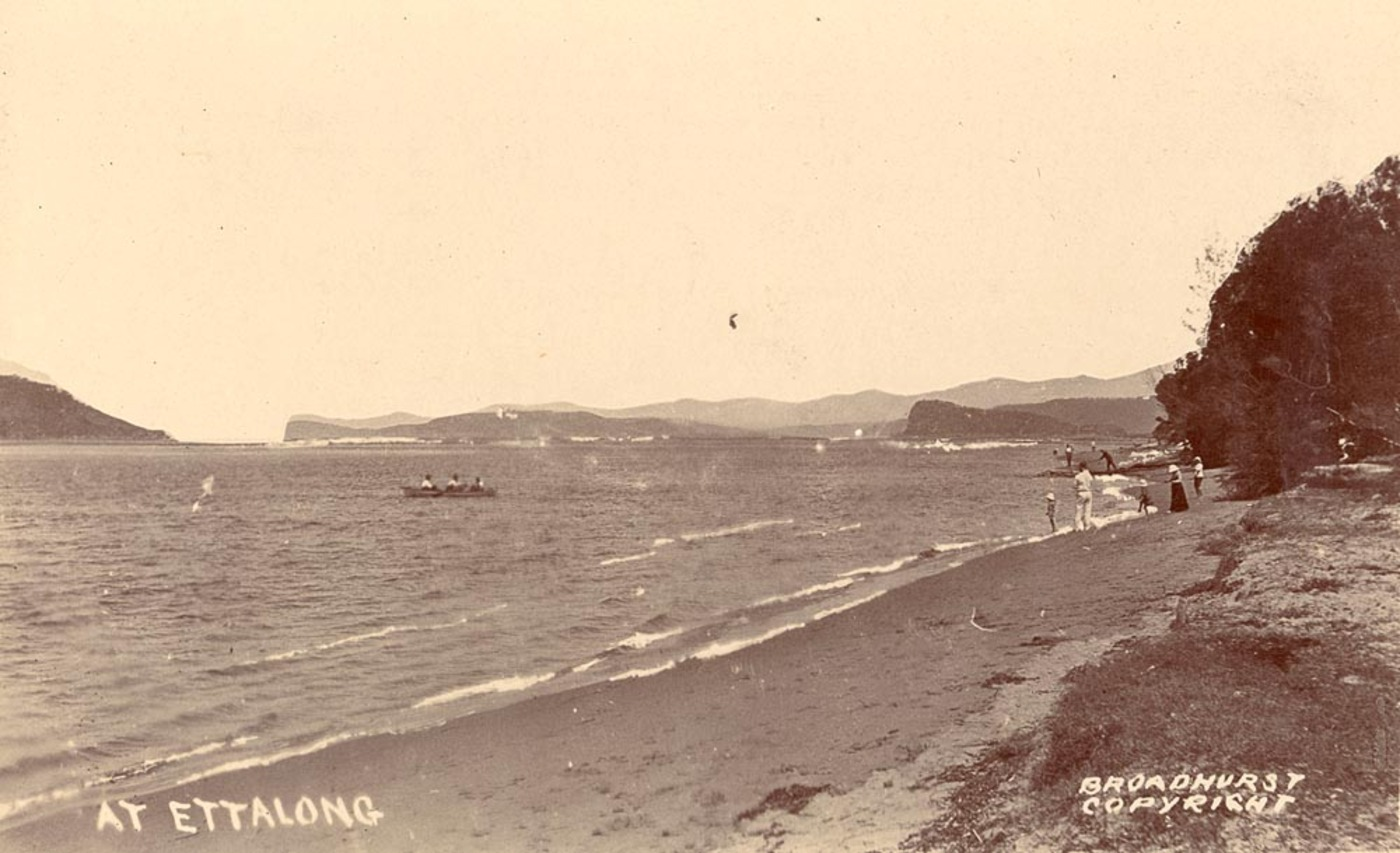
Ettalong Beach in early 1900s.

The Ettalong Beach retail centre is represented by the Peninsula Chamber of Commerce which is affiliated with the NSW Business Chamber. The Chamber successfully introduced the Peninsula Mainstreet Program in 1995 which instigated the heritage upgrade of the village centre. This led to the main street footpath paving and street landscaping which were undertaken through Gosford City Council's 1998 Financial Strategy resulting in the rejuvenation of the village. The main employers in the village are the Ettalong Beach Club, Mantra Resort, IGA Supermarket and Ettalong Beach Hotel. Ettalong Beach is also renowned for the Ettalong Beach Markets at the eastern end of Ocean View Road. The market complex also includes a range of restaurants and cafés together with the ornate Cinema Paradiso operated by a local family.

== Transport ==
Ettalong Beach is serviced by regular bus services (Busways) with connections to Woy Woy railway station, the Umina Beach retail centre, Kincumber and Erina Fair. The village is also serviced by the Palm Beach Ferry (operated by NRMA Marine) which connects the town to the north shore of Sydney and provides an important tourist route for visitors to the village and commuter link to the Northern Beaches. A "Fast Ferry" was previously proposed from Ettalong to Circular Quay, Sydney, but the company behind this idea became bankrupt in 2008, and the proposal was consequently abandoned. The ferry service was approved by Gosford City Council and remains with an active development consent so that a future operator could commence ferry services to Sydney.

== Brisbane Water Oyster Festival ==
The Brisbane Water Oyster Festival is held annually in November, on The Esplanade and the foreshore reserve. The event attracts 20,000 people annually and is organised by the Peninsula Chamber of Commerce. The event showcases the local oyster industry which is one of the earliest marine industries in Brisbane Water. The first festival was originally held at Woy Woy in 2000 but quickly outgrew its venue and was relocated to Ettalong Beach in 2005. The highly successful community festival is run by a sub-committee of the Peninsula Chamber of Commerce and chaired from its inception by the Peninsula Mainstreet Co-ordinator Debra Wales.

== Foreshore upgrade ==
The Ettalong Beach Foreshore Reserve upgrade was completed in early 2014 by Gosford City Council (now Central Coast Council) at a total cost of almost $5.4M including Federal funds of $2M. The works were a culmination of 15 years of lobbying by the Peninsula Chamber of Commerce for the upgrading of the foreshore and renourishment of Ettalong Beach. The upgraded foreshore includes children's play areas, barbecue facilities, cycle ways, landscaping and café/restaurant overlooking the beach area. The cycle way links Ettalong Beach with Umina Beach to the south.
