= Brisbane Water =

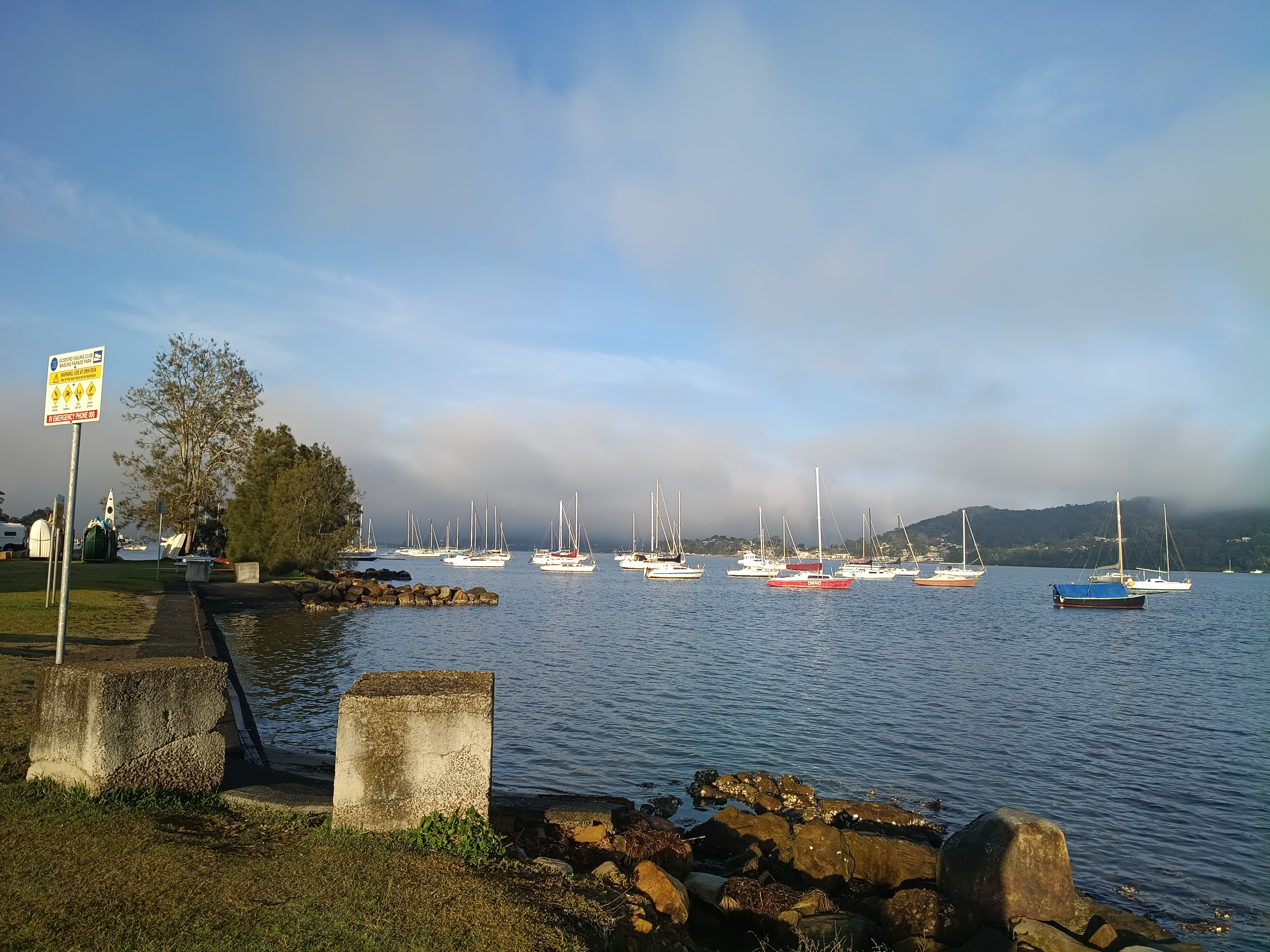
- Etymology: Sir Thomas Brisbane

Location
- Country: Australia
- State: New South Wales
- Region: Central Coast
- Municipality: Central Coast Council

Physical characteristics
- Source: Narara Creek
  - location: Gosford
  - coordinates: 33°26′00″S 151°19′39″E
- 2nd source: Coorumbine Creek
  - location: East Gosford
- Mouth: Broken Bay
  - location: Wagstaffe Point – Ettalong Beach
  - coordinates: 33°31′25″S 151°20′5″E
- Length: 17.72 km (11.01 mi)
- Basin size: 165 km^{2} (64 sq mi)

Basin features
- Tributaries
  - left: Erina Creek, Kincumber Creek
  - right: Woy Woy Creek, Ettalong Creek

Brisbane Water is a wave-dominated barrier estuary located in the Central Coast region of New South Wales, Australia. Brisbane Water has its origin at the confluence of the Narara and Coorumbine Creeks, to the south–east of Gosford and travels for approximately 18 kilometres (11 mi) in a southerly direction to its mouth at Broken Bay, about 7 kilometres (4.3 mi) from the Tasman Sea, at Barrenjoey Head. A number of towns and suburbs surround the shores of Brisbane Water, including Blackwall, Booker Bay, Davistown, Empire Bay, Erina, Ettalong Beach, Gosford, Green Point, Hardys Bay, Kilcare, Kincumber, Koolewong, Phegans Bay, Point Frederick, Point Clare, Saratoga, Tascott, Wagstaffe, and Woy Woy. Contained within Brisbane Water is St Huberts Island, Rileys Island, Dunmar Island and Pelican Island; and adjoining the estuary is Brisbane Water National Park to the west and Bouddi National Park to the east. Forming part of the same tidal estuary system is a separate but connected basin, the Kincumber Broadwater, lying to the east of Davistown.

The total catchment area of the river is approximately 165 square kilometres (64 sq mi).

The land adjacent to the Brisbane Water was occupied for many thousands of years by Australian Aboriginal peoples, the Darkinjung and Kuringgai, who used the estuary and foreshore areas for cultural purposes.

Brisbane Water was named in 1825 in honour of Sir Thomas Brisbane, a Governor of New South Wales, serving between 1820 and 1825.

== History ==
Brisbane Water is part of the traditional lands of the Kuringgai-Awabakal Aboriginal peoples. Places of significance to Aboriginal people located in the area surrounding Brisbane Water that are listed on the Register of the National Estate include Daleys Point area and Staples Lookout, west of Woy Woy.

The first documented contact between the two cultures appears to have occurred in June 1789, when Governor Arthur Phillip and Captain John Hunter led a party of 10 men to explore Broken Bay. They conversed with around twenty Aboriginal people whom they met within the shoaly harbour later known as Brisbane Water.

Initial colonial explorers of the area were assisted by Bungaree, a leader of the Kuringgai tribe who went on to assist Phillip Parker King and Matthew Flinders in the circumnavigation of Australia.

Twentieth century European settlement led to the development of an extensive local ferry network, including one supplying an otherwise isolated orphanage, a commuter service from Gosford to Woy Woy and a third operation dedicated to carrying farm produce. The last commuter ferries between Brisbane Water townships ceased in 1971. The only ferry service to exist now services the communities of Empire Bay, Davistown, Saratoga and Woy Woy and is operated by Central Coast Ferries.

In 1973, local residents on Rileys Island requested a green ban after a development company intended to remove all native vegetation to make way for construction on the island.

== Environment ==
The Brisbane Water estuary and foreshores have particularly high scenic value and include areas of pristine vegetation and extensive views of the water from a number of locations. Beaches, inlets and bays can be distinguished in the foreground with inherent juxtaposition of bushland-covered hills in the distance. Access to existing key vantage points allows for the public to experience the landscape character of the Brisbane Water estuary and its surrounds.

With the approximate average bed level at 5 metres (16 ft) and often as low as 3 metres (9.8 ft), Brisbane Water is considered mostly shallow, with a tidal impact of ±0.4 metres (1 ft 4 in). The inlet narrows at a point known as The Rip, located adjacent to Ettalong Beach. The Rip has a rapid tidal current.

The oyster industry is an important part of the local economy. In terms of Sydney rock oyster production, in 2007–2008 a total of ~250,000 dozens of oysters were produced in the Brisbane Water estuary, with a total value of A$1.3 million representing approximately 3.6% of the NSW industry total for 2007–2008.

During 2009, over 110 bird species were recorded within the estuary; with sixty vulnerable and fourteen endangered animal species, and sixteen vulnerable and eight endangered plant species. Some 2,277 hectares (5,630 acres) of Brisbane Water is classified by BirdLife International as an important bird area because it has an isolated population of up to ten breeding pairs of bush stone-curlews and sometimes supports flocks of the endangered regent honeyeater and swift parrot during autumn and winter, when the swamp mahogany trees are in flower.

== Gallery ==
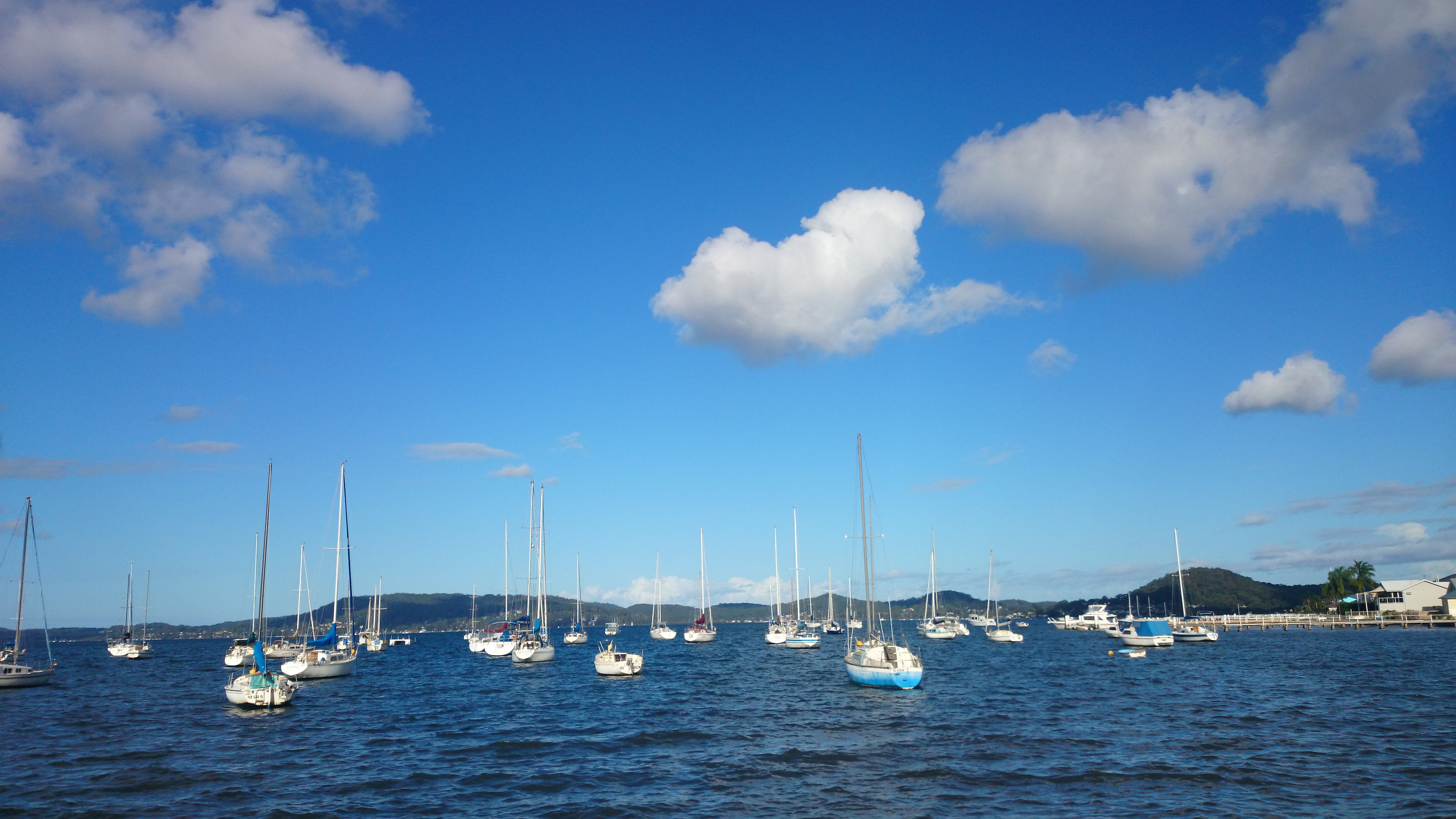
Sailing boats scattered across a section of Brisbane Water

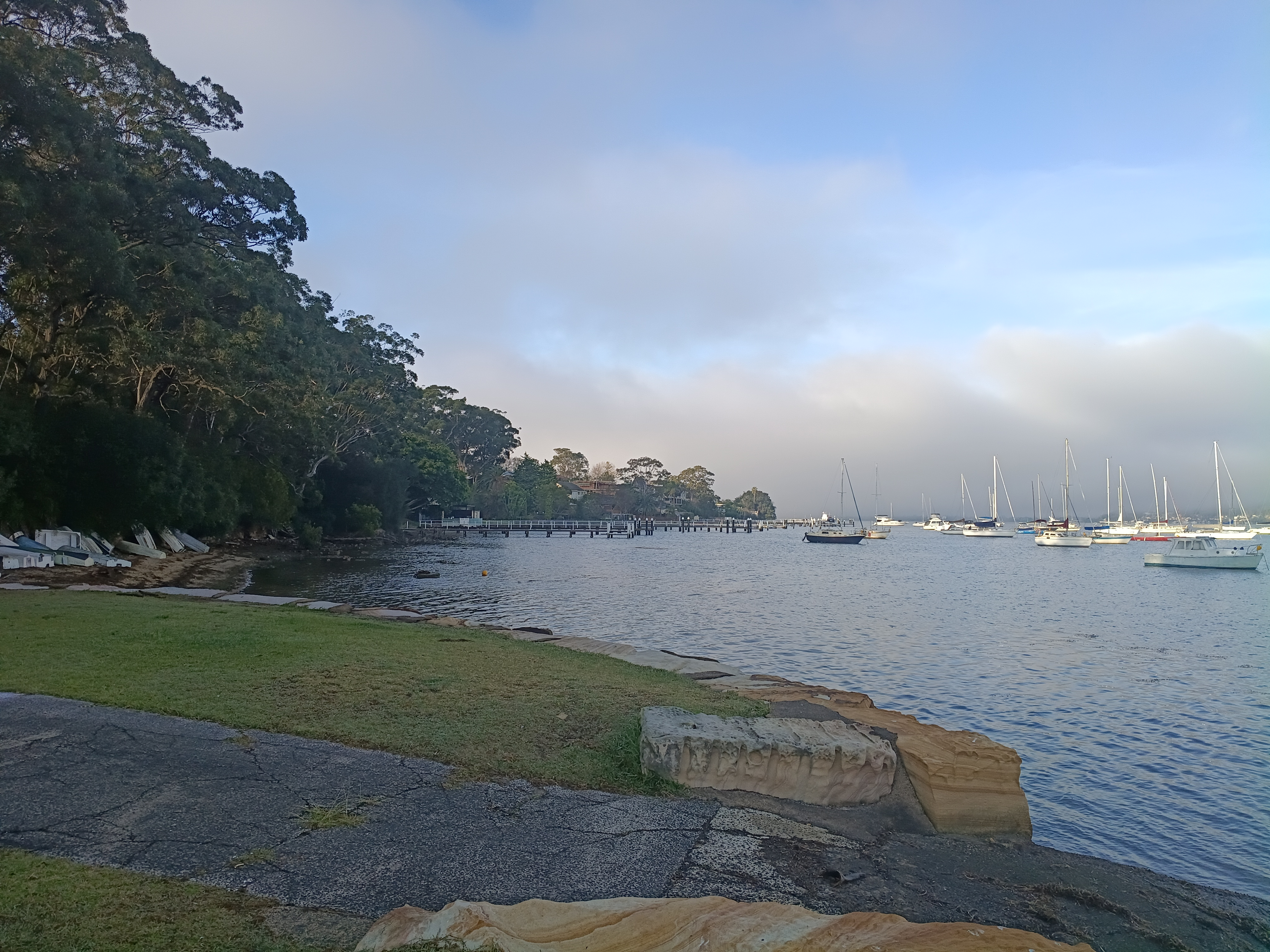
Brisbane Water viewed from 1st Gosford Scout Hall, with small boats along the shore and yachts across the estuary

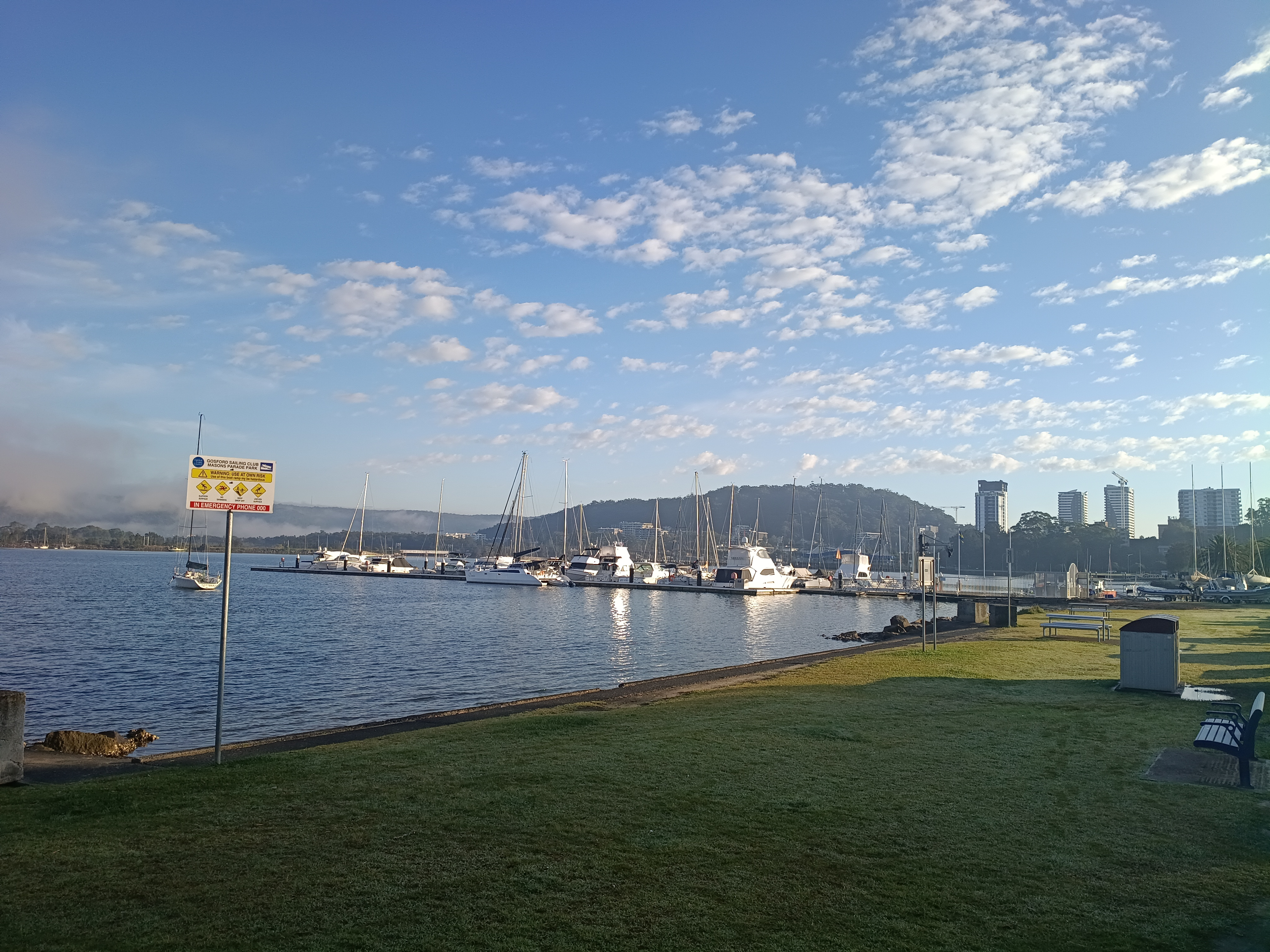
View of Brisbane Water and Gosford Sailing Club marina

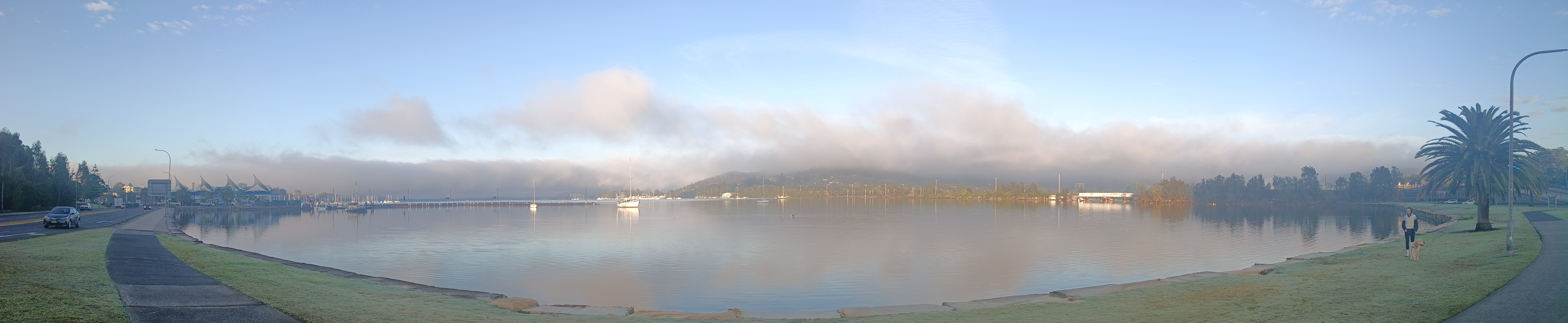
Panoramic view of Brisbane Water from Gosford
