= Hardys Bay =

Coordinates: 33°31′23″S 151°21′22″E

- Suburb
- Interactive map of Hardys Bay
- Country: Australia
- State: New South Wales
- City: Central Coast
- LGA: Central Coast Council
- Location: 22 km (14 mi) S of Gosford; 10 km (6.2 mi) SSE of Woy Woy; 94 km (58 mi) N of Sydney

Government
  - State electorate: Terrigal
  - Federal division: Robertson

Area
  - Total: 0.9 km^{2} (0.35 sq mi)
- Elevation: 2 m (6.6 ft)

Population
  - Total: 227 (2016 census)
  - Density: 252/km^{2} (650/sq mi)
- Postcode: 2257
- Parish: Kincumber
Suburbs around Hardys Bay
		Killcare
Pretty Beach	Hardys Bay	Killcare
	Box Head

Hardys Bay is a south-eastern suburb of the Central Coast region of New South Wales, Australia on the Bouddi Peninsula. It is part of the Central Coast Council local government area.

== History ==
Hardys Bay was named after Harry Hardy, who kept a small vineyard and sold wine to local residents. It is home to local shops and cafés, an RSL Club and a marina. The history of Hardys Bay and the surrounding areas of Wagstaffe, Killcare and Pretty Beach are closely linked. Prior to the arrival of European Settlement, Indigenous Australians from the coastal Guringai (Ku-ring-gai) tribe lived in and around Hardys Bay area. Evidence is to be found today in rock carvings and middens found in numerous locations around the area.

On 6 June 1789 Governor Arthur Phillip sailed north and entered Broken Bay and explored the surrounding coastline. The first recorded white settler was a Mr James Mullen (or Mullin) who was granted temporary occupation of 250 acres (1.0 km^{2}) in 1824 for grazing and by the 1829 Census is recorded as having "50 acres (200,000 m^{2}) of land, 10 acres (40,000 m^{2}) cleared, 10 cultivated and having 3 horses and 115 cattle.

In 1859, Captain Daniel Joyce from New Zealand purchased a 50-acre (200,000 m^{2}) grant from Mallen. (This is the land on which the Hardys Bay R.S.L. is currently located.) Joyce subsequently defaulted on his debt which forced the mortgagees to sell his land in Brisbane Waters which was purchased by Mr Robert Hardy, Farmer.

Access to Hardys Bay and the surrounding peninsula was via ferry until 1936 when the Scenic Road was opened. Electricity arrived in 1939 and town water was connected in 1980.

== Development ==
Large scale rutile mining took place over the hill at Putty and Killcare beaches in the 1960s and stripped the beach of its large sand dunes and destroyed many native plants, molluscs and animals. Miners had agreed to revegetate the area which they did with the noxious pest bitou bush (Chrysanthemoides monilifera), which the various land care groups are now trying to eradicate.

Over the last 30 years property values in the area have reached into the millions of dollars as it is a prime location for holiday houses and retirement, like many other coastal areas within close proximity of a major city.

Some heritage sites, including the Ferry Masters cottage at Wagstaffe have been illegally demolished and developed despite council attempts to prevents this; prosecution of the developers was unsuccessful due to a technicality.

=== Marina development ===
In late 2007 a scheme to develop the existing marina was presented to the community by the Marina's CEO, Michael Sparks. This $13 million development would see the existing marina as well as the historic Hardys Bay wharf replaced by a much larger structure containing: 100 car parks over the water; an increase in the number of berths from 23 to 100; additional retail, cafe and restaurant space; as well as providing a 7-day a week boat maintenance facility. Additionally, any applications for new or upgraded marinas must include the provision of a 24-hour sewerage pump-out facility.

Sparks also advised that this marina project application would circumvent the local council approval process and use what is called the Part 3A method of approval. This is a reference to the new provision in the Environmental Planning and Assessment Act which reduces the involvement of the community in the original decision-making process. The decision makers for applications made by marinas under this law are the Minister for Planning and Director General, Department of Planning. While the developers maintain that there will be little environmental impact, a stand of grey mangroves (Avicennia marina) will have to be removed to make way for the structure, and degradation of the beds of sea grasses is also possible.

Following a presentation to the Hardys Bay Resident Group on 19 February 2008 by Sparks, the group rejected the redevelopment plan. In March 2008, the Wagstaffe to Killcare Community Association also announced that they could not support the current proposal. In early 2008 the plan was rejected by the Department of Planning after numerous complaints from as far away as Slovenia.

== Notable residents ==
- Felicity Ward, comedian lived in Hardys Bay until she was eleven years old.
