= Dane Searls =

Australian BMX driver

- Born: 22 February 1988; Umina, Australia
- Died: 25 November 2011 (aged 23); Southport, Queensland, Australia
- Cause of death: Fall
- Occupation: BMX Rider

Dane Searls (22 February 1988 – 25 November 2011) was an Australian BMX rider. He created Giants of Dirt. He died on 25 November 2011 after an unsuccessful attempt to jump into a swimming pool from a balcony in Queensland, Australia, landing on his head and back, at a party for him jumping the 60 feet (18 m) dirt ramp. He suffered traumatic head and back injuries, Searls died at Gold Coast Hospital in Southport, Queensland, Australia.
