= Lion Island (New South Wales) =

Protected area in New South Wales, Australia

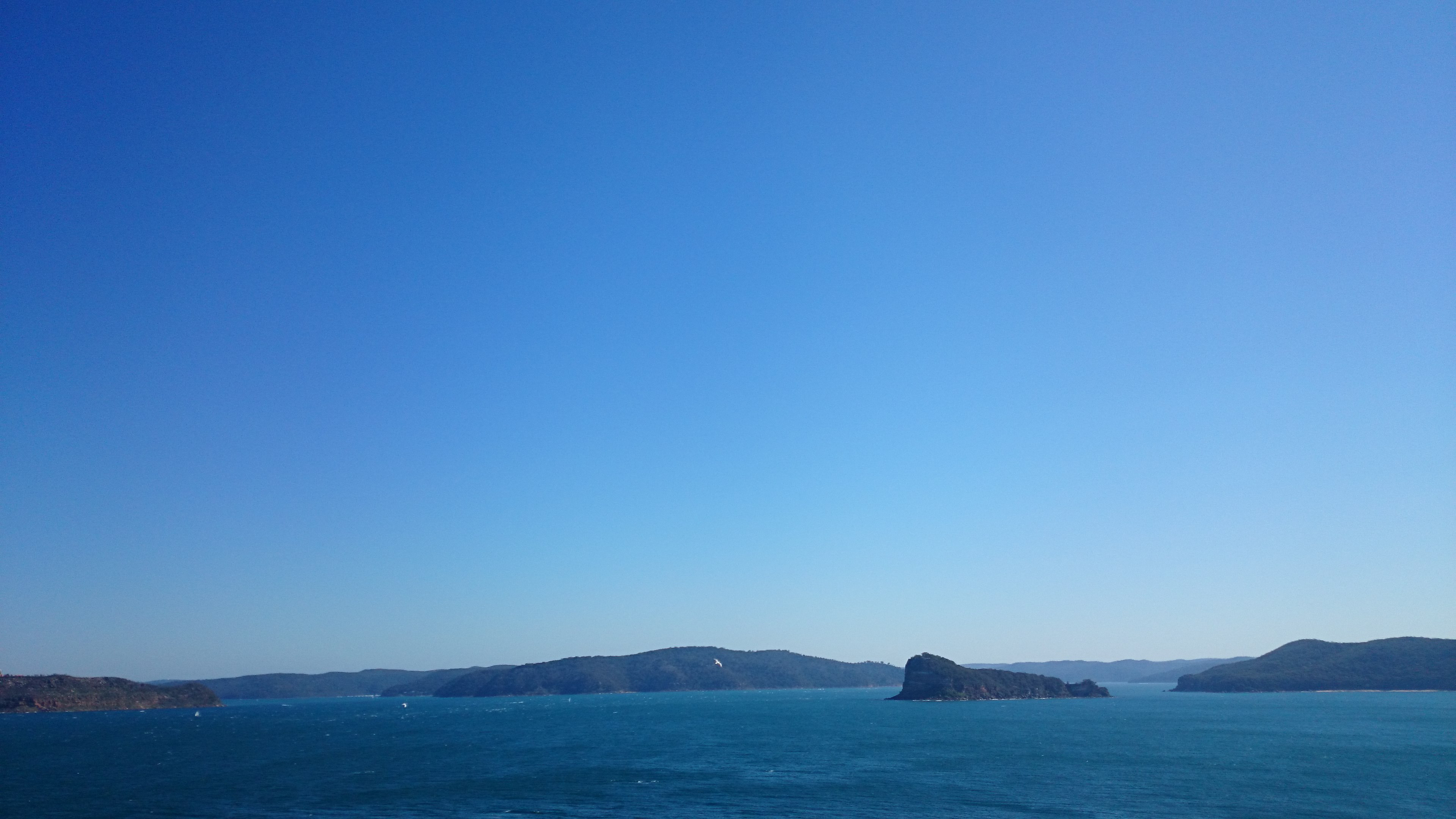
- View of Lion Island from Iron Ladder Beach
- Interactive map of Lion Island

Geography
- Location: Broken Bay

Administration
- Australia
- State: New South Wales

Lion Island Nature Reserve
- IUCN category Ia (strict nature reserve)
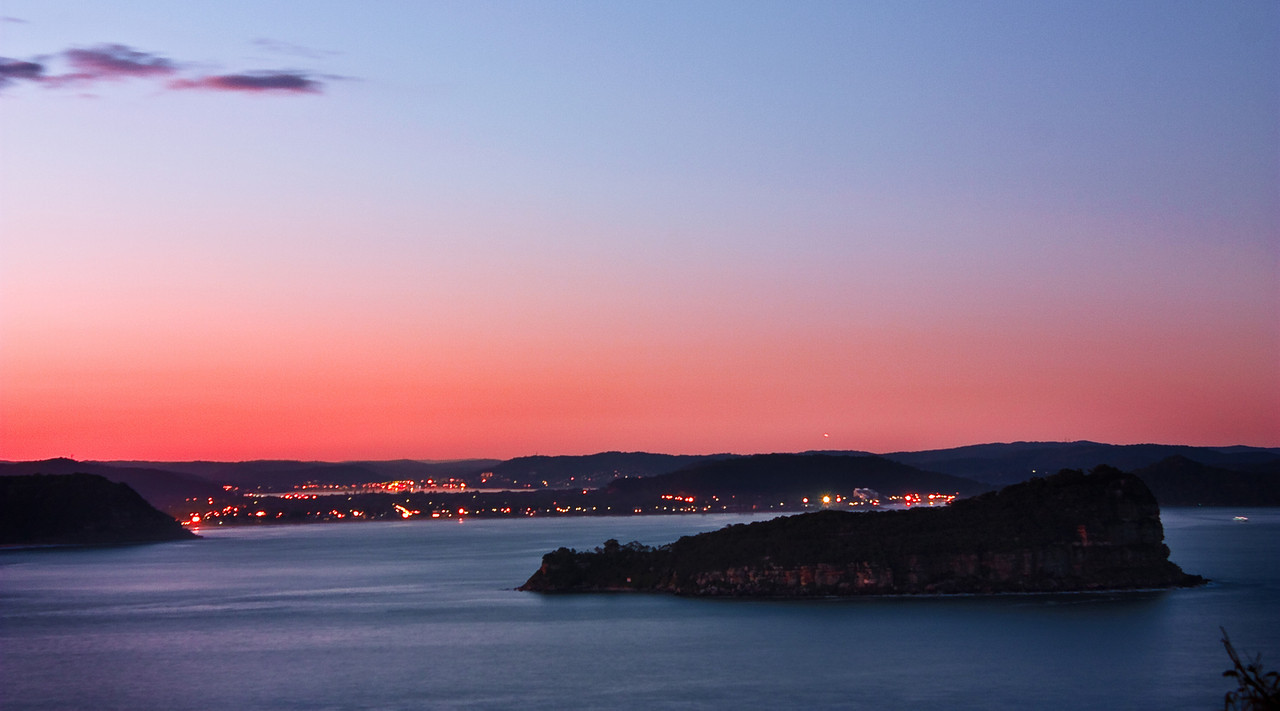
- Sunset view of Lion Island

- Location within New South Wales
- Location: New South Wales
- Nearest city: Gosford
- Coordinates: 33°33′25″S 151°19′04″E
- Area: 0.08 km^{2} (0.031 sq mi)
- Established: 1956
- Governing body: NSW National Parks & Wildlife Service

Lion Island is an island that is located at the mouth of the Hawkesbury River in Broken Bay on the Central Coast of the state of New South Wales, Australia. The island is located just off Pearl Beach and is part of the Central Coast Council local government area.

The island is so named because it resembles a Sphinx, a mythical figure of a crouching lion. Lion Island is part of the Brisbane Water National Park, as it is one of the two islands located within the national park, along with Spectacle Island in the Hawkesbury River.

== Etymology ==
The island was originally named Mount Elliott Island by Governor Arthur Phillip in 1789, because it resembled Gibraltar, where his friend, General Elliott, had inflicted defeats on French and Spanish fleets. This name continued to be used by cartographers until the 1920s.

== Nature reserve status ==
In 1956, the Lion Island Fauna Reserve was established on the island. In 1977, it was reclassified as the Lion Island Nature Reserve, a protected nature reserve under the National Parks and Wildlife Act 1967 and is administered by the NSW National Parks & Wildlife Service. The nature reserve covers all of the island, an area of approximately 8 hectares (20 acres).

Due to the island's significant biodiversity it was added to the Australian National Heritage List in December 2006. The island is a breeding habitat for shearwaters, and is free of feral cats and foxes. The island has a weed infestation problem that includes Bitou Bush and Lantana.

=== Australian little penguin colony ===
Lion Island contains the largest population of Australian little penguins in the Central Coast. In 2007, the population was approximately 300 breeding pairs and appeared to be stable.

A more recent study has suggested that the colony has been in steep decline since the 1990s. No primary cause of the decline has been identified. By comparison, the colony at Manly in Sydney is believed to be stable.

Lion Island supports mammalian predators, namely water rats, which have been observed running along the water's edge at night. Rat nest depredation has been proven to impact the little penguin population on Granite Island in South Australia.

In 2012, penguin researchers observed that penguins' feeding trips were much longer than those taken by the population on Bowen Island in the Jervis Bay Territory.

In 2021, efforts were made to clear storm debris that had washed up ahead of penguin breeding season.

=== Access restrictions ===
Public access to the island is by permit, provided by the National Parks and Wildlife Service Regional Manager, and is restricted to conservation, education and research purposes. No recreational facilities are provided on the island.

=== August 2018 fire ===
On the evening of 25 August 2018 it was reported that Lion Island was fully engulfed in flames following a lightning strike.

== Geography ==
The cap at the Eastern end of Lion Island is composed of Hawkesbury Sandstone. The shores of the island are composed of the older Narrabeen Group of sandstones and shales.

== Media ==
In 2005, a documentary film claimed erroneously that the wreckage of a Japanese midget submarine, which disappeared after the attack on Sydney Harbour in 1942, was buried under sand on the seabed, just east of Lion Island. The wreck has since been located near Bungan Head.

== See also ==
- Islands of New South Wales
- Protected areas of New South Wales
