= Felicity Ward =

Australian comedian

- Ward at the 2026 Edinburgh Festival Fringe
- Born: 1980 (age 45–46); Killcare, New South Wales, Australia
- Notable work: Spicks and Specks, Thank God You're Here, Good News Week, The Ronnie Johns Half Hour, Any Questions For Ben?
- Children: 1

Felicity Ward (born 1980) is an Australian comedian and actress, best known for her TV appearances on Spicks and Specks, Thank God You're Here and Good News Week, and as a writer/performer in the Channel 10 Network television programme The Ronnie Johns Half Hour. She is a part of The 3rd Degree, who made and starred in The Ronnie Johns Half Hour.

== Early life ==
Ward grew up in Killcare, a small coastal town on the Central Coast of New South Wales.

== Career ==
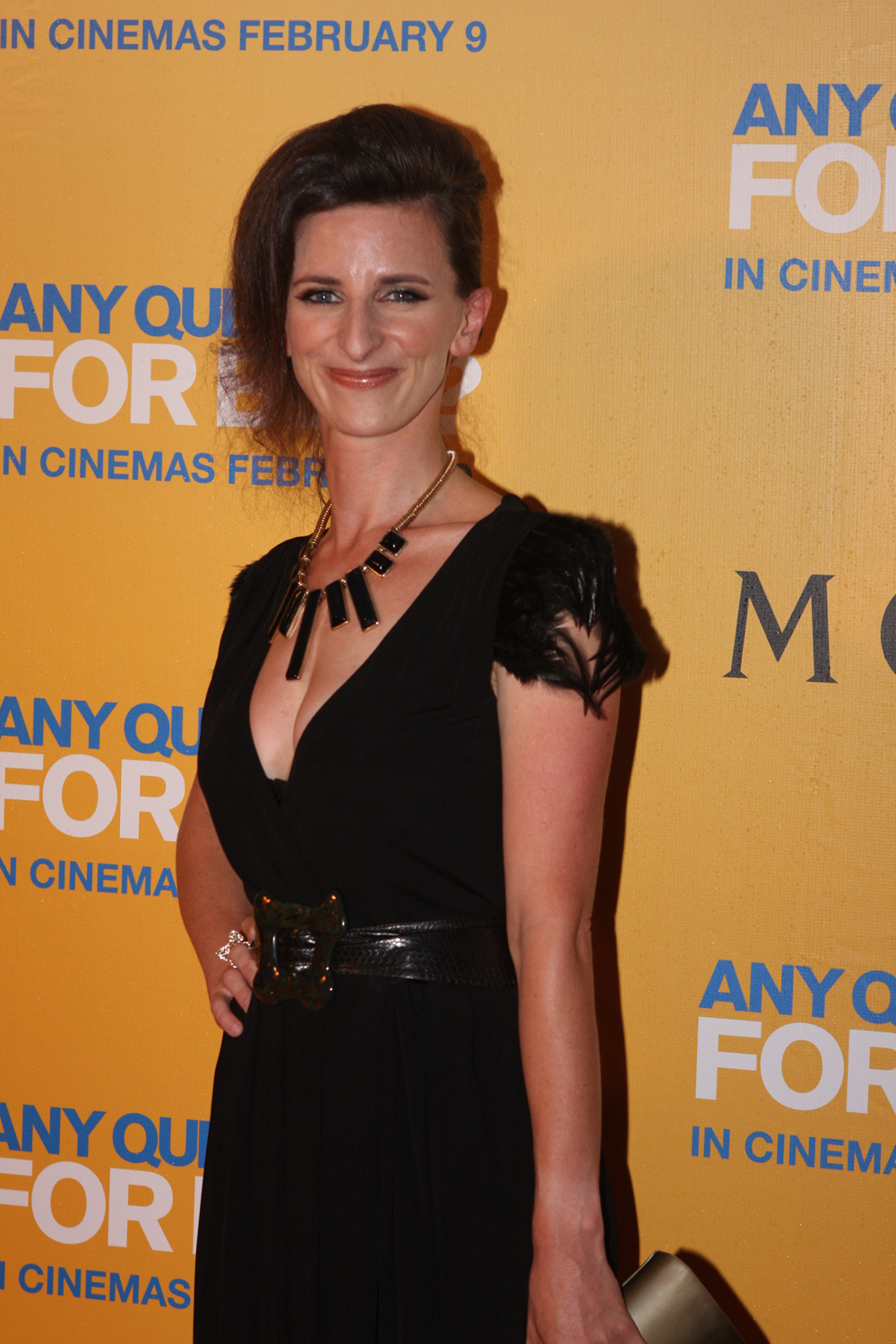
Ward at the Any Questions for Ben? Premiere In Sydney, January 2012

=== Early TV and stage work ===
Ward first came to public attention in the Logie-nominated sketch show The Ronnie Johns Half Hour, especially her character work as six-year-old Poppy, German nihilist Gretchen and lawn bowls instructor Heidi.

She made several appearances on the ABC's Spicks and Specks during its six-year run until 2011. She also hosted The Comedy Hour on 774 ABC Melbourne.

From 2006 to 2009, Ward performed alongside fellow 3rd Degree member Heath Franklin (as Chopper) in the highly popular comedy festival show "Chopper's Fuckin Bingo". Ward played Chopper's ball girl and drug addict niece, Jenny. It has been performed in Melbourne, Adelaide and Sydney, including Chopper's Fuckin Christmas Bingo in 2007.

=== Solo stand-up success ===
At the 2008 Melbourne Fringe Festival, Ward performed her debut full-length solo stand-up show, "Felicity Ward's Ugly as A Child Variety Show" to popular and critical acclaim, culminating in her winning the Melbourne Airport Award for Best Newcomer.

In 2009, Ward brought her award-winning "Ugly As A Child Variety Show" to the Adelaide Fringe (20 February–21 March), the Melbourne International Comedy Festival (1–26 April), the Sydney Comedy Festival (12–17 May) and the Edinburgh Festival Fringe (7-31 August). Produced by Laughing Stock Productions, the show was a commercial and critical hit, selling out shows in all cities. Ward was nominated for Best Newcomer at the 2009 MICF and won Mervyn Stutter's Spirit of the Fringe Award at the Edinburgh Festival Fringe.

In September 2009, Ward appeared at the Melbourne Fringe Festival with a new show - "Felicity Ward reads from The Book of Moron", a hybrid storytelling/stand-up show with music. She performed the show at the 2010 Adelaide Fringe, Brisbane Comedy Festival and Melbourne International Comedy Festival.

On 22 March 2010, Ward appeared on the Melbourne International Comedy Festival Gala on Network 10.

In 2011, Ward appeared in front of sell-out crowds with her critically acclaimed show "Honestly", culminating in winning Best Local Act at the Time out Sydney Comedy Festival Awards 2011. She was also named in the Sydney Morning Herald's Top 10 comedy shows for 2011, was the face of the Melbourne International Comedy Festival and garnered four star reviews all over the country. She toured internationally: to Hong Kong and Singapore, with the Melbourne International Comedy Festival Roadshow, and to New Zealand, with the Comedy Convoy. She also performed a variety style show at the Melbourne Fringe Festival in September 2011 called Felicity Ward's (week-long, ill-timed) Christmas Special.

Her new show, "The Hedgehog Dilemma", was performed at the 2012 Adelaide Fringe Festival and the Melbourne International Comedy Festival with sell-out seasons and nominated Best Comedy at both festivals. It was then performed the Sydney Comedy Festival and Perth Comedy Festival where she won Best Australian Act at both festivals. It has now been invited to the Edinburgh Fringe Festival in 2012, and a short run at the Soho Theatre in London following that.

Ward performed multiple times at the Latitude Festival. Her 2018 show "Busting a Nut" was nominated for Best Show at the Edinburgh Comedy Awards.

After an eight-year absence, Ward returned to the Edinburgh Festival Fringe in 2026 with the show "I Wish I Could Come Out of My Shell", which dealt with her ADHD diagnosis, divorce, single parenting and newly-realised bisexuality.

=== Supporting roles ===
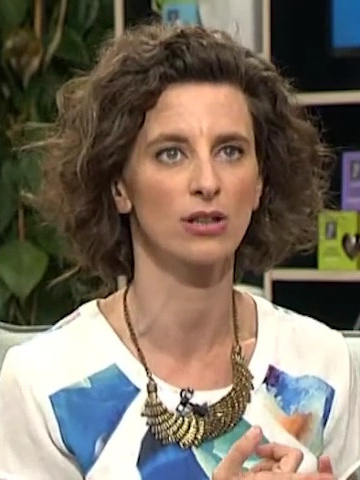
Ward in 2016

Ward had a well received supporting role in the 2012 Australian comedy Any Questions for Ben?, created by Working Dog Productions.

In 2014, Ward appeared as Lizzie in The Inbetweeners 2 and in 2015 she appeared as a stand-up guest on The John Bishop Show.

Ward has featured as a guest host on a number of episodes of the satirical comedy podcast The Bugle. She has also appeared on UK television as a guest including Roast Battle on Comedy Central in 2019 and Richard Osman's House of Games on the BBC in 2023.

== Filmography ==
Year	Title	Role	Notes
2024	The Office	Hannah Howard	8 episodes; main role
2023	Richard Osman's House of Games	Herself	5 episodes
2022	The Mind of Herbert Clunkerdunk	Denim Jean	1 episode
2021	Late Night Mash	Office Worker	1 episode
2021	Wakefield	Collette	8 episodes
2019	Roast Battle	Herself	1 episode
2019	The Mash Report	Various	1 episode
2019	Gameface	Charlotte	2 episodes
2019	The Letdown	Ros	1 episode
2017	Ronny Chieng: International Student	Post Grad Student	1 episode
2016	Comedy Showroom: Ronny Chieng - International Student	Post Grad Student	
2015	Josh	Briony	1 episode
2014	The Inbetweeners 2	Lizzie	
2012	Laid	Mandy	1 episode
2012	Any Questions for Ben?	Emily	
2010	Sleuth 101	Judy	1 episode
2009	The Librarians	School Teacher	1 episode
2005–2006	The Ronnie Johns Half Hour	Various	26 episodes

== Personal life ==
Ward has been open about her struggles with anxiety and is an active advocate for mental health in Australia. She also spoke about her issues with Irritable Bowel Syndrome in her 2015 show "What If There's No Toilet?" and about anxiety, depression and insomnia as part of her BBC Radio 4 series "Appisodes". She's also discussed perinatal depression after finally becoming pregnant at 38, followed by separating from her husband.
