= Daleys Point, New South Wales =

Daleys Point Central Coast, New South Wales
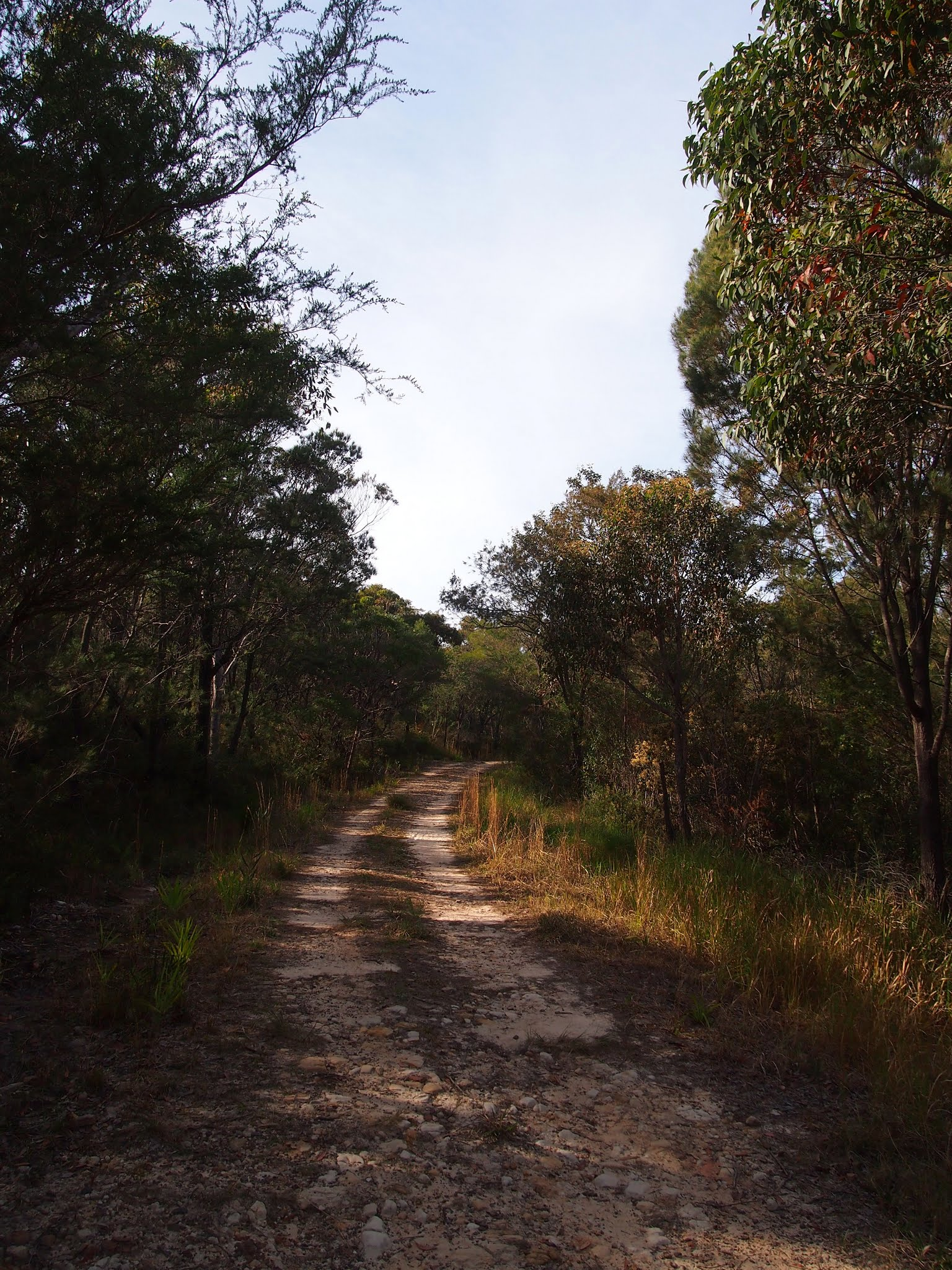

- Coordinates: 33°30′11″S 151°20′49″E
- Population: 681 (2016 census)
  - Density: 2,300/km^{2} (5,900/sq mi)
- Postcode(s): 2257
- Area: 0.3 km^{2} (0.1 sq mi)
- Location: 5 km (3 mi) SE of Woy Woy
- LGA(s): Central Coast Council
- Parish: Kincumber
- State electorate(s): Terrigal
- Federal division(s): Robertson
Suburbs around Daleys Point:
St Huberts Island	Empire Bay	Empire Bay
Blackwall	Daleys Point	Empire Bay
Booker Bay	Killcare	Killcare Heights

Daleys Point is a south-eastern suburb of the Central Coast region of New South Wales, Australia on the Bouddi Peninsula. It is part of the Central Coast Council local government area. The median house price in January 2010 was A$950,000.

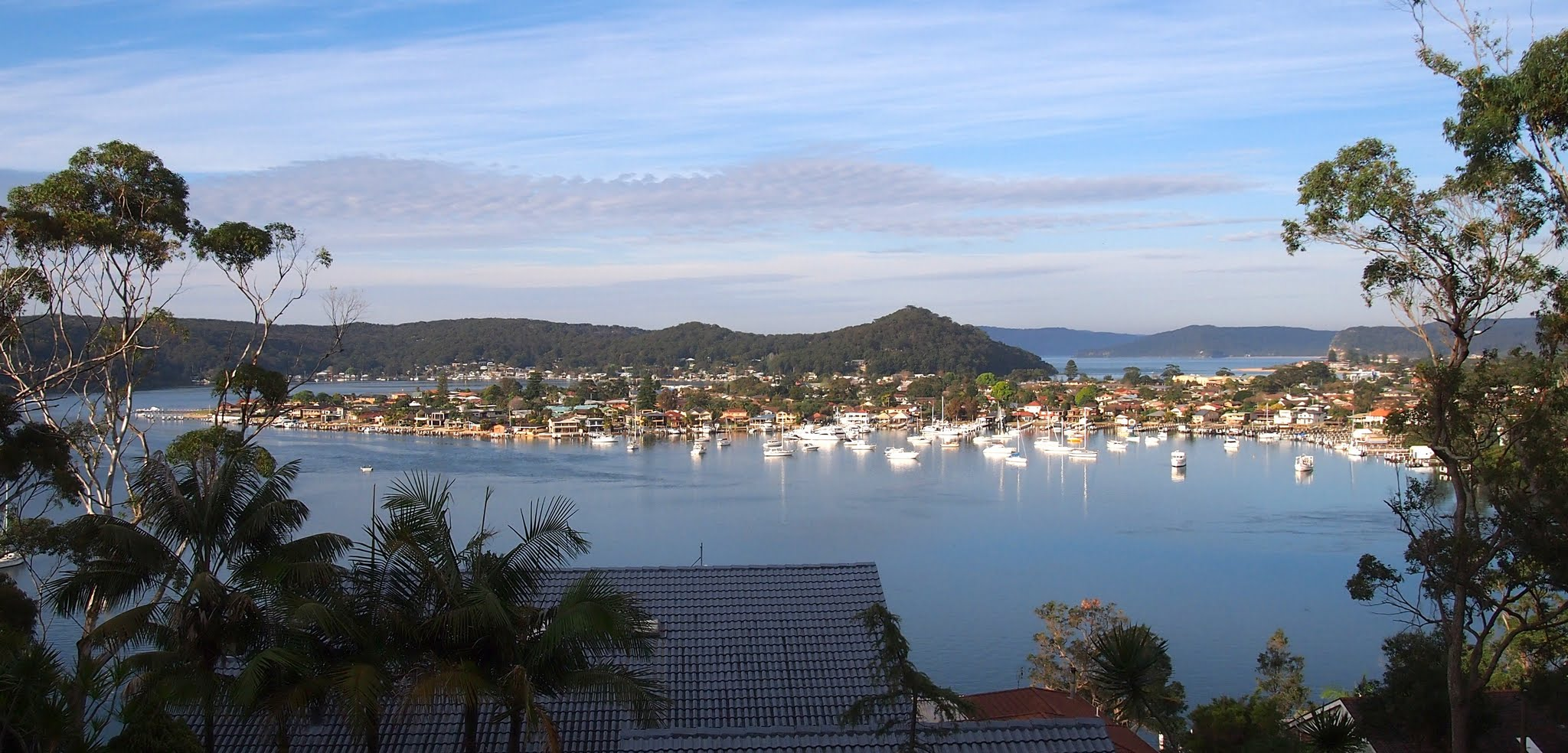
Daleys Point, NSW

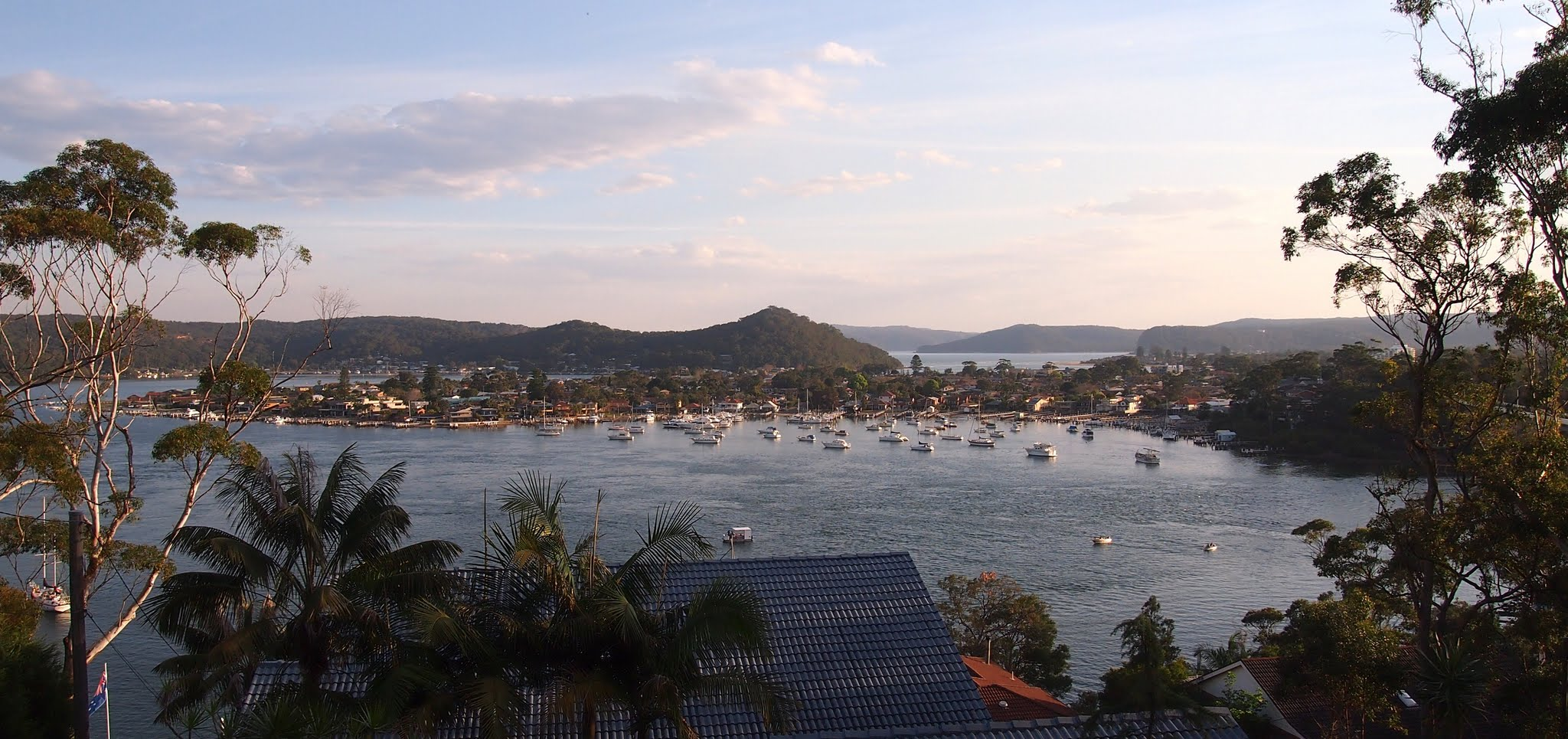
Daleys Point

== Population ==
In the 2016 Census, there were 681 people in Daleys Point. 74.0% of people were born in Australia and 87.8% of people spoke only English at home. The most common responses for religion were Catholic 30.0%, Anglican 23.4% and No Religion 22.6%.

== History ==
Daleys Point was the site of a shipyard operated by the Beattie family, during the first half of the 20th century.
