= Killcare, New South Wales =

Coordinates: 33°31′55″S 151°22′05″E

Killcare
- Suburb
- Interactive map of Killcare
- Country: Australia
- State: New South Wales
- City: Central Coast
- LGA: Central Coast Council
- Location: 10 km (6.2 mi) SE of Woy Woy; 21 km (13 mi) S of Gosford; 95 km (59 mi) NNE of Sydney

Government
  - State electorate: Terrigal
  - Federal division: Robertson

Area
  - Total: 2.4 km^{2} (0.93 sq mi)
- Elevation: 25 m (82 ft)

Population
  - Total: 517 (SAL 2021)
- Postcode: 2257
- Parish: Kincumber
Suburbs around Killcare
Brisbane Water		Killcare Heights
Hardys Bay	Killcare	Killcare Heights
Hardys Bay		Tasman Sea

Killcare is a south-eastern suburb and village located on the Bouddi Peninsula on the Central Coast of the state of New South Wales, Australia. It is part of the Central Coast Council local government area.

Prior to the arrival of European Settlement, Aboriginals from the coastal Guringai (Ku-ring-gai) tribe lived in and around Hardys Bay area. Evidence is to be found today in rock carvings and middens found in numerous locations around the area. After British settlement the area was established as a fishing and farming community. The name probably originated later as it was subdivided early last century as "killing one's cares".

The Killcare area encompasses both the beach and bay side of the Bouddi Peninsula and is flanked by the Bouddi National Park. Killcare retains a small fishing village atmosphere centred on the Killcare Store. The village has an unusually broad variety of shops including yacht charters, art gallery, hairdresser, fashion boutique, restaurant and cafes and real estate agents. Killcare Marina has permanent moorings.

The area has a strong community with many associations including the new Pretty Beach Community Pre-School and Pretty Beach Public School at neighbouring Pretty Beach. The neighbouring suburb Hardys Bay encompasses the south sector of the bay where the Community Church and the Hardys Bay RSL Club are located. The RSL hosts a series of local clubs including the Hardys Bay Hackers Golf Club and the Frigid Digits winter swimmers.

Killcare is also home to the Killcare Rural Fire Service. The volunteer brigade services the surrounding suburbs and the Bouddi National Park, conducting controlled hazard reduction burning and a wide variety of other safety and hazard prevention activities.

Killcare Beach is home to Killcare Surf Lifesaving Club, built in the 1930s, rebuilt in 1973, and then completely demolished and built again in 2009 as a modern state-of-the-art facility, and conducts beach patrols during weekends and public holidays in the summer season. The club has memberships for patrolling adults, children's nippers, youth rookies and associate supporting members. Putty Beach is the Northern end of the beach.

== Development ==
Large scale rutile mining took place over the hill at Putty and Killcare beaches in the 1960s and stripped the beach of its large sand dunes and destroyed many native plants, molluscs and animals. Miners had agreed to revegetate the area which they did with the noxious pest bitou bush (Chrysanthemoides monilifera), which the various land care groups are now trying to eradicate.

Over the last 30 years property values in the area have reached into the millions of dollars as it is a prime location for holiday houses and retirement, like many other coastal areas within close proximity of a major city.

This pressure to develop has seen many fibro cottages demolished and replaced with million dollar weekenders. Some heritage sites, including the Ferry Masters cottage at Wagstaffe have been illegally demolished and developed despite council attempts to prevent this; prosecution of the developers was unsuccessful due to a technicality.

=== Marina development ===
In late 2007 a scheme to develop the existing marina was presented to the community by the Marina's CEO, Michael Sparks. This $13 million development would see the existing marina as well as the historic Hardys Bay wharf replaced by a much larger structure containing: 100 car parks over the water; an increase in the number of berths from 23 to 100; additional retail, cafe and restaurant space; as well as providing a 7-day a week boat maintenance facility. Additionally, any applications for new or upgraded marinas must include the provision of a 24-hour sewerage pump-out facility.

Sparks also advised that this marina project application would circumvent the local council approval process and utilise what is called the Part 3A method of approval. This is a reference to the new provision in the Environmental Planning and Assessment Act which reduces the involvement of the community in the original decision-making process. The decision makers for applications made by marinas under this law are the minister for planning and director general, Department of Planning. While the developers maintain that there will be little environmental impact, a stand of grey mangroves (Avicennia marina) will have to be removed to make way for the structure, and degradation of the beds of sea grasses is also possible.

Following a presentation to the Hardys Bay Resident Group on 19 February 2008 by Sparks, the group rejected the redevelopment plan. In March 2008, the Wagstaffe to Killcare Community Association also announced that they could not support the current proposal. In early 2008 the plan was rejected by the Department of Planning after numerous complaints from as far away as Slovenia.

=== 58-62 Araluen Drive development ===
In September 2008 plans were lodged with the former Gosford City Council for a major re-development of the site in Araluen Drive and an adjoining residential development. The proposed development included a large, seven level building covering three blocks of land and requiring the removal of over 100 large trees. Four new commercial properties were proposed and nine terraced apartments were to step up the slope behind the retail premises. Underground parking for 34 cars was to be provided. The initial plans received over 600 objections and was rejected by the former Gosford City Council. An amended plan was lodged and received over 700 objections. Accordingly, the council rejected the development as being out of character with local planning requirements. In late 2009 the developers (Bespoke Properties P/L) subsequently appealed to the Land and Environment Court of New South Wales seeking a review of the council's decision to disallow that development at Hardys Bay. Hearings commenced on 2 March, with an onsite visit attended by the court, legal representatives and over 200 local residents. The appeal was dismissed by Commissioner Brown on Monday 8 March. Reasons cited for disallowing the development included;

- The proposal was unacceptable due to its visual impact and on the basis of character.
- There was no justification for the consolidation of the lots.
- The proposal failed to respect the vegetation on the site or the slope of the site.
- The zone of a site was not an entitlement for development but rather a maximum.

== Population ==
In the 2016 Census, there were 473 people in Killcare. 76.4% of people were born in Australia and 86.7% of people spoke only English at home. The most common response for religion was No Religion at 35.6%.

== Notable residents ==
- Graeme Blundell, an Australian actor and writer notable for his work in the Star Wars franchise, maintains a house in the suburb.
- Greig Pickhaver, also known as HG Nelson, well known actor, comedian and writer resides in the area and has been involved in numerous community charity and fund raising events.
- John Singleton, Australian advertising guru, developer and entrepreneur, is known for his involvement in the community via the Killcare Surfclub and his development of several exclusive houses, resorts and restaurants in the area.
- Felicity Ward, comedian, grew up in Hardys Bay from 11 until 20 years old.
