= Pretty Beach, New South Wales =

Coordinates: 33°31′41″S 151°20′49″E

Pretty Beach Central Coast, New South Wales
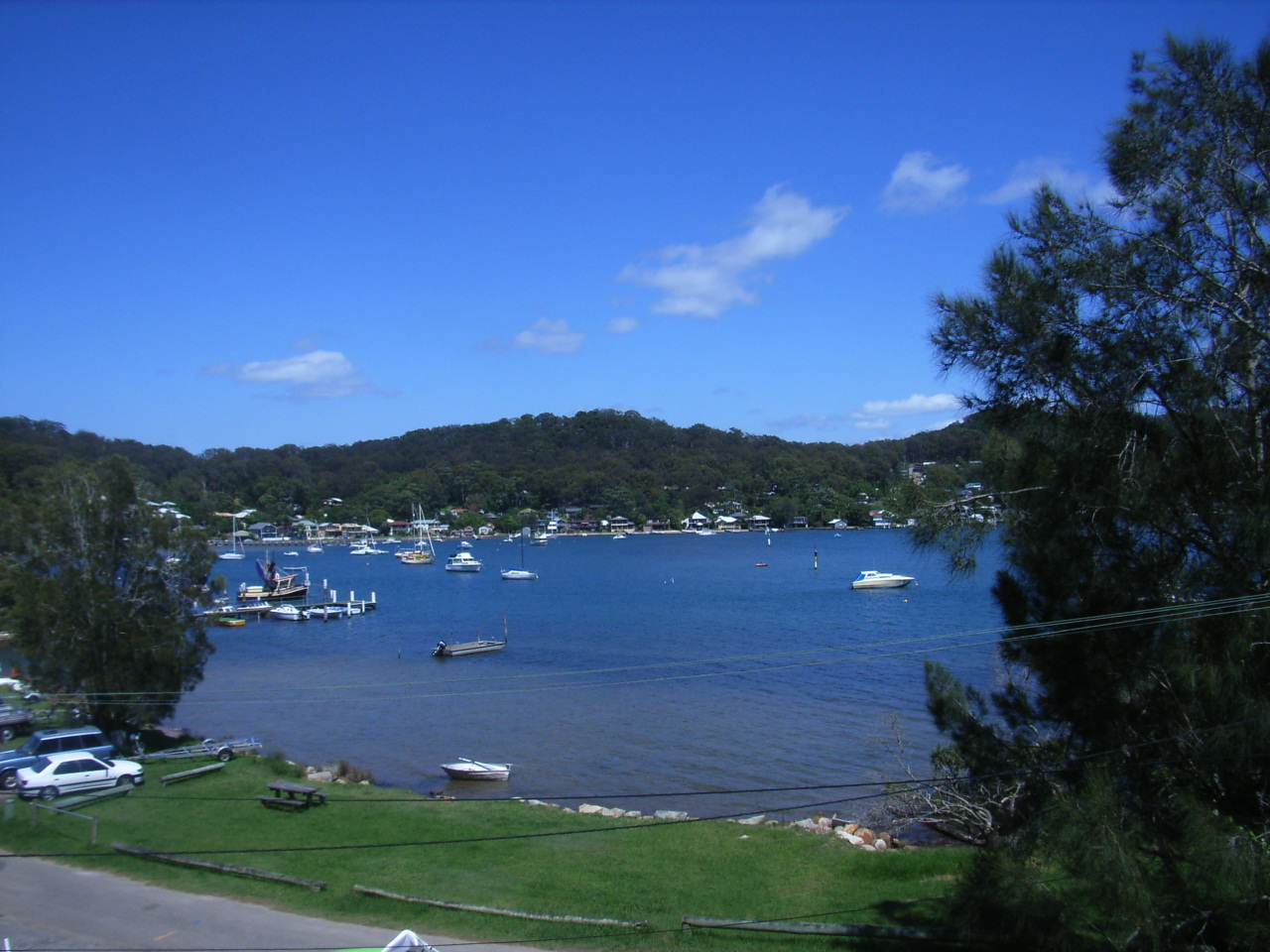
- Araluen Drive, featuring the bay and wharf. Directly opposite is Wagstaffe.
- Population: 314 (SAL 2021)
- Postcode(s): 2257
- Elevation: 2 m (7 ft)
- Location: 24 km (15 mi) S of Gosford; 9 km (6 mi) SSE of Woy Woy; 96 km (60 mi) NNE of Sydney
- LGA(s): Central Coast Council
- Parish: Kincumber
- State electorate(s): Terrigal
- Federal division(s): Robertson
Suburbs around Pretty Beach:
Wagstaffe
Wagstaffe	Pretty Beach	Hardys Bay
	Box Head	Box Head

Pretty Beach is a south-eastern suburb of the Central Coast region of New South Wales, Australia on the Bouddi Peninsula. It is part of the Central Coast Council local government area.
