= Broken Bay =

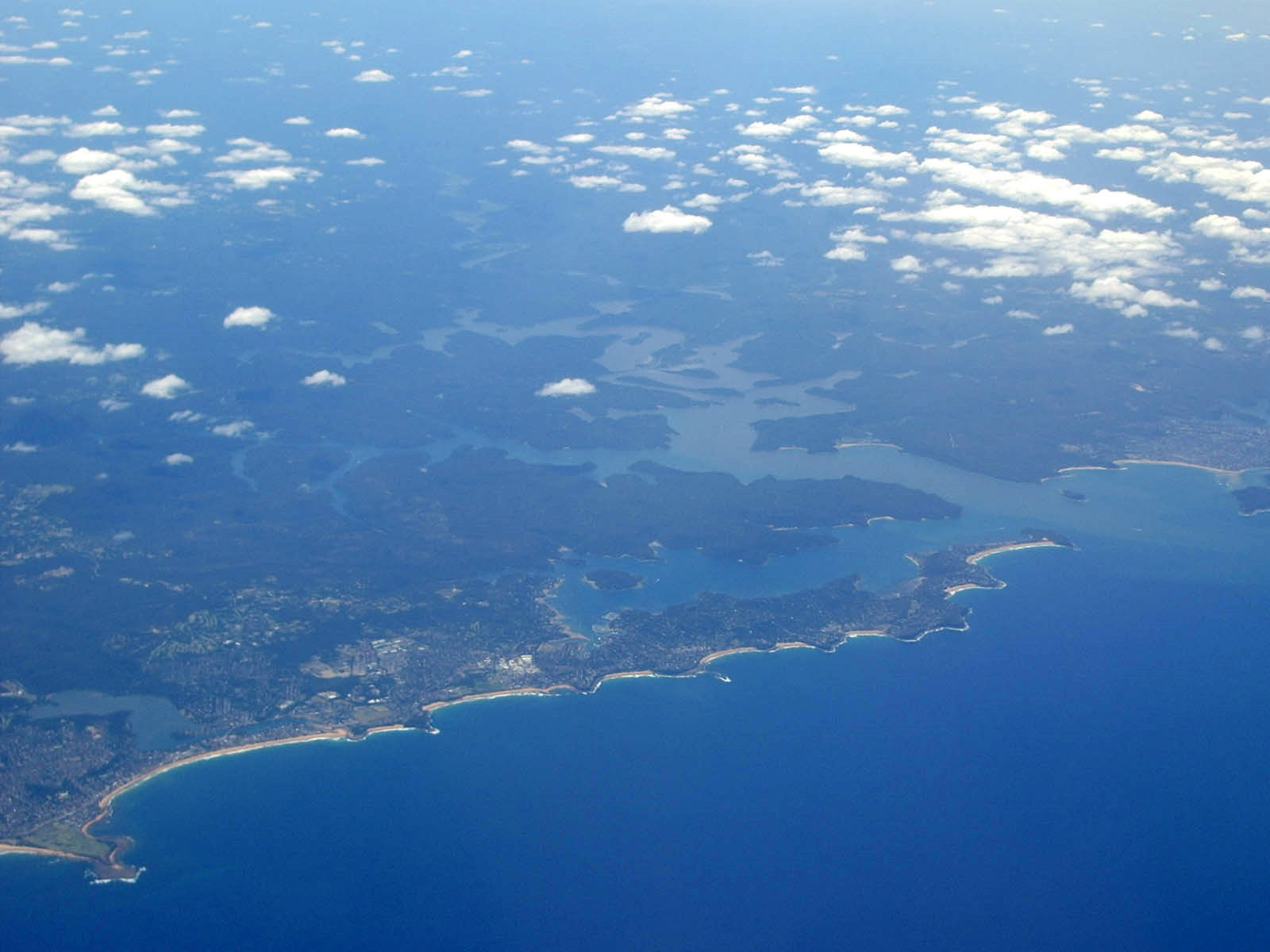
- Aerial photograph showing the mouth of Broken Bay as it flows into the Tasman Sea, as seen looking across Sydney's North Shore and Northern Beaches

- Location within New South Wales
- Location: Central Coast, New South Wales, Australia
- Coordinates: 33°34′07″S 151°19′00″E
- Type: Bay
- Primary inflows: Hawkesbury River, Brisbane Water, Pittwater
- Surface area: 17.1 km^{2} (6.6 sq mi)
- Average depth: 9.8 m (32 ft)
- Water volume: 0.17 km^{3} (0.041 cu mi)
- Islands: Lion Island
- Website: NSW Environment and Heritage webpage

Broken Bay, a semi-mature tide-dominated drowned valley estuary, is a large inlet of the Tasman Sea located about 50 kilometres (31 mi) north of Sydney on the Central Coast of New South Wales, Australia; being one of the bodies of water that separate Greater Metropolitan Sydney from the Central Coast. Broken Bay is the first major bay north of Sydney Harbour in the state capital of Sydney.

Broken Bay has its origin at the confluence of the Hawkesbury River, Pittwater, and Brisbane Water and flows openly into the Tasman Sea.

The total surface area of the bay is approximately 17.1 square kilometres (6.6 sq mi).

== Geography ==
The entrance to Broken Bay lies between the northern Box Head and Barrenjoey Head to the south. Barrenjoey Lighthouse was constructed in 1881 to guide ships away from the prominent headland. The bay comprises three arms, being the prominent estuary of the Hawkesbury River in the west, Pittwater to the south, and Brisbane Water to the north. These three arms are flooded rivers (rias) formed at a time when the sea level was much lower than it is at the present day.

The Hawkesbury River flows from the confluence of the Grose and Nepean Rivers at the base of the Blue Mountains.

Pittwater extends south from Broken Bay and is the northernmost extent of the greater Sydney area. Pittwater's calm waters make it a popular sailing area. West Head, west of Barrenjoey Head, marks the divide between Pittwater and the Hawkesbury.

Brisbane Water is the northern arm of Broken Bay and has the towns of Gosford and Woy Woy on its shores.

Lion Island, named for its profile's resemblance to a Sphinx from some viewpoints, is located at the entrance of Broken Bay. Lion Island Nature Reserve covers the entire island, and is home to a colony of fairy penguins.

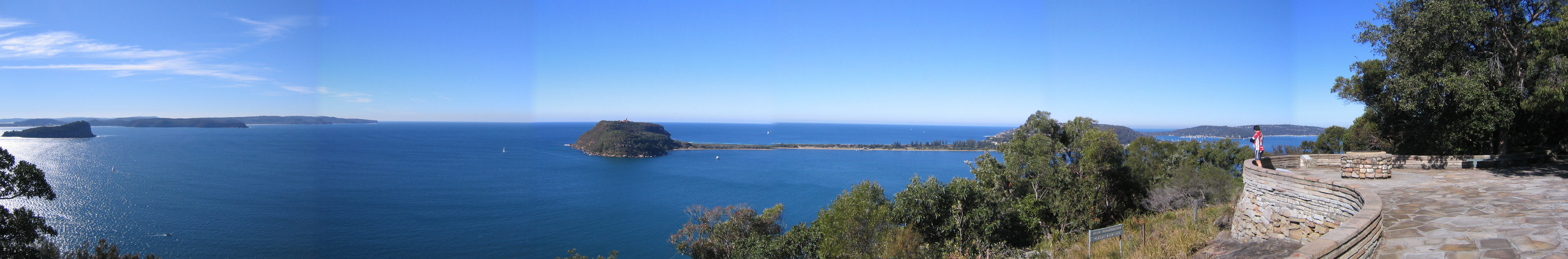
Broken Bay from West Head
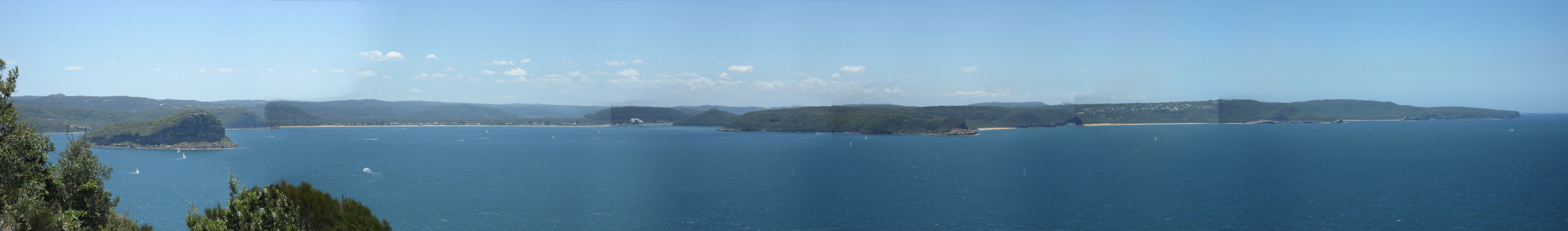
Broken Bay from Barrenjoey Lighthouse

== European discovery ==
James Cook recorded "broken land" seen north of Port Jackson just before sunset on 7 May 1770, and named it Broken Bay. However, there has been some controversy over whether what is now known as 'Broken Bay' was what was sighted by Cook.

Matthew Flinders, The colonists have called this place Broken Bay, but it is not what was so named by Captain Cook.

Ray Parkin in his book H. M. Bark Endeavour claims that the modern 'Broken Bay' was passed unremarked at night, and that Cook was in fact referring to the area around Narrabeen Lagoon. Matthew Flinders placed Cook's 'Broken Bay' at 33° 42' South, near to the mouth of Narrabeen Lagoon.

Whatever the case, Governor Phillip was the first non-Indigenous person to examine the present day Broken Bay in a longboat from the Sirius on 2 March 1788.

== Role in attack on Sydney Harbour ==
On 28 November 2005, documentary film-maker Damien Lay claimed that the wreckage of M-24, a Japanese midget submarine involved in the attack on Sydney Harbour in 1942 and disappeared soon afterward, was buried under sand on the seabed, just east of Lion Island. Lay claimed to have confirmed that copper wiring found at the site was consistent with that used in similar Japanese vessels. A few weeks later, New South Wales Planning Minister Frank Sartor announced that sonar scans conducted by the New South Wales Heritage Office at the location specified had found no trace of the lost submarine.

M-24 was eventually found approximately 13 kilometres south of Broken Bay, 5 kilometres off Bungan Head, proving the hypothesis that M-24 chose to not draw attention to its mother submarines to the south of Sydney Harbour and instead moved north towards Broken Bay.

== Gallery ==
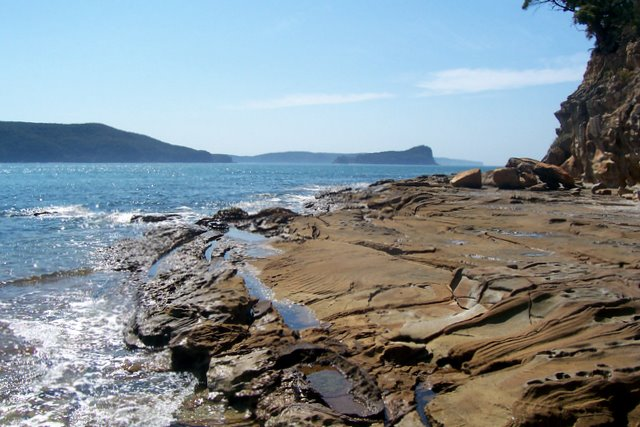
Broken Bay from Flint and Steel Beach

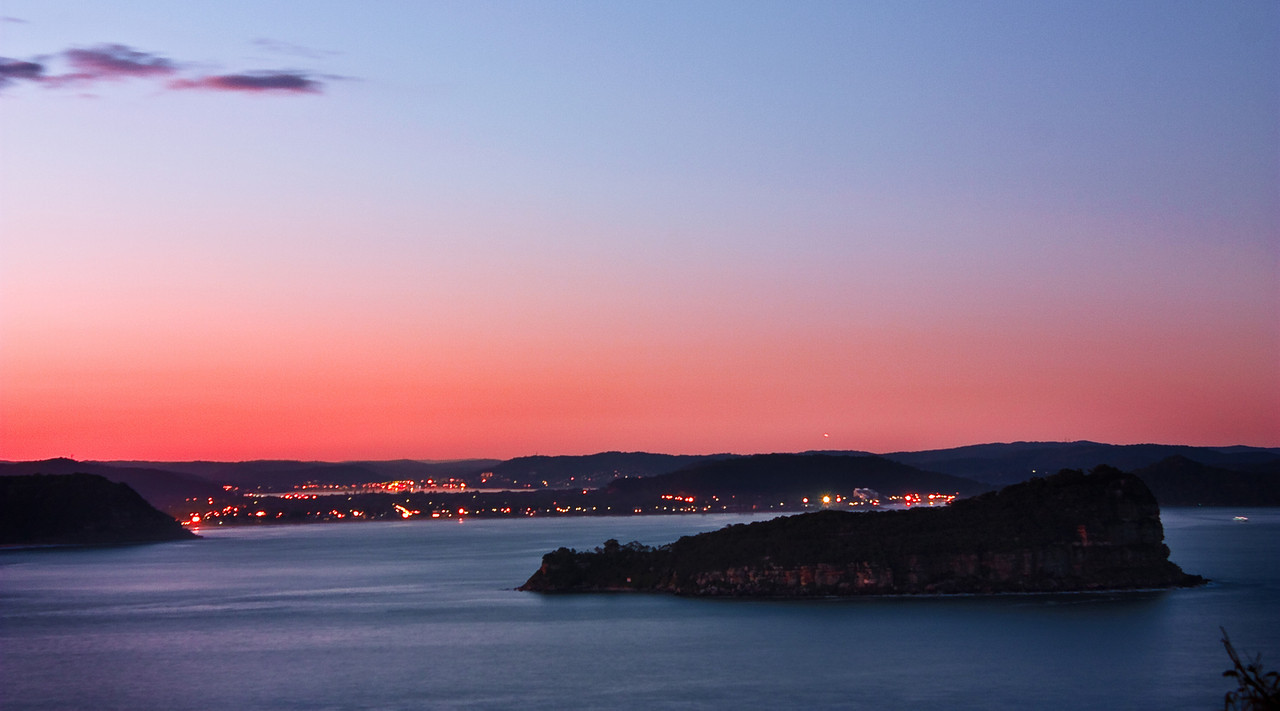
Lion Island with the Central Coast in the background

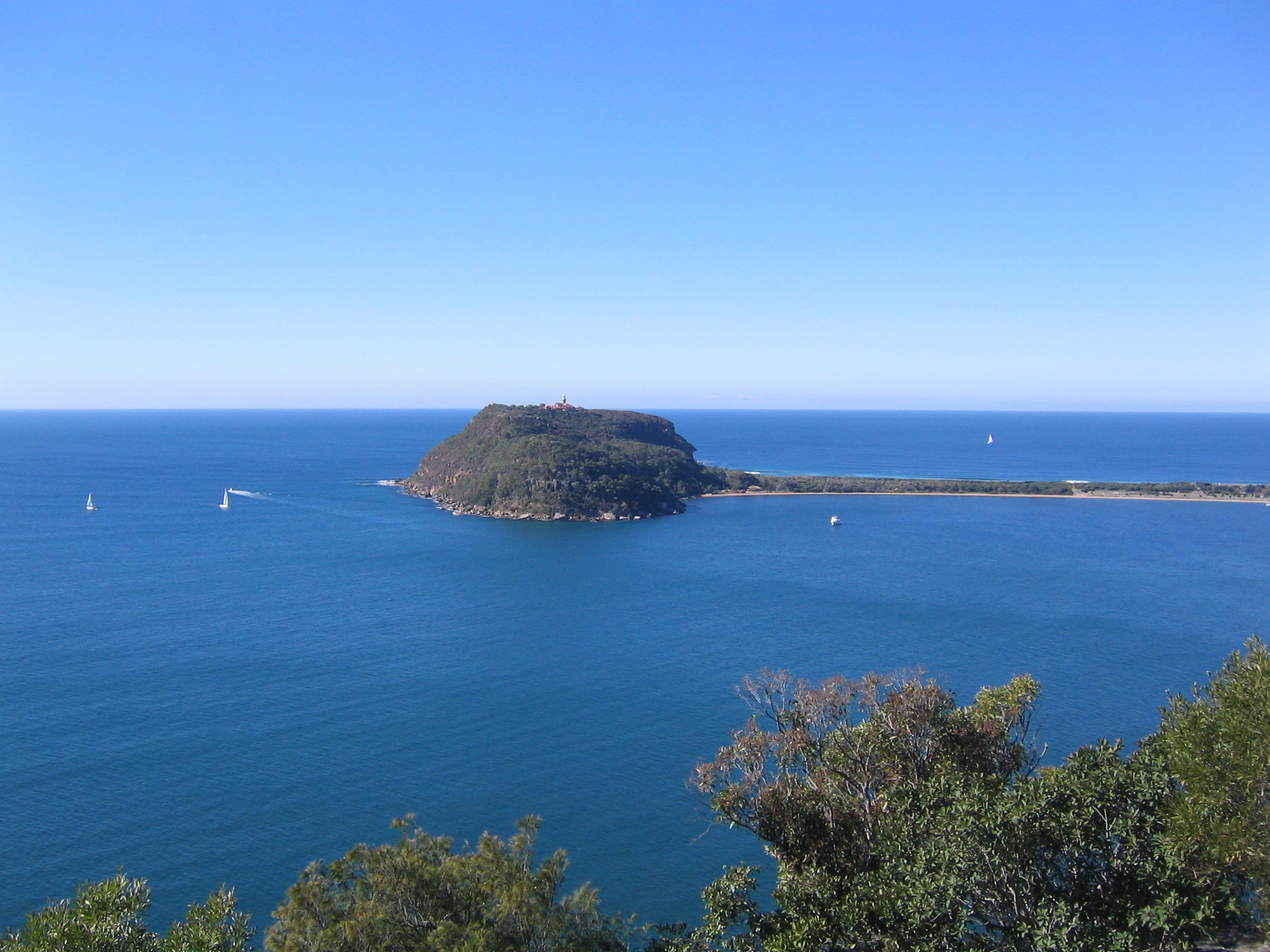
Barrenjoey Headland

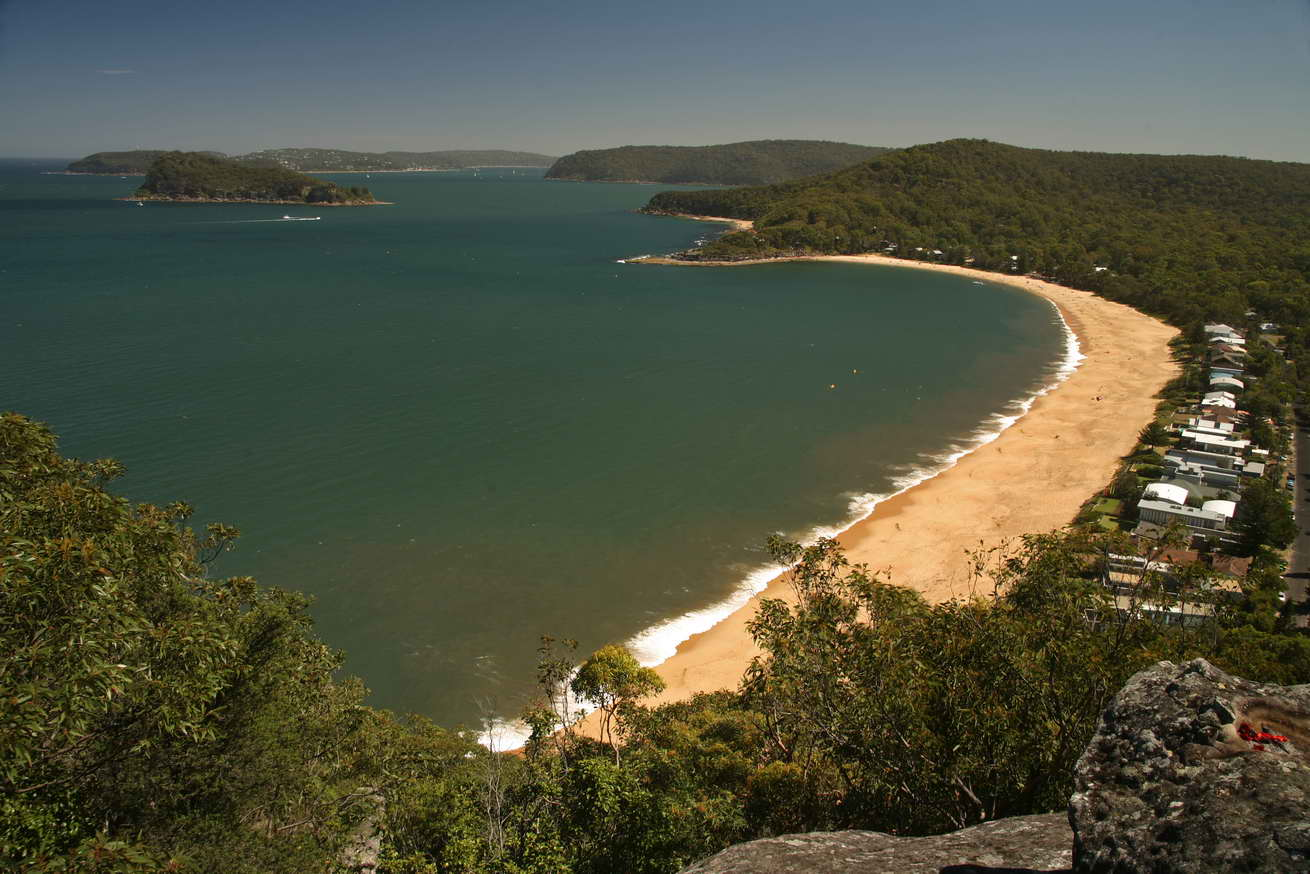
Pearl Beach with Lion Island in the middleground and Pittwater in the background

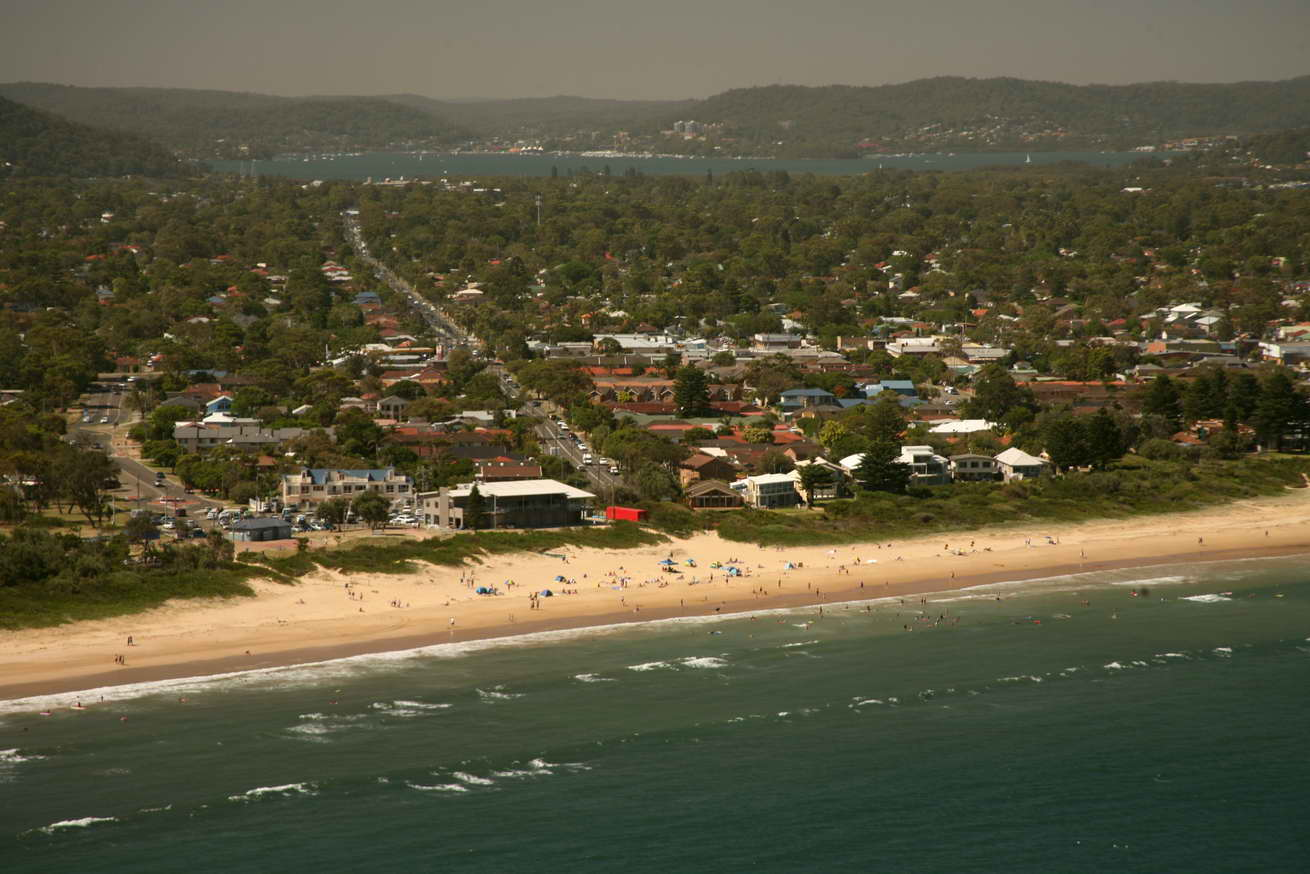
Umina Beach on the northern side of Broken Bay

== See also ==
- Lion Island
