= Wagstaffe, New South Wales =

Wagstaffe Central Coast, New South Wales
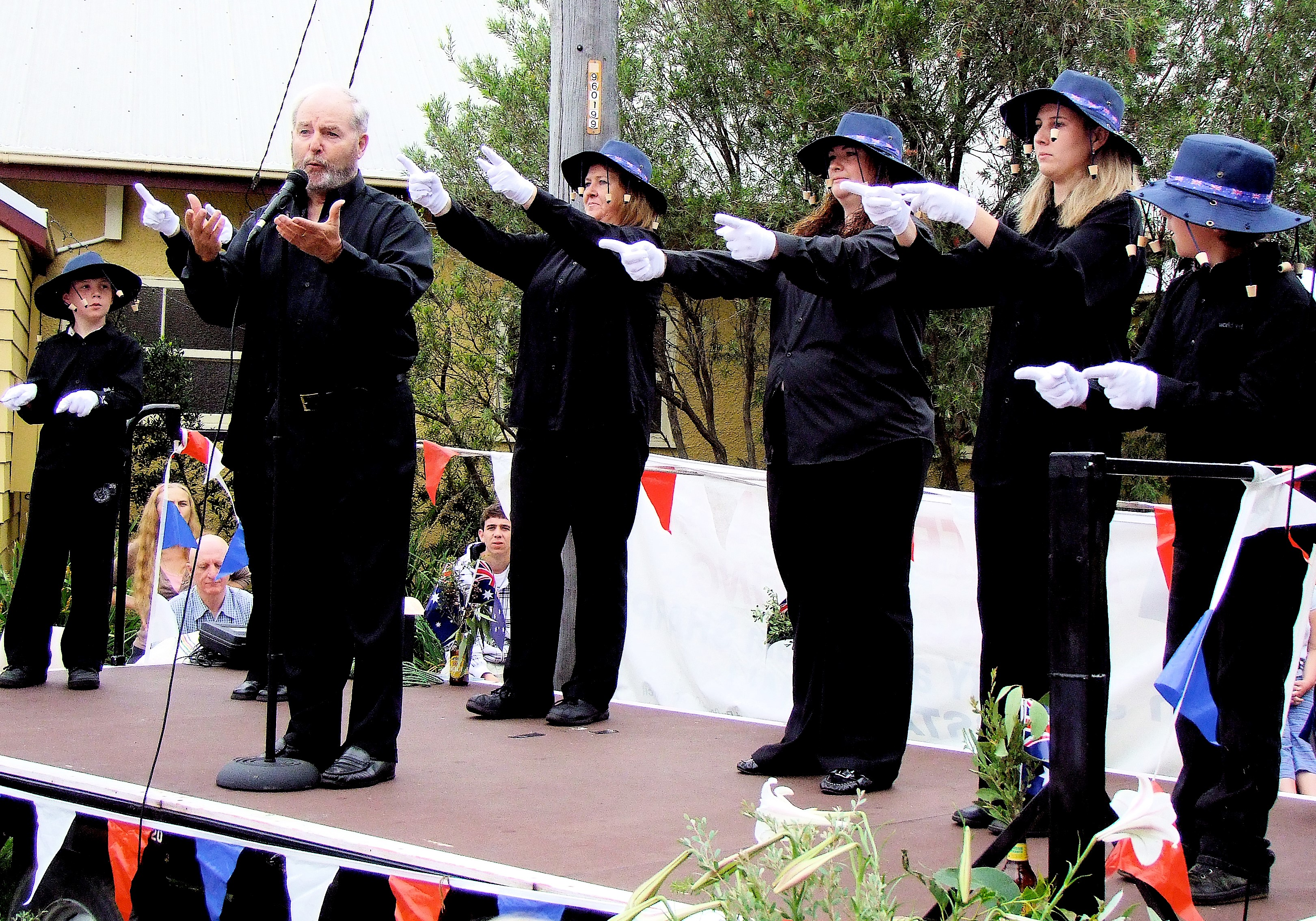
- Choir performing at Wagstaffe

- Coordinates: 33°31′26″S 151°20′35″E
- Population: 222 (2016 census)
  - Density: 560/km^{2} (1,440/sq mi)
- Postcode(s): 2257
- Elevation: 6 m (20 ft)
- Area: 0.4 km^{2} (0.2 sq mi)
- Location: 24 km (15 mi) S of Gosford; 7 km (4 mi) SSE of Woy Woy; 96 km (60 mi) NNE of Sydney
- LGA(s): Central Coast Council
- Parish: Kincumber
- State electorate(s): Terrigal
- Federal division(s): Robertson
Suburbs around Wagstaffe:
Ettalong Beach	Ettalong Beach	Booker Bay
Ettalong Beach	Wagstaffe	Pretty Beach
Broken Bay		Pretty Beach

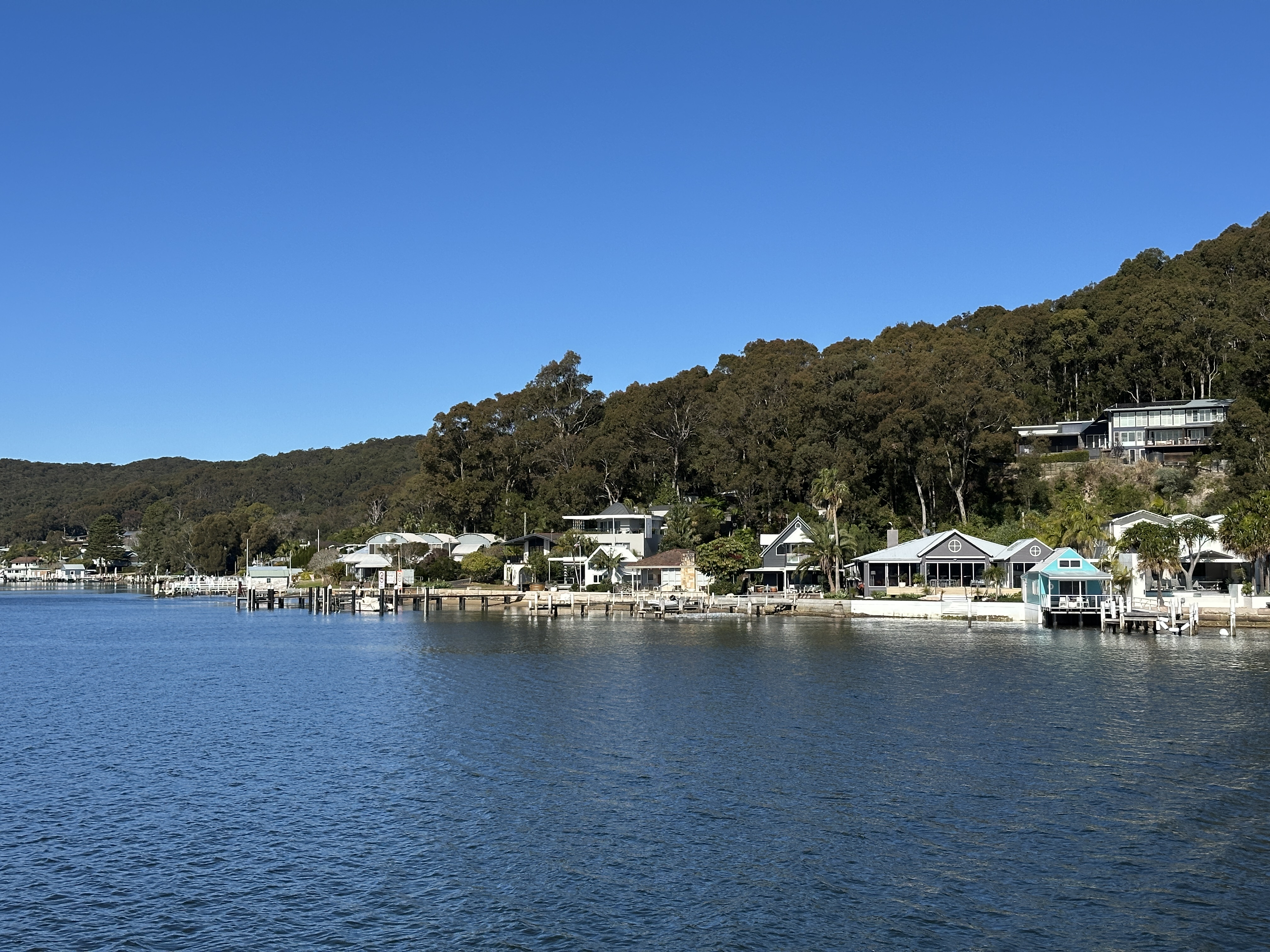
Houses along the waterfront at Wagstaffe, New South Wales

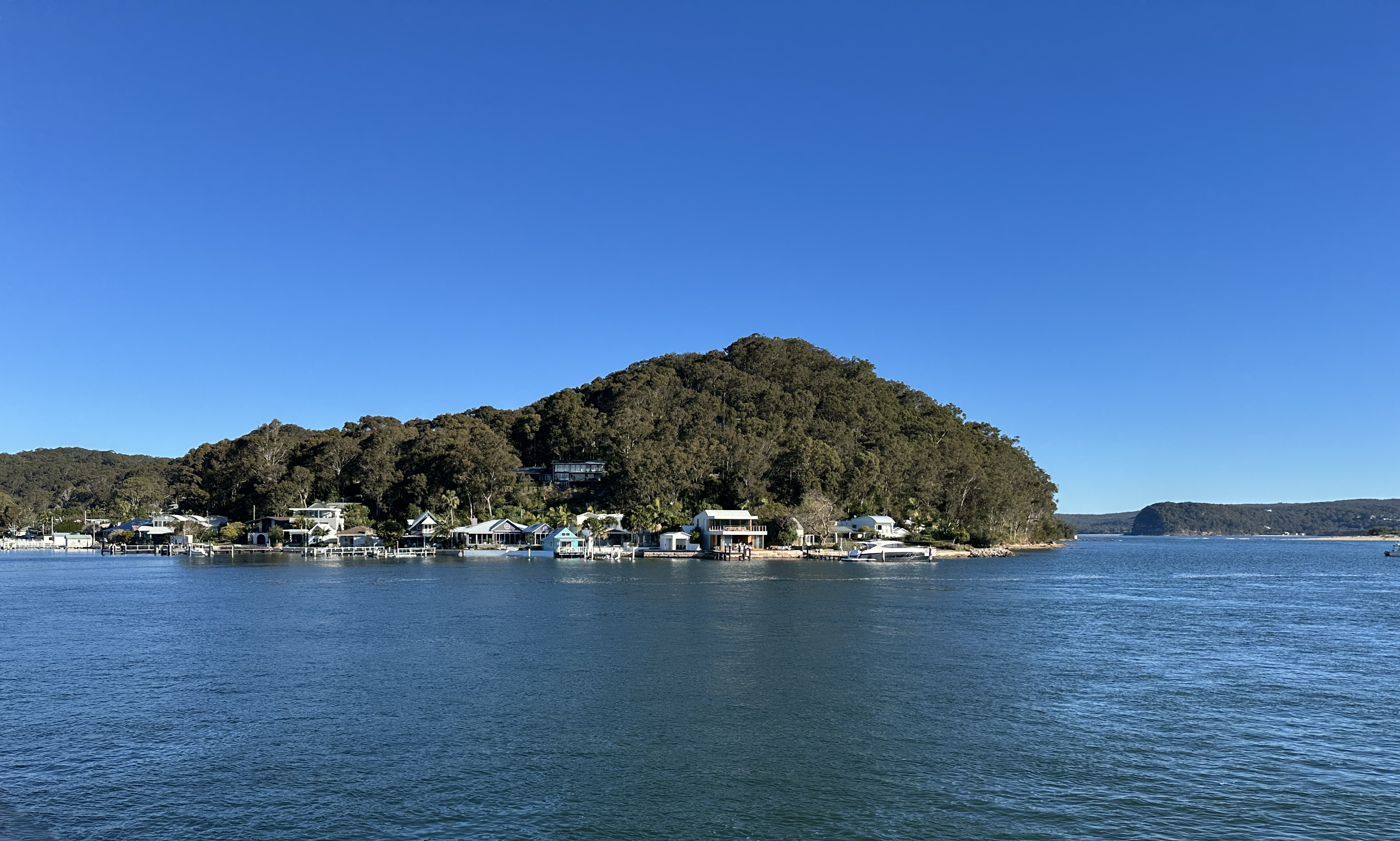
Wagstaffe Point from Ettalong

Wagstaffe is a south-eastern suburb of the Central Coast region of New South Wales, Australia on the Bouddi Peninsula. It is part of the Central Coast Council local government area. It was named after Captain Wagstaffe, one of the first settlers in the area.

It has a general store, which is also the local post office. It is a thin sliver of around 200 houses between the bay and the bush (Bouddi National Park). Historically it was also known as Wagstaffe Point. In aboriginal dialect the point is called Kourang Gourang. A ferry service operates between Wagstaffe and Palm Beach (via Ettalong). Travel time is 30 minutes.
