= Horsfield Bay =

Coordinates: 33°29′31″S 151°18′14″E

- Suburb
- Interactive map of Horsfield Bay
- Country: Australia
- State: New South Wales
- City: Central Coast
- LGA: Central Coast Council
- Location: 17 km (11 mi) SSW of Gosford; 5 km (3.1 mi) W of Woy Woy; 77 km (48 mi) N of Sydney

Government
  - State electorate: Gosford
  - Federal division: Robertson

Area
  - Total: 0.7 km^{2} (0.27 sq mi)
- Elevation: 26 m (85 ft)

Population
  - Total: 544 (2016 census)
  - Density: 780/km^{2} (2,010/sq mi)
- Postcode: 2256
- Parish: Patonga
Suburbs around Horsfield Bay
Kariong	Woy Woy Bay	Phegans Bay
Brisbane Water National Park	Horsfield Bay	Woy Woy
Wondabyne	Umina Beach	Woy Woy

Horsfield Bay is a locality of the Central Coast region of New South Wales, Australia 5 kilometres (3 mi) west of Woy Woy between Brisbane Water National Park and Woy Woy Inlet. It is part of the Central Coast Council local government area.

== Demographics ==
In the 2016 Census, there were 544 people in Horsfield Bay. 71.0% of people were born in Australia and 83.5% of people spoke only English at home. The most common responses for religion were No Religion 37.7% and Catholic 20.8%.
