= Woy Woy Bay =

- Suburb
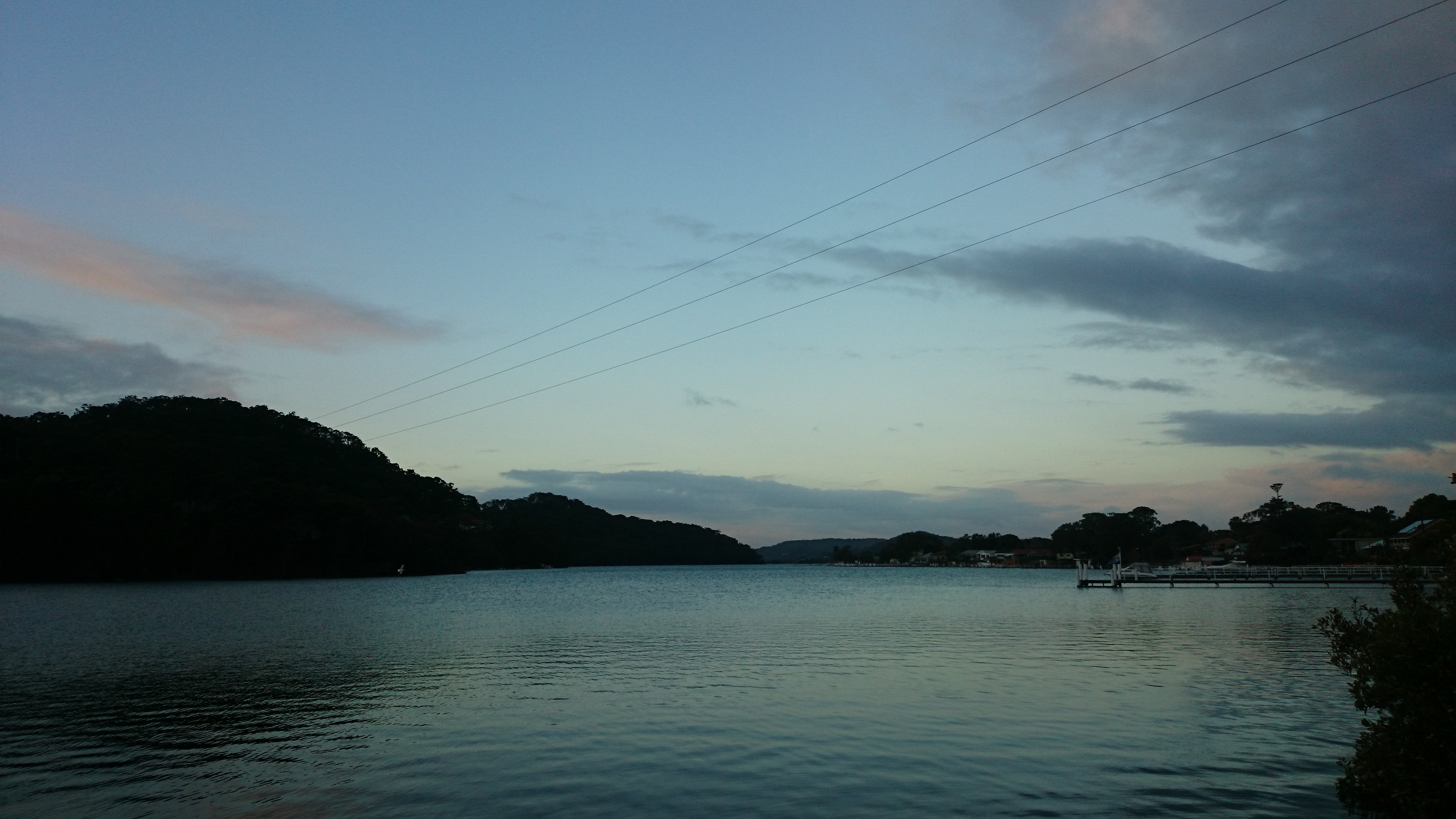

- Interactive map of Woy Woy Bay
- Coordinates: 33°29′2″S 151°18′50″E
- Country: Australia
- State: New South Wales
- City: Central Coast
- LGA: Central Coast Council
- Location: 14 km (8.7 mi) SW of Gosford; 4 km (2.5 mi) NW of Woy Woy; 79 km (49 mi) N of Sydney

Government
  - State electorate: Gosford
  - Federal division: Robertson
- Elevation: 16 m (52 ft)
- Postcode: 2256
- Parish: Patonga
Suburbs around Woy Woy Bay
Kariong	Kariong	Tascott
Kariong	Woy Woy Bay	Koolewong
Wondabyne	Woy Woy	Phegans Bay

Woy Woy Bay is a suburb located in the Central Coast region of New South Wales, Australia, as part of the Central Coast Council local government area. Most of the suburb's area belongs to the Brisbane Water National Park, although a small community on Woy Woy Bay (part of Brisbane Water) containing a community hall, public reserve and wharf is also located within the suburb. Woy Woy Bay is commonly used by boaters on the weekend because of the open expanses of the bay. The main thoroughfare is Taylor Street.

== Notable residents ==
- John Della Bosca (1956–), former politician: New South Wales Legislative Council 1999–2010.
- Belinda Neal (1963–), former politician: Australian House of Representatives (2007–2010); New South Wales Legislative Council (1994–1998) and Gosford City Council Alderman (1992–1994).
