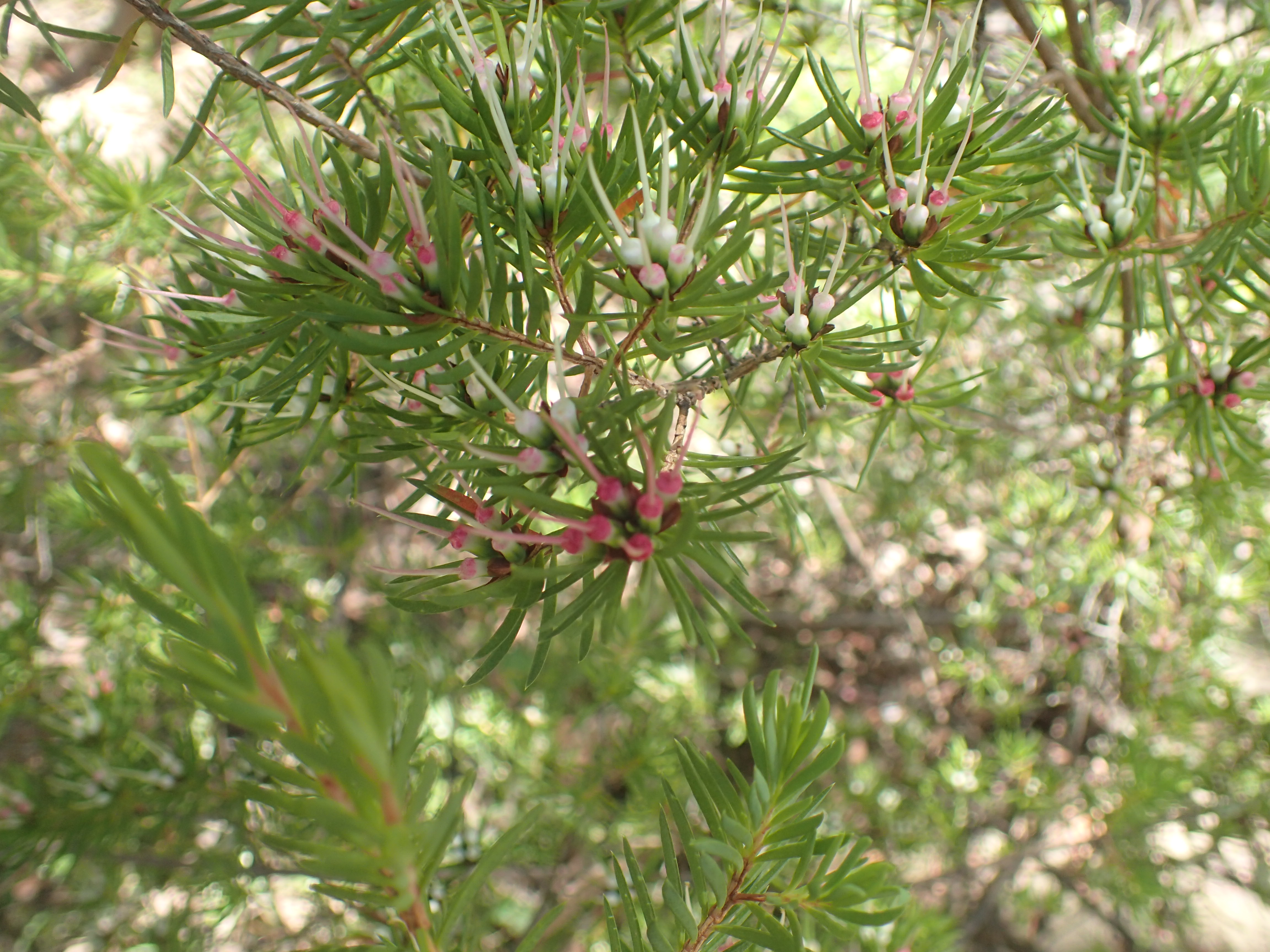
- Darwinia procera in the ANBG

Scientific classification
- Kingdom: Plantae
- Clade: Tracheophytes
- Clade: Angiosperms
- Clade: Eudicots
- Clade: Rosids
- Order: Myrtales
- Family: Myrtaceae
- Genus: Darwinia
- Species: D. procera

Binomial name
- Darwinia procera B.G.Briggs
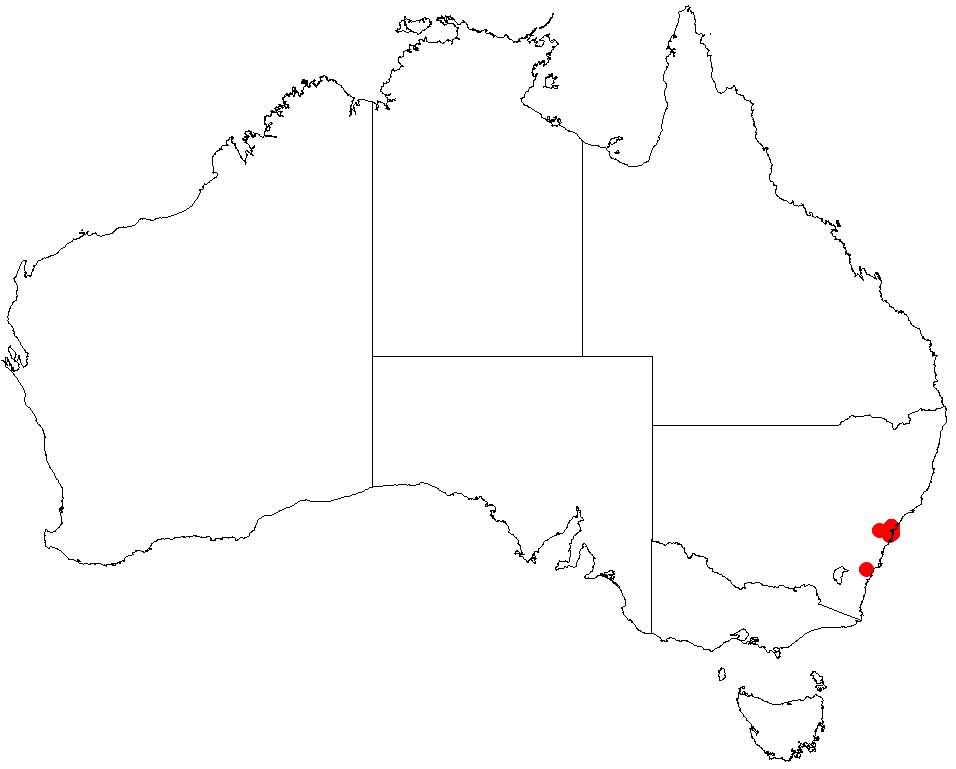
- Occurrence data from AVH

= Darwinia procera =

Species of flowering plant

Darwinia procera is a plant in the myrtle family Myrtaceae and is endemic to a small area in New South Wales. It is a shrub with laterally compressed leaves, so that they are thicker than wide. The flowers are reddish-purple and arranged in groups of four near the ends of the branches. Although rare in nature, this species is often grown by native plant enthusiasts.

== Description ==
Darwinia procera is an erect shrub which grows to a height of about 3 metres (10 ft) and has upright branches. The leaves are laterally compressed and arranged in a decussate pattern along the branches. The leaves are 10–25 millimetres (0.4–1 in) long, glabrous, have a bluish tinge, curve upwards and taper to a point.

The flowers are arranged in clusters of about four on the ends of the branches, each flower on a stalk 1–2 millimetres (0.04–0.08 in) long. the groups surrounded by reddish bracts 4–13 millimetres (0.2–0.5 in) long. The floral cup is 5–8 millimetres (0.2–0.3 in) long and about 2 millimetres (0.08 in) wide and the petals form a white tube surrounding and enclosing the stamens. The style is white, 14–20 millimetres (0.6–0.8 in) long and extends beyond the end of the flower tube. Flowering occurs between late winter and early summer.

== Taxonomy ==
Darwinia procera was first formally described in 1962 by Barbara Briggs in Contributions from the New South Wales National Herbarium from specimens she collected near Kariong in 1961. The specific epithet (procera) is derived a Latin word meaning "tall", "slender" or "long", possibly referring to the growth habit of the plant.

== Distribution and habitat ==
This darwinia grows in forest and scrub near the top of sandstone gullies on the central coast north of Sydney.

== Conservation ==
Darwinia procera is a rare plant but is not considered to be in danger at present. A significant population is preserved in the Brisbane Water National Park.

== Use in horticulture ==
Darwinia procera is reasonably well-known in horticulture with its unusual foliage being a feature. It can be propagated from seed but is easier to raise from cuttings. It is hardy in well-drained, sandy soil in a partly-shaded situation with occasional watering in long dry spells.
