= Point Clare =

Coordinates: 33°26′24″S 151°19′34″E

- Suburb
- Interactive map of Point Clare
- Country: Australia
- State: New South Wales
- City: Central Coast
- LGA: Central Coast Council
- Location: 4 km (2.5 mi) SW of Gosford; 7 km (4.3 mi) N of Woy Woy; 75 km (47 mi) N of Sydney

Government
  - State electorate: Gosford
  - Federal division: Robertson

Area
  - Total: 3.3 km^{2} (1.3 sq mi)
- Elevation: 10 m (33 ft)

Population
  - Total: 3,731 (2016 census)
  - Density: 1,131/km^{2} (2,930/sq mi)
- Postcode: 2250
- Parish: Patonga
Suburbs around Point Clare
Kariong	West Gosford	Gosford
Kariong	Point Clare	Point Frederick
Brisbane Water National Park	Tascott	Brisbane Water

Point Clare is a suburb of the Central Coast region of New South Wales, Australia located approximately 75 kilometres (47 mi) north of Sydney and 4 kilometres (2 mi) south-west of Gosford's central business district on the western shore of Brisbane Water. It is part of the Central Coast Council local government area.

The suburb contains Point Clare railway station, which is on the Main North railway line, an Aldi supermarket, a pharmacy, a multi-doctor medical practice, a coffee shop, Deli, Chinese and Thai takeaway, a number of real estate agents, massage therapist, accountant and veterinarian. The Point Clare Hall in Talinga Ave is used for a variety of community activities.

In addition, there is a Scouts' and Guides' Hall at Fagans Park. Marine Rescue Central Coast, a volunteer rescue unit and TS Hawkesbury, an Australian Navy Cadet unit, are located at the northern end of Goodaywang Reserve on the Brisbane Water foreshore.

Point Clare Public School is located on Takari Avenue. Henry Kendall High School and Gosford High School (selective) are the nearest public secondary schools. St Philip's Christian College in Narara is the nearest private school, catering from Kindergarten to Year 12.

Author Stephen Lacey grew up in Point Clare at 37 Brisbane Water Drive. The village was the setting for his first two novels, The Tin Moon and Sandstone.

Actor Don Hany also grew up in Point Clare.

The population recorded at the 2016 Census was 3,731; a decrease from the 3,810 recorded in 2011.
