= 2005–06 Australian bushfire season =

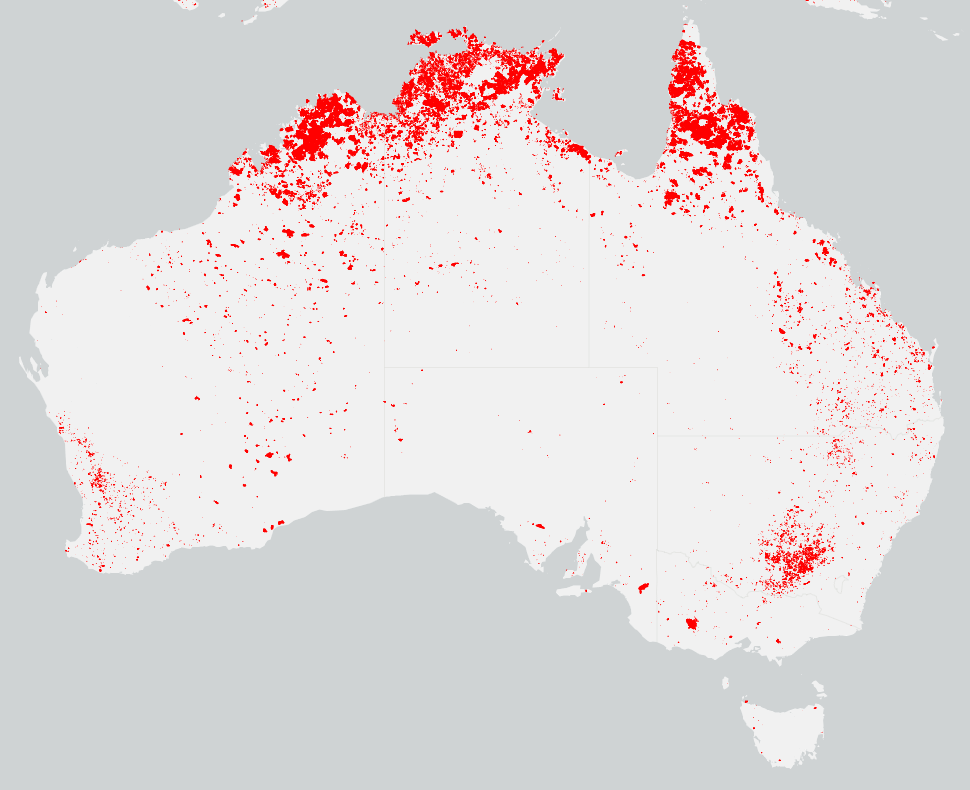
- NASA MODIS burned area detections from June 2005 to May 2006
- Date: Winter (June) 2005 – Autumn (May) 2006
- Location: Australia

Statistics
- Burned area: >180,000 ha (440,000 acres)

Impacts
- Deaths: 5 total: 2 CFA firefighters; 1 St. John Ambulance volunteer; 2 other
- Injuries: Numerous
- Structures destroyed: 500+ total: 75 houses; 400+ non-residential structures

A moderately extensive bushfire season, particularly in western Victoria where fires were most prominent, occurred in mid-late January 2006 as conditions persisted across the state.

== Timeline ==
=== January 2006 ===
Bushfires in Victoria were prominent in mid-late January 2006 as conditions permitted across the state. With the loss of 4 lives and 57 homes. On Australia Day, a CFA volunteer died in the Victorian fires. Arsonists were charged with lighting fires that spread through western Victoria in late January. Two people died in The Grampians when their car was overcome by the Mount Lubra bushfire.

Over the month a total of 500 fires were recorded in Victoria with 359 farm buildings destroyed, stock losses of 64,000 and 1,600 square kilometres (618 sq mi) of private and public land burned out.

== Fires of note ==
State	Start date	Deaths	Injuries	Houses lost	Area (ha)	Local govt.	Impacted communities & destruction	Duration	Ref.
VIC	31 December 2005		2	11	10,000 ha (25,000 acres)	Northern Grampians	Stawell: Vineyards, orchards, flower farms and 68 non-residential structures destroyed; 1,600 head of livestock perish		
NSW	1 January 2006		1	10	25,000 ha (62,000 acres)	Junee	Bethungra, Illabo & Junee: 4 shearing sheds, many other non-residential structures and vehicles destroyed; 21,000 head of livestock perish	2 days	
NSW	1 January 2006	1		3	4,500 ha (11,000 acres)	Gosford	Woy Woy, Umina Beach & Phegans Bay: A St John's Ambulance volunteer suffers a heart attack and perishes; 7 vehicles, 3 non-residential structures and a RFS station destroyed	2 days	
VIC	19 January 2006	2		40	130,000 ha (320,000 acres)	Northern Grampians	Moyston, Pornonal, Dunkeld, Mafeking, Willaura & Halls Gap: Two civilians perish; 73 non-residential structures and several dozen vehicles destroyed; 65,000 head of livestock perish	32 days	
VIC	22 January 2006			5	6,700 ha (17,000 acres)	Greater Geelong	Anakie: A hall, 31 non-residential structures and 13 vehicles destroyed; 1,000 head of livestock perish		
VIC	23 January 2006	1	2			Murrindindi	near Yea: A CFA volunteer perishes; Several non-residential structures destroyed		
VIC	17 February 2006	1				Indigo	Barnawartha: A CFA volunteer perishes		
VIC	13 March 2006			6	3,100 ha (7,700 acres)	Pyrenees	Snake Valley, Scarsdale & Smythesdale: 20 vehicles destroyed	8 days	
