= Tascott =

Coordinates: 33°27′14″S 151°18′50″E

Tascott Central Coast, New South Wales
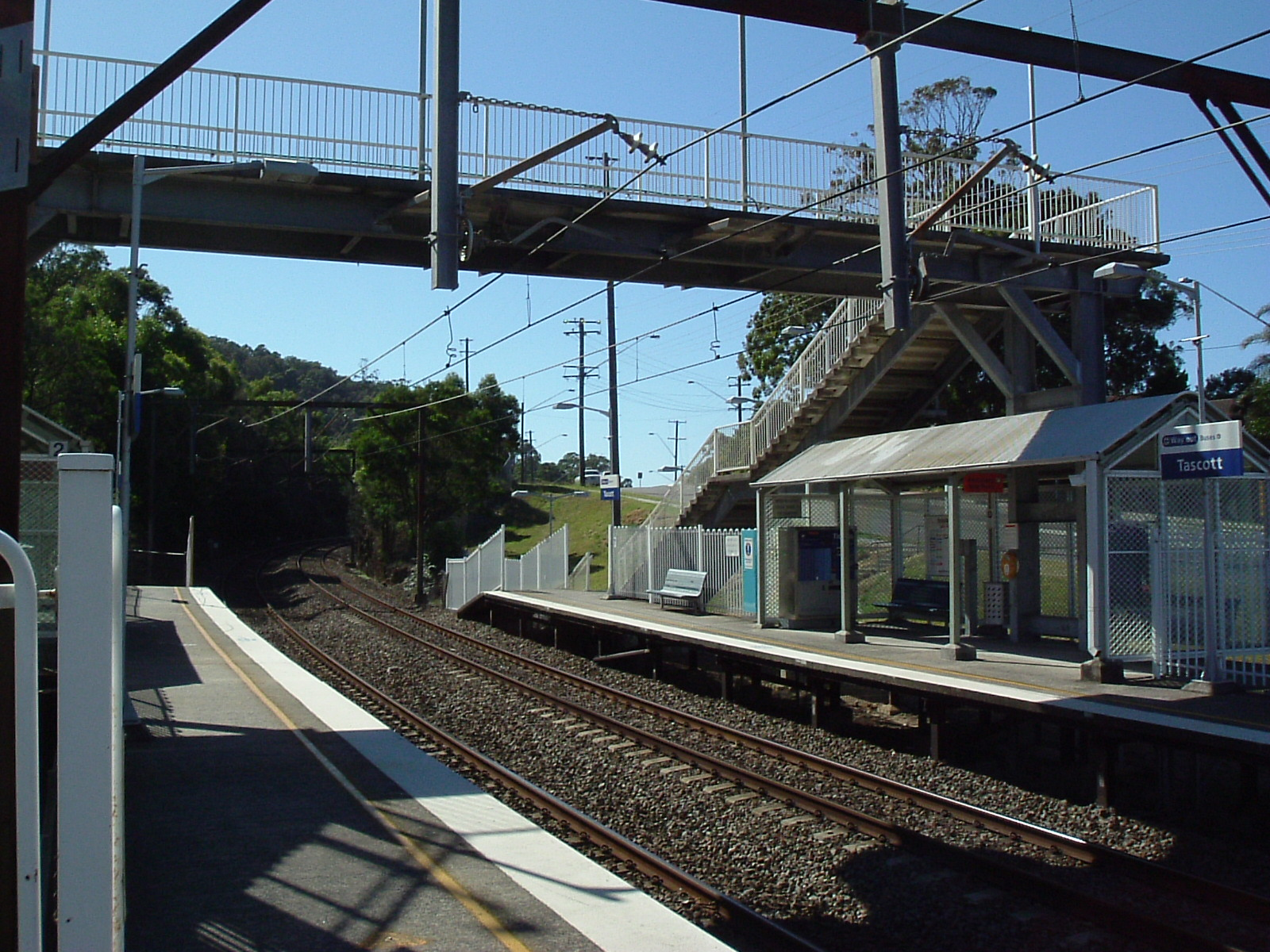
- Population: 1,602 (2016 census)
  - Density: 728/km^{2} (1,890/sq mi)
- Postcode(s): 2250
- Elevation: 5 m (16 ft)
- Area: 2.2 km^{2} (0.8 sq mi)
- Location: 7 km (4 mi) SW of Gosford; 77 km (48 mi) N of Sydney; 5 km (3 mi) N of Woy Woy
- LGA(s): Central Coast Council
- Parish: Patonga
- State electorate(s): Gosford
- Federal division(s): Robertson
Suburbs around Tascott:
Kariong	Point Clare	Point Clare
Kariong	Tascott	Brisbane Water
Brisbane Water National Park	Koolewong	Brisbane Water

Tascott is a suburb of the Central Coast region of New South Wales, Australia between Gosford and Woy Woy on Brisbane Water's western shore. It is part of the Central Coast Council local government area.

== History of Tascott ==
It was founded by Thomas Alison Scott (1777–1881) and his wife Mary Anne Scott, née Crone, (c.1811–1905). The name of the suburb is derived from Scott's name, T.A.Scott.

Scott has been widely regarded as the first person in Australia to grow sugar cane—he is certainly a pioneer of the sugar industry—but the story is more complicated. Sugar cane had been brought from the Cape of Good Hope, with the First Fleet, in 1788, and had been taken to Norfolk Island. The colonial government, in 1804, encouraged settlers to set up a sugar industry on the subtropical island, but it did not eventuate. Captain Francis Allman, superintendent of the newly-established penal settlement at Port Macquarie, gave some sugar cane, to a convict of West Indian origin, James Williams. It was Williams who grew the first sugar cane crop, on the Australian mainland, at Port Macquarie, around 1823. Scott had lived in Antigua, and had previously attempted to establish sugar plantations in Tahiti and Raiatea. It was later stated that he brought sugar cane from Tahiti to Sydney in 1817 and 1819. In 1823, employed by Frederick Goulburn, he moved to Port Macquarie to expand the sugar operations there and at nearby Rolland's Plains, using convict labour. In 1824, he produced sugar and other products from locally-grown cane. Suspended in 1825, he was dismissed in 1828, after a commission of inquiry reported unfavourably on his activities, and the sugar venture was abandoned altogether around 1830. Port Macquarie lies too far south from what is now considered commercially-viable, sugar-growing country, and is sometimes subject to frosts. Commercial sugar production continued there and in the surrounding area, until the winter of 1873 when the last sugar mills closed, due to damage to the cane crop caused by heavy frost.

Scott married the very much younger, Mary Anne Crone from Port Macquarie, in 1827. They moved, in 1829, to what was then all known as Point Clare, on Brisbane Water. By around 1835, Scott had a field of sugar cane growing there, and attempted to set up a model sugar plantation. Scott made sugar there, but only in small amounts that were consumed locally, although 28 pounds of his sugar was reported to have been sent to the Paris Exhibition and awarded a silver medal. He also grew tobacco and bananas. Scott's field of sugar cane, five acres in area, was still there, when it was recorded by a visitor to the area, in 1874.

Scott encouraged the ultimately unsuccessful attempts to grow sugar cane at Kiama. Scott claimed that he had provided plants and instructions to Captain Louis Hope, who began sugar production, at Ormiston House Estate, in 1864, the first commercially-viable production of sugar in Queensland, although Scott's influence on Hope's operation was apparently slight. Scott sought and was granted a government annuity payment, around 1871, in consideration of his efforts to progress the sugar industry. By then, Scott was already an old man. He died at the age of 105 years old, in 1881, and is buried in the cemetery at Point Frederick. His much younger widow remained living on the land on Brisbane Water. The area that Scott cultivated was between where Tascott station is now and Noonan Point, lying within the easternmost part of modern-day Tascott, around where Victory Parade is now. At the western end of this land, stood Scott's residence, and modern-day Waterview Cresent takes its name from this house, later a guesthouse. The landholding was sub-divided, in 1920, and the lots auctioned in early 1921.

Tascott railway station, which is on the Main North railway line, opened in 1905. It was built largely to service the guesthouse, known as 'Waterview', which had been established by Mary Scott. The first use of 'Tascott' was as the station's name. The station once had a particularly dangerous level crossing, between the platform and the curved cutting just to the north. Robert Scott, T.A.Scott's son and heir, was killed there by a train in 1920, and he was not the only fatality crossing the railway. For many years, this level crossing was the only means of road access to the area west of the railway station. The short platform at Tascott was also a cause of mishaps.

The station was rebuilt in 1939, with the new timber deck platform being supported on a framework of old rails, instead of a timber frame. This new design was referred to as a ‘Tascott type’ platform, by railway engineers, and the same arrangement was used, at other stations, over the following 25 years. The station remains a 'short platform' of only two train cars in length.

A private road from Koolewong to Tascott was constructed in the late 1920s but a wooden bridge across the gully later collapsed and was not repaired. Access to both suburbs was greatly improved by the building of the 'waterfront road'—now Brisbane Water Drive—in the late 1930s.

For many years, the suburb was in four distinct parts; the area to the north of the station and west of the line, the area of waterfront adjacent to Point Clare, the area west of the station, and the area around Thomas Street. The dangerous level crossing at the station ceased to be used by cars some time in the 1960s. The level crossing near Thomas Street closed in 1963. Both crossings never had warning signals, just farm-style gates. For many years afterwards, pedestrians continued to cross the line at both these locations—including to access the Up platform at the station or catch the bus on Brisbane Water Drive—before the pedestrian overbridge was built at the station and the level crossing at the station was officially closed in 1984. The extension of Glenrock Parade, from the north of the station through to Koolewong, finally provided safe road access to the entire area of Tascott. Prior to late 1970, the section of the road—now part of Glenrock Parade—that intersected Thomas Street was known as Tascott Parade.

Before World War II, Tascott was a minor holiday destination and, until the 1960s, the suburb was semi-rural. The flat—formerly swampy and partially salt marsh—area to the west of the railway station was a dairy farm, known as Tascott Dairy, which survived into the early 1960s. During this period, Tascott had no sewerage or reticulated water supply. Subdivisions, land sales, and the building of many new houses, led to a rapid growth in the population, during the 1960s and 1970s.

The population of the suburb recorded at the 2016 census was 1,602; a decrease from the 1,706 recorded in 2011.

== Notable residents ==
- Nicola McDermott, 2018 Commonwealth Games bronze medallist and 2020 Summer Olympics silver medallist in high jump
