= Olive Riley =

Australian blogger and YouTuber born in the late 19th century

- Born: 20 October 1899; Broken Hill, New South Wales, Australia
- Died: 12 July 2008 (aged 108); Woy Woy, New South Wales, Australia
- Occupation: Barmaid/various
- Known for: Reputed to be the World's second oldest internet personal blogger (at publication in 2008); Documentary program: All About Olive (broadcast by ABC

Olive Riley (20 October 1899 – 12 July 2008) was an Australian centenarian, who was believed for a time to have been the world's oldest personal internet blogger, and was the subject of a television documentary.

Ruth Hamilton, and American politician and talk show host of Orlando, Florida was later found to be older and also a blogger.

Michael Rubbo, a documentary film maker, started to chronicle the centenarian's life and directed a TV special entitled All About Olive that broadcast on the ABC.

Riley subsequently began an internet blog entitled The Life of Riley (The title of her blog being a name-play on both her surname and the American 1940s radio serial, that was also adapted to television. a film and comic book (The Life of Riley) in February 2007 at the age of 107 and posted over 70 entries,

As well as several video posts on YouTube, in which she discusses both living through World War I and World War II, the years of The Great Depression, raising 3 children, working as a barmaid, her love for drinking shandy and being a fan of the AFL Sydney Swans.

The blog was suggested by Journalist Eric Shackle, a man in his late eighties, who was interested in promoting the idea that one is never too old for the internet.

Riley who was born in Broken Hill, New South Wales could not see well enough to type, so Rubbo set up the blog for her and ran it for next two years with Shackle's assistance, recording her stories, at first on audio and then later on video, to post over 100 YouTube items, all still visible today, as is her archive at mike.mikerubbo.com.

She made her last post two weeks before she died aged 108, at a nursing home in Woy Woy, New South Wales.

== See also ==
- María Amelia López Soliño
- List of centenarians

== Olive Riley Youtube videos ==
- List of Olive Riley's YouTube submissions

== External links and references ==
- "World's oldest blogger makes final post". The Sydney Morning Herald. 15 July 2008.
- "World's oldest blogger Olive Riley of NSW dies". The Courier-Mail. 13 July 2008. Archived from the original on 17 July 2008.
- "Photograph of Olive Riley". news.com.au. 14 July 2008. Archived from the original on 3 August 2008. (In 2007, aged 107, at her nursing home in Woy Woy, New South Wales)
- World's oldest blogger no more
- International Business Times: World's oldest blogger, Olive Riley, dies at 108
