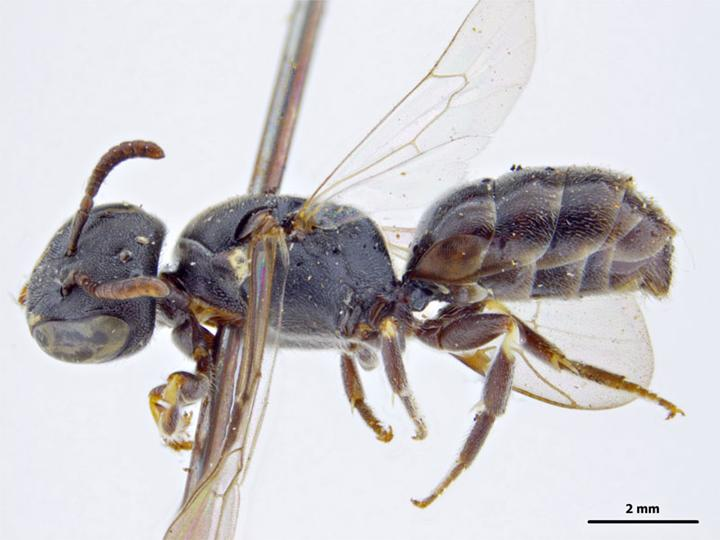
- Female

Scientific classification
- Kingdom: Animalia
- Phylum: Arthropoda
- Clade: Pancrustacea
- Class: Insecta
- Order: Hymenoptera
- Family: Colletidae
- Genus: Hylaeus
- Species: H. woyensis

Binomial name
- Hylaeus woyensis (Rayment, 1939)

= Hylaeus woyensis =

Species of bee

Hylaeus woyensis, or Hylaeus (Prosopisteron) woyensis, is a species of bee in the family Colletidae and subfamily Hylaeinae. It is endemic to Australia. It was described by Australian entomologist Tarlton Rayment in 1939.

== Description ==
Male body length is about 4 mm. Integumental colouration is mainly black, with cream markings.

== Distribution and habitat ==
The species occurs in eastern Australia. The type locality is Woy Woy, on the Central Coast of New South Wales.

== Behaviour ==
The adults are flying mellivores.
