= West Gosford =

West Gosford Central Coast, New South Wales
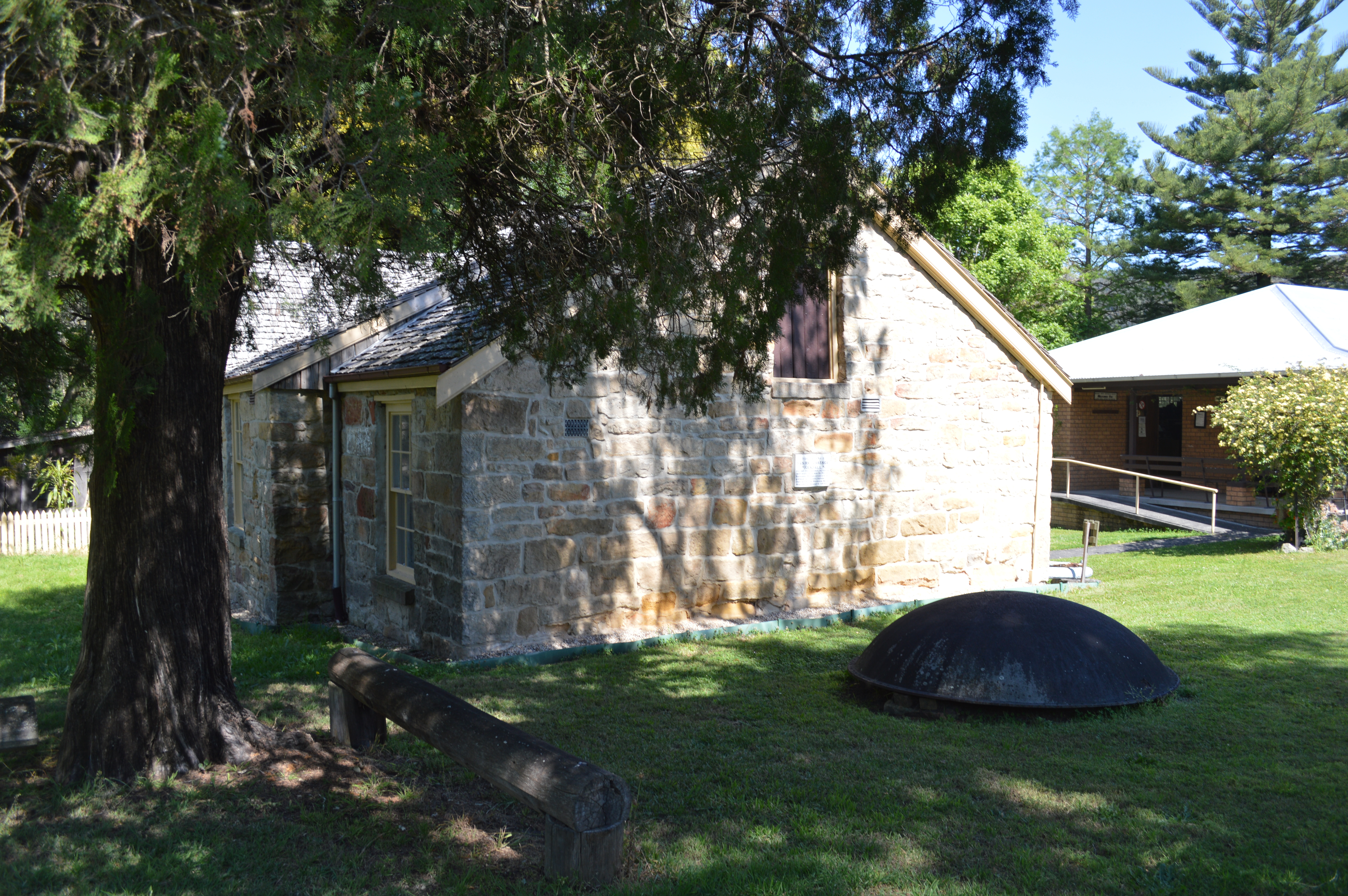
- Henry Kendall Cottage at West Gosford

- Coordinates: 33°24′54″S 151°19′5″E
- Population: 1,335 (2016 census)
  - Density: 342/km^{2} (887/sq mi)
- Postcode(s): 2250
- Elevation: 10 m (33 ft)
- Area: 3.9 km^{2} (1.5 sq mi)
- Location: 2 km (1 mi) W of Gosford; 10 km (6 mi) N of Woy Woy; 74 km (46 mi) N of Sydney; 91 km (57 mi) SSW of Newcastle
- LGA(s): Central Coast Council
- Parish: Gosford
- State electorate(s): Gosford
- Federal division(s): Robertson
Suburbs around West Gosford:
Somersby	Narara	Narara
Kariong	West Gosford	Gosford
Kariong	Point Clare	Gosford

West Gosford is a suburb of the Central Coast region of New South Wales, Australia. It is part of the Central Coast Council local government area. West Gosford is home to the Henry Kendall cottage and was home to the Gosford Classic Car Museum prior to its 2019 closure. While there are some residential areas, West Gosford is known as a retail and industry hub.

== Population ==
In the 2016 Census, there were 1,335 people in West Gosford. 70.8% of people were born in Australia and 82.7% of people spoke only English at home. The most common responses for religion were No Religion 28.6%, Anglican 20.9% and Catholic 20.6%.
