= KMHS =

KMHS may refer to:

== Radio stations ==
- KMHS (AM), a radio station (1420 AM) licensed to Coos Bay, Oregon, US
- KMHS-FM, a radio station (91.3 FM) licensed to Coos Bay, Oregon, US

== High schools ==
- Kariong Mountains High School, Kariong, New South Wales, Australia
- Kasson-Mantorville High School, Kasson, Minnesota, US
- Kellenberg Memorial High School, Uniondale, New York, US
- Kennesaw Mountain High School, Kennesaw, Georgia, US
- Kettle Moraine High School, Wales, Wisconsin, US
- Kings Mountain High School, Kings Mountain, North Carolina, US
