= María Amelia López Soliño =

- Born: 23 December 1911; Corcubión, Galicia, Spain
- Died: 20 May 2009 (aged 97); Pontevedra, Galicia, Spain
- Occupation: Pensioner
- Known for: Blogging, named best Spanish language blog, in 2008 by Deutsche Welle

María Amelia López Soliño (23 December 1911, Corcubión, A Coruña, Galicia, Spain – 20 May 2009, Pontevedra, Galicia, Spain) was the oldest-known woman blogger at the time of her death on 20 May 2009 aged 97, with the blog attracting 1.7 million visiters.

She had been blogging for more than two years. The blog was set up for her as a gift from her grandson, Daniel, to mark her 95th birthday. She received a visit from Spanish Prime Minister José Luis Rodríguez Zapatero and won an award from German broadcaster Deutsche Welle for best Spanish language blog in 2008.

== Early life ==
López Soliño was born 23 December 1911 in the small village of Corcubión on the Costa da Morte. Her father, a customs officer, did not permit her to study. After the Spanish Civil War she married a teacher and raised one son. She helped raise her two grandchildren after the death of her daughter-in-law. She was widowed after husband died following a lengthy illness.

== Blogging ==
She eventually went into a nursing home, but after eight years moved out to live with her grandson near Pontevedra. On her 95th birthday, her grandson set up a blogsite for her to keep her mentally alert and active in her last years. Her blogs included chats, reminiscences, politics and advice, with topics from the Spanish Civil War, the decades of General Francisco Franco's fascist dictatorship to modern politics, including Basque separatism and Iran's nuclear ambitions, to what it was like growing old.

López Soliño had held socialist beliefs since her childhood, but had been forbidden to join any political parties by her father, especially due to the political violence in Spain during the Spanish Civil War, during which (in 1936), her family helped to save the life of the son of a Republican (anti-Fascist) commander; that son later became one of her regular internet contacts. She was forced to dictate her entries to her grandson due to cataracts. Her fame as a blogger led to the visit by the Spanish Prime Minister.

"My grandson gave me this blog when I was 95 on December 23, 2006 and my life changed ... [On] December 23, 2006, my grandson gave me a present, this blog when I was 95 years old ... and my life changed ... now, I can communicate and interact with the world ... [S]ince that day I've had 1,570,784 visits from bloggers from 5 continents who have cheered up my old age ... [W]hen I'm on the Internet, I forget about my illness. The distraction is good for you—being able to communicate with people. It wakes up the brain, and gives you great strength."

In November 2007, her blog won a prize for Best Spanish Language Blog at the BOBS ceremony organised by German broadcaster Deutsche Welle.

== Posthumous ==
Following her death, her family left a final post, thanking readers for their support.

"[There were] 880 days when her blog made her happy ... the support she needed to enjoy her last days of life ... [W]hen somebody leaves after 97 years, living with joy from the beginning to the end, we can't be sad Wherever you are, grandmother, you will read these ... comments, all of them without doubt. She will laugh at some, will learn with others, she might get annoyed at the specific 'language' used in some ... but she will be happy reading all of them."

A banner on her site read "Rest in Peace", with nearly 500 messages mourning her death.

== See also ==
- Ruth Hamilton (1898-2008) American politician and radio talk host, cited as the world's oldest blogger
- Olive Riley (1899-2008) Australian woman, the second oldest blogger worldwide
