= Koolewong =

Coordinates: 33°27′58″S 151°19′05″E

- Suburb
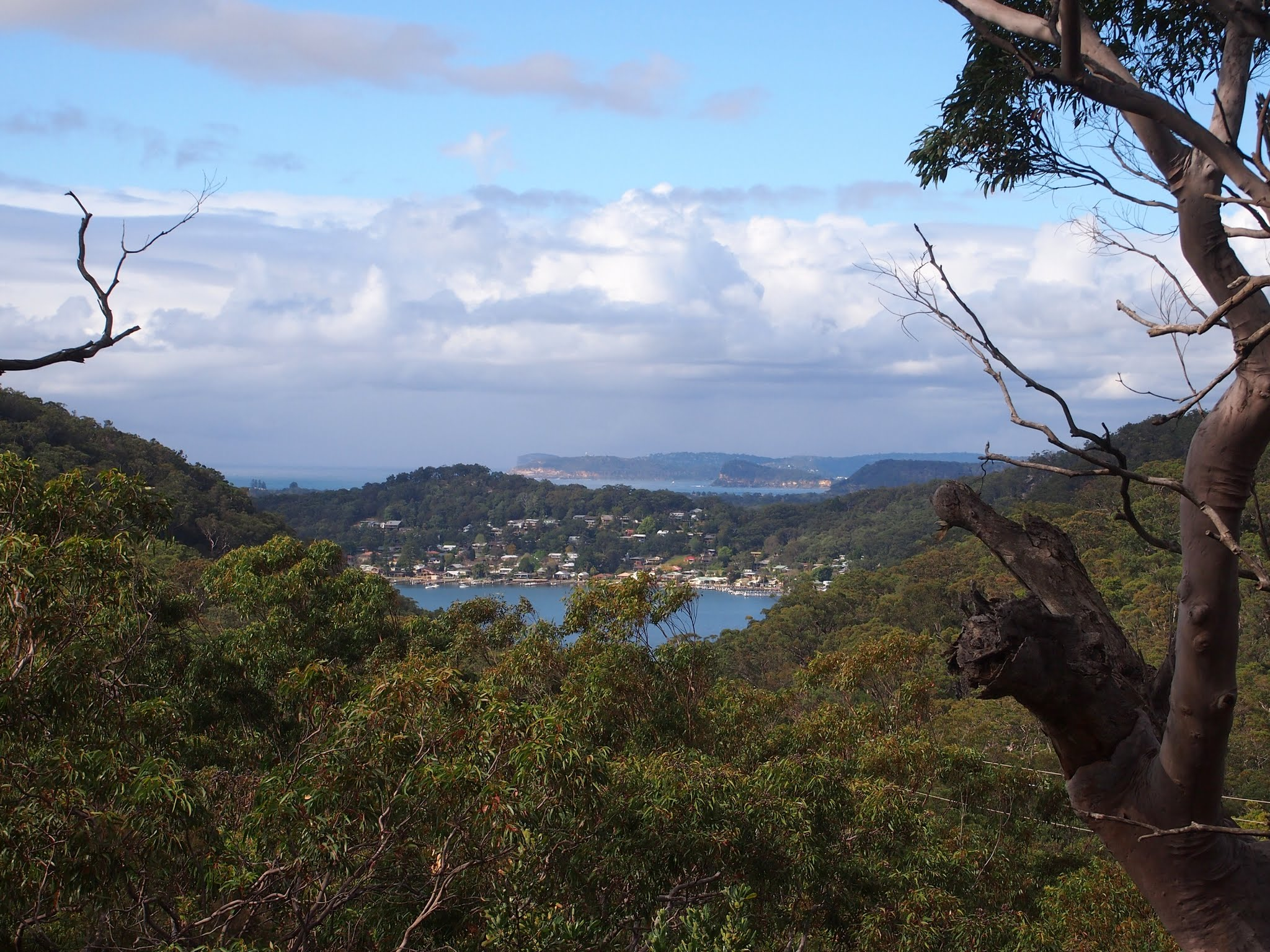
- Koolewong, Central Coast, NSW
- Interactive map of Koolewong
- Country: Australia
- State: New South Wales
- City: Central Coast
- LGA: Central Coast Council
- Location: 9 km (5.6 mi) S of Gosford; 3 km (1.9 mi) N of Woy Woy; 75 km (47 mi) N of Sydney

Government
  - State electorate: Gosford
  - Federal division: Robertson

Area
  - Total: 5 km^{2} (1.9 sq mi)
- Elevation: 9 m (30 ft)

Population
  - Total: 1,020 (2021 census)
  - Density: 204/km^{2} (530/sq mi)
- Postcode: 2256
- Parish: Patonga
Suburbs around Koolewong
	Tascott
Brisbane Water National Park	Koolewong	Brisbane Water
Brisbane Water National Park	Woy Woy Bay	Woy Woy

Koolewong is a suburb of the Central Coast region of New South Wales, Australia between Gosford and Woy Woy, and is mostly on a hill overlooking Brisbane Water. It is part of the Central Coast Council local government area.

The suburb contains Koolewong railway station, which is on the Main North railway line.

The land around Koolewong is flat to the southeast, but to the northwest it is hilly. The highest point in the vicinity has an elevation of 150 metres and is 1.0 km south of Koolewong. The nearest larger town is Umina, 6.5 km south of Koolewong. In the region around Koolewong, coves, bays, and beaches are unusually common.

== History ==
Koolewong is a local Aboriginal word for Koala.

The locality was originally known as “Glenrock”. The name was changed to Koolewong by the New South Wales Railways, and the area subsequently adopted the new name. The railway line through the area opened on 16 January 1888, though the Koolewong railway station itself did not open until much later, on 29 November 1920.

At the 2021 Census, the population of Koolewong was 1020, an increase from the 871 recorded in 2016.

Koolewong Marina, featuring 50 floating berths, is a recent addition to the Central Coast, catering to cruisers, yachts, and catamarans. In January 2021, the Koolewong Flora Reserve was established, covering an area of 1,874 hectares under the Forestry Act 2012 to protect the local environment. The area has also faced significant challenges, including a major fire incident where sixteen homes were destroyed, leading to arson investigations and community fundraisers for affected residents.

== Locations ==
Koolewong has many places to go to such as a small mountain bike trail at the fire trail and Couche park where there is a playground and a jetty where you can go fishing. The fire trail goes all the way up to Kariong and as far as Point Clare. Also nearby are the Gosford Glyphs where many engraved hieroglyphs are.
