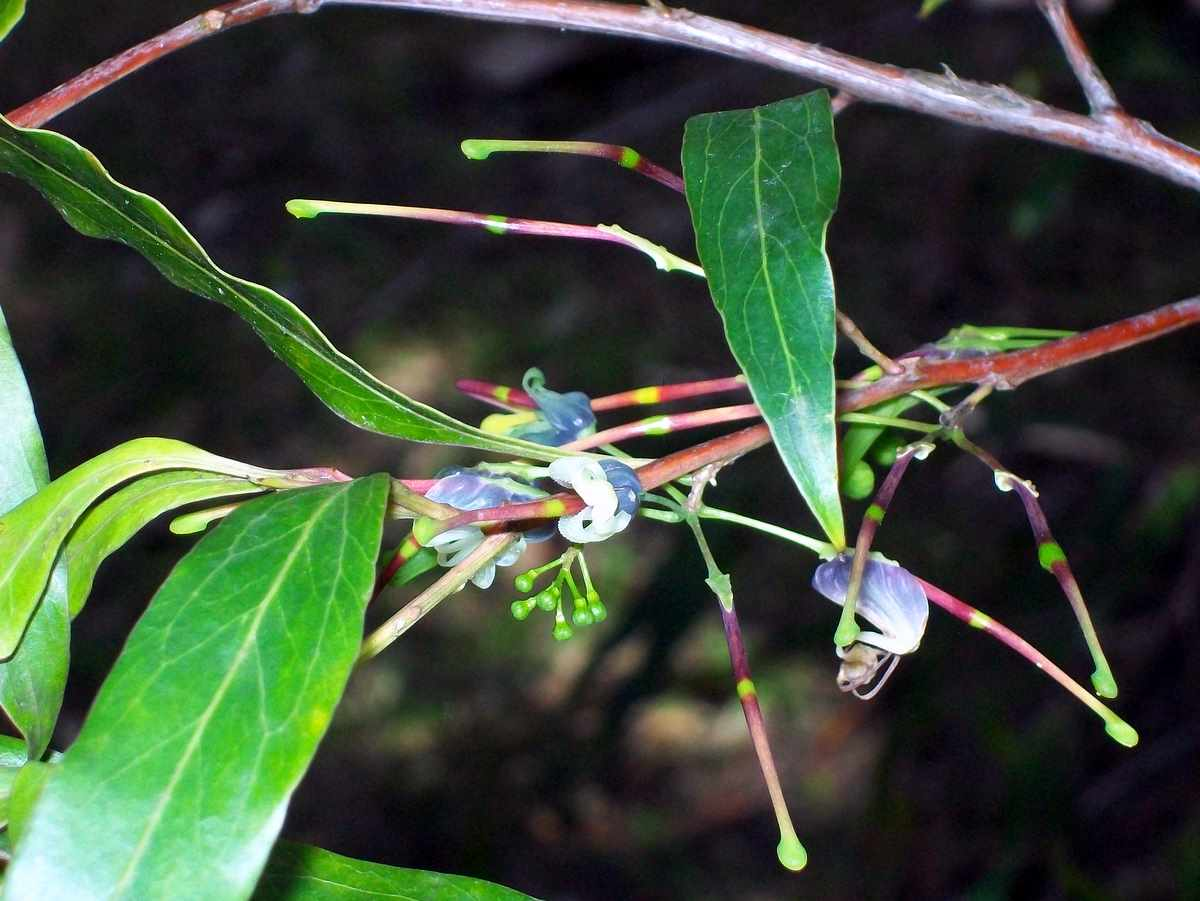
- Near Pearl Beach

Conservation status
- Endangered (IUCN 3.1)

- Vulnerable (EPBC Act)

Scientific classification
- Kingdom: Plantae
- Clade: Tracheophytes
- Clade: Angiosperms
- Clade: Eudicots
- Order: Proteales
- Family: Proteaceae
- Genus: Grevillea
- Species: G. shiressii

Binomial name
- Grevillea shiressii Blakely

= Grevillea shiressii =

Species of shrub endemic to Australia

Grevillea shiressii, also known as Mullet Creek Grevillea is a threatened species of flowering plant in the family Proteaceae and is endemic to New South Wales where it is found in only two localities near Gosford. It is a tall, erect shrub with oblong to narrowly lance-shaped leaves with distinctive intramarginal veins and small clusters of green to bluish-grey, later cream-coloured flowers with a brownish-maroon style.

== Description ==
Grevillea shiressii is an erect, woody shrub that typically grows to a height of 1.5–5 m tall (4 ft 11 in – 16 ft 5 in). Its leaves are oblong to narrowly lance-shaped, mostly 8–19 mm (0.31–0.75 in) long and 13–30 mm (0.51–1.18 in) wide, sometimes with wavy margins. Leaves have a distinctive pattern with conspicuous marginal veins 2–4 mm from the margins.

The flowers are arranged on the ends of branches or in leaf axils, in loose clusters of 2 to 10 on a rachis 1–8 mm (0.039–0.315 in) long, each flower on a pedicel 9–19 mm (0.35–0.75 in) long, the pistil 27–32 mm (1.1–1.3 in) long. The flowers are green in the bud stage, later bluish-grey to mauve, finally cream-coloured, the style brownish maroon. Flowering mainly occurs from July to December, and the fruit is a glabrous, elliptic follicle 14–16 mm (0.55–0.63 in) long.

This grevillea is similar to, but easily distinguishable from the related G. singuliflora, a species from Queensland which grows only 0.5–1.5 m (1 ft 8 in – 4 ft 11 in) tall, has solitary or paired flowers and small, ovate leaves 0.7–3.5 cm (0.28–1.38 in) long and 10–23 mm (0.39–0.91 in) wide.

== Taxonomy ==
Grevillea shiressii was first formally described in 1925 by William Blakely in the Proceedings of the Linnean Society of New South Wales. The specific epithet (shiressii) honours David William Campbell Shiress, Blakely's "friend and companion on many botanical excursions".

== Distribution and habitat ==
This grevillea grows on alluvial sandy soils in forests along creek banks, under such trees as mountain blue gum (Eucalyptus deanei), turpentine (Syncarpia glomulifera) and rough-barked apple (Angophora floribunda), and alongside watergum (Tristaniopsis laurina) and river lomatia (Lomatia myricoides). It is only found growing naturally along two tributaries of the lower Hawkesbury River near Gosford north of Sydney, Mullet Creek near Wondabyne and Mooney Mooney Creek.

== Ecology ==
Birds forage among and pollinate the flowers of G. shiressii, while ants disperse the seeds. Wasps of the genus Eurytoma prey on the seeds. Plants are killed by fire and regenerate from seed.

== Conservation status ==
Grevillea shiressii is listed as endangered on the IUCN Red List of Threatened Species and as vulnerable under the Australian Government Environment Protection and Biodiversity Conservation Act 1999 and the New South Wales Government Biodiversity Conservation Act 2016 (NSW). The main threats to the species include its restricted distribution, track maintenance, inappropriate fire regimes, and weed invasion.

== Use in horticulture ==
Grevillea shiressii is grown as an ornamental plant, both for its foliage and unusual flowers among grevilleas. It is a bird-attracting plant which tolerates a wide variety of climatic conditions. It can tolerate frost but not drought and must be frequently watered. Cultivated plants usually grow into rounded, spreading shrubs up to 3 m by 3 m (9.8 ft).

It is usually propagated from seed, but can be also be grown from cuttings. Seedlings can often be found germinating underneath parent plants.

=== Hybrids ===
A cultivar known as G. 'Ruby Clusters' or G. 'Splendour' is a hybrid between G. shiressii and either G. oleoides or G. victoriae, with the red flowers of these species and the foliage of the former.
