= Phegans Bay =

Coordinates: 33°29′17″S 151°18′36″E

- Suburb
- Interactive map of Phegans Bay
- Country: Australia
- State: New South Wales
- City: Central Coast
- LGA: Central Coast Council
- Location: 15 km (9.3 mi) SSW of Gosford; 6 km (3.7 mi) WNW of Woy Woy; 78 km (48 mi) N of Sydney

Government
  - State electorate: Gosford
  - Federal division: Robertson
- Elevation: 26 m (85 ft)

Population
  - Total: 439 (2011 census)
- Postcode: 2256
- Parish: Patonga
Suburbs around Phegans Bay
| Brisbane Water National Park | Brisbane Water National Park | Woy Woy Bay |
| Brisbane Water National Park | Phegans Bay | Woy Woy |
| Horsfield Bay | Woy Woy | Woy Woy |

Phegans Bay (/fiːɡənz beɪ/) is a suburb within the local government area of the Central Coast Council on the Central Coast of New South Wales, Australia.

Phegans Bay is located 6 kilometres (4 mi) west of Woy Woy between Brisbane Water National Park and Woy Woy Inlet.
