= Kariong =

- Suburb
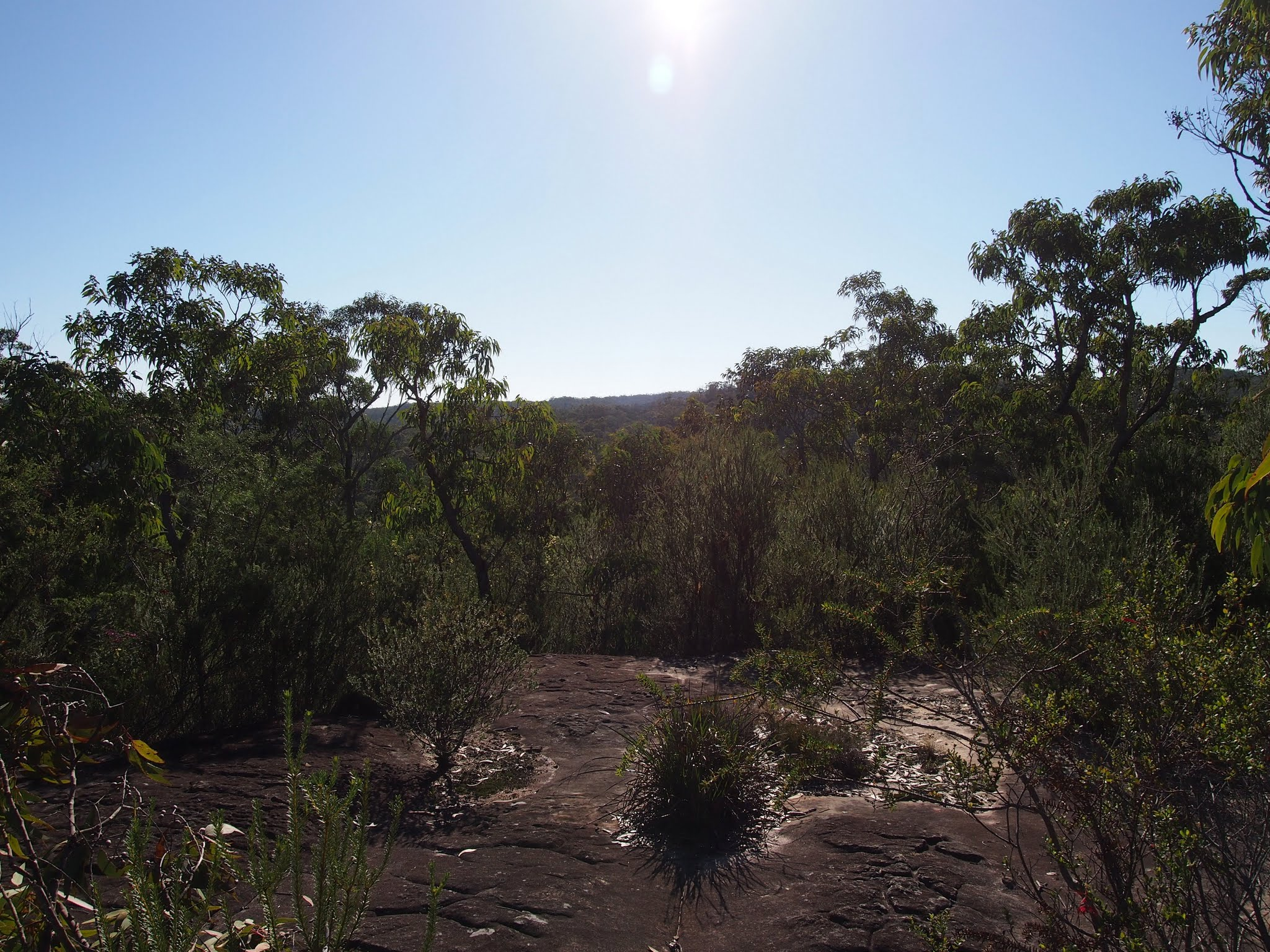

- Interactive map of Kariong
- Coordinates: 33°26′24″S 151°18′04″E
- Country: Australia
- State: New South Wales
- City: Central Coast
- LGA: Central Coast Council
- Location: 7 km (4.3 mi) WSW of Gosford; 70 km (43 mi) N of Sydney; 13 km (8.1 mi) N of Woy Woy

Government
  - State electorate: Gosford
  - Federal division: Robertson
- Elevation: 192 m (630 ft)

Population
  - Total: 6,485 (2021 census)
- Postcode: 2250
- Parish: Patonga
Suburbs around Kariong
Peats Ridge	Somersby	West Gosford
Calga	Kariong	Point Clare
Mooney Mooney Creek	Brisbane Water National Park	Tascott

Kariong (/kærɪɒŋ/) is a locality of the Central Coast region of New South Wales, Australia west of Gosford along the Central Coast Highway. It is part of the Central Coast Council local government area.

== History ==
Kariong's first British settler was W.H. Parry in 1901. The Mt Penang Training School for Boys (later the Mount Penang Juvenile Justice Centre) was opened in 1911. Many of the boys came from the training ship Sobraon, which had been in Sydney Harbour before being condemned, as did former officer Basil Topple. The village of about fifteen families, mostly workers at the training school, was first called Kendall Heights, then Penang Mountain. The name Kariong was assigned in about 1947.

Kariong Mountains High School opened in 2010 at Kariong.

=== Etymology ===
According to the Geographical Names Board, Kariong means "meeting place" in the local Aboriginal language.

== Geography ==
Kariong's boundaries include a considerable section of the Brisbane Water National Park to the south, and the Mount Penang Parklands, with its native gardens. Kariong is considered the entry point to the Central Coast as it borders the Pacific Motorway M1. A visitor information centre for the Central Coast was once located just off the Central Coast Highway, near the entry to the Mount Penang Parklands but no longer exists.

== Population ==
At the 2021 census, the population of Kariong was 6,485.

- Aboriginal and Torres Strait Islander people made up 4.2% of the population.
- 78.8% of people were born in Australia. The next most common countries of birth were England 4.4% and New Zealand 2.0%.
- 86.0% of people spoke only English at home.
- The most common responses for religion were No Religion 42.2%, Catholic 20.5% and Anglican 14.6%.

== Culture ==
The NAISDA Dance College, a performing arts training college for Aboriginal and Torres Strait Islander people from all over Australia, is based in the Mount Penang Parklands in Kariong.

== Gosford glyphs ==
The Gosford Glyphs, a group of around 300 carvings which appear similar to Egyptian hieroglyphs carved into two parallel sandstone walls, are located in the area. They were first reported in 1975 by Alan Dash, a local surveyor who had been visiting the area for seven years. These are now generally dismissed as a hoax.

== Transport ==
There are regular buses from Gosford to Kariong. The main bus routes that connect Gosford and Kariong are routes 33 and 34, operated by Busways.
