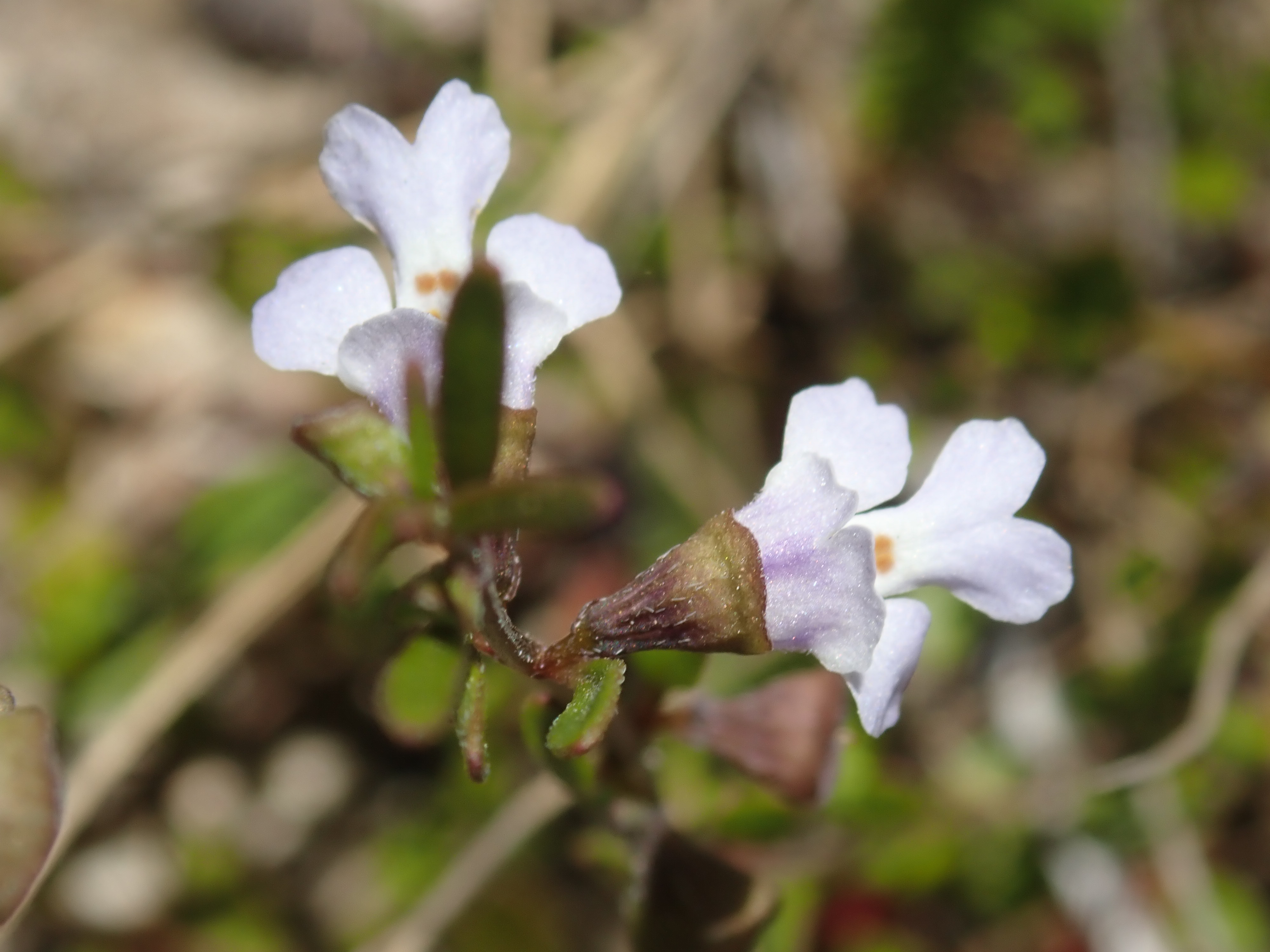

Conservation status
- Endangered (EPBC Act)

Scientific classification
- Kingdom: Plantae
- Clade: Tracheophytes
- Clade: Angiosperms
- Clade: Eudicots
- Clade: Asterids
- Order: Lamiales
- Family: Lamiaceae
- Genus: Prostanthera
- Species: P. junonis

Binomial name
- Prostanthera junonis B.J.Conn
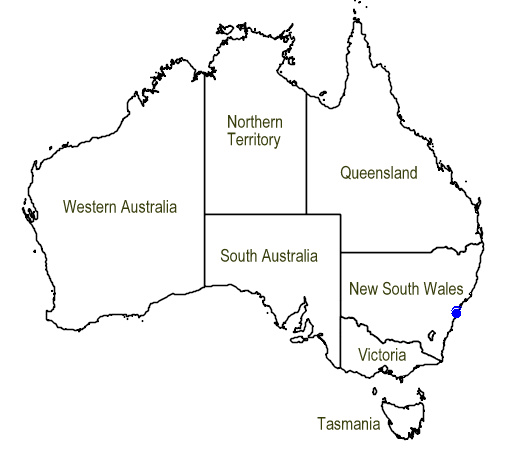

= Prostanthera junonis =

Somersby mintbush

Species of flowering plant

Prostanthera junonis, commonly known as Somersby mintbush, is a species of flowering plant in the family Lamiaceae and is endemic to the Central Coast of New South Wales. It is a low, straggling shrub with hairy, egg-shaped leaves and purple to mauve flowers.

== Description ==
Prostanthera junonis is a low, straggling, almost prostrate shrub that typically grows to a height of 0.1–0.3 m (3.9 in – 11.8 in), is not aromatic, and has branches covered with long hairs. The leaves are dull green above, paler below, narrow egg-shaped to narrow elliptical, often appearing triangular to linear when the edges are turned downwards, 4–14 mm (0.16–0.55 in) long and 3–6 mm (0.12–0.24 in) wide on a petiole about 0.5 mm (0.020 in) long. The flowers are arranged in groups of four to fourteen upper leaf axils on the branchlets on a pedicel 1.5–2.5 mm (0.059–0.098 in) long. The sepals are green with a maroon tinge, 5.5–6 mm (0.22–0.24 in) long, forming a tube 1.5–2 mm (0.059–0.079 in) long with two lobes 1.5–1.8 mm (0.059–0.071 in) long. The sepals are usually slightly hairy and enlarge slightly by the fruiting stage. The petals are pale purple to mauve or almost white and 7–12 mm (0.28–0.47 in) long with two lips. The central lobe of the lower lip is spatula-shaped, 4.5–6 mm (0.18–0.24 in) long and 4–5.5 mm (0.16–0.22 in) wide and the side lobes are 4–5 mm (0.16–0.20 in) long and 3–3.5 mm (0.12–0.14 in) wide. The upper lip is 2–2.5 mm (0.079–0.098 in) long and 6–7 mm (0.24–0.28 in) wide with two lobes. Flowering mainly occurs from October to February.

== Taxonomy ==
Prostanthera junonis was first formally described in 1997 by Barry Conn in the journal Telopea from material collected near Somersby in 1993. The Binomial nomenclature (junonis) honours Mrs June Gay.

== Distribution and habitat ==
Somersby mintbush grows in sclerophyll forest and woodland in sandy loamy soils on sandstone, in the Mangrove Mountain and Sydney districts on the Central Coast of New South Wales.

== Conservation status ==
This mintbush is classified as "endangered" under the Australian Government Environment Protection and Biodiversity Conservation Act 1999 and the New South Wales Government Biodiversity Conservation Act 2016 and a recovery plant has been prepared. The main threats to the species include habitat loss and degradation due to agriculture, hazard reduction burns, weed invasion, and stormwater runoff.
