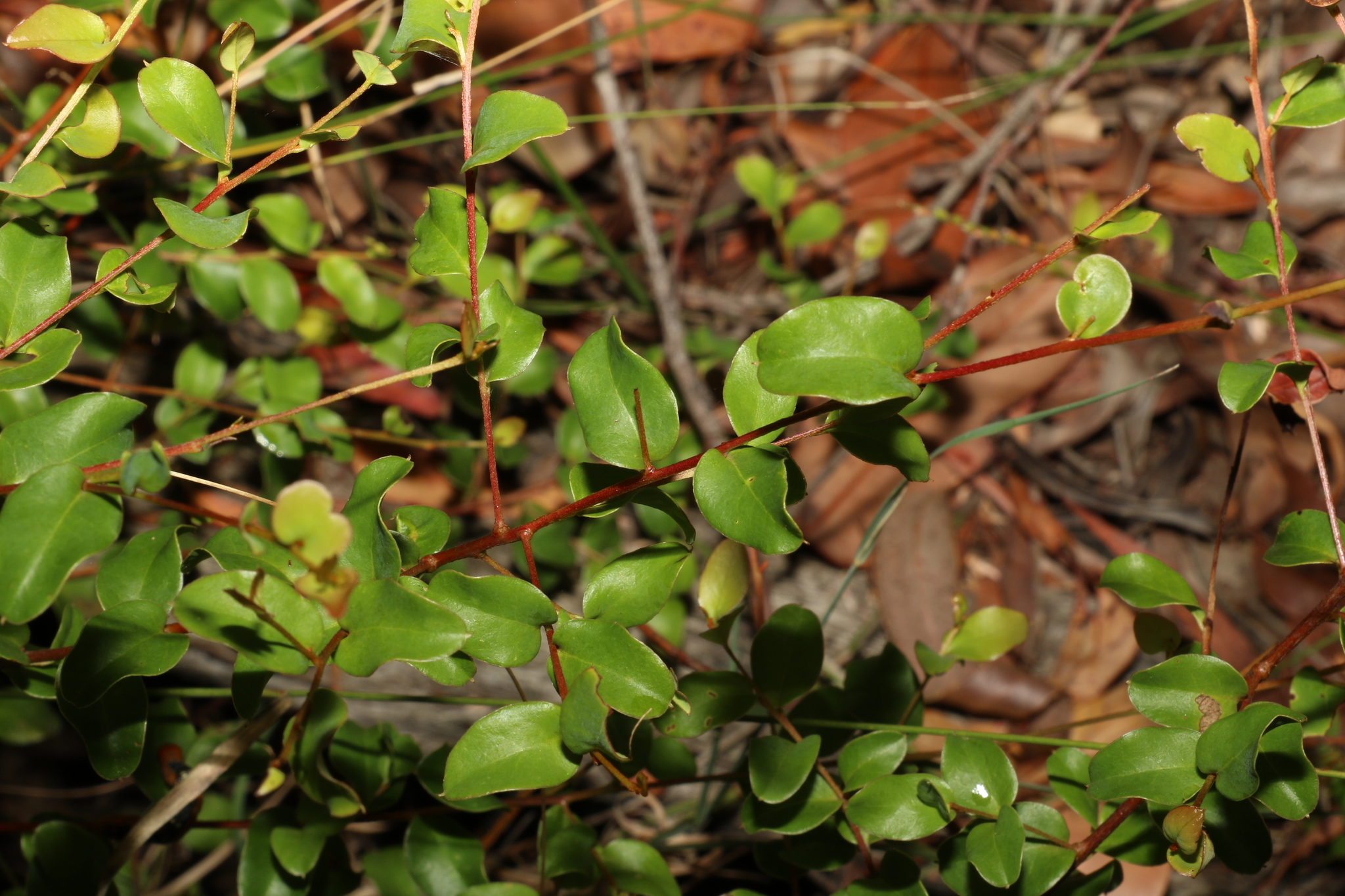
- Foliage

Scientific classification
- Kingdom: Plantae
- Clade: Tracheophytes
- Clade: Angiosperms
- Clade: Eudicots
- Order: Proteales
- Family: Proteaceae
- Genus: Grevillea
- Species: G. singuliflora

Binomial name
- Grevillea singuliflora F.Muell

= Grevillea singuliflora =

Species of plant endemic to Queensland, Australia

Grevillea singuliflora is a species of flowering plant in the family Proteaceae and is endemic to southeast Queensland. It is a sprawling or spreading shrub with oblong to egg-shaped or almost round leaves and green or cream-coloured flowers with a maroon style, arranged singly or in pairs on the ends of branches.

== Description ==
Grevillea singuliflora is a sprawling to spreading shrub that typically grows to a height of 0.2–1 m (7.9 in – 3 ft 3.4 in). Its leaves are 10–20 mm (0.39–0.79 in) long, 10–16 mm (0.39–0.63 in) wide with wavy edges. The flowers are arranged singly or in pairs on the ends of branches on a rachis 1–3 mm (0.039–0.118 in) long, the pistil 23–24 mm (0.91–0.94 in) long. The flowers are green or cream-coloured, the style moroon with a green tip. Flowering mainly occurs from March to September and the fruit is a glabrous follicle 13–15 mm (0.51–0.59 in) long.

== Taxonomy ==
Grevillea singuliflora was first formally described in 1867 by Ferdinand von Mueller in Fragmenta Phytographiae Australiae from specimens collected by Ludwig Leichhardt near Dogwood Creek. The specific epithet (singuliflora) means "single-flowered".

== Distribution and habitat ==
The grevillea occurs in scattered populations from Helidon to the Blackdown Tableland in southeast Queensland. It grows on sandy soils, usually close to watercourses, in open dry eucalypt forest.

== Conservation status ==
Grevillea singuliflora is listed as of "least concern" under the Queensland Government Nature Conservation Act 1992.
