= Kariong Mountains High School =

Location
- 10 Festival Dr, Mount Penang Parklands, Kariong, Central Coast, New South Wales; Australia
- Coordinates: 33°25′48″S 151°17′45″E

Information
- Type: Government-funded co-educational comprehensive secondary day school
- Motto: To challenge students to reach their full potential, having the skills necessary to be respected and successful citizens in an ever-changing society.
- Established: 22 February 2010; 16 years ago
- School district: Central Coast; Regional North
- Educational authority: New South Wales Department of Education
- Principal: Donna James
- Staff: ~65
- Teaching staff: 45.9 FTE (2018)
- Years: 7–12
- Enrolment: 540 (2018)
- Campus type: Suburban
- Slogan: Unity, Knowledge, Respect
- Team name: KMHS Wolves
- Website: kariongmtn-h.schools.nsw.gov.au

Kariong Mountains High School is a government-funded co-educational comprehensive secondary day school, located in Kariong, a suburb of Gosford, in the Central Coast region of New South Wales, Australia.

Established on 22 February 2010 for students in Year 7 and Year 8 only, the school enrolled 540 students in 2018, from Year 7 to Year 12, of whom five percent identified as Indigenous Australians and ten percent were from a language background other than English. The school is operated by the NSW Department of Education; the principal is Anne Vine.

== History ==
Most of the Parklands, including the Kariong Mountains High School site, are listed on the New South Wales State Heritage Register.

== Notable students ==
- Dylan Littlehales – paracanoeist competed in the 2016 Rio Paralympics

== See also ==
- List of government schools in New South Wales: G–P
- Education in Australia
