= Ruth Hamilton =

American politician (1898–2008)

New Hampshire State Legislature
- In office 1964–1973

Personal details
- Born: Ruth Jensen; April 21, 1898 Alta, Iowa, U.S.
- Died: January 18, 2008 (aged 109) Orlando, Florida, U.S.
- Party: Republican
- Spouse: Carter Hamilton
- Occupation: Politician, Talk show host

Ruth Hamilton (née Jensen) (April 21, 1898 – January 18, 2008) was an American politician and centenarian. Hamilton served in the New Hampshire House of Representatives from 1964 to 1973 and was one of the first female talk radio show hosts in the country.

== Biography ==
Hamilton was born in Alta, Iowa, to Peter and Hulda Jensen on April 21, 1898. At a Fourth of July sandlot baseball game in 1920, she met Carter Hamilton. After he was drafted to play professional baseball for the Cleveland Indians, the two got married a year later. Together they had an adopted son named Peter. Carter Hamilton died in 1949, and Ruth never remarried. She died aged 109, on January 18, 2008, in Orlando, Florida.

== Political career ==
First being elected in 1964, Hamilton was the first woman elected to the New Hampshire state legislature; a position she remained in until 1973. She was instrumental in passing laws that shut down orphanages and made littering a crime in that state.

She was one of America's first female radio talk-show hosts.

Hamilton was a world traveler well into her 90s and lectured all across the country. She became a member of Growing Bolder, a social networking service, while living in a Florida assisted living community.
