= Woy Woy =

- Town
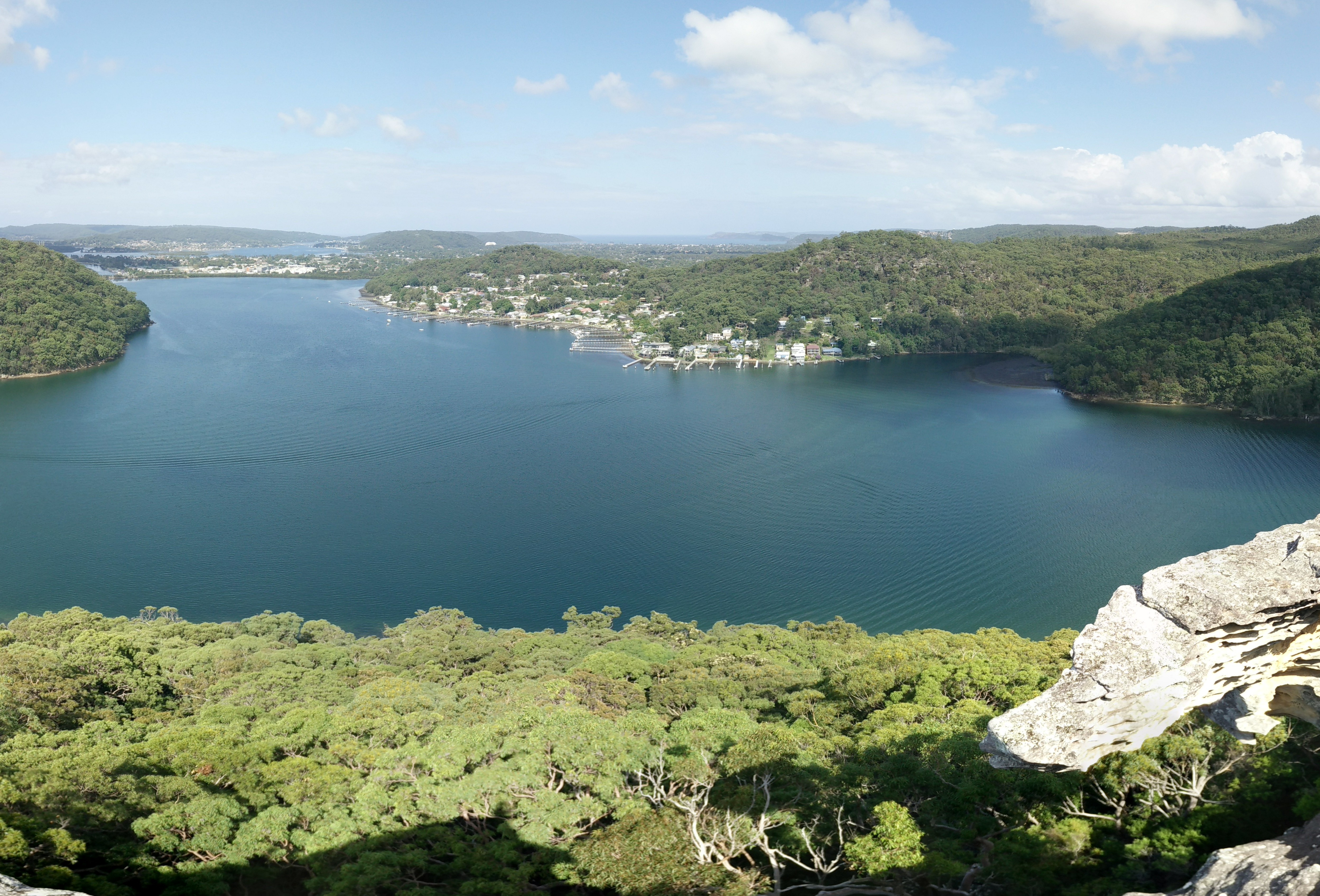
- View of Woy Woy and Brisbane Water from Spion Kop

- Coordinates: 33.49°S 151.32°E
- Country: Australia
- State: New South Wales
- City: Central Coast
- LGA: Central Coast Council
- Location: 84 km (52 mi) NNE of Sydney; 12 km (7.5 mi) S of Gosford

Government
  - State electorate: Gosford
  - Federal division: Robertson

Area
  - Total: 6.0 km^{2} (2.3 sq mi)
- Elevation: 4 m (13 ft)

Population
  - Total: 11,072 (SAL 2021)
- Postcode: 2256
- Parish: Patonga
Localities around Woy Woy
Phegans Bay	Koolewong	Saratoga
Horsfield Bay	Woy Woy	St Huberts Island
Brisbane Water National Park	Umina Beach	Blackwall

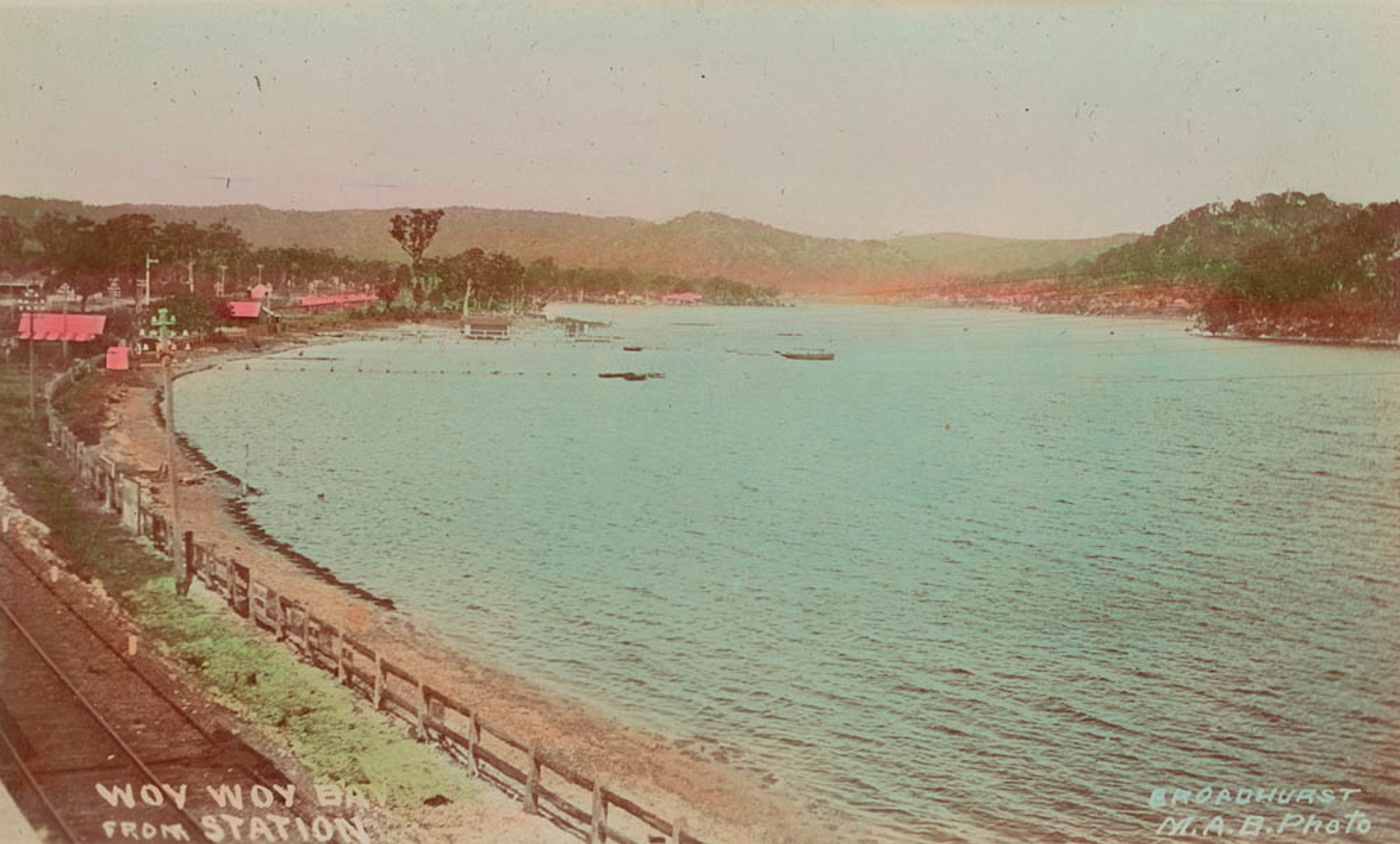
Woy Woy Bay in the early 1900s

Woy Woy is a coastal town in the Central Coast region of the New South Wales state of Australia. The town is located on the southern reaches of Brisbane Water and near the mouth of Brisbane Water at the Pacific Ocean, it is a popular holiday destination. Woy Woy is located 84 km (52 mi) north of the state capital Sydney. It is a population centre within the Central Coast Council local government area.

Woy Woy is located in the northern half of the Woy Woy Peninsula, a densely populated estuarine peninsula that also includes the districts of Umina Beach, Ettalong Beach, Booker Bay and Blackwall, in addition to several small sub-districts. The Woy Woy Peninsula is the most populous area of the Central Coast. The historical and commercial core of Woy Woy is located around the railway station at the northern tip of the peninsula while its residential districts merge imperceptibly southwards with Umina and Ettalong. (Woy Woy officially ends at Veron Road and Gallipoli Avenue; and Umina begins beyond this).

== History ==
=== Origin of name ===
The double name is a corruption of the indigenous term apparently taken from the local Darkinjung Aboriginal people, and reputedly means 'big lagoon' or 'much water', referring to the deep tidal channel adjacent to the town centre. It was originally known as Webb's Flat, named for James Webb, the first European settler of the Brisbane Water region in 1823, and was first explored by a party led by Governor Arthur Phillip in 1789.

=== Small coastal settlement ===
In December 1948, there were private enterprise plans announced to develop 1259 acres of light industrial land, 800 acres of accompanying housing, a railway connection with the existing main line and the conversion of the World War II era airstrip at Ettalong Beach into an airport. If the concept had proceeded all costs would have been covered by the developer, including water, sewerage and other amenities. At the time it was predicted that up to 50,000 jobs would have been developed within 10 to 25 years.

After their emigration to Australia, Woy Woy became the hometown of the parents of comedian Spike Milligan, who in turn became a frequent visitor to the town and at one point described it as the "world's only above-ground cemetery".

== Heritage listings ==
Woy Woy has a number of heritage-listed sites, including:

- Woy Woy Road: Woy Woy Tunnel

== Demographics ==
Historical population
Year	Pop.	±%
2001	9,891	—
2006	9,985	+1.0%
2011	10,114	+1.3%
2016	10,643	+5.2%
2021	11,072	+4.0%

According to the 2021 census, there were 11,072 people in Woy Woy.

- Aboriginal and Torres Strait Islander people made up 5.5% of the population.
- 75.0% of people were born in Australia. The next most common countries of birth were England 4.9%, New Zealand 2.0% and China 1.6%.
- 85.1% of people spoke only English at home. Other languages spoken at home included Mandarin at 1.5%.
- The most common responses for religion were No Religion 39.9%, Catholic 21.5% and Anglican 17.0%.

== Schools ==
Woy Woy has one Catholic school, St John the Baptist Primary School, located in Dulkara Road, Woy Woy. Schooling offered by the Sisters of St. Joseph commenced in Woy Woy in 1922 at the original St John the Baptist Church (Parish hall since 2007) located on the corner of Blackwall and Victoria Roads, Woy Woy. There are also two public primary schools, Woy Woy South and Woy Woy, with the senior campus of Brisbane Water Secondary College also located within Woy Woy.

== Business ==
Woy Woy comprises 34,000 square metres of commercially zoned land of which 60% consists of retail businesses together with a mix of professional services and major supermarkets including Deepwater Plaza and Peninsula Plaza. Woy Woy represents the commercial heart of the Peninsula and vital commuter transport hub. The town centre is enhanced by the Woy Woy waterfront precinct and Woy Woy Channel with ferry links to Davistown and Empire Bay.

The Woy Woy commercial centre is represented by the Peninsula Chamber of Commerce which is an affiliated member of the NSW Business Chamber. Woy Woy is recognised as the commercial hub of the Peninsula accommodating numerous legal practices, medical centres, banks and professionals. It is largely focused around the Woy Woy Rail Station (major transport hub) and bus interchange with a heavy retail concentration at Deepwater Plaza shopping centre on western edge of the commercial centre and Peninsula Plaza adjacent to the heritage listed Woy Woy Library. Small cafés and restaurants have clustered along the Woy Woy waterfront adjacent to the heritage listed Bayview Hotel and Woy Woy Hotel on Brickwharf Road. The traditional main street (Blackwall Road) has struggled in recent years from pressure from the major shopping centres and the resurgence of the thriving Umina Beach town centre.

== Culture ==
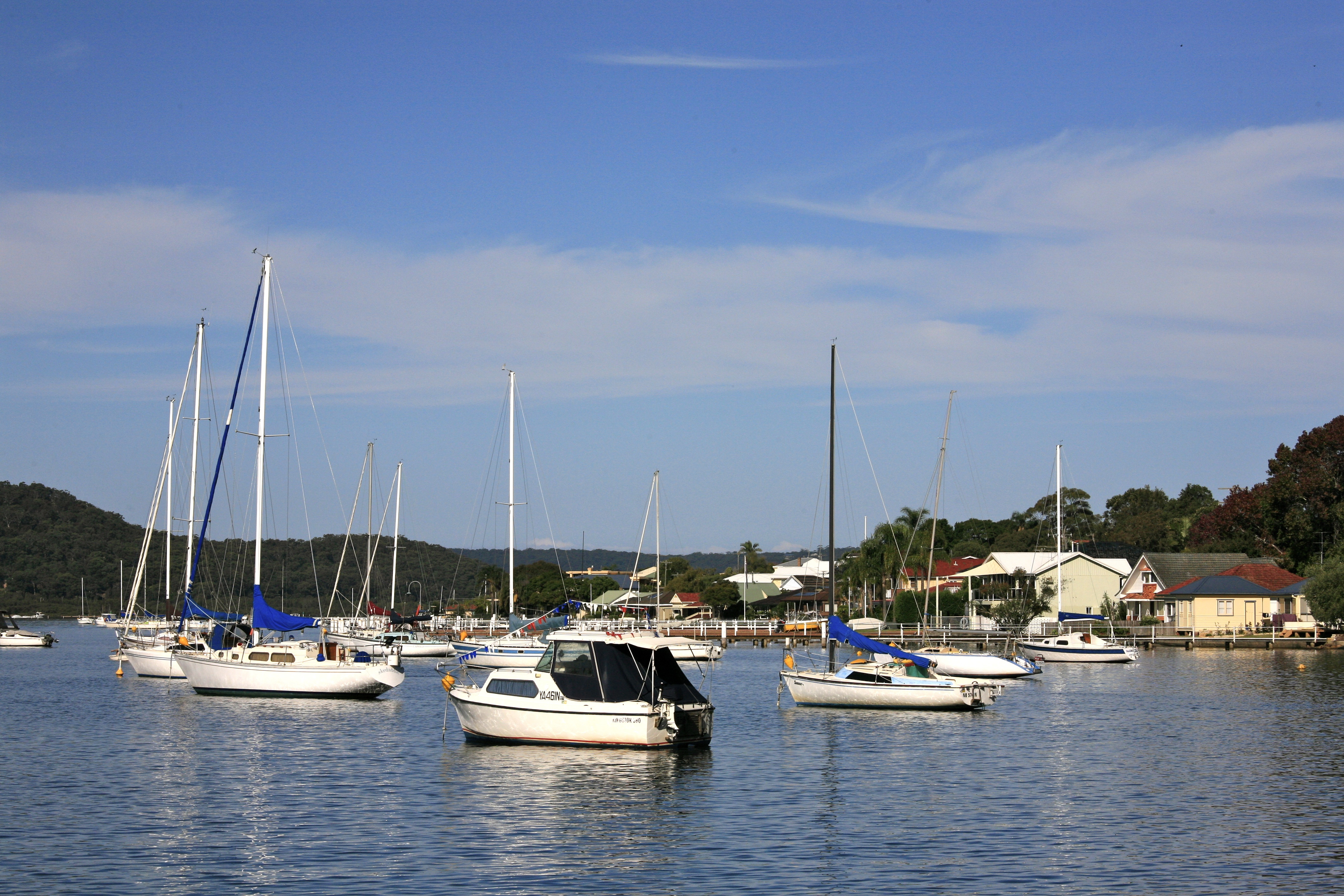
The Woy Woy waterfront

An annual Brisbane Water Oyster Festival is held on the first Sunday in November at Ettalong Beach after being relocated from the Woy Woy waterfront in 2005 due to space restrictions. The event outgrew the location with over 20,000 people attending annually. The "Brisbane Water" Oyster Festival was inaugurated in 2000 and is organised by the Peninsula Chamber of Commerce.

The Woy Woy Little Theatre Company perform four plays every year at The Peninsula Theatre, the sister theatre to Laycock Street Theatre in Gosford. Performances are generally based on strict plays rather than devised or improvised theatre forms and have been doing so since 1962.

After their retirement, the parents and younger brother of comedian Spike Milligan (1918–2002) moved to Woy Woy; as a result, Spike spent some time in the town and was occasionally jocularly referred to as "the boy from Woy Woy". Woy Woy was the home to the now defunct festival known as "Spike Fest", which celebrated Milligan's life and works. Milligan famously named Woy Woy "the largest above ground cemetery in the world" when visiting in the 1960s. He made numerous references to Woy Woy in the radio series The Idiot Weekly.

In July 2007, a new cycle bridge near Woy Woy was named the "Spike Milligan Bridge".

Another internationally known resident of Woy Woy was Olive Riley (1899–2008), of the Woy Woy Community Nursing Home, who became recognised as the world's oldest known blogger. From February 2007, aged 107, she started an internet blog and also appeared in a number of YouTube videos. Her last post was made on 26 June 2008, two and a half weeks prior to her death on 12 July, aged 108.

== Notable residents ==
- Megan Anderson (born 1974), International Netball player, grew up in Woy Woy.
- Graham Eadie (born 1953), Australian Rugby League and Manly Warringah Sea Eagles player.
- Minard Fannie Crommelin (1881–1972), postmistress and environmental conservationist, spent 5 years as postmistress in Woy Woy.
- Karise Eden, winner of the first season of TV singing competition The Voice.
- Ray Hall (born 1980), former Australian rules football player.
- Peter Louis (born 1945), rugby league player and coach.
- Spike Milligan (Terence Alan Milligan 1918–2002), Indian-Irish comedian, writer and actor lived in Woy Woy with his parents for periods of time in the 1960s.
- John Monie (born 1946), Rugby League coach and player grew up in Woy Woy.
- Mark Gregory Pegg (born 1963), world-renowned medieval historian and author, now based in US.
- Janice Petersen (born 1977), television presenter, grew up in Woy Woy.
- Olive Riley (1899–2008), second oldest online blogger and YouTube user.
- Josh Ross (born 1981), Indigenous track-and-field Olympian, from the age of seven attended Woy Woy Public School.
- Liesl Tesch (born 1969), wheelchair Basketball player, sailor and politician, lives in Woy Woy.
- Simon Townsend (1945–2025), journalist, television host and presenter, spent some time in Woy Woy.

== Sports ==
Woy Woy is also home to several sporting teams which compete in Central Coast competitions, including the Roosters (rugby league – competed in Sydney's Jim Beam Cup, but not any more), Sharks (cricket), Woy Woy FC (since 1965) (football), Lions (rugby union) and the Peninsula Swans (Australian rules). Woy Woy is also home to the Woy Woy Tennis Club, one of the oldest Tennis clubs on the Central Coast.

== Churches ==
- St Luke's Anglican Church
- St John the Baptist Catholic Church
- PeninsulaEV Church

== Transport ==
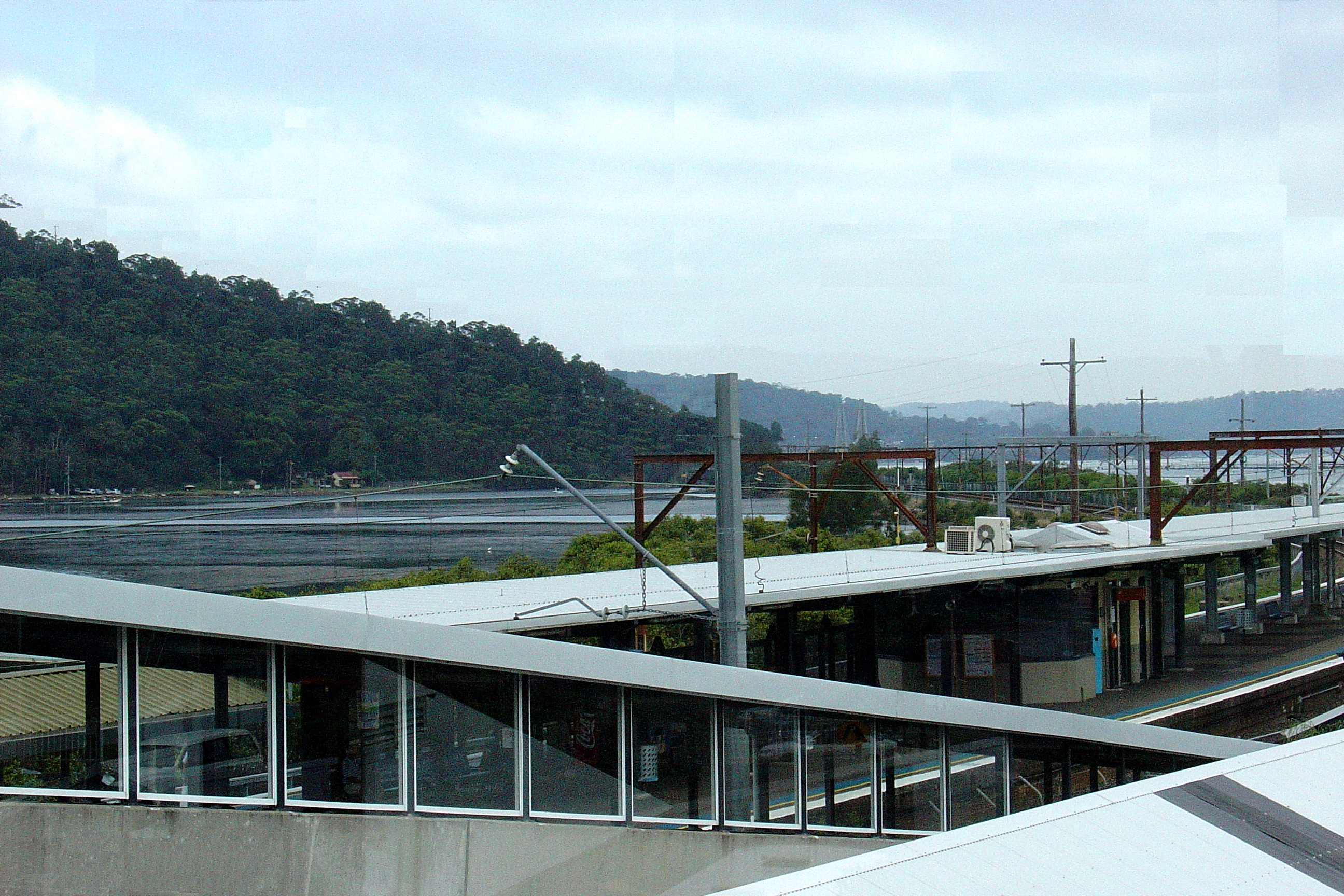
Woy Woy railway station's waterfront location

Woy Woy railway station is on the Sydney Trains intercity network. It is a major commuter hub which moves significant numbers of local workers into Sydney and Newcastle each day. The station is also a major bus interchange with Busways services connecting Woy Woy with other Peninsula centres including Umina Beach and Ettalong Beach. Central Coast Ferries services also operate from the Woy Woy wharf connecting with villages around Brisbane Water including Davistown. Busways also operates 10 bus routes through Woy Woy to its surrounding suburbs.

== See also ==
- List of reduplicated Australian place names
