= Brisbane Water National Park =

Protected area in New South Wales, Australia

- IUCN category II (national park)
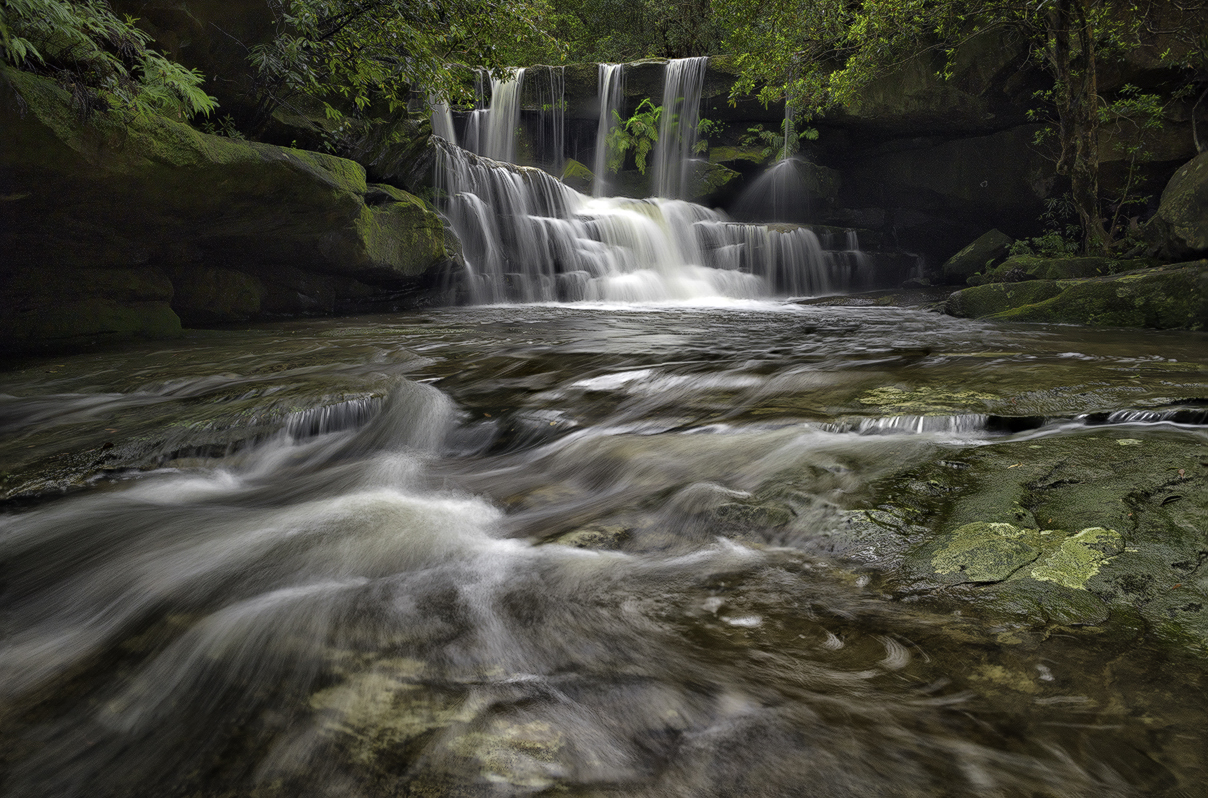
- Waterfall in the deeper areas of the Brisbane Water National Park

- Location within New South Wales
- Location: New South Wales
- Nearest city: Gosford
- Area: 115.06 km^{2} (44.42 sq mi)
- Established: September 1959
- Governing body: NSW National Parks & Wildlife Service
- Website: http://www.nationalparks.nsw.gov.au/Brisbane-Water-National-Park

Brisbane Water National Park is a national park on the Central Coast of New South Wales, Australia. The national park is situated 70 kilometres (43 mi) north of Sydney and 12 kilometres (7.5 mi) southwest of Gosford. It consists the Brisbane Water and Mooney Mooney Creek waterways.

The National Park includes Lion Island and Spectagle Island near the Pacific Ocean. Brisbane Water National Park features fertile valleys which runs along the northern side of the Hawkesbury River towards Brisbane Water and the Pacific Ocean. The national park has an area of 11,506-hectare (28,430-acre) and is inhabited by the Darkinjung people.

== Features ==
The park has many pleasant and interesting walks that can vary from mild to rugged. One walk that can be easily accessed via public transport, is the walk to Pindar Cave on the escarpment above the Wondabyne railway station, which is a request-stop on the Central Coast railway line. The Great North Walk, that leads from Sydney to Newcastle, passes through the park.

The national park is bounded to the south by the Hawkesbury River; to the west by part of the Pacific Highway, part of the M1 Pacific Motorway, and the Peats Ridge Road; with the latter also forming the northern boundary; and to the east by the Brisbane Water, the Central Coast railway line, and urban areas. The Hawkesbury River Railway Bridge, part of the Central Coast Highway, part of the Pacific Highway and part of the M1 Motorway bisect various sections of the national park.

== Description ==
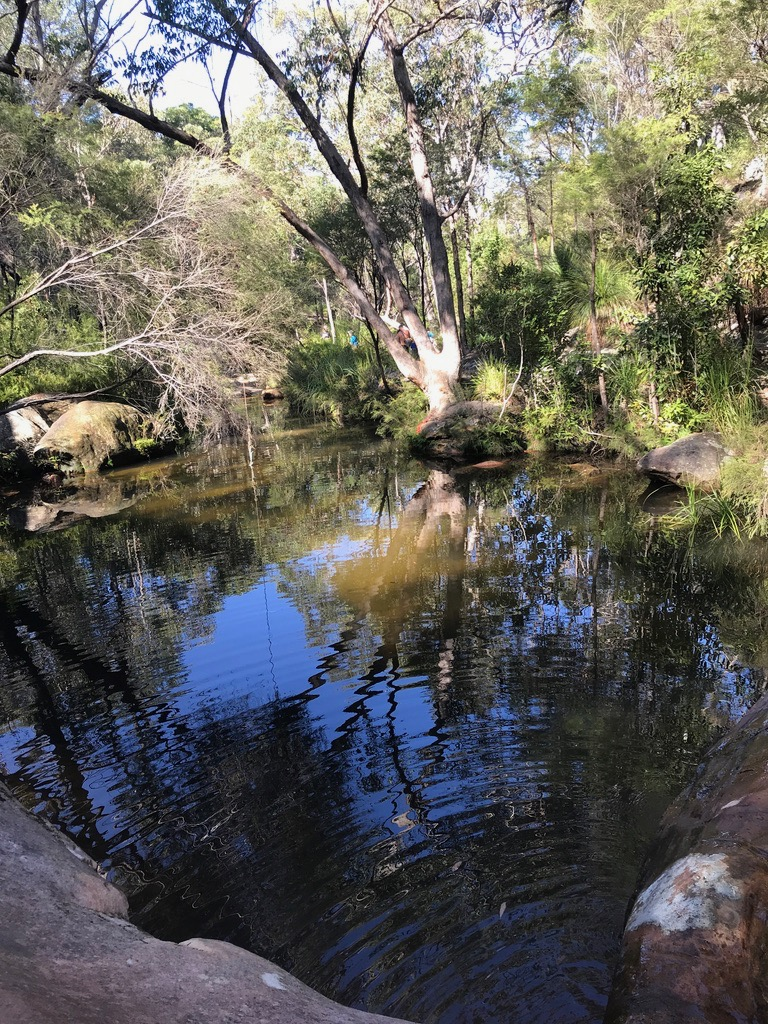
Natural swimming hole in Brisbane Water National Park

Brisbane Water National Park is described as a "living space" for plant and animal communities in the National Parks Plan of Management. The park is a sanctuary for plant and animal communities to adapt and migrate in the face of climate change. The size and shape of the park should allow adjustment in the northwest and wouth for biological adjustment. The park is a system of reserves protecting the state's significant waterways of the lower Hawkesbury River, Broken Bay and Brisbane Water. The park also protects a range of Aboriginal sites and extends the representation of rock art from the Sydney Basin in the National Park systems. The geology is mainly in the Hawksbury series of cross bedded quartz sandstone, conglomerates, and grey and red shales.

== Biology and ecology ==
The park covers enough area to provide critical nesting and breeding sites for several species whose territories range over surrounding rural and urban areas. For many of these species the park provides the only secure available land for them to find seclusion from human impacts. For many of these plant and animal species the park is the only available habitat which provides the necessary resources for their survival such as tree hollows. The main vegetation communities found in the park are low-open forests, low-open woodland, and open woodland accompanied by either a dry or moist understorey. Rainforest communities occur in sheltered sections of valleys and along streams. Twenty vegetation communities are represented in the park, all of which are considered endangered under the NSW Threatened Species Conservation Act 1995. Five are listed as critically endangered under the Environment Protection and Biodiversity Conservation Act 1999 (EPBC). The critically endangered communities listed in the EPBC act in the park are: Blue Gum High Forest in the Sydney Basin Bioregion, Littoral Rainforest in the New South Wales North Coast, Lowland Rainforest in the NSW North Coast and Sydney Basin Bioregions, Shale Sandstone Transition Forest in the Sydney Basin Bioregion, and Western Sydney Dry Rainforest in the Sydney Basin Bioregion.

The Blue Gum High Forest is a tall open forest community where the Sydney blue gum (Eucalyptus saligna) dominates the canopy layer. Other tree species that occur in this community are: blackbutt (E. pilularis), forest oak (Allocasuarina torulosa), and Sydney red gum (Angophora costata). Species occurring in the shrub layer are ones adapted to moist habitats. Only around 4.5% of the Blue Gum High Forest remains, now occurring in small remnants. It only occurs in areas where rainfall is high and soil fertility is good. For this reason it can only occur in small sections which are suitable for growth. Understorey species rely on bird and mammal species to distribute seeds and this community does not cope well in fire events. The Blue Gum High Forest is known to occur in Brisbane Water National Park and is now reliant on national park status as protection from habitat degradation, as well as good park management with regards to invasive species control and fire regimes.

== Flora ==
A number of areas in Brisbane Water National Park contain rare and endangered plants. It is likely that these remnant populations demonstrate the ways that environmental conditions have changed in the past few thousand years. In some cases these rare species are remnants of populations that would have been extensive before widespread clearing took place for urban and agricultural use. The park encompasses a wide variety of flora with 814 species recorded. The diversity of plant species and plant communities is reflective of variations in geology, soils, hydrology, aspect, and fire history. Ten of the recorded plant species are considered to be rare and several others are uncommon or restricted in their distribution. The park hosts a number of vulnerable and threatened species as listed under the EPBC act. Vulnerable species include: thick-leaf star-hair (Astrotricha crassifolia), Camfield's stringybark (Eucalyptus camfieldii), Deane's paperbark (Melaleuca deanei), and Grevillea shiressii. The endangered Somersby mintbush (Prostanthera junonis) is also present in the park.

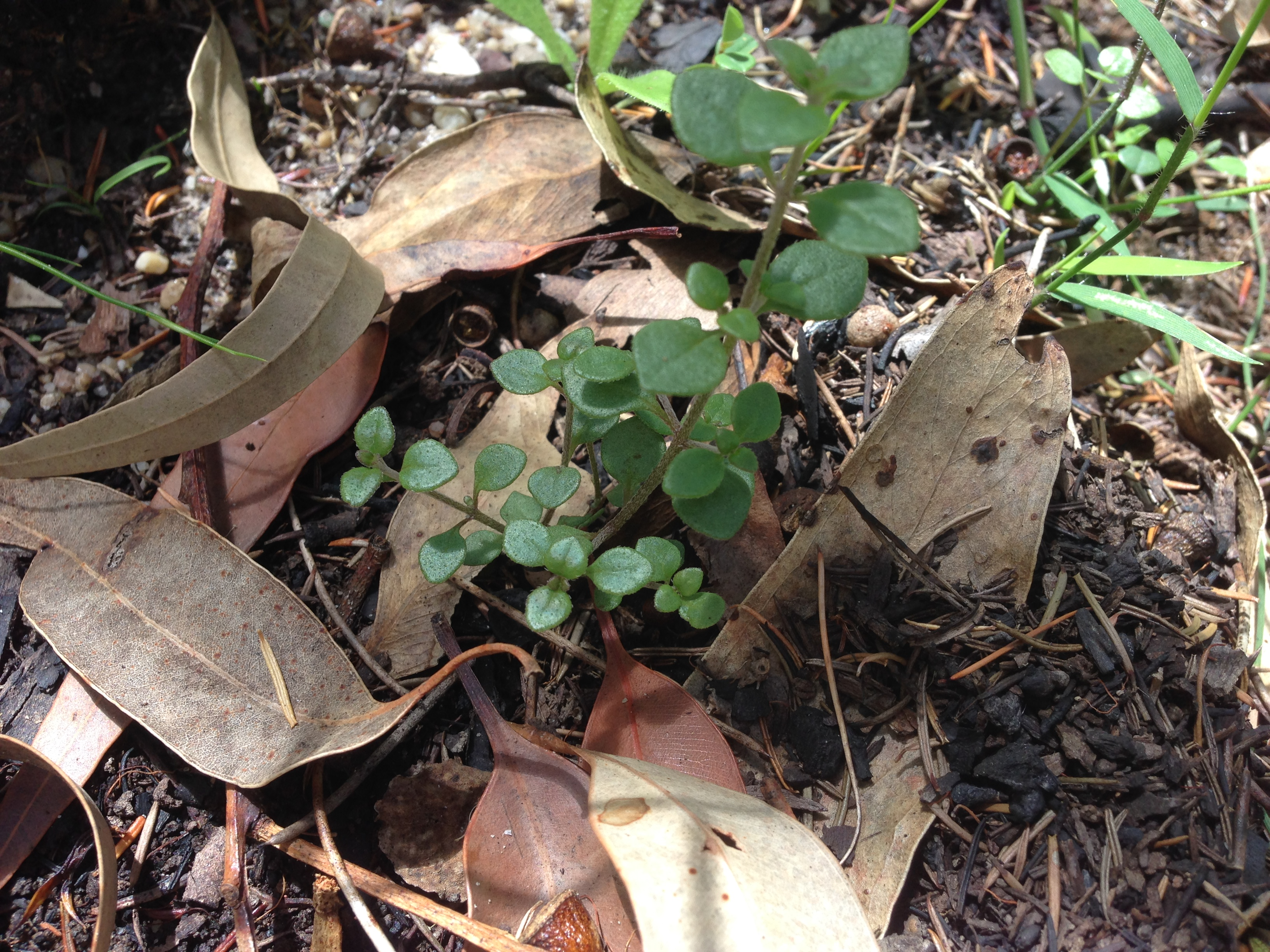
Somersby mintbush

The donkey orchid (Diuris bracteata) has been recorded in the area in recent times after having been listed as extinct under the commonwealth status. The donkey orchid resides in dry sclerophyll woodland and forest with a predominantly grassy understorey. Recordings in the Gosford and Wyong areas are the only existing species known to survive.

The vulnerable Camfield stringybarks (Eucalyptus camfieldii) range in NSW has contracted and is now only found in small numbers isolated mainly to nationals parks surrounding Sydney. The species is either a mallee-like shrub or a tree up to 9 metres bearing heart shaped leaves as a juvenile. Too frequent or not frequent enough wildfire activity is a threat to its survival, where frequent fires impact its ability to grow seed capsules and infrequent fires result in competition from taller vegetation. The main threats to this species are: Competition from invasive non-native species and degradation of habitat from weeds, inappropriate or changed fire regimes including frequency, intensity, and timing, habitat loss and fragmentation from development, and low genetic diversity as a result of contracted population numbers.

The endangered Somersby mintbush (Prostanthera junonis) is only known to occur in the Somersby Plateau area in nine locations after having been previously present in a broader range. The bush grows low with most of the branches growing along the ground to a maximum height of around 30 cm (12 in). Its flowers are pale mauve to almost white. Most of the remaining population are present in Brisbane Water National Park and face similar threats to Camfield's Stringybark which are: habitat degradation, invasive weed competition, and inappropriate fire regimes.

== Fauna ==
The allocation of land in the National Park has provided and conserved valuable habitat to a range of vulnerable and endangered species as listed under the EPBC act. In total 261 species of fauna have been recorded in the park, all of which are listed as protected by the National Parks and Wildlife Act 1974 (except invasive species). 26 native mammal species are known to occur in the park and 30 species of frog which represent 9 of the continent's 27 genera have been recorded. 50 species of reptiles representing one-third of the continent's reptile genera are also found in the park.

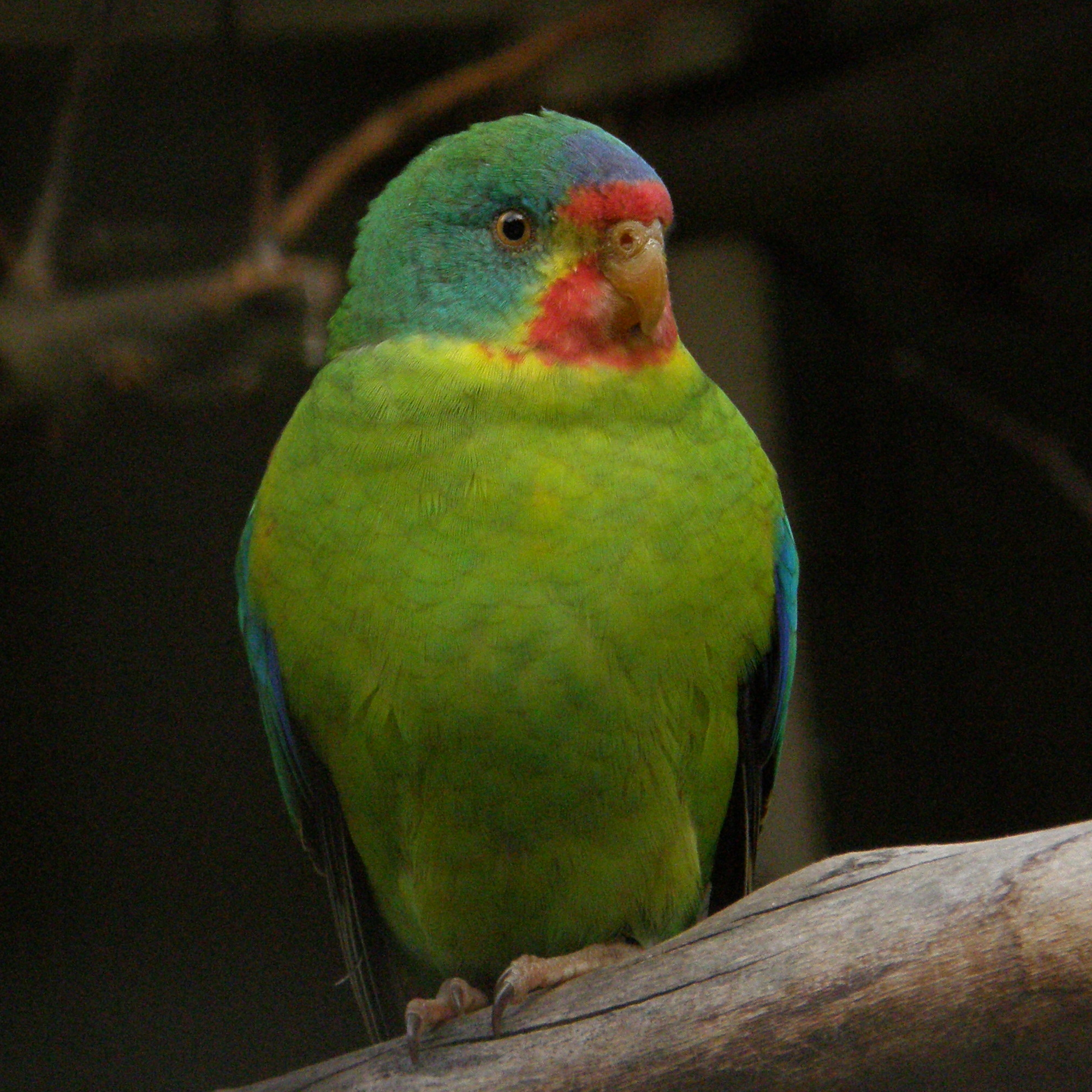
Swift parrot (Lathamus discolor)

Over 150 species of birds have been recorded. Habitat destruction and fragmentation has impacted many of the species, this is an example of the significance of preserved habitat which the park provides. A number of birds found in the park are considered rare in the Sydney bioregion due to lost habitat, these include: Collared sparrowhawk (Accipiter cirrhocephalus), Pacific baza (Aviceda subcristata), Lewin's rail (Rallus pectoralis), buff-banded rail (Rallus philippensis), yellow-tailed black cockatoo (Calyptorhynchus funereus), glossy black cockatoo (Calyptorhynchus lathami), gang-gang cockatoo (Callocephalon fimbriatum), powerful owl (Ninox strenua), Australian masked owl (Tyto novaehollandiae), and the red-browed treecreeper (Climacteris erythrops).

The endangered swift parrot (Lathamus discolour) has been recorded in the park during their migration from Tasmania between March and October. This species returns to foraging sites depending on food availability and available habitat in tree hollows. The critically endangered regent honeyeater (Anthochaera Phrygia) has been sighted in the park. Regent honeyeater range has contracted significantly in recent times and they face a significantly high risk of extinction in the near future The regent honeyeater is a flagship species whose conservation benefits a wide variety of other threatened and vulnerable woodland fauna. Foraging non breeding flocks are recorded on the Central Coast every few years and rely on healthy woodland which is species rich for their survival.

Other migratory bird species known to visit the park are the white-throated needletail (Hirundapus caudacutus), The Caspian tern (Hydroprogne caspia), and the white-bellied sea-eagle (Haliaeetus leucogaster). These seasonal bird species are protected under several migratory bird agreements with China, Korea, and Japan.

Other than birds, the following EPBC endangered species are known to occur in the park: giant burrowing frog (Heleioporus australiacus), green sea turtle (Chelonia mydas), The koala (Phascolarctos cinereus), which is now restricted in distribution on the Central Coast, spotted-tailed quoll (Dasyurus maculatus), lLong-nosed potoroo (Potorous tridactylus), grey-headed flying fox (Pteropus poliocephalus), large-eared pied bat (Chalinolobus dwyeri), and the New Holland mouse (Pseudomys novaehollandiae).

Rosenberg's goanna (Varanus rosenbergi), eastern pygmy possum (Cercartetus nanus), and the squirrel glider (Petaurus norfolcensis) are species listed as vulnerable which inhabit the park.

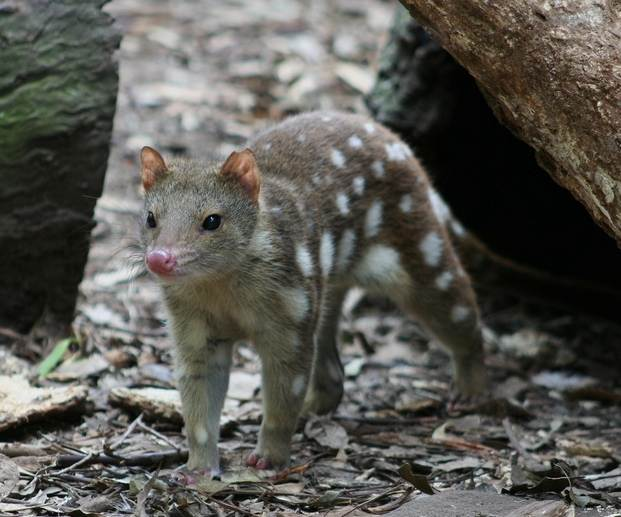
Spotted-tail quoll (Dasyurus maculatus)

All of these species are listed as endangered and vulnerable on the EPBC threatened species list mainly due to habitat loss, fragmentation of suitable habitat, degradation of habitat such as removal of dead trees and logs, introduction of feral species, inappropriate fire regimes, and climate change. The spotted tail quoll (Dasyurus maculatus) is in serious decline due to habitat loss, competition from predators, and poisoning from humans. The quoll occupies a large home range meaning they require a lot of space for foraging, and is therefore mainly restricted to large reserves and national parks. The species require suitable den sites which can be tree and log hollows, rock outcrops, and caves. Habitat fragmentation and degradation are severe impacts for this species as smaller parcels of fragmented land do not provide the necessary habitat, rainfall, nesting sites, and prey, which the spotted tail quoll relies on for survival.

The koala (Phascolarctos cinereus) and the squirrel glider (Petaurus norfolcensis), are arboreal marsupials broadly distributed in Eastern Australian forests and woodlands. Arboreal marsupials rely on habitat which is influenced by the size and species of trees present, the soil nutrients, amount of rainfall, and climate. The squirrel glider and other glider species found in the park specifically rely on the shelter of tree hollows and on flowering Acacia and Banksia genus shrubs for food. Urban development, agriculture, and infrastructure is increasingly fragmenting the required habitat for these species and they are therefore more reliant on protected areas. Even species such as the Powerful Owl (Ninox strenua) that can tolerate some habitat fragmentation still rely on available tree hollows for nesting and the availability of prey. Forest dependent species such as the marsupial gliders and ground dwelling mammals are relied on for food by owl species, therefore reduction in the abundance of prey due to habitat fragmentation is an indirect impact on owls.

== Environmental threats ==
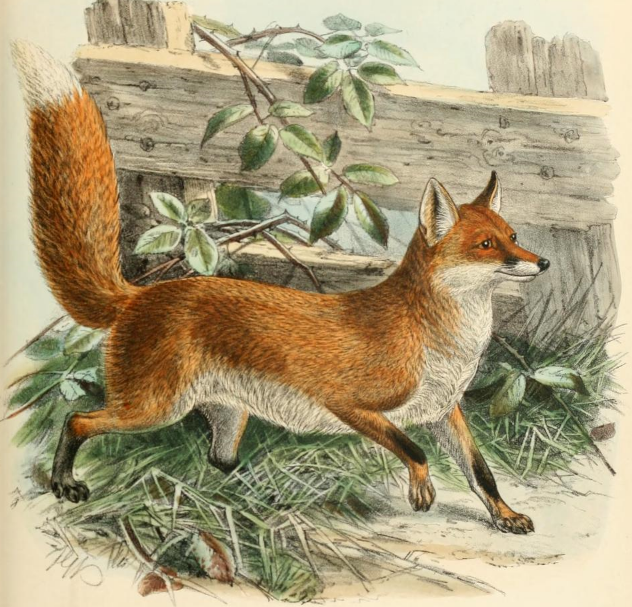
Common fox (Vulpes vulpes)

Brisbane Water National Park is vulnerable to various environmental threats. Introduced invasive feral animals are of particular concern, this includes foxes (Vulpes vulpes), wild dogs (Canis familiaris), and cats (Felis catus). Wild dogs and cats are of particular concern due to the proximity of the park to areas of highly urbanised land use. This makes the wild dog and cat issue particularly prevalent. Cats and wild dogs are significant predators because they interact with fauna in a number of ways, for instance predation, outcompeting natives for resources, and transmitting disease. This impacts the native fauna as wild dogs generally prey on large and medium species such as wallabies and possums, and cats prey on medium and small prey including reptiles and small mammals. These pests can cause local extinctions and are a real threat to species which are already vulnerable or endangered.

Invasive weeds are a threat to the natural processes within the park. The low fertility of the soil does not readily facilitate weed growth ), however once they become established they can quickly out compete native species and are a real threat to the vulnerable and endangered species and communities. Eroding soils from degradation and increased transport of sediment from nearby runoff can transport sediments and nutrients which encourages weed growth. An example of the significance of weed invasion is the previously mentioned Blue Gum High Forest and Somersby mintbush (Prostanthera junonis) which are susceptible to weed invasion. Pest species displace natives and alter the ecosystem functions which creates ongoing implications such as altered fire patterns and changed nutrient cycling. The proximity of urban dwellings to the national park allows weed seeds to be easily introduced on a regular basis, which means regular maintenance and monitoring is required to ensure invasive species are kept in control. The biggest threat from invasive weeds is the degradation of biological diversity and is therefore a major environmental threat within the park. Further environmental threats are present in that the park is boarded by intensive urban, industrial, and agricultural development. The larger streams which form part of the park have their headwaters and catchment areas outside the park boundary giving rise to major management issues. These management issues are largely due to altered natural processes such as sedimentation and nutrient alterations.

== Park management ==
Brisbane Water National Park is under the jurisdiction of the NSW National Parks and Wildlife Service, under the Office of Environment & Heritage. Park management is vital in conserving biodiversity by offering physical protection to vulnerable and endangered wildlife. This refuge for Australian native plants, animals, and ecosystems allows research programs and conservation initiatives to be undertaken such as weeding and pest control programs to restore native habitats. Fire management strategies are developed in the balance of protecting life, Aboriginal sites, historical sites, and natural processes. The areas surrounding the national park on plateaus was easily settled, therefore the remaining area originally reserved for parkland was limited to remnant areas on the plateau and areas of the catchments in Mooney Mooney, Patonga, and Mullet Creeks, because these areas remained inaccessible for settlement, they are generally harder for access. The locations of settlements mean the national park is hemmed in on two sides by development. The threats to the park caused by intensive agricultural, urban, and industrial development on the boundaries and headwaters make the management of the park difficult, and are increasing over time with continual development proposals such as those on the Kariong and Somersby plateaus which are in various catchment areas of the park. The following are some of the other management issues in the park. Woy Woy refuse tip is an inholding within the park which is a particular management issue as it is within the Patonga Creek Catchment. Agricultural, industrial, and domestic runoff from surrounding developments have long term harmful impacts on aquatic plant communities. Weeds also spread down creek lines from runoff. Fire suppression and management trails need to be planned so potential impacts and erosion which leads to sedimentation of creeks is minimised. Dirt bikes and four wheel drive access to the park is not permitted. Physical damage to plants and soils occurs and erosion has further impacts. Their access is hard to manage as many possible entry points are available.

== See also ==
- Protected areas of New South Wales
