= Sixty-miler =

Coal ships used in New South Wales, Australia

A sixty-miler entering Newcastle under ballast in 1923

Sixty-miler (60-miler) is the colloquial name for the ships that were used in the coastal coal trade of New South Wales, Australia. The sixty-milers delivered coal to Sydney from ports and ocean jetties to the north and south. The name refers to the approximate distance by sea from Newcastle to Sydney; the distance, from the Hunter River mouth at Nobbys Head to the North Head of Sydney Harbour, is 64 nautical miles.

== Coastal coal-carrying trade of New South Wales ==
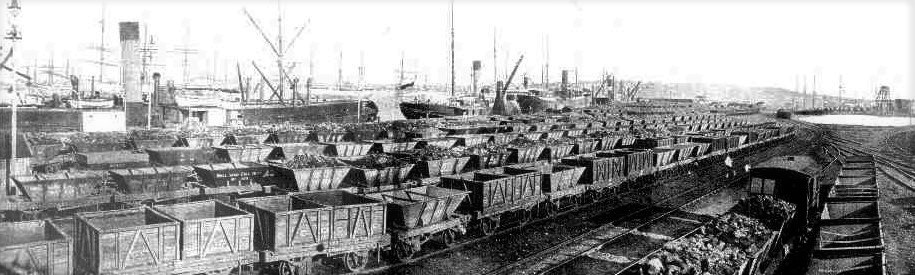
Loading coal at 'the Dyke' c.1900

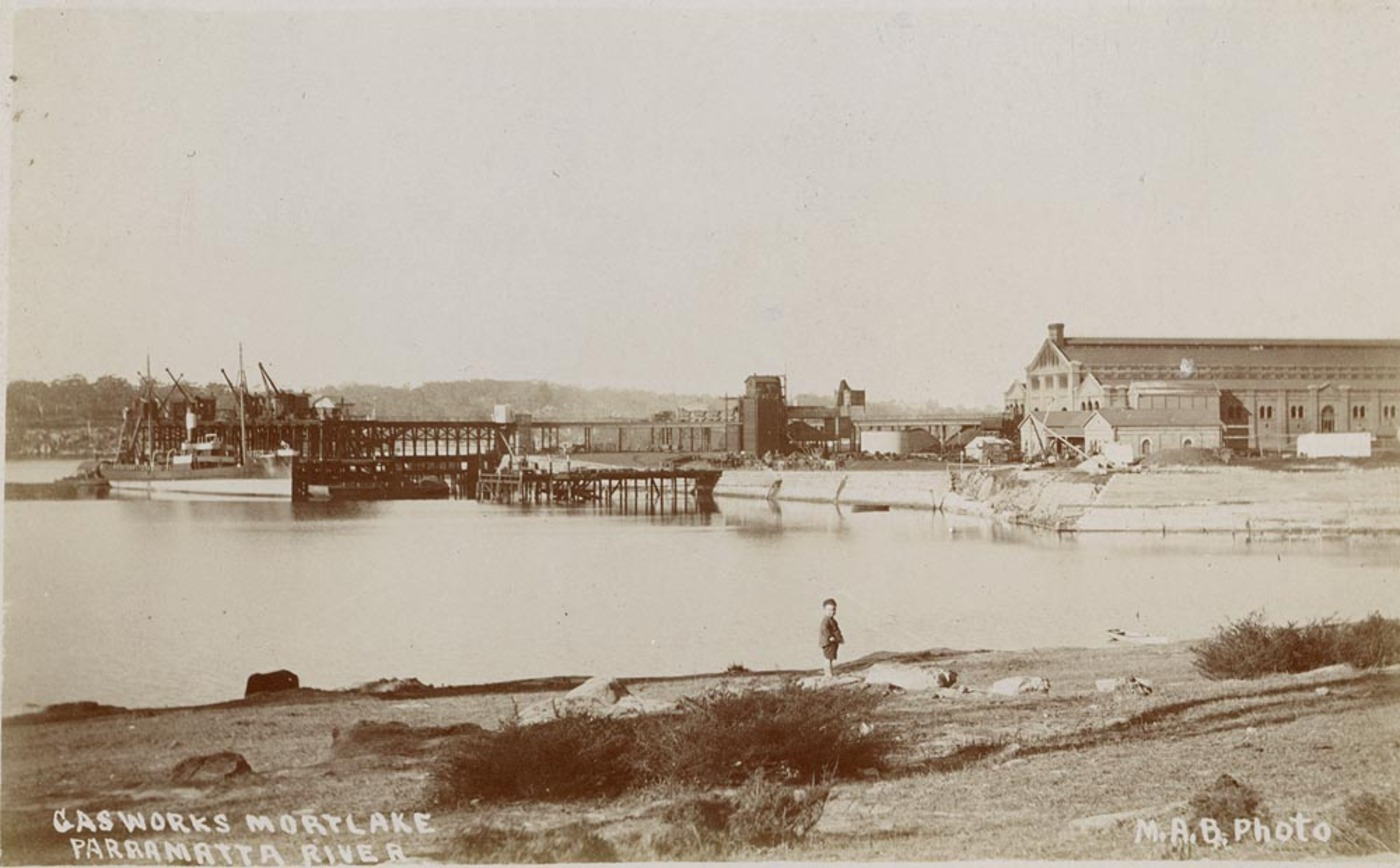
Coal Wharf - AGL Gasworks at Mortlake on the Parramatta River with a sixty-miler alongside

The coastal coal-carrying trade of New South Wales, involved the shipping of coal to Sydney for local consumption or for bunkering steamships. The coal was carried from ports of the northern and southern coal fields of New South Wales to Sydney. It took place in the 19th and 20th centuries. It does not refer to export coal trade that used larger vessels and continues today.

Coal from the northern coalfields was loaded at Hexham on the Hunter River, Carrington (The Dyke and The Basin) and Stockton both near Newcastle, at jetties on Lake Macquarie, and at the ocean jetty at Catherine Hill Bay. In the early years of the trade, coal was loaded at Newcastle itself on the southern bank of the Hunter River, at the river port of Morpeth, and at a wharf at Reid's Mistake at Swansea Heads.

Coal from the southern coal fields, at various times, was loaded at Wollongong Harbour and Port Kembla and at the ocean jetty ports: Bellambi; Coalcliff; Hicks Point at Austinmer; and Sandon Point, Bulli. Port Kembla was originally an ocean jetty port but two breakwaters were added later to provide shelter.

At Sydney, coal wharves were located at the gasworks (Millers Point, Mortlake, Neutral Bay, Waverton and Spring Cove at Manly). Coal was unloaded at the Ball's Head Coal Loader—for steamship coal bunkering and in later years for export—and at the coal depot at Blackwattle Bay. Before the Ball's Head Coal Loader opened in 1920, coal was manually loaded by 'coal lumpers' to steamship bunkers, from sixty-milers standing alongside. Some industrial customers, such as CSR at Pyrmont, had their own facilities to unload coal

Coal was also unloaded on Botany Bay, from time to time, at the Government Pier (or 'Long Pier') at Botany and also for various customers at wharves located on the banks of the Alexandra Canal (also known as Shea's Creek).

Sixty-milers sometimes also carried crushed basalt construction aggregate—or blue metal—from the port at Kiama and the ocean jetty at Bass Point (Shellharbour) on the South Coast of New South Wales. The blue metal was unloaded at Blackwattle Bay in Sydney Harbour. There was also a similar type of small bulk cargo ships, usually dedicated to carrying construction aggregate, known as the Stone Fleet. Some 'Stone Fleet' ships carried coal from time to time.

== The sixty-milers ==
Although the earliest sixty-milers were sailing vessels, the term was most typically applied to the small coal-fired steamers with reciprocating engines that were used during the late 19th and 20th Centuries. In the last years of the coastal coal trade, some sixty-milers were diesel-powered motor vessels.

=== Design ===
The steam-powered sixty-milers were relatively small vessels typically between 200 and 1500 gross tons—most were under 1000 gross tons—but some were even lighter. The smallest of the sixty-milers—ships like the Novelty and Commonwealth—were suitable to use the shallow Swansea Channel at the entrance to Lake Macquarie. In the earlier years, some sixty-milers were wooden ships, most were iron or steel vessels. Ships larger than the sixty-milers were used for interstate and export coal carrying service. Some earlier vessels were paddle-steamers but most were screw steamers. The iron and steel vessels followed the British collier design of their day—unsurprisingly given the existence of a quite similar coastal coal carrying trade in Britain—and most were British-built.

The typical sixty-miler in the first half of the 20th-Century had a high bow but lower well deck where the hatches for the two holds were located. When laden, the ships had a low freeboard and relied upon the combings, hatch covers and tarpaulins over the hatches when the sea broke over the well deck. There was some variation in the design of the bridge and superstructure arrangements; the bridge could be either amidships or at the rear; the engine and fuel-coal bunkers could be amidships or toward the rear. Depending on the arrangement of the superstructure, the ships had either two of three masts. Some sixty-milers—such as the Marjorie, Bellambi and Malachite—had multiple gaffs on each of their masts, which were used when in port to suspend the planks used in manual coal bunkering operations.

William McArthur, built for RW Miller, and delivered, in 1924, was the first sixty-miler with aft engines and equipped with grabs to allow self-discharging.

For most sixty-milers, ballast was provided by several water tanks located low inside the hull and running for most of the length of the vessel. Ships like the Undola that worked shallow ocean jetty ports, were designed with a shallow draft and self-trimming hatches, to minimise the chance of touching bottom during loading and to allow quick departures to be made. Some sixty-milers in the 19th century and early 20th century were a type known as 'auxiliary steamers' that could raise triangular or trapezoidal sails on their masts. The Myola, could unfurl sails on her two tall masts and gain a knot or so of additional speed when the wind suited.

It was unusual for a sixty-miler to be converted from another type of vessel, but it did happen. The iron auxiliary steamer, Governor Blackall, was built at Mort's Dock in 1871, for the Queensland Government and originally carried mail and passengers; she later became a sixty-miler associated with the mine at Bulli, and ended her life as a coal hulk.

=== The ship owners and operators ===
A vessel might be owned by one entity but chartered to another. The Hexham Bank may have been described as an RW Miller ship when in fact it was on charter from its actual owners McIlwraith, McEacharn & Company of Melbourne, which itself owned and operated other similarly named sixty-milers (Mortlake Bank, Pelton Bank and Hetton Bank). RW Miller not only chartered ships like the Hexham Bank but also owned its own ships such as the Birchgrove Park. The southern coalfield collieries (Coalcliff Collieries, etc.) owned their own ships but most of these were chartered to the Southern Coal Owner's Agency, which operated the ships. Some coal merchants, such as Jones Brothers Coal, owned their own ships.

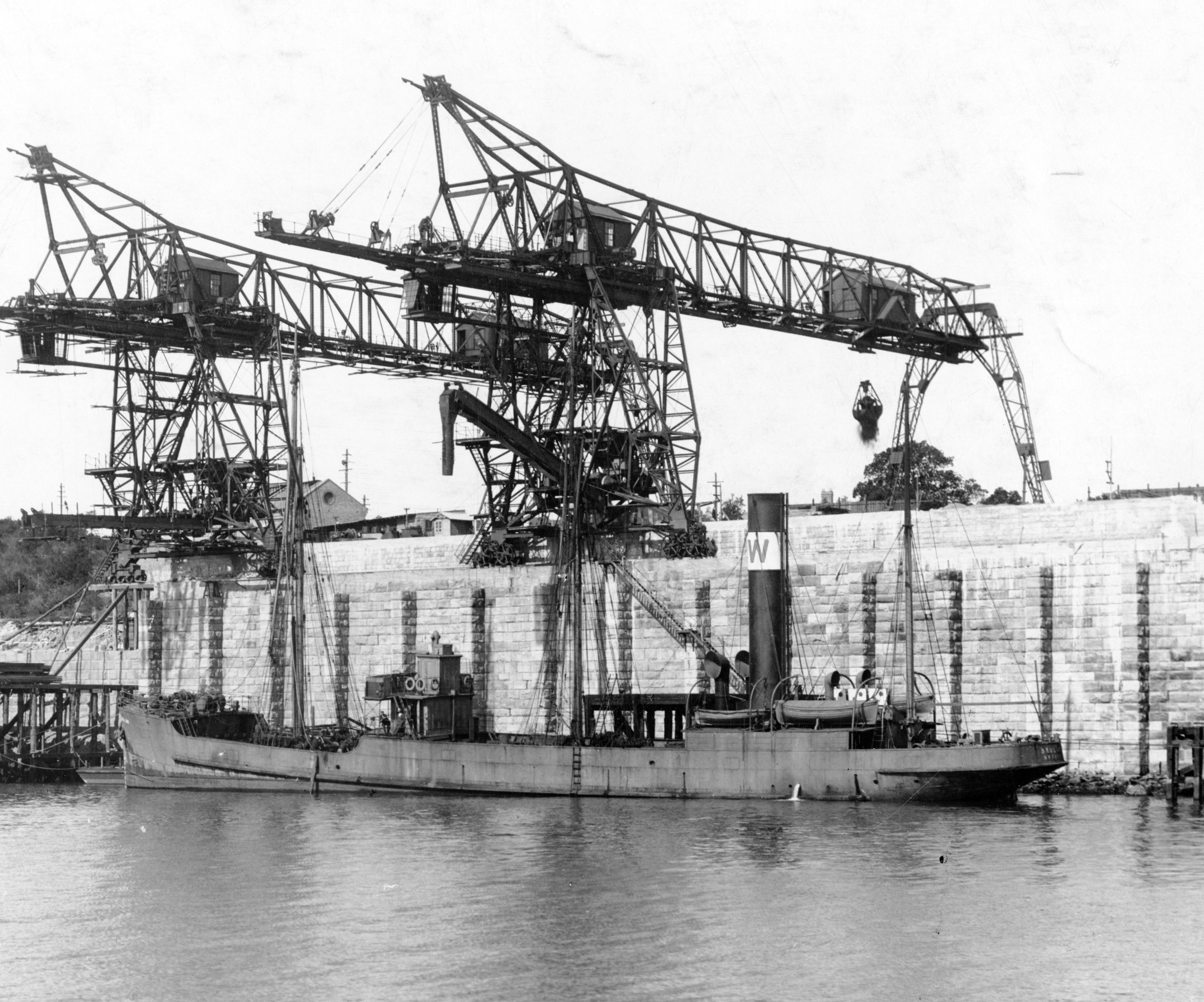
Beulah unloading coal at Balls Head Coal Loader, in 1930. Note the 'W' on her funnel

Ships were bought and sold, and changed ownership, while still carrying coal cargoes for their new owners. Sometimes, a change in ownership also resulted in a ship's name changing, such as when Corrimal was renamed Ayrfield or when South Bulli became Abersea. There were many owners up to the middle of 20th-Century, sometimes just owning or operating on charter just one vessel. There are also numerous instances of new vessels taking the name of their predecessor (e.g. Bellambi, Wallarah, etc.).

Some operators ran not only the ships but also mines or port operations, even for some at both ends of the sixty-miler's run. A notable example was the Wallarah Coal Co, which operated Wallarah Colliery, Catherine Hill Bay jetty, and, between 1934 and 1963, the Balls Head Coal Loader. Wallarah Coal also owned two of the three mechanised coal hulks that worked on Sydney Harbour, Fortuna and Muscoota; the other one, Sampson, was owned by Bellambi Coal. Another such operator was RW. Miller, a company that began life operating lighters on Sydney Harbour. It bought its first sixty-miler, Audrey D., in 1919, going on to become a major operator of sixty-milers. In 1920, it purchased the Ayrfield Colliery, followed by other mines in the Hunter Region. The company had a coal wharf and depot at Blackwattle Bay, and, from 1959, RW Miller also had a coal loader at Hexham.

The little ships' operator, in most cases, could be identified by a letter or letters, inside a light-coloured band or diamond-shaped background, on the sixty-miler's funnel; for example, 'B' was Bellambi Coal Co., 'C & A' was Coal & Allied, 'J' was J & A Brown (later JABAS), 'JB' was Jones Brothers Coal, 'M' was Miller (RW Miller), and 'W' was for Wallarah Coal Co.

=== Operation and crewing ===
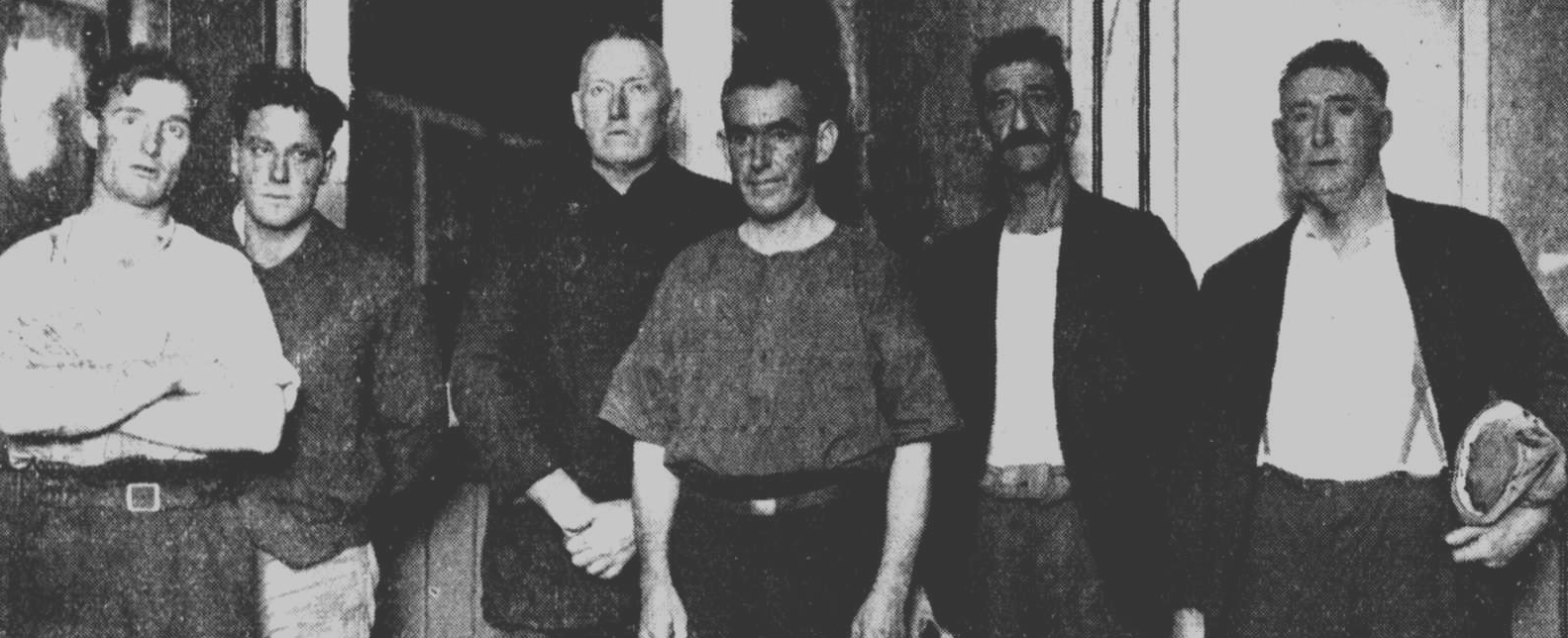
Half of her crew; the survivors of Annie M. Miller, photographed when they landed at Watsons Bay, four hours after she sank, February 1929.

Due to the short distances between Sydney and the coal ports, and for commercial reasons, the sixty-milers made frequent trips of short duration, carrying coal to Sydney and in ballast for the return trip.

The coal cargo was stored in the holds in bulk and needed to be "trimmed" to ensure that its distribution did not result in a list to one side or the other. Typically, trimming was done by the ship's crew, although depending on the sophistication of the loading arrangements coal was loaded in such a way as to minimise the need for trimming.

The ships could be loaded relatively quickly and be at sea in time to complete the trip to Sydney from Newcastle in six or so hours; it would take longer in bad weather. Operation of the sixty-milers was typically six-days per week and around the clock.

A crew of 10 to 16 was typical, depending upon the size of the ship. A crew of a sixty-miler (1919) would include a master, two mates, two engineers, a donkeyman, two firemen, four to six seamen, a cook and a steward.

== Incidents, losses and inquiries ==
Over the years of the coastal coal-carrying trade, many sixty-milers were wrecked, involved in collisions with other ships or reefs, or foundered. A common factor in most of the losses of sixty milers was bad weather. In some losses, a factor seemed to be a haste to put to sea and get the cargo to Sydney. Another factor was the use of ocean jetties at some coal loading ports.

=== Hazards of ocean jetties ===
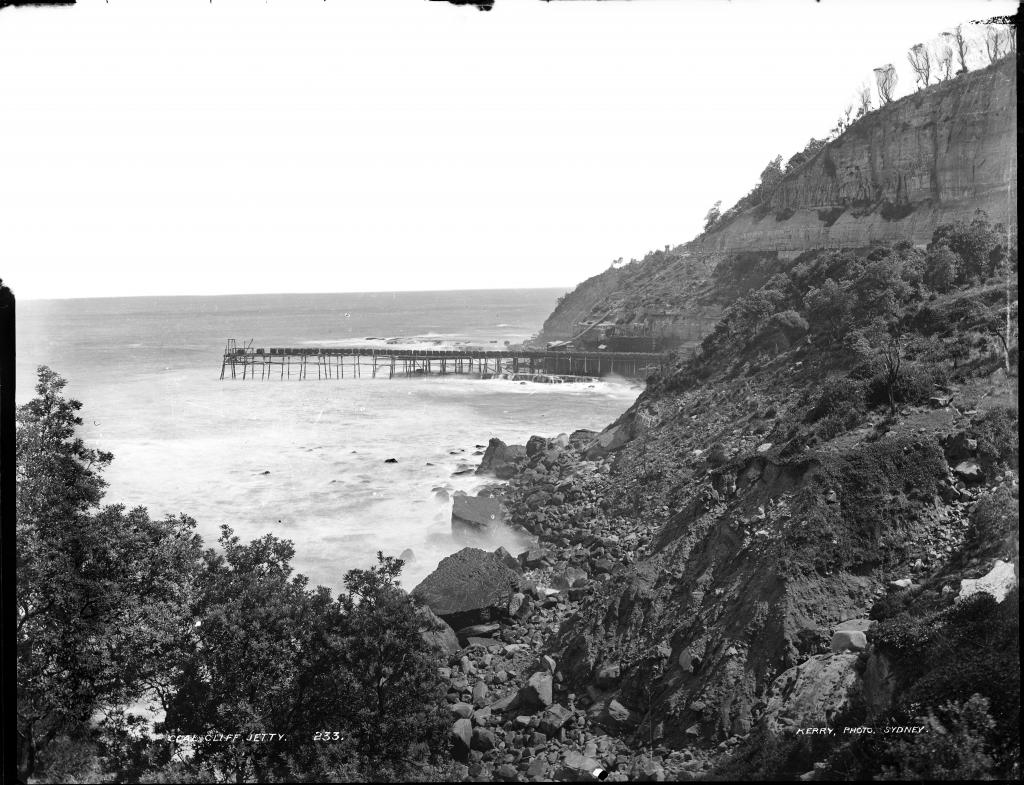
Coalcliff Jetty - the smallest and most exposed of the ocean jetties

The waters in which the ocean jetties were located were in nautical parlance called "open roadsteads", meaning "an area near the shore where vessels anchor with relatively little protection from the sea." Ocean jetties typically were located so as to have some natural protection from the south, against the common "southerly buster". While somewhat protected from the south, all the ocean jetties were exposed to the "black nor'easter", a violent storm that can arise quickly. The jetties had little protection from the winter storms known as 'East Coast lows'. The rocky reefs that provided protection from one direction would themselves become a hazard, when the weather was from the opposite direction.

The loading operation at an ocean jetty itself could be hazardous. In the days before movable loaders, the ship needed to be repositioned under the fixed loading chutes, either to change hatches or to reduce the amount of trimming needed. All this, while in shallow water and close to a rocky shore or beach, made working the jetty ports hazardous.

Ocean jetty ports were more hazardous for sailing vessels than for the more manoeuvrable steamships. Yet, in the earlier years of the coastal trade, coal was mainly shipped on sailing vessels. The perils of these operations were shown by the events of the night of 7 September 1867, when two barques—Matador and Bright Planet—were blown ashore and wrecked at Bulli.

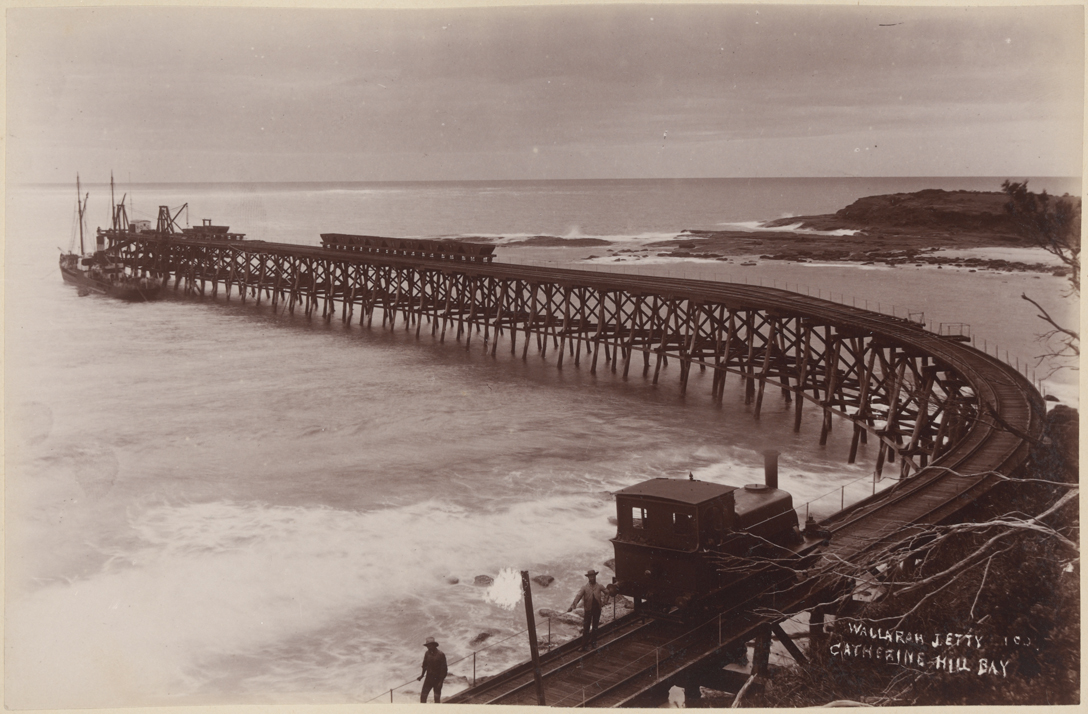
Jetty at Catherine Hill Bay, with a small sixty-miler alongside. The reef is on the right

Catherine Hill Bay was the only ocean jetty on the northern coalfield. On 1 June 1903, the sixty-miler, Illaroo, was driven ashore in a gale. Fortunately, she was refloated and survived. The same year, a fully laden interstate collier, Shamrock, was lost there. On 16 April 1914 the sixty-miler Wallarah, while departing Catherine Hill Bay during a squally "east-nor-easter", was wrecked when heavy seas forced her onto the reef 70-yards to the south of the jetty. In 1920, the small steamer, Lubra, while departing the port, struck a submerged object—probably a wreck—and was holed, she was beached in a desperate attempt to save her, but became a wreck. There were no deaths in these four incidents.

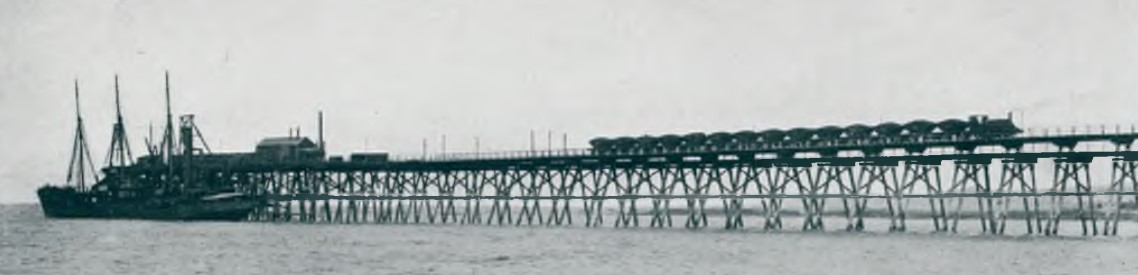
South Bulli Jetty at Bellambi c.1909.

Bellambi was a busy ocean jetty port with a dangerous reef. At least four sixty-milers came to grief there. The sixty-milers wrecked on the reef at Bellambi include Llewellyn (1882), Adinga (1896) and Saxonia (1898). In October 1902, Werfa ran onto the reef, but was able to be refloated, after an hour, and then proceeded to load at the jetty. After making water and running the pumps continuously, on the trip north, the extensive damage to her hull was only identified, after she had discharged her cargo of coal at Sydney. In 1913, an occulting light visible for eight miles to sea was erected, on a steel tower on Bellambi Point, to guide ships away from the dangerous reef. In December 1929, the interstate collier, Kooyong, was attempting to come alongside the jetty to load a cargo of coal for Fremantle. There was a strong wind blowing and she ran into the reef. Using her engines, she was able to break free, after a few minutes, during which her crew feared that "the end had come", as a succession of strong waves struck the ship. Damaged and taking on water, she was able to make for Sydney, where she was repaired. In 1949, the sixty-miler Munmorah, was the last ship to be wrecked on Bellambi Reef. The Court of Marine Inquiry into the loss of the Munmorah was not satisfied that the occulting light was on at the time of the stranding.

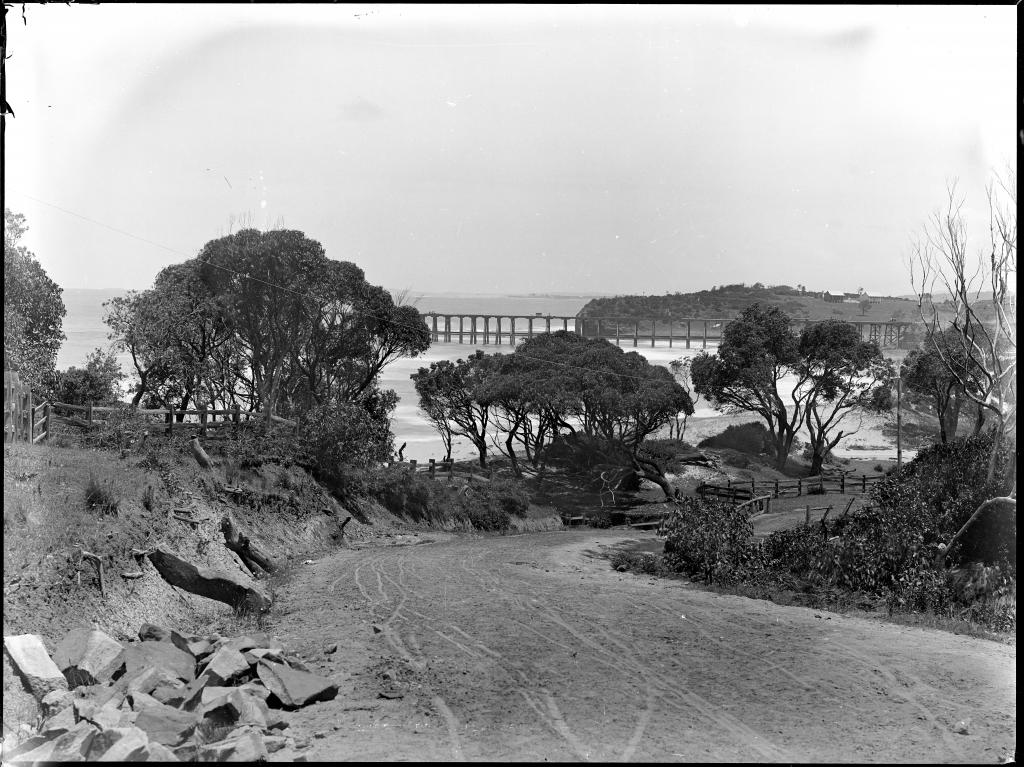
Point Hicks Jetty, in background and partially obscured by trees, viewed looking south from the then Clifton Road (now Lawrence Hargraves Drive)

Any mishap was exacerbated by the unprotected nature of an ocean jetty port. On 7 June 1887, the sixty-miler Waratah was halfway through loading a cargo of coal at the Hicks Point Jetty at Austinmer, when struck by a "southerly buster". Accounts of what happened next vary; she either dragged her anchor and broke her mooring rope or cast off quickly in an attempt to get away. A mooring rope fouled the ship's propeller, leaving her drifting helplessly. She drifted onto a reef of rocks that tore a hole in her. Attempts to tow her off, by Illaroo, which had come from Bulli, failed. A heavy rope was rigged from the ship to the shore and a coal basket was used to bring the crew of fourteen and their belongings—one at a time—to safety. At low tide, the ship was high and dry on the rocks 300-yards to the north of the jetty. A total loss, she was later broken-up in situ for parts. Werfa had a similar but less serious accident at Bellambi in March 1899, when a mooring rope fouled her propeller and the mooring buoy gave way. She drifted onto the sandy beach, harmlessly, missing both the jetties. Fortunately, the sea was calm and she was undamaged; Herga, was able to tow her off the beach.

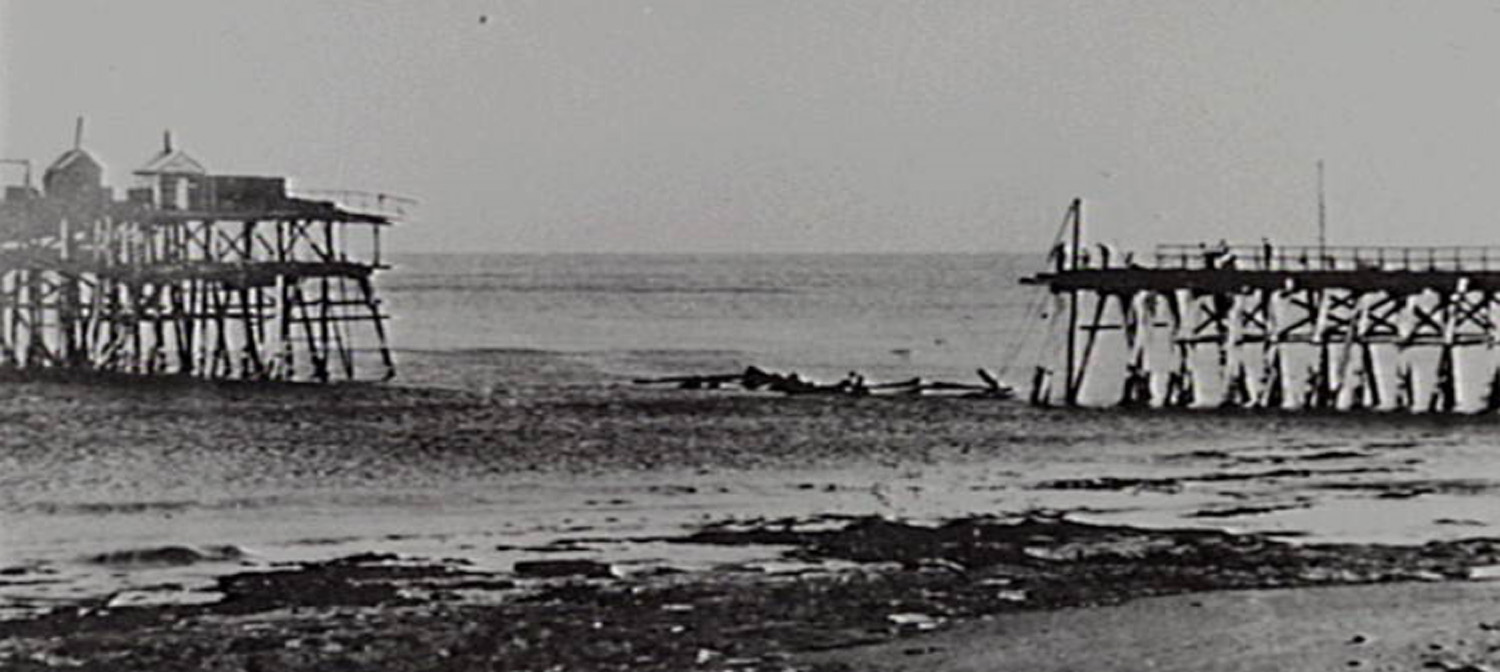
Bulli jetty, after it collapsed during calm weather in 1907.

Another potential difficulty of operations at ocean jetties was damage to the jetty, which could close the port suddenly and keep it closed pending repairs. Most typically, the damage was due to a storm or a collision, but not always. In the morning of 29 April 1907, during calm weather, a 260 foot long section of Bulli Jetty collapsed, without warning, taking 15 coal wagons and 150 tons of coal with it into the sea. The sixty-miler, Governor Blackall, was alongside the northern side of the jetty and loading coal at the time, but was not damaged, because the structure tilted southward as it collapsed. The collapse and subsequent further storm damage, less than two months later, kept the jetty out of action for nearly two years. After repairs, the jetty was again badly damaged in a storm, in mid 1912, and it took until late 1913 for it to resume operation. Another cause of damage to jetties was fire.

Loading at the ocean jetties needed to be fast to minimise the time that the sixty-miler stood alongside the jetty. Sixty-milers loading at ocean jetties needed to remain under steam and ready to depart at short notice should there be a change in the prevailing weather. Sixty-milers sometimes departed without completing all the preparations that were prudent for the safety of ship and crew. There was also no inspection of any recently loaded ship at jetty ports. These were two issues that would arise during the Royal Commission of 1919–1920.

=== Collisions and near misses ===
Woonona—a collier owned by Bulli Coal Company—ran into the schooner Terrigal Packet, which was badly damaged and sank within two minutes, off Fort Macquarie, in 1879. In 1880, Duckenfield carrying 300 tons of coal, collided with the steamer, Glenelg, off Millers Point, and sustained serious damage to her port bow. In 1881, she collided with Boomerang off Nobbys Head. In 1882, two sixty-milers, Saxonia and Woonona, collided in Sydney Harbour. Woonona was badly damaged and needed to be beached in Farm Cove. Later the same year, Woonona had another lucky escape; she was coaling Austral, when that ship rolled over and sank at her moorings at Neutral Bay. The lines that secured Woonona to Austral were cut as Austral began to sink. In 1888, the fully-laden Woonona collided with the steamer Dingadee, off Fort Denison.

Royal Shepherd—built in 1853 as a passenger ship—was being used as a collier in July 1890. At night and heading south to load coal, due east of South Head, she was rammed amidship by another collier, the fully-laden Hesketh, heading north from Bellambi. Her captain and crew of eleven only had around ten minutes to clamber aboard the bow of Hesketh, as the old iron-hulled steamship sank. To complicate matters, Royal Shepherd was towing another vessel, Countess of Errol, which was going to load coal at Wollongong and which narrowly avoided colliding with Hesketh.

In 1896, Merksworth, laden with coal from Catherine Hill Bay and bound for Millers Point, collided with the ferry, Manly, and quickly started to sink. She was steered onto rocks west of the entrance to Mosman Bay, where her stern settled on the bottom in eight fathoms. She was refloated and repaired, returning to service and being involved in another collision, with a smaller steamer, Mascotte, in Sydney, in 1897. Merksworth foundered, after being abandoned off Stockton Beach in May 1898, with only three survivors.

In 1899, the sixty-miler schooner, May Byrnes, was involved in a collision with the schooner Whangaroa in Sydney Harbour. The tug, Champion, had the two vessels and another schooner, Hannah Nicholson, in tow. Preparing to make headway under sail and lengthening her towline, May Byrnes was struck by Whangaroa.

Herga had a long life as a sixty-miler, beginning in 1879, with her delivery to her new owner, Coalcliff Collieries—together with her twin, Hilda— and ending with her scrapping in 1928. During that time, she had a remarkable number of collisions. In September 1881, she collided with the Union Steamship Co.'s steamship, Hero, off Fort Denison; holed and leaking badly she needed to rush into shallow water, to prevent her sinking completely. Fault was attributed to both ships. In January 1891, she collided with the schooner, Julia, outside the Sydney Heads. In June 1901, she collided with a schooner, Lady Mabel, inside Sydney Harbour. In April 1915, outbound for Wollongong, she collided with Captain Cook off South Reef in Sydney Harbour. In June 1915, near the Sow and Pigs Reef in Sydney Harbour, she collided with two steamships in one incident, first hitting Soros and then Southborough.

In August 1900, the sixty-miler, Brunner, carrying coal from Newcastle, collided with the Manly paddle-steamer ferry, Brighton, off Georges Head. Both vessels were badly damaged; Brunner at the bow and Brighton amidship. Brunner remained afloat only due to her watertight compartments. After her passengers were taken onto Narrabeen, Brighton had to be beached at Chowder Bay. Fortunately, nobody was injured.

Kelloe sank, two miles off the Botany Bay heads in May 1902, after colliding with the Stone Fleet coastal steamer, Dunmore. Dunmore picked up Kelloe's crew and made it through the heads of Botany Bay, where she was only saved by being beached.

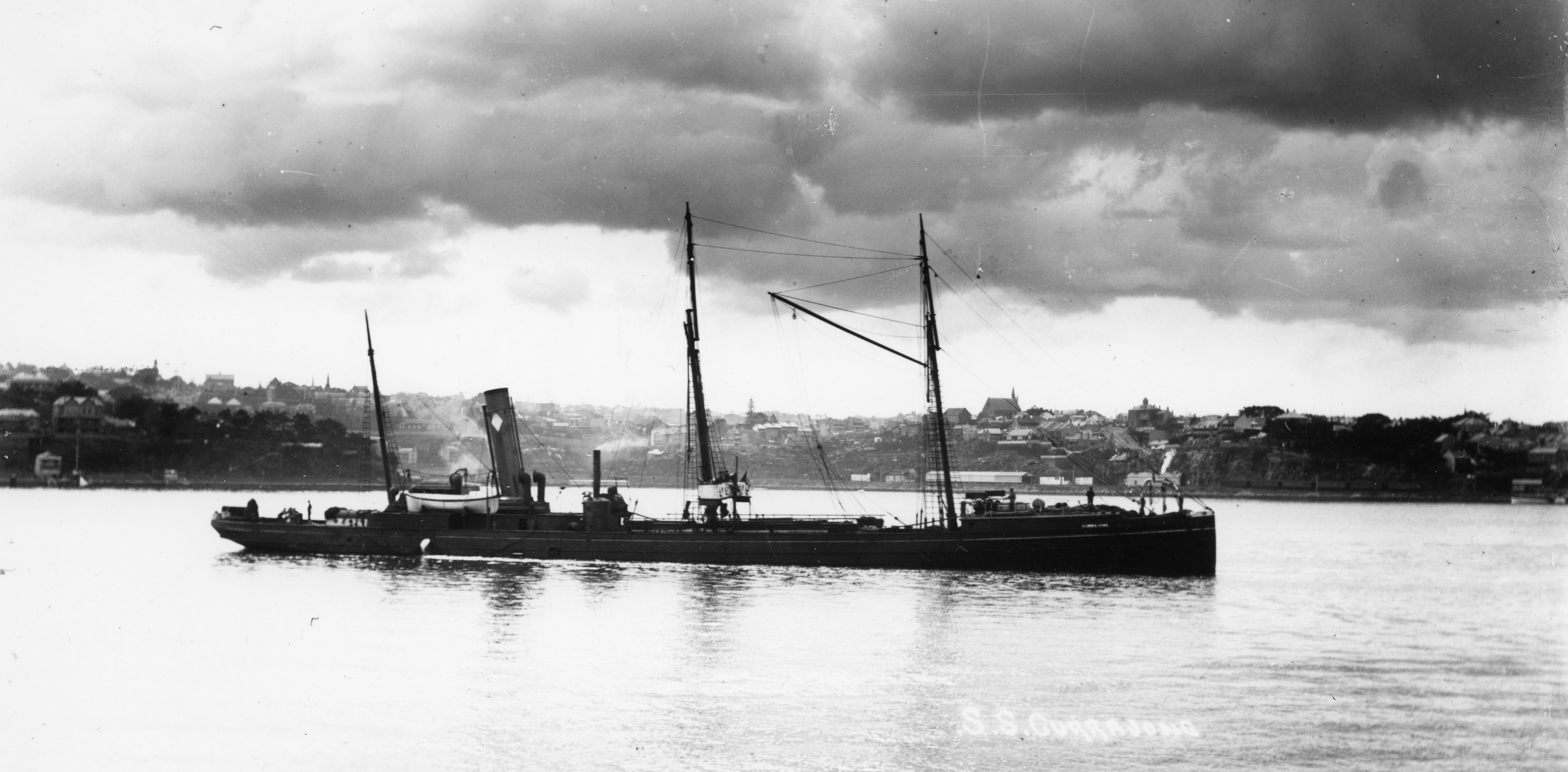
Currajong

In June 1903, Currajong—a sixty miler belonging to Bellambi Coal Co.—collided with the Milsons Point ferry Victoria near Dawes Point. Later, in 1910, Currajong collided again; this time with the steamer, Wyreema, off Bradleys Head, Sydney Harbour. One crewman died, when Currajong sank in the main shipping channel.

In August 1907, a J & A Brown sixty-miler, Alice, collided with a North Coast steamer, Wyoming, in Johnstones Bay, Sydney Harbour.

In October 1911, Derwent collided with the crowded passenger ferry Kaikai, near Milsons Point. Fortunately, there were no deaths. A Marine Court of Enquiry found the master of Derwent to be at fault and suspended his certificate. In February 1903, Derwent had needed to be towed, after a tail shaft failure off Newcastle.

In the early morning of March 1913, off Barrenjoey, Galava collided with a ketch, Alfred Fenning, and kept going without attempting to assist the other vessel. Fortunately the ketch was not seriously damaged and nobody was injured. Another early morning collision between a sixty-miler, Yuloo, and a ketch, Wave, occurred in August 1915, off Long Reef. Blame was attributed to the sixty-miler's master for negligence in not keeping a proper lookout and so not seeing the ketch's lights.

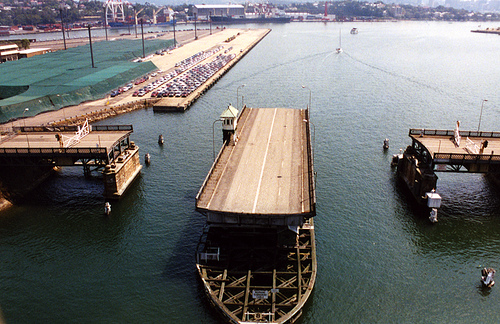
The disused Glebe Island Bridge, in 2006, looking toward the main harbour and showing the two narrow fairways on either side of the swinging section

=== Passing 'swing' bridges ===
Sydney Harbour had three opening bridges that were en route to some of the coal wharves. All were swing bridges. Two of these swing bridges survive in 2022, but only one is in working order; it is now used for pedestrian traffic. Although the openings of the bridges were sufficient for small vessels, such as most sixty-milers, there was little margin for error or mishap, when passing through the fairways; this was complicated still further by the numerous nighttime movements of the sixty-milers, within the confined waters of the harbour and Parramatta River.

In 1896, the ageing iron steamer, Merksworth, collided with the Pyrmont Bridge and was beached near the gasworks wharf at Millers Point. In 1902, the original Pyrmont swing bridge was replaced with a more modern swing bridge. In July 1905, Wallarah, passing the swing opening of the newer Pyrmont Bridge in darkness, collided with the bridge structure, badly damaging the ship.

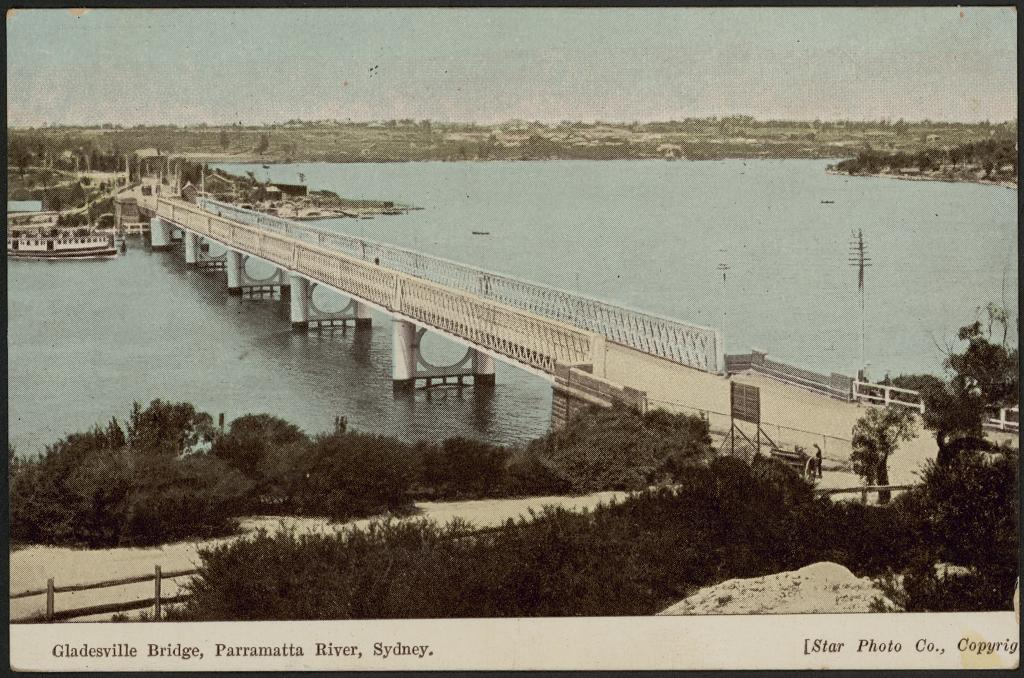
Original (1881) Gladesville Bridge, viewed from the north, with the opening 'swing' span visible at the southern end.

The Glebe Island Bridge, across the mouth of Blackwattle Bay, was the location of four collisions involving sixty-milers, between 1908 and 1950. In March 1908, Derwent was leaving Blackwattle Bay and deviating to avoid some small vessels anchored in the area, when she struck the dolphin protecting the bridge structure. It was only when half-way to Newcastle that a closer inspection found that one of her plates had fractured above the waterline. She returned to Sydney for repair.

In April 1926, Kintore was approaching the Gladesville Bridge, and made a long blast on her steam whistle to have the swinging span of the bridge opened. When she was about halfway through the opening, she encountered another sixty-miler, Duckenfield, heading for the same opening, in the opposite direction bound for the gasworks at Mortlake. Kintore put her engine into reverse, but the two ships collided.

=== Shallow water ===
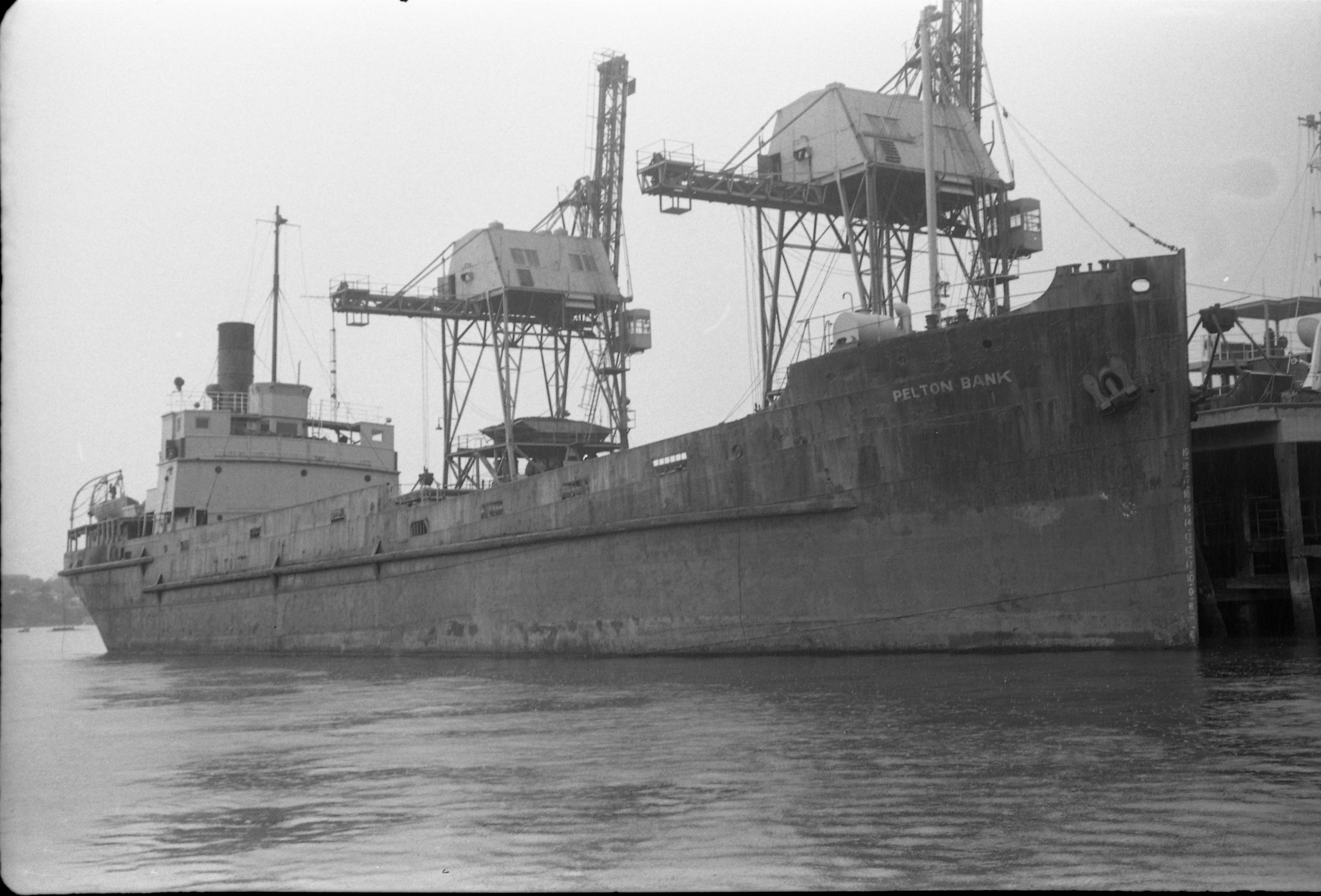
Pelton Bank at the Mortlake Gasworks, March 1968

Groundings at low speed on a sandbank or mudbank were a hazard of working the Hunter River (Hexham in particular), Mortlake on the Parramatta River, and the other shallow water ports, Botany Pier and Lake Macquarie. Such groundings usually—but not always—had no serious consequences, other than lost time and the cost of towing or refloating the vessel.

Ships made use of the tides to avoid running aground in shallow Fern Bay, when laden with coal and heading downstream from the tidal Hunter River port of Hexham to the sea. The river needed dredging, particularly after major floods—like those in 1949, August 1952 and February 1955—that deposited large volumes of sediment. Even so, sixty-milers occasionally ran aground on Hunter River mudbanks and needed to be towed off or refloated on a higher tide. Those running aground in the Hunter included, Pelaw Main in 1918, Malachite in 1926, Minmi in 1930, Pelaw Main in 1931, 1946, 1948, and 1953, Pelton Bank in 1936 and 1939, Hetton Bank in 1948, during a fog, and in 1950, and, in 1952, Ayrfield, which went aground on a mudflat near Stockton after loading at the Dyke.

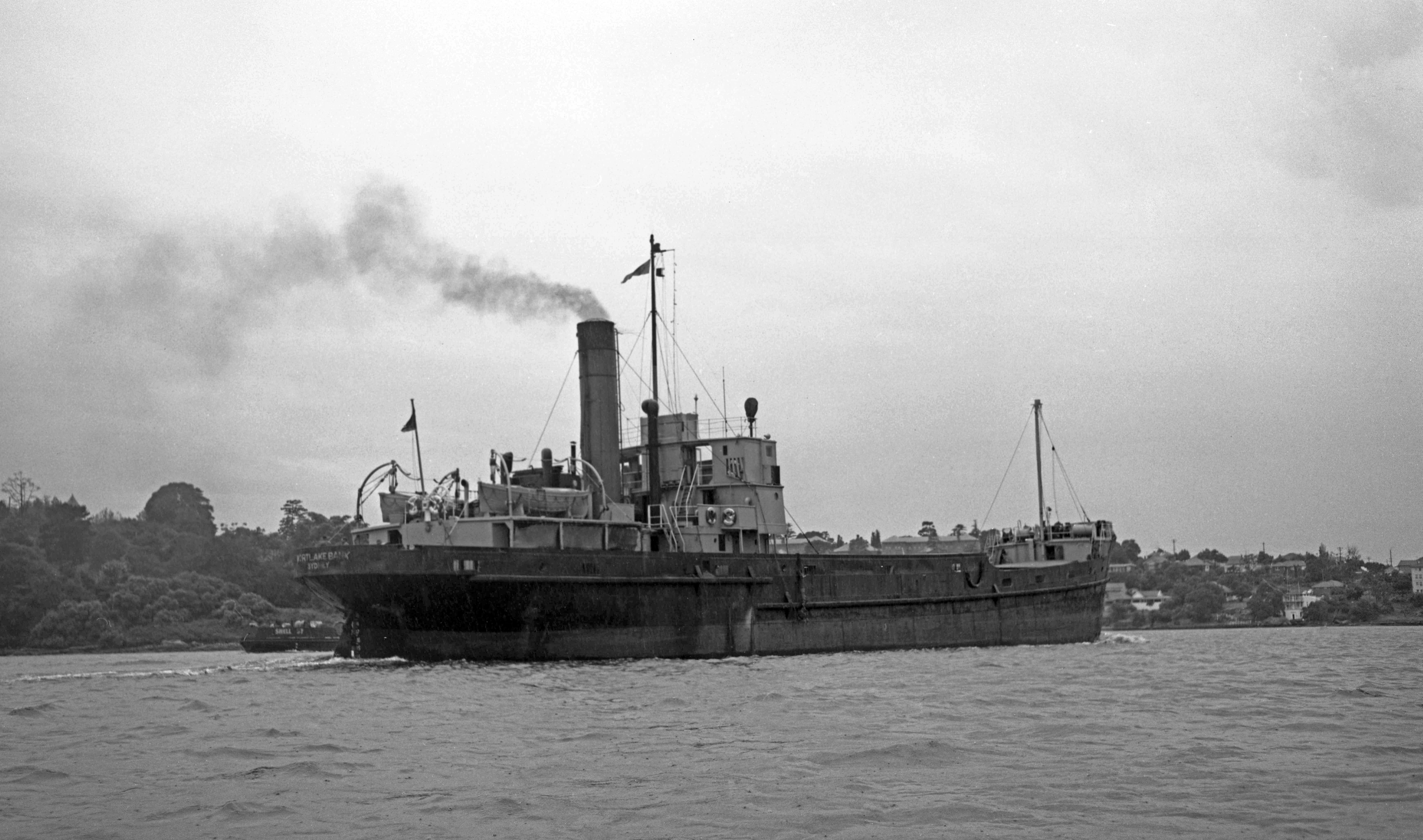
Mortlake Bank on Sydney Harbour, March 1968

Four sixty-milers that serviced the Mortlake gasworks ran aground in the Parramatta River. In 1906 during a fog, Duckenfield ran aground near Abbotsford. In 1930, Pelaw Main coming from Hexham went aground near Cabarita—but for the heavy fog she was within sight of her destination—when she anchored in shallow water and the tide then went out. Hetton Bank ran aground near Cabarita in 1935 and again near Henley wharf in 1936 Mortlake Bank ran aground at Huntleys Point—after colliding with a moored yacht and demolishing a navigation beacon—in 1938. Mortlake Bank came to rest with its side towering over nearby waterfront houses.

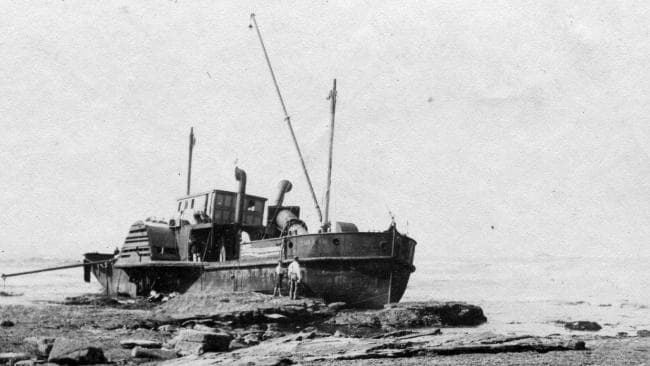
Euroka on Long Reef in 1913.

Groundings in Lake Macquarie or its entrance resulted in two sixty milers being lost, after the ships continued into the open sea. In 1913, Euroka, a small iron paddle steamer, loaded coal at Belmont and then ran aground at Pelican Island—a small island in Lake Macquarie—and had to be unloaded to continue. The ship grounded again near the pilot station anchorage near Swansea but was not taking water. She continued her voyage out to sea on 19 October 1913 but started taking water. She was coping until south of Broken Bay, where her engine stopped due to the condenser being clogged with sand. She was abandoned off the northern beaches of Sydney, and she washed up on Long Reef before she could be salvaged. A leak caused by striking the bank of the Swansea Channel resulted in a wooden sixty-miler, Commonwealth, foundering off Terrigal in August 1916.

As late as 1938, Himitangi—at 479 gross tonnage a relatively large vessel to use within Lake Macquarie—ran aground on a sandbank inside the lake a quarter of a mile from the entrance, while departing for Sydney with a cargo of coal.

At the time that the Botany Pier (or 'Long Pier') on Botany Bay was in use, that part of the bay had sandbanks. The sixty-miler Yuloo ran aground near there in 1914, after apparently missing the channel. Bealiba, coming from Catherine Hill Bay, ran aground on a shoal in 1929. In 1919, Audrey D also ran aground in Botany Bay.

=== Bad weather and heavy seas ===
The prevailing weather and sea conditions were a contributing factor in numerous losses and, in some cases, the main reason for the loss of lives and ships. The violent storms known as 'black nor'easters' were particularly dangerous to sailing vessels. Storms known as 'east-coast lows' were a danger to ships, even well away from the coastline. Even in relatively benign conditions, a sudden wind change or an unexpected large wave could place the little ships in jeopardy.

Caroline, a coastal cargo schooner of only 127 tons, was carrying coal from Newcastle to Sydney, when last seen near Broken Bay, during a gale in July 1860. She disappeared suddenly, and was presumed to have gone down. The lives of all on board were lost, including the captain-owner's wife and child, who were passengers.

In July 1877, the paddle steamer, Yarra Yarra, left Newcastle, with 500 tons of coal bound for Sydney. The weather deteriorated and she was forced to return to Newcastle early next morning. By then, the harbour was no longer safe; huge waves were breaking across the entire entrance. Near to the notorious Oyster Bank, just north of the river mouth, she appeared to lose steerage and turned broadside to the waves, after which a tremendous wave struck, carrying away the foremast. Yarra Yarra heeled over and sank by the stern. Her crew of eighteen all died.

Woniora had been the first steamship to carry coal from Hexham, in 1862. She foundered off the entrance to Botany Bay, en route from Bulli to Sydney on 28 October 1882, with only one survivor. A Court of Marine inquiry found the likely reason was her carrying more coal and going too fast than was appropriate for the stormy conditions.

In January 1898, a brig, Minora, carrying coal from Newcastle to Sydney had foundered off Broken Bay, after unexpectedly shipping two large waves. The ship sank in less than five minutes, leaving no time to launch the boats. Nonetheless, all her crew of seven survived the sinking, by clinging to wreckage, but were not rescued by a passing steamer, Tangier, during the night, and subsequently all but one died. Her captain, William Gallant, was the sole survivor; he was in the water for nearly 24-hours before being rescued.

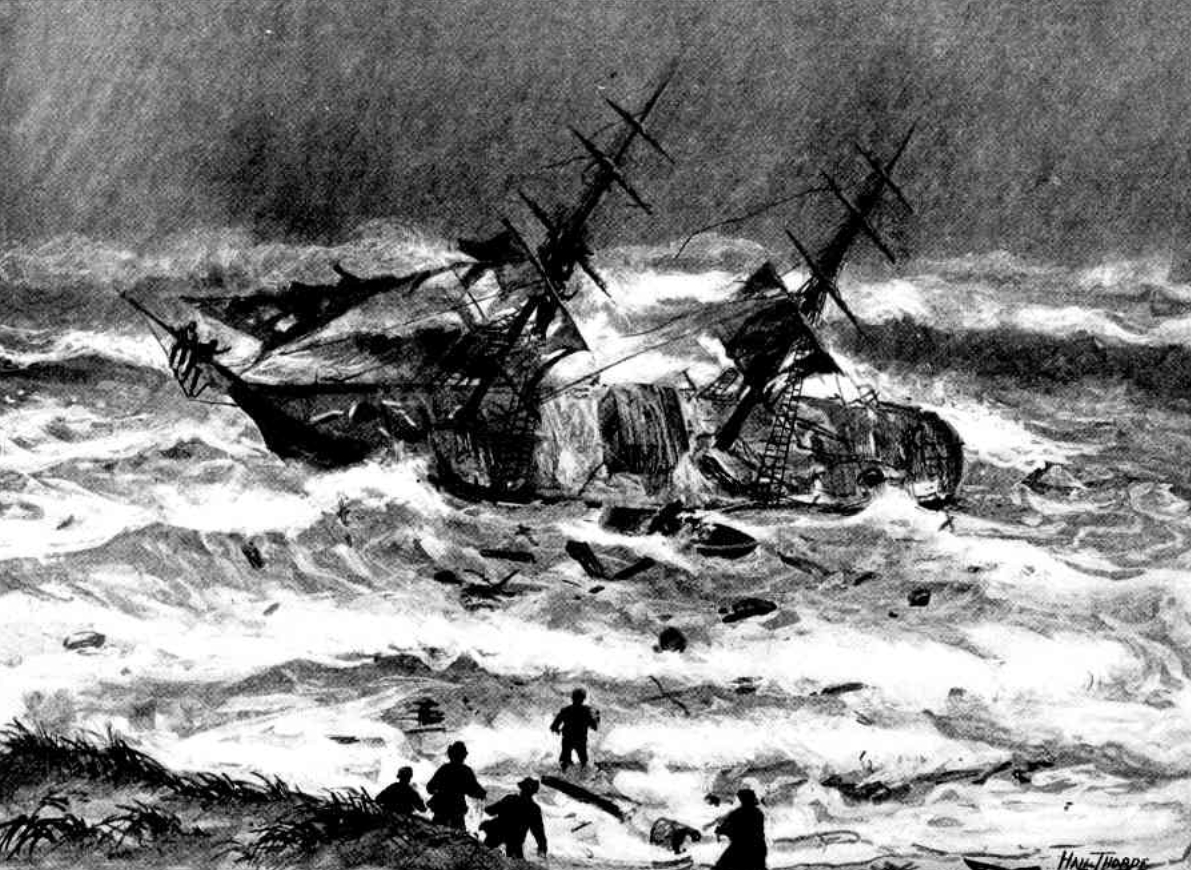
Wreck of Amy.

In 1896, the brig, Amy, had survived going aground, at Cronulla, while carrying coal from Wollongong to Botany. In February 1898, Amy, again carrying coal from Wollongong, was unable to beat away from the coastline during a ferocious south-easterly gale. She went aground and was wrecked, on a sandbar just off Thirroul Beach. Although the crew appear to have survived the grounding, they could not be rescued and all those aboard her died.

The same gale that claimed Amy destroyed the Bellambi Coal Co.'s jetty. Another small ship carrying coal from Wollongong, Malcolm, went down with all hands. and a small coastal auxiliary steamer, Marion Fenwick, went ashore and was wrecked on a rock shelf near Marley Beach, but without loss of life.

In July 1904, the interstate collier, Nemesis, was carrying a cargo of coal and coke from Newcastle to Melbourne, but encountered a fierce gale. Nemesis was last seen by another ship, Marloo, 10 miles off Coalcliff, heading south against the wind at only one knot, but seemingly not in trouble. Later, some rockets were fired, as a signal that the ship was in distress. The ship and all 32 of her crew were lost. Some wreckage washed ashore, around Cronulla Beach, as did the bodies of some of her crew. More wreckage was also found south of Jibbon Point, to the south of Port Hacking, and a spar believed to be from the ship was seen floating 20 miles off Sydney Heads. The nature of the wreckage attested to the ferocity of the storm. The master of Marloo gave evidence to a Marine Court that, "It was the worst sea he ever saw. The seas came from three directions, met in a pinnacle, and exploded like a cannon."

In September 1905, Jones Brothers, a topsail schooner owned by the coal merchants of the same name, was wrecked on the Oyster Bank at the entrance to the Hunter River. She had been laden with coal and in tow, by another Jones Brothers ship, the steam collier Helen Nicholl, but high seas led to an attempt to return to Newcastle, in the early hours of the morning. Helen Nicholl narrowly survived, returning to sea, but the schooner was lost with all seven of her crew.

Herga had a narrow escape, in April 1914. Struck by a violent gale as she approached Sydney, she was buffeted by the large waves. An unusually large wave broke through the skylights of her engine room and stokehold, flooding them and disabling her engine. The prevailing weather caused her to drift southward and away from the rocky coastline; her engineers were then able to restore the engine to service, allowing her to complete the trip under her own power.

=== Change of wind ===
Changes in wind strength and direction were a hazard for sixty milers that were sailing vessels, particularly when entering or leaving ports.

The schooner, Lady Emma, was leaving Sydney for Newcastle, in April 1880, when the wind suddenly dropped, leaving her becalmed near North Head. She drifted onto the rocks, where she was wrecked. Her crew were rescued, with the sole exception of her master, who perished.

The ship that replaced Minora on the Newcastle-Sydney run, the schooner May Byrnes, was caught by a sudden change of wind direction, while entering Port Jackson, and was wrecked on North Head, in February 1901; all her crew survived.

North Head seemed to be a dangerous location for sailing vessels; the pilot boat rescued the brig Amy—the vessel bought to replace Lady Emma—and the topsail schooner, Jones Brothers, (twice) there.

=== Off-course and aground ===
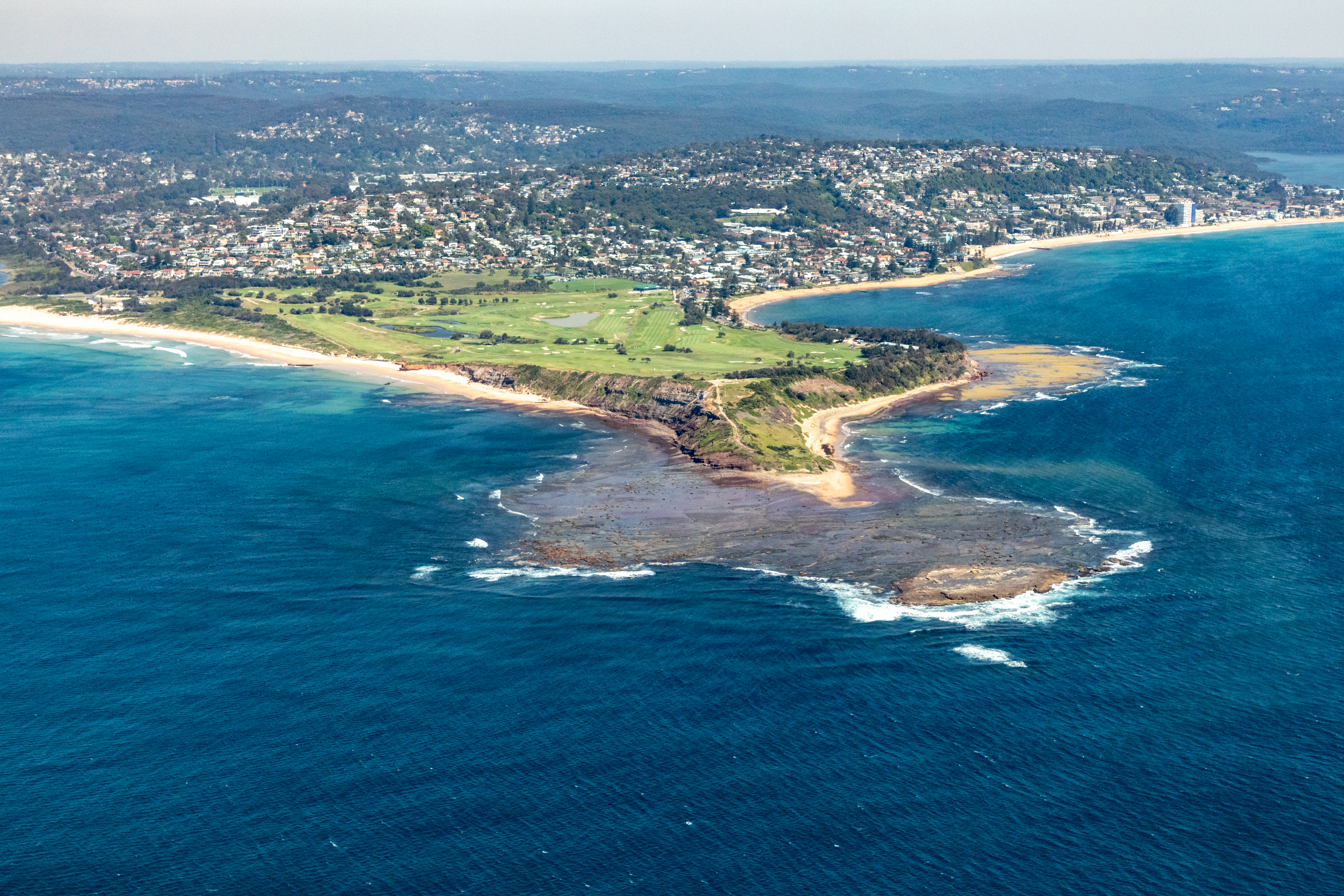
Long Reef headland (2019)

Going off-course at sea and grounding with little or no warning caused the loss of many sixty-milers over the years of the coastal coal trade. The little ships set courses close to the coast, but straying too close, usually unknowingly, put the ships at risk of striking dangerous reefs or running aground where the direction of the coastline changed.

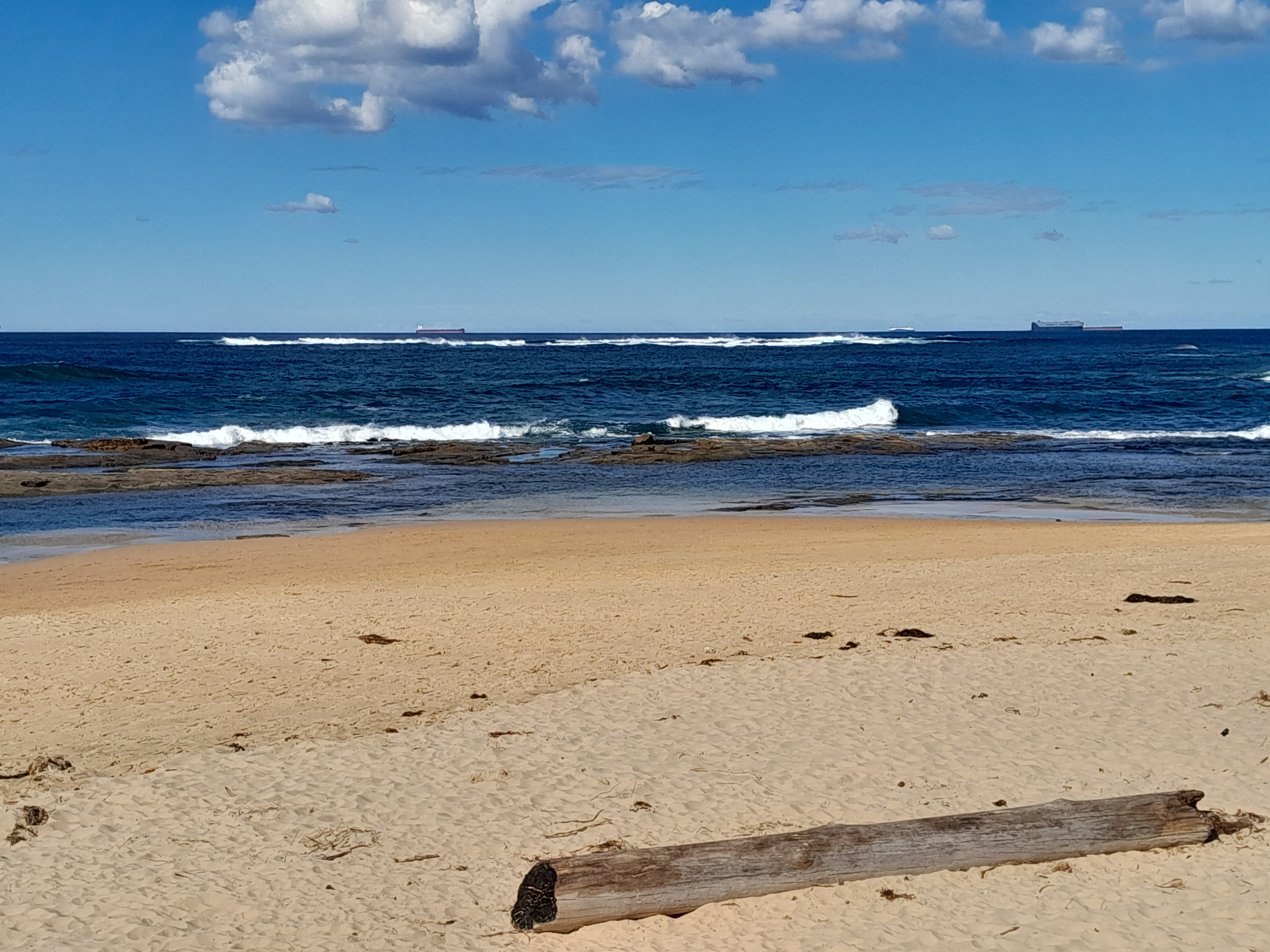
Waves breaking over submerged Bellambi Reef, viewed from the beach immediately south of Bellambi Point.

In 1875, bound for Sydney from Catherine Hill Bay, on a calm but dark and foggy night, the 178 ton three-mast, single-screw 'auxiliary steamer', Susannah Cuthbert, ran aground at Long Reef. An iron scraper had been left close to the binnacle and had deflected the compass needle, resulting in her following an incorrect heading that took the sixty-miler onto the reef. Land was sighted just before the grounding and the engine put to full astern, but too late. The engine was disabled by the grounding and she swung around, broadside to the reef. As the tide rose, she broke up. The crew escaped, some swimming to safety from a capsized boat. The captain was held responsible; he had proceeded toward Sydney, without being able to sight the South Head Light, which should have been an indication that the vessel was too close to land.

The Woniora—an 'auxiliary steamer' with three masts for sails—found itself aground on south-facing Bondi Beach on the night of 8 June 1880. After jettisoning 100-tons of coal, she was towed off and was able to continue to port. Later in 1880, Merksworth, outbound from Sydney, kept too close to the tip of South Head and struck the South Reef, a shelf of submerged rocks near the Hornby Light. Taking water, she was beached at Watsons Bay.

In 1882, Llewellyn, an 'auxiliary steamer' was on her way to Wollongong from Sydney but—unknowingly—steaming too close to the coast, when it struck the reef at Bellambi. Her crew and the three passengers were saved but the vessel broke up and was a total loss.

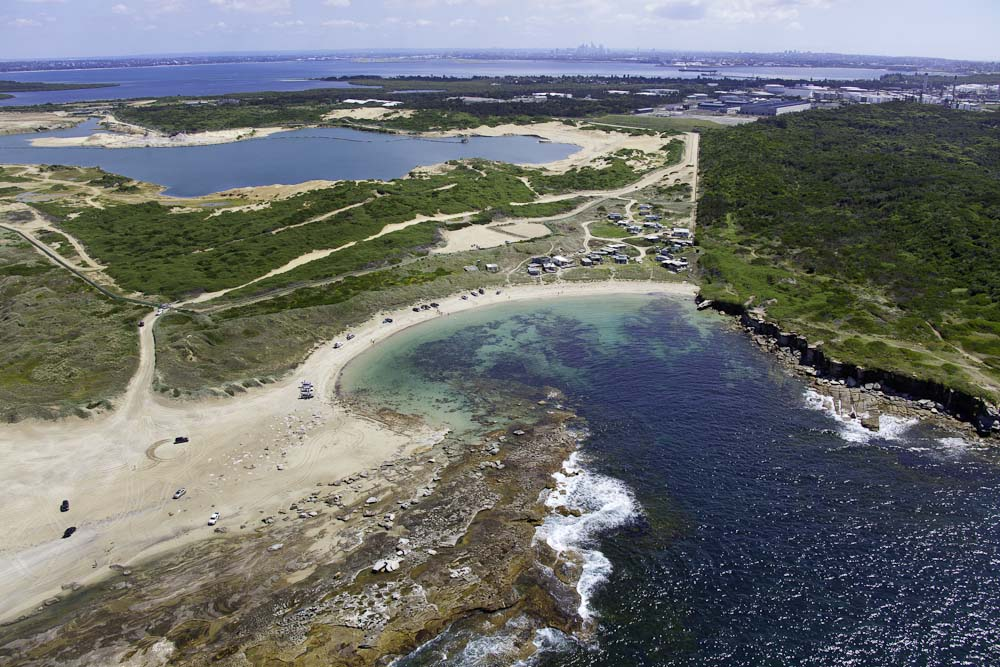
Boat Harbour, with the sheltered waters of Botany Bay in the background. The reef known as 'The Merries' extends south-west from the rock platform on the left. Before the construction of the Cape Baily Light, at least three ships struck 'The Merries' reef, another ran aground to the east of Boat Harbour and another stuck rocks at the base of a sea cliff further north near Cape Baily.

The first sixty-miler called Duckenfield was en route from Newcastle to Sydney and steaming too close to the coast, when it struck Long Reef in 1889 and sank. In 1913, Euroka, a small iron paddle steamer carrying coal from Lake Macquarie to Sydney, having been abandoned by her crew, washed up on Long Reef and was wrecked.

In perfect weather, Hilda went onto the rocks near the southern side of the entrance to Botany Bay on 19 July 1893. Her captain had left the helm in the hands of a seaman and gone below around 1 a.m., when the ship passed Cronulla. By the time that the captain returned, the ship was close to striking the rocks at the base of a sandstone cliff and he ordered her engines to be reversed. Hilda struck the rocks but, under reverse power, came off the rocks almost immediately. She had been damaged and sank within two minutes after her crew abandoned the ship. The crew rowed to safety in Botany Bay and then walked to Sydney.

In August 1895, the schooner Norman, carrying a cargo of 81 tons coal from Wollongong, ran onto the easternmost point of Bellambi Reef. Her crew were picked up by Dunmore. Although a tug was sent to try and retrieve the schooner, by the same afternoon, the combination of a gale and low water made such an attempt impossible. Norman quickly broke up, becoming another victim of the notorious reef.

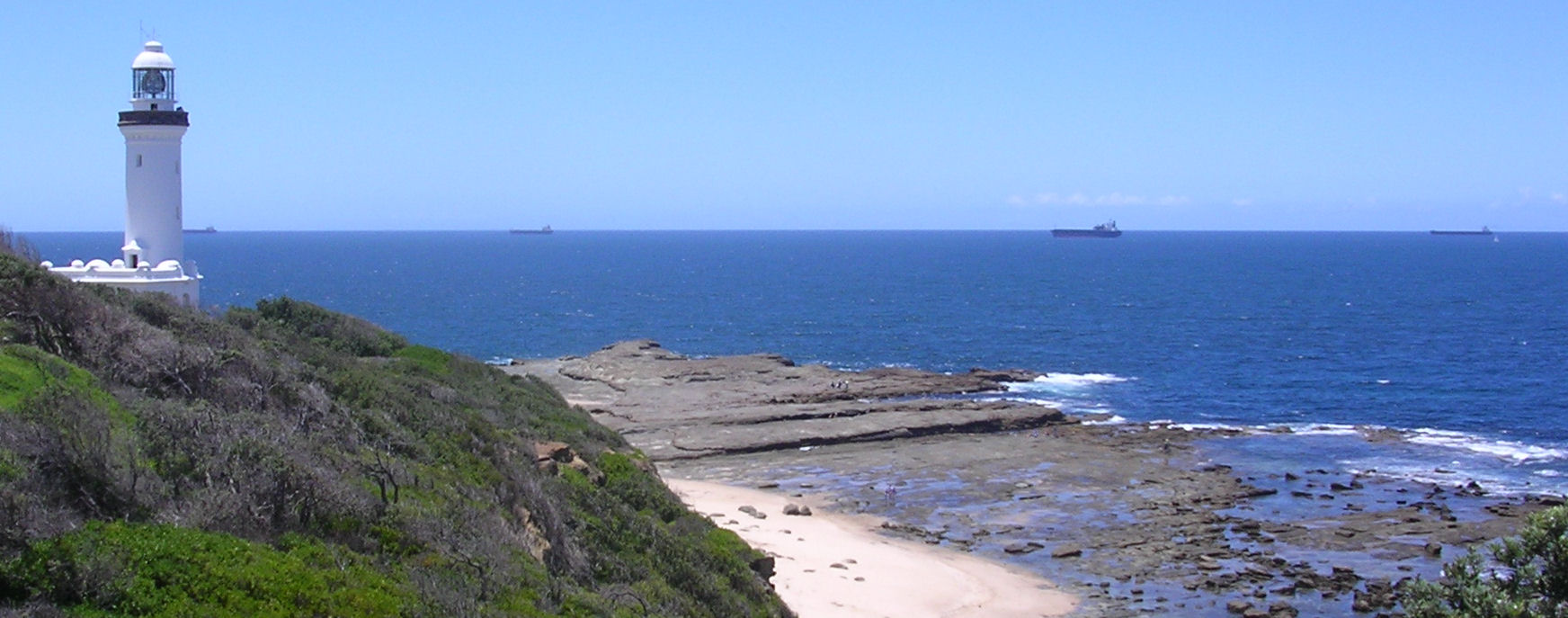
Norah Head and its lighthouse.

On 24 March 1905, the Bellambi Coal Company's sixty-miler, Marjorie, ran aground—at night and at high tide—on the reef known as "The Merries", at the north end of "Cronulla beach"—actually north of Wanda Beach on Bate Bay. Fishermen at the nearby locality of Boat Harbour were surprised to see a ship heading straight for the land but their attempts to alert the ship failed. The ship was stranded but not taking water; it could not free itself by putting its engine in reverse. By low water, it was possible to walk almost all the way around the vessel on the rocks. Fortunately, the sea was exceptionally calm and the ship sat on the rocks "as if in a dock". Four gangs of 'coal lumpers' were brought, by the sixty-miler Bellambi, to jettison the cargo manually, to lighten the ship for refloating. She was floated off but had some damage.

Colo was en route from Catherine Hill Bay to Shea's Creek on Botany Bay, with defective steering gear, when she bumped over submerged rocks between Norah Head and the entrance of Tuggerah Lake, at 2:30 a.m. on 20 October 1906, and then drifted broadside onto the beach. Her crew was taken off by a passing sixty-miler, Alice, but the ship was lodged fast, submerged at the stern. Salvage operations were able to recover machinery from the ship including its boiler.

In March 1909, Wallsend bound for Wollongong, ran onto Bellambi Reef, during a rain squall. Putting the engines into reverse stripped the blades from her propeller, and most of the crew abandoned the ship. When the tide rose, the ship floated off by herself, with only her captain and mate aboard; the other crew then reboarded the ship. She was not making more water than the pumps could handle, but her propeller was destroyed and her bottom plates crumpled and extensively damaged. She was towed to Sydney. There were differing accounts of whether or not the Wollongong light could be seen—indicating a safe distance from the reef—when the ship struck the reef.

In January 1912, Mount Kembla, owned by Mount Kembla Coal & Oil Company was bound for Wollongong. At night and under the control of her chief officer, she ran into Bellambi Reef. She had been able to reverse her engine, struck the reef gently, and was not making water. After two and a half hours being stranded, she floated off on the rising tide, and continued to Wollongong. She took on a cargo of coal for Sydney. Once at that port, a survey found some damaged plates. Also bound for Wollongong, in March 1916, Herga too hit Bellambi Reef; she was extensively damaged and lost one propeller blade, but was not leaking and was able to return to port.

=== Equipment failure ===
Duckenfield was lying, at Hexham, when a water valve on its boiler blew off, on 28 August 1902. Two men were killed by escaping steam.

On 24 February 1917, a wooden sixty-miler, Yambacoona, was steaming toward Sydney within "200 to 300-feet" of Broken Head (at Terrigal, NSW)—an inquiry later found this far too close to land for safety—when the key came out of a pinion wheel in her steering gear. Her wheel could then spin freely with no effect on the rudder. Although the captain put her engines into reverse, she ran hard against the rocks at the Skillion. The ship was holed and soon sank but the entire crew were able to get away in a boat.

=== Royal Commission of 1919–1920 ===
The six-month period from December 1918 to May 1919 saw the loss of three sixty-milers, Tuggerah (owned by Wallarah Colliery), Undola (owned by Coalcliff Collery), and Myola (owned by Howard Smith). There were survivors from Tuggerah and Myola. Undola had been lost with all hands, her fate unknown. In preceding years another three sixty-milers had been lost—Wallarah (in 1914), Commonwealth (in 1916), and Yambacoona (in 1917). Pressure from the Seamen's Union and others led to the establishment of a Royal Commission of Inquiry.

The Royal Commission of Inquiry into the Design, Construction, Management, Equipment, Manning, Leading, Navigation and Running of the Vessels Engaged in the Coastal Coal-carrying Trade in New South Wales and into the Cause or Causes of the Loss of the Colliers Undola, Myola and Tuggerah, sat for 29-days in 1919-1920 and called 123 witnesses. The Commissioners also inspected eighteen ships—including two under 80-tons—and the loading facilities at Catherine Hill Bay, Hexham, The Dyke (Newcastle), Bulli, Bellambi, Wollongong and Port Kembla.

Evidence was given at the Royal Commission that sixty-milers sometimes went to sea without properly trimming the coal first—resulting in a list to one side—and with the hatches off or not properly secured with tarpaulins. The Royal Commission found that both Tuggerah and Undola had departed, with all hatch covers off to allow the coal to be trimmed.

In the case of Tuggerah, at the time that the ship foundered, covers on one hatch were in place but had yet to be secured with tarpaulins and the other hatch was open to allow the coal to be trimmed. The ship had taken a sudden lurch to port—the lee side—and a large sea came over the port rail, filling the well deck. This was followed by more seas in quick succession and the ship then turned over and sank. The Royal Commission's finding on Tuggerah was that, "The cause of the sinking was undoubtedly water entering through open hatches."

The Royal Commission could not establish the cause of the loss of Undola. It established that the ship was in seaworthy condition and stable. The nature of the flotsam washed ashore inclined the Royal Commission to the view that the ship had struck a German mine. The wrecks of the three ships were not found on the sea floor until many years later. When the wreck of Undola was found, she was sitting upright on the seabed, with her hull largely intact, and it is more likely that Undola had foundered and not been sunk by a mine. However, the true circumstances of her sinking can never be known. From what remains of her wreck, it is not possible to know if the hatch covers were in place by the time that she sank. It is known that, before she left Bulli—with both hatches open—the weather had changed, due to a Southerly Buster, and there were 44 mph (71 km/h) winds and probably a rising sea, diminishing the chance that her crew could survive the sinking, and none of them did.

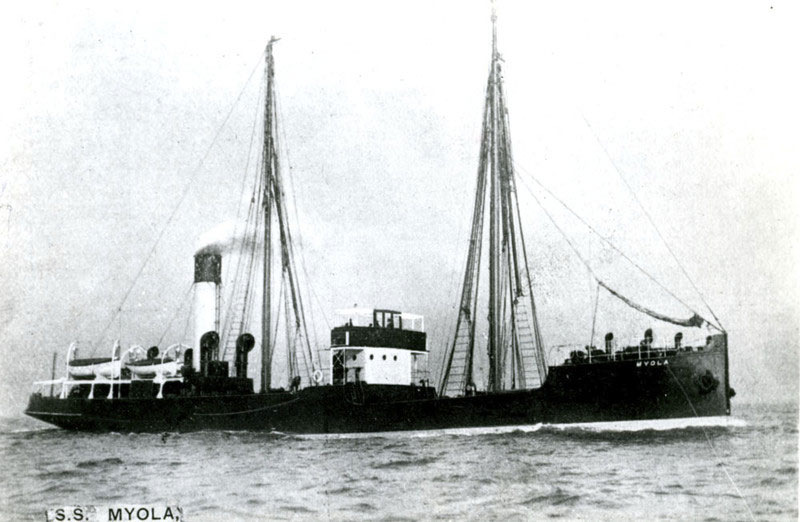
SS Myola

The Royal Commission's finding on the loss of Myola, differed from that of an earlier inquiry. It rejected 'shifting coal' as the cause of the loss and found that the amount of water in the bilges was not significant. Evidence was given that the Myola, had "free water" in her ballast tanks when she had left Newcastle. The Royal Commission found that this had played a critical role by making the ship unstable by reducing her righting levers. It was unable to explain the presence of this water—the crew believed that the ballast tanks were empty—but found it possible that the filling valves were not properly screwed down.

Regarding the design of the ships, the Royal Commission found that the design was suitable. Relying upon calculations of a naval architect, the Royal Commission found that both Undola and Myola—if properly handled—were stable. It did not have enough evidence available to make a finding upon the stability of Tuggerah.

The Royal Commission also noted that ships were inspected prior to sailing at only three ports—Newcastle, Lake Macquarie and Wollongong—and even not always at those ports. They also identified that there was no regulation preventing a ship from leaving port pending such an inspection. The Undola had sailed from Bellambi and Tuggerah from Bulli, both ocean jetty ports at which inspections never took place. The inspection of Myola had not prevented her sailing from Newcastle—despite having a list when she left the wharf—nor had it identified that the ship was overloaded (due to having some free-water in her ballast tanks), which had made her unstable.

The Royal Commission found that the regulations against overloading—not submerging the load-line—were not well promulgated or understood, and were being interpreted by some as not submerging the load-line on just one side of the ship. It found that there had been only two prosecutions for overloading in the previous five years. Moreover, overloading, even when prosecuted, only resulted in a small fine.

The Royal Commission made recommendations concerning the ships, the practices at ports and the legislation covering the coastal coal trade.

=== Later losses and near misses ===
Despite the Royal Commission, its findings and its various recommendations, losses of sixty-milers and the lives of their crew members continued up to 1956. There were also many near misses.

==== Interwar period ====
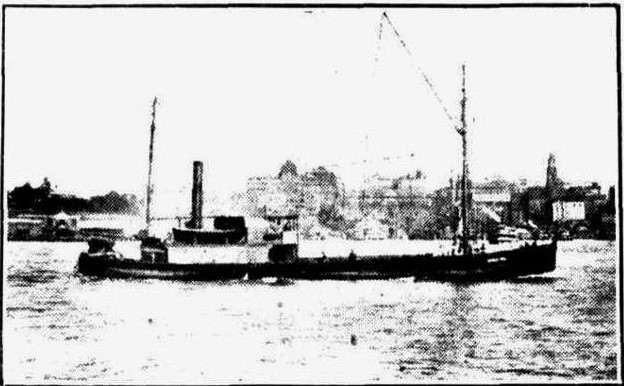
Wooden-hulled sixty-miler, Queen Bee.

In March 1920, a small wooden twin-screw sixty-miler Queen Bee ran over a submerged object off Long Reef, breaking the tailshaft of one of her two propellers. Later in the same year, she collided with Moorabool, near 'The Dyke', and later, in February 1921, also at 'The Dyke', she collided with the full-rigged ship Cumberland. In September 1922, her luck ran out, when she foundered off Broken Bay carrying a load of coal. Her crew all survived after rowing a boat to Palm Beach.

Two sixty-milers, Wallsend and Meeinderry, collided off Redhead, in May 1922. The Meeinderry made it back to Newcastle but sank just inside the breakwater.

Belbowrie escaped serious damage, in June 1923, when she ran aground on a sandy bottom at Doughboy Point—a small rock headland to the east of Boat Harbour—five miles north of Cronulla.

In August 1923, the small wooden sixty-miler, Austral (157 tons), was fortunate to escape almost unharmed, after running aground on the Sow and Pigs Reef, in Sydney Harbour. In April 1924, laden with coal, she foundered off Barrenjoey Head. One life was lost. The survivors rowed for six-hours to reach the shore.

In 1924, in an incident involving two sixty-milers at The Basin, Belbowrie struck Audry D. amidship. Audrey D., in 1935, by then a lighter on Sydney Harbour, caught fire at her moorings in Snail Bay.

In October 1924, the bow of the fully-laden Malachite struck the steel understructure of the eastern stationary part of the Glebe Island Bridge and her mast hit the superstructure; the ship was badly damaged and the bridge structure was displaced by two inches, resulting in the tram rails of the swing and stationary parts of the bridge no longer meeting.

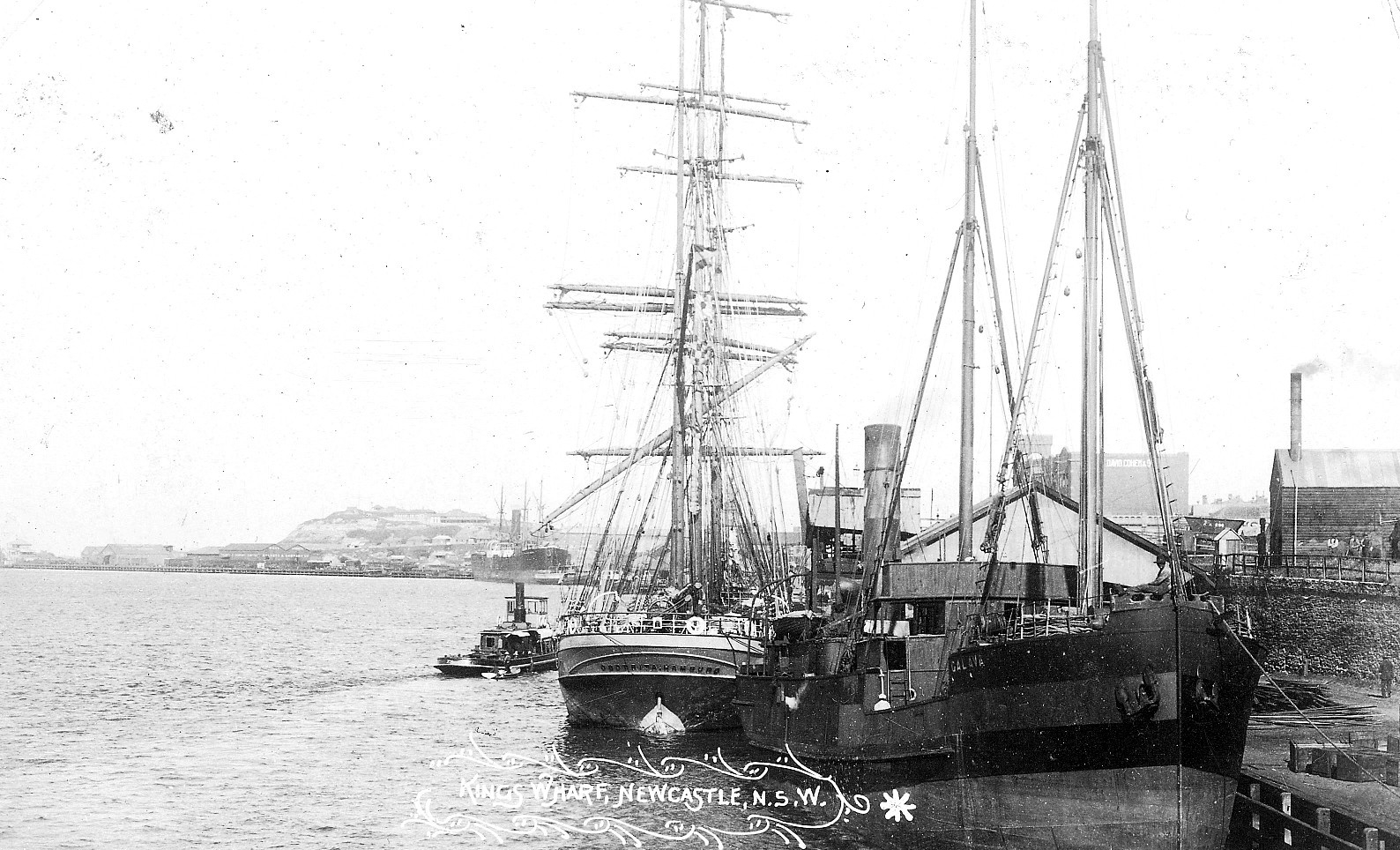
Galava (on right) at Newcastle

In May 1925, Wallsend, while on the wrong side of the channel, collided with the steamer Coombar in Sydney Harbour. In October 1925, Wallsend collided, yet again, with another sixty-miler, Bealiba, at night, off Nobbys Head at the entrance to the Hunter River; both vessels were damaged but were able to return to port.

Galava, was involved in a collision with a schooner being towed by a tugboat, off the Heads, in 1920. She was damaged enough to need to return to Sydney, although the schooner and tug continued on their way to Newcastle. In 1924, she run aground at Cannae Point near the North Head Quarantine Station, while carrying coal bound for the nearby Manly Gasworks wharf; her crew managed to refloat her under her own power. Later, in 1927, en route from Catherine Hill Bay, she foundered off Terrigal, due to water entering the holds through hull plates in the bow; seven of her crew died.

In September 1926, Stockrington headed up the Parramatta River toward Mortlake Gasworks and onto the course of a rowing race near Cabarita wharf. A catastrophe was narrowly averted when the first three scullers managed to pass just ahead of the ship's bow to complete their race. She collided with the wooden piers protecting the structure of the Gladesville Bridge in January 1927. In April 1927, grave fears were held for Stockrington, until she arrived in Sydney—her crew safe but in a state of exhaustion—after having taken 40-hours to complete the trip from Newcastle during a violent gale.

In March 1927, en route for Bulli, Christina Fraser ran over the Jibbon Bombora, off Port Hacking, sustaining serious damage. In May 1927, she collided with the vehicular ferry, Koondooloo, off Fort Macquarie, on Sydney Harbour. Both vessels put their engines into reverse, avoiding a more serious collision, but a glancing blow, against the square corner of the ferry, caused a gaping hole in her hull, fortunately above the waterline. Christina Fraser diverted to Mort's Dock & Engineering Company for repairs. The ferry was able to resume service later the same day, but many years later was wrecked, along with three other ferries, under unusual circumstances, near Trial Bay.

In July 1928, the Malachite—a regular on the Sydney-Newcastle run that had been idle for about five months—was sent to Blackwattle Bay for an overhaul. While berthed alongside the Howard Smith coal wharf, the ship suddenly heeled over and sank, settling on her side. She was refloated, but that was the end of her sea-going days.

In June 1928 during a gale and heavy seas, the small wooden-hulled collier, White Bay, first capsized trying to enter Newcastle and then washed ashore in the Stockton Bight; five lives were lost, with only one survivor. Excelsior, which took the place of White Bay, was damaged by fire while in dry dock in September 1928, Later, in November 1928, Excelsior on a trip from Lake Macquarie sprang a leak. About four miles north of Sydney, the leaking became too much for the bilge pump to remove. She made it into Sydney Harbour and stayed afloat just long enough to be run aground in 12-feet of water at Parsley Bay in the suburb of Vaucluse.

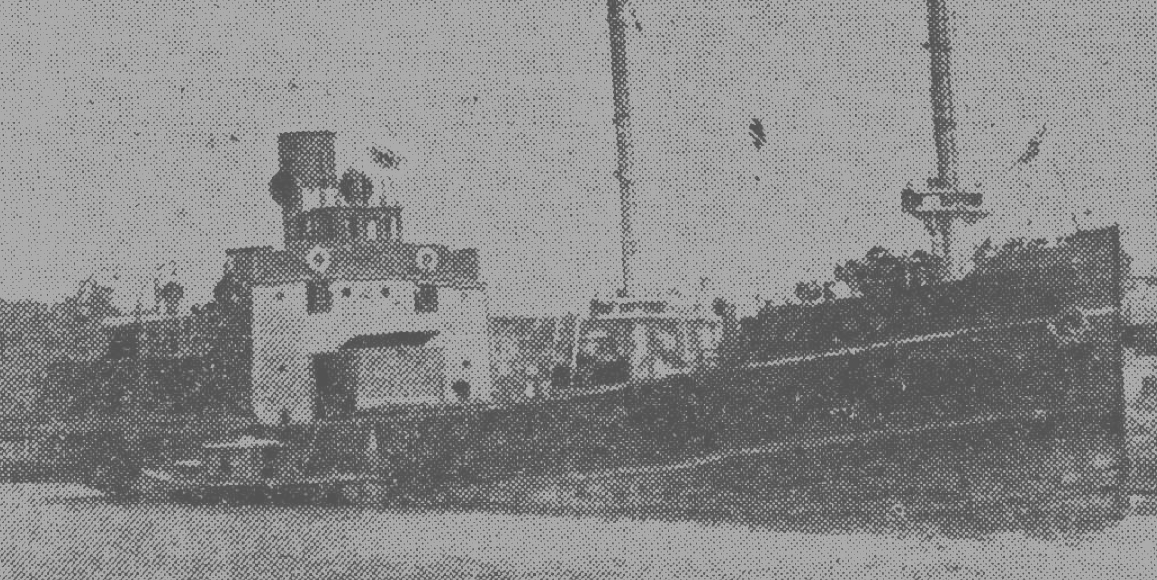
Annie M. Miller - A rare image of a short-lived sixty-miler.

In October 1928, the new RW Miller ship Annie M Miller had limped into Bunbury, on her delivery voyage from Scotland, only by burning bulkhead timber as fuel and with the supply of food for her crew almost depleted. It was an inauspicious beginning to what was her short career in Australia. She sank on 8 February 1929, not long after entering service as a sixty-miler.

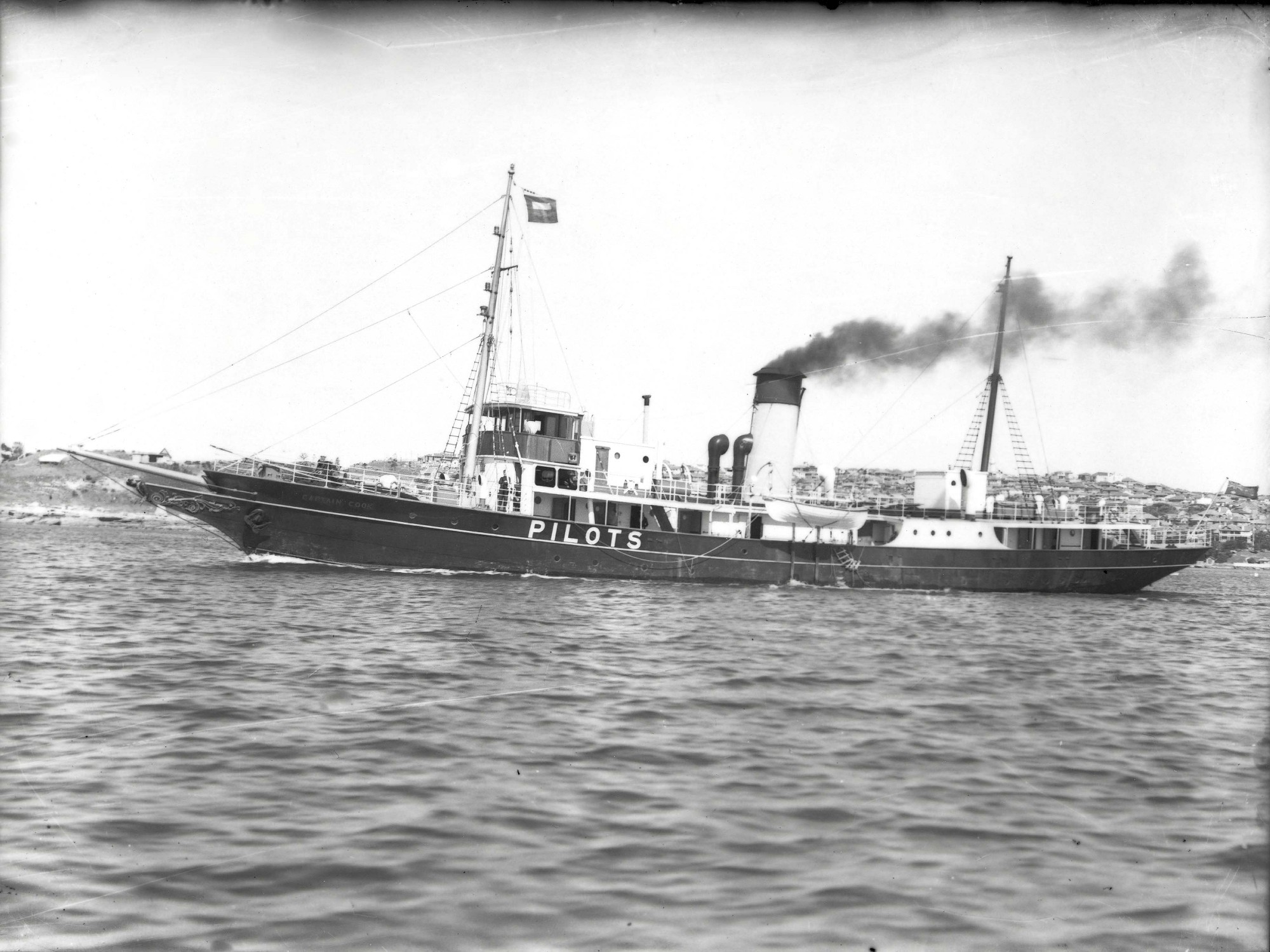
Captain Cook, the pilot boat that, during the night of 8 February 1929, rushed to the aid of the survivors of the crew of Annie M. Miller. A coal-fuelled steam vessel, her operation also relied upon the sixty-milers.

Annie M Miller had loaded coal at Bulli with difficulty, needing to use ballast water balancing to correct a list to port. Her captain ordered the hatches to be put on before departure but not the tarpaulins. The ship left the wharf some time after 2 p.m. in a moderate choppy sea.

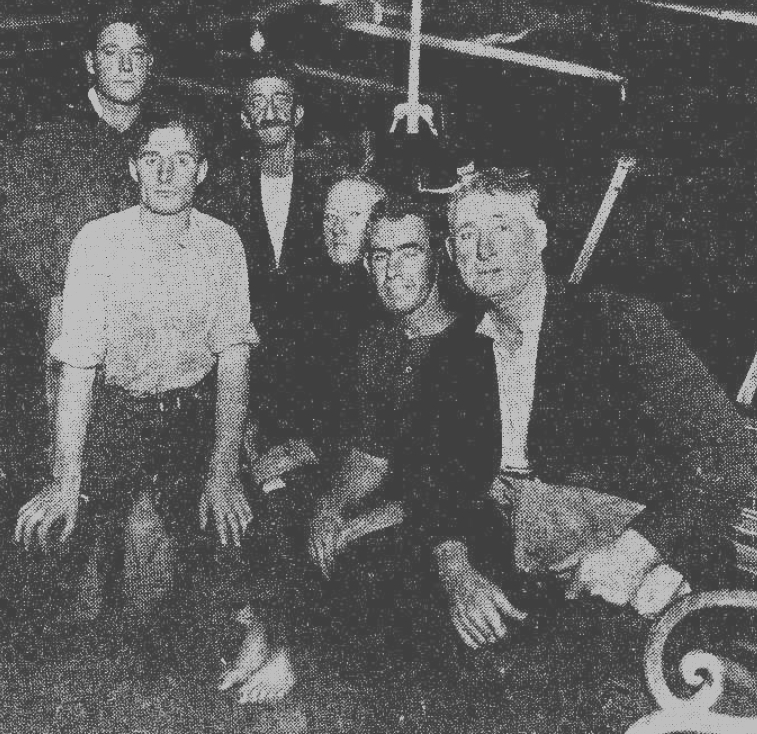
Survivors of the crew of Annie M. Miller, photographed aboard Captain Cook, around the time that the search was abandoned.

Twenty minutes after departure, the list to port returned. A check showed no water in the bilges. Passing Botany Bay, the list was then so bad that two feet of water was lapping number two hatch. Despite this, Captain Pilling continued towards Sydney rather than take shelter in the bay. The list got worse until the port railing was underwater. Captain Pilling ordered lifeboats to be prepared. All of the crew ended up in the water, when the ship foundered off the Macquarie Light, at around 8 p.m. The location was, very fortunately, close to the Sydney Heads, the South Head Signal Station, and the pilot boat wharf at Watsons Bay. Although the ship had no radio, rockets had been fired, which were heard at the signal station. That assisted in the locating of six survivors, who had reached one floating lifeboat; they were picked up by the pilot boat, Captain Cook (1893), within half an hour. The subsequent search, in darkness, for the other lifeboat or any other survivors in the water was unsuccessful. The rescued men landed at Watsons Bay around midnight. Six lost their lives, including Captain Pilling, who was thrown from the bridge into the water, with one of the surviving seamen, when the ship rolled over.

On 5 March 1929, a Court of Marine Inquiry found that Annie M. Miller left Bulli with a decided list to port, caused by improper loading and that she was overloaded by 37 tons. The Inquiry also found that the Captain failed to place the tarpaulins on the hatches. The Inquiry stated that, while it could not definitely come to a conclusion as to the direct cause of the sinking, its opinion was that the improper loading and the failure to place the tarpaulins led to the ship's loss.

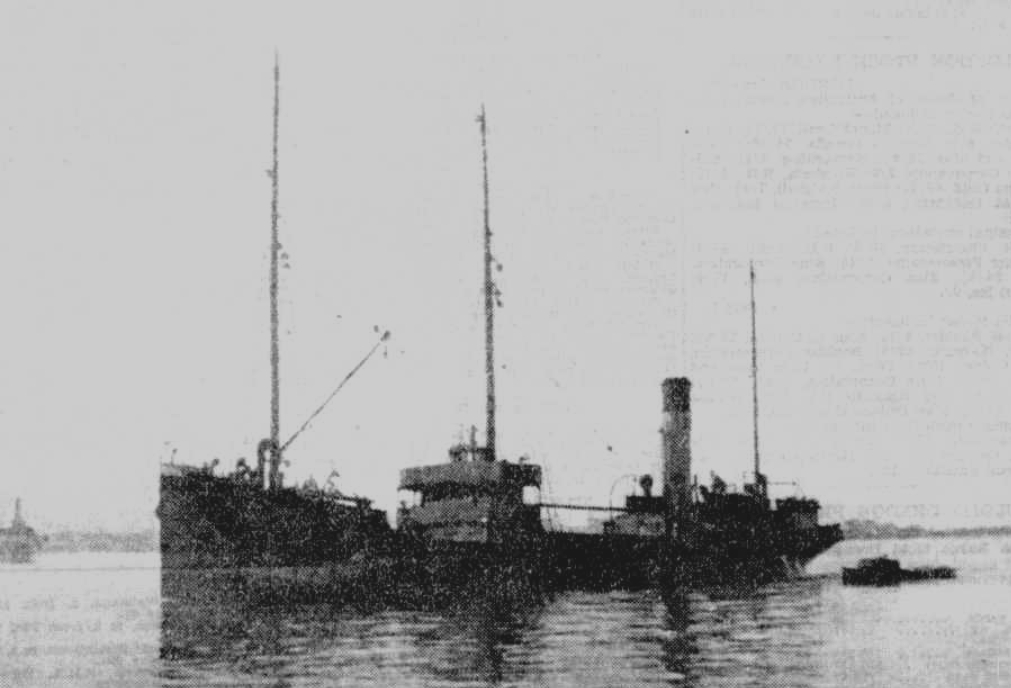
Christina Fraser

In June 1933, only four years after the loss of Annie M. Miller, Bulli was also the last port of call of another R. W. Miller ship, the sixty-miler, Christina Fraser, bound for Geelong on an interstate voyage, after being switched to the interstate trade earlier in 1933. A typical sixty-miler, with a gross tonnage of only 717 tons, she was small for an interstate collier, and conditions would have been cramped for the larger crew needed to cover the multiple shifts of an interstate voyage. At the Marine Court of Inquiry into her loss, evidence was given that Captain Smith had admitted himself that he had on 'dozens of occasions' taken Christina Fraser to sea with her hatches off and while coal was still being trimmed, apparently only doing so to save time. The owners contended that the hatches were put on when the ship left Bulli. The ship had no radio. Conflicting evidence was given concerning her suitability as an interstate ship. She was last seen off Gabo Island on 24 June 1933 during a gale, then—despite an extensive search, and except for some wreckage washed up at Lakes Entrance—Christina Fraser and her crew of seventeen men disappeared without trace.

In May 1932, Abersea (formerly South Bulli), bound from Newcastle to Sydney carrying coal, collided with Tyalgum off Norah Head. Both were damaged but survived the encounter. A Court of Marine Inquiry found errors of judgement by officers of both ships contributed to the collision.

In 1934, Bealiba, on its way to Catherine Hill Bay from Sydney, ran onto rocks at Pelican Point to the south of the Norah Head lighthouse, in a fog. It soon became apparent that her damage was too great to allow her to be refloated. Jones Brothers quickly chartered Kiama to take over her run. Her wreck was sold for £75, and the scrappers were left to get what they could, before she broke up. A Marine Court of Inquiry found both the captain and second officer were negligent in their navigation of the vessel.

In May 1935, the Birchgrove Park collided, with a Manly ferry, Balgowlah, and was holed just above the water line. Balgowlah also collided with another sixty-miler, Himatangi, two years later in August 1937, during a dense fog.

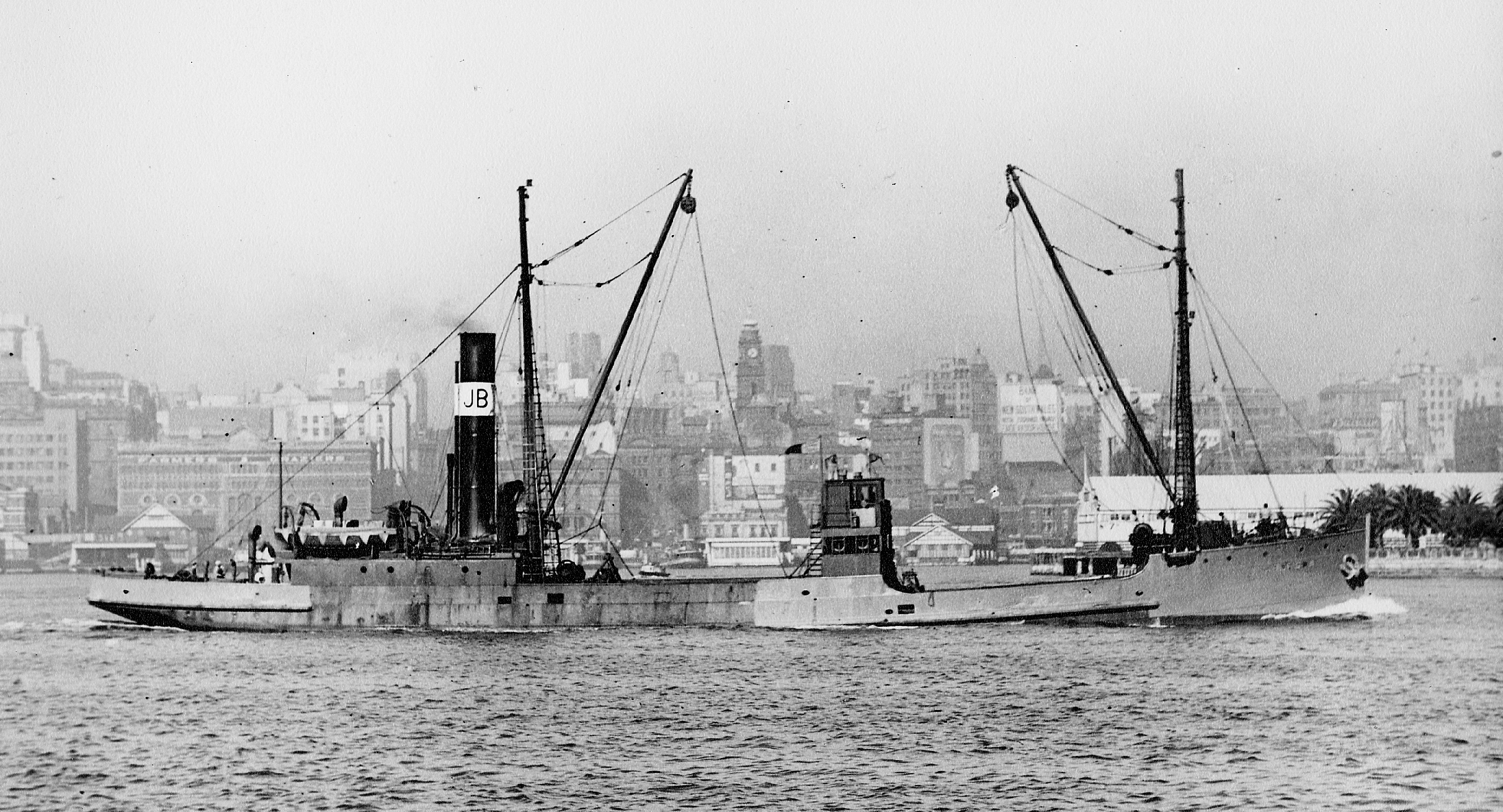
Abersea in 1935

In May 1936, Abersea (formerly South Bulli), en route from Sydney to Wollongong during a southerly gale, stranded on the Bellambi Reef, as a result of a navigation error by her second officer. She was only slightly damaged and was refloated.

In March 1937, a small collier, Hall Caine, en route from Sydney to Lake Macquarie, sprang a leak near Broken Bay. She was taken in tow by another small ship, Idant, but she was taking on water too quickly and started to founder, causing her crew to abandon her. She sank off Terrigal. Her crew were rescued by Idant.

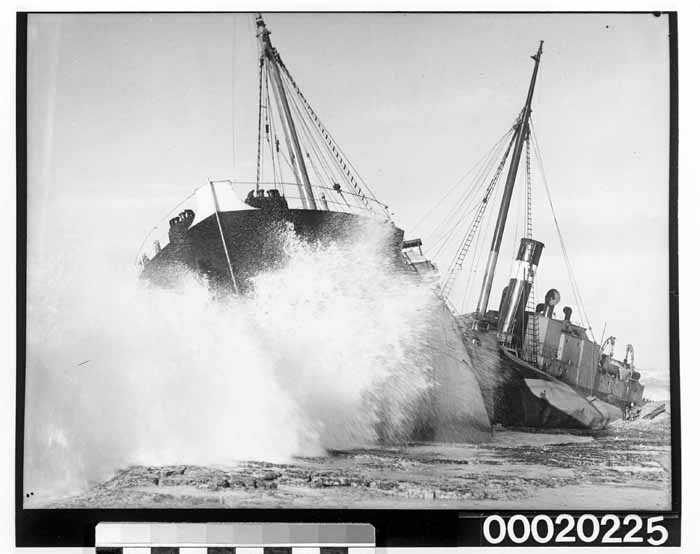
Minmi aground at Cape Banks and breaking up in May 1937.

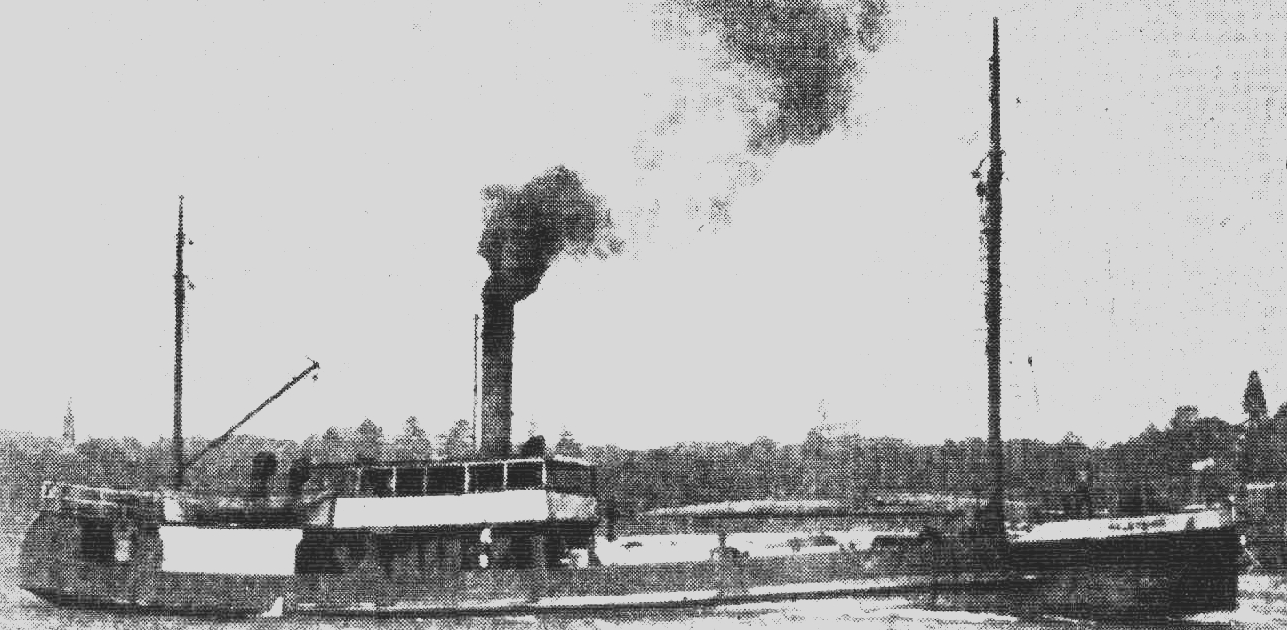
Belbowrie, a wooden-hulled ship, she was built by Rock Davis, at Blackwall, on Brisbane Water, and her engine at Mort's Dock & Engineering Company, in 1911.

In May 1937, a large J & A Brown sixty-miler, Minmi—from 1927 to 1934, she carried coal to the gasworks, then was used in the interstate coal trade—was returning from Melbourne to Newcastle, when she ran onto the rocks of Cape Banks—the northern headland of Botany Bay—at night, in heavy weather with visibility reduced by fog. The course set when passing Port Kembla should have taken her three miles off the cape, but an incoming tide and heavy weather on the starboard side possibly caused the ship to drift gradually inshore, while maintaining the notionally correct heading. Two of the crew of 26 died; one died of a heart attack soon after the ship ran onto the rocks and the other was lost in the heavy seas during the harrowing and dangerous rescue.

Munmorah collided, in December 1938, with the British cargo steamer Thistleford, which was anchored in Snail Bay.

In January 1939, a small wooden steamer, Stone Fleet ship, and sometime sixty-miler, Belbowrie, en route for Shellharbour, ran onto a rock shelf and was wrecked, at the southern point of Maroubra Bay. Although the rescue of her ten crewmen was difficult, there were no deaths.

==== World War II ====
During World War II, a number of sixty-milers were requisitioned for wartime service, including Birchgrove Park, Ayrfield, and Paterson. Himatangi was renamed HMAS Coolebar, serving first as a minesweeper and then as a stores carrier. It seems none of the requisitioned sixty-milers were lost in allied service. Despite the presence of thirteen Japanese submarines along the Australian coast and losses of other ships, none of the remaining sixty-milers that supplied Sydney with coal were lost during the war.

Some former sixty-milers became enemy vessels. In October 1944, the former sixty-miler Duckenfield—the second ship to carry that name—had been renamed Gyoun Maru and was under the Japanese flag, when sunk by American naval aircraft, south-west of Taiwan, in the South China Sea. A similar fate befell the former Beulah, which had been sold to a Chinese company in 1935; captured by the Japanese and renamed Shintai Maru, she was bombed and sunk by American aircraft, north-west of Tsunoshima, in July 1945.

==== Post-war period ====
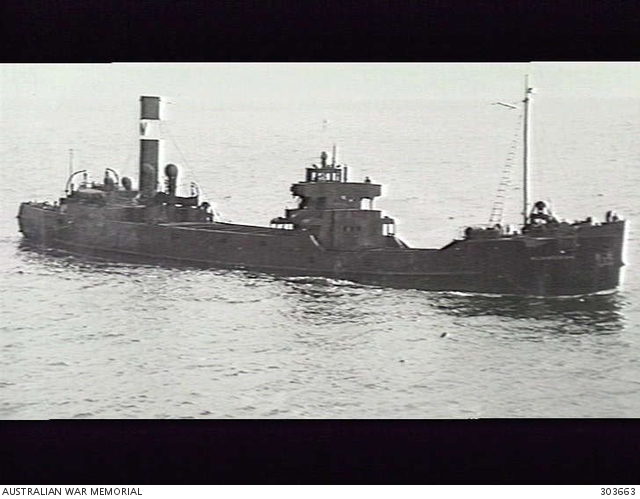
Munmorah in 1939 (AWM).

In April 1946, Wallarah collided with a large naval launch, off Goat Island in Sydney Harbour, but was able to continue to Newcastle.

In 1947, the small coastal steamer Paterson had just returned from wartime duty with the Royal Australian Navy and on her first trip carrying coal from Catherine Hill Bay to Sydney, when she had to be beached near Norah Head. She was refloated and reentered service but, in 1949, while carrying general cargo, the ship foundered near Norah Head, fortunately without loss of life. In June 1948, Mortlake Bank, while leaving Sydney for Newcastle, ran into a fishing trawler, the St. Joseph's, near Sow and Pigs Reef at night.

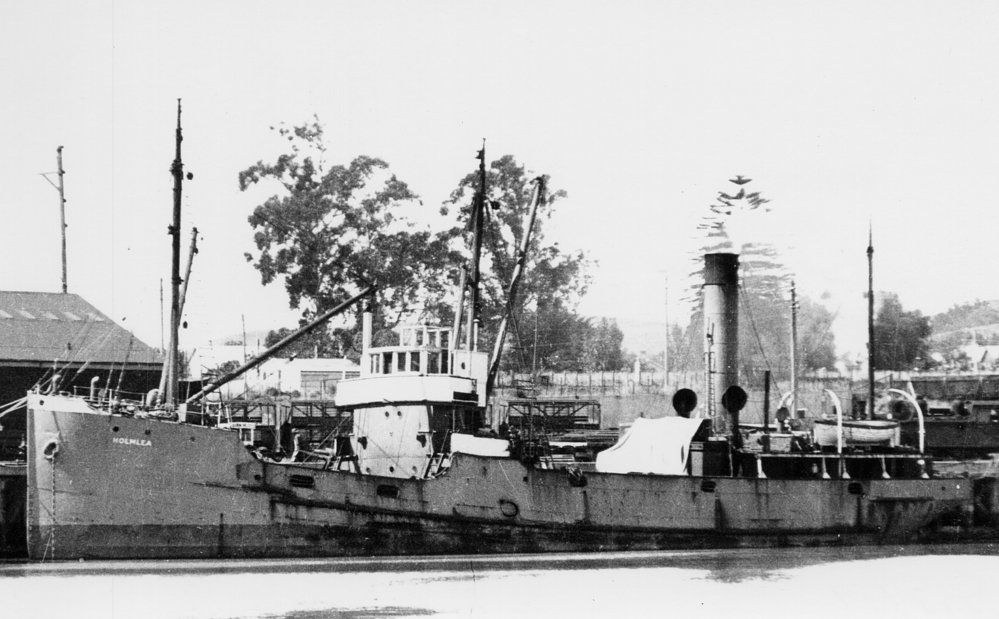
The second Stone Fleet ship called Kiama, during her earlier life as the New Zealand collier, Holmlea (between 1936 and 1950). She had only months under the name Kiama, before she sank in 1951.

Munmorah ran aground on a sandbank near the jetty at Catherine Hill Bay in 1948. Making use of her own winches and the high tide she was able to pull her way into deeper water. Just seven months later, in 1949, when arriving to load coal at the South Bulli Jetty at Bellambi, Munmorah ran aground on the reef and broke up. There were no deaths.

In January 1949, a tug, Emu, was towing Abersea past the open Glebe Island Bridge, when the tow rope snapped. Strong winds blew the tug against a guide pylon of the bridge, where she was struck in the stern area by Abersea. Emu raced for the CSR wharf at Pyrmont, where her crew scrambled to safety and the tug sank. Shortly after 9:30 a.m. on Friday, 29 September 1950, Hetton Bank collided with the bridge, damaging the bridge and disrupting road and tram traffic.

In 1951, one of the 'Stone Fleet' ships, Kiama, was carrying coal from Newcastle to Sydney, during a gale that carried her onto Tuggerah Reef—located offshore due east of Toowoon Bay. The crew took to lifeboats and rafts but were too close to the reef to be picked up safely by CSR ship, Fiona, that was nearby. Kiama broke up and sank within a few minutes. Only five of the thirteen crewmen survived by making it to shore.

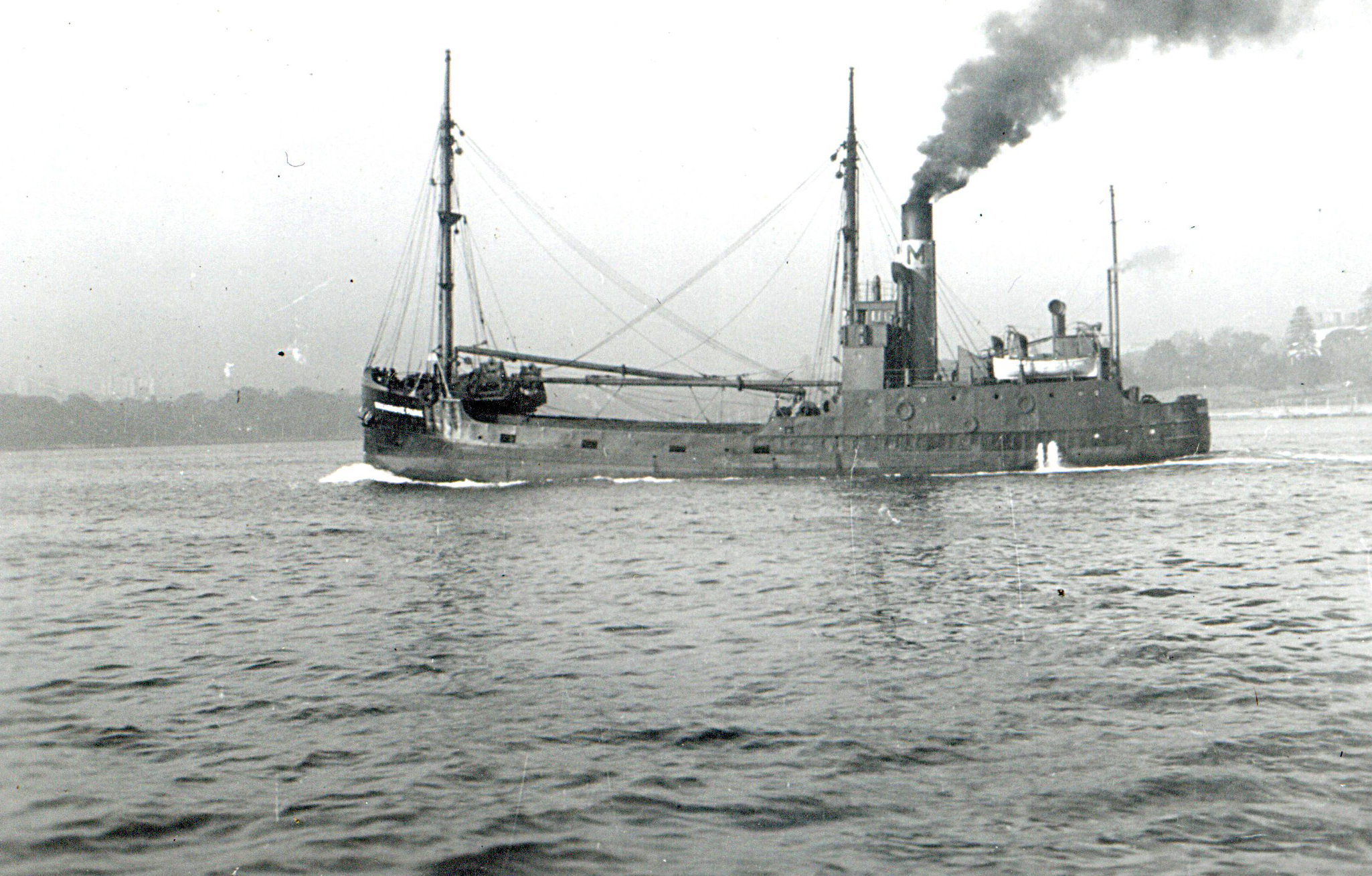
Birchgrove Park (Graeme Andrews, City of Sydney Archives)

The ship built to replace Annie M. Miller, her sister ship, Birchgrove Park, served from 1931—interrupted by her wartime service as HMAS Birchgrove Park—until she became the last sixty-miler to founder, around 2:45 a.m. on 2 August 1956. Only four of the fourteen crew of Birchgrove Park survived. One of the survivors said that the ship had a list when it left Newcastle for Sydney, and that one of the hatches was not battened down until two hours after the ship left port. Survivors told of how Captain Laurence Lynch had refused to seek the shelter of Broken Bay during a storm but had pressed on, toward Sydney, before the vessel foundered off the northern beaches of Sydney. They also told how the pumps were not started until there was too much free water in the hold, leaking in from a damaged part of the aged ship. Twenty minutes before she foundered, the list had become so bad that neither the port and starboard lifeboats could be freed. Although the ship then tried to make for Barrenjoey, it was already too late.

The survivors of the crew of Birchgrove Park told of how a signal lamp had to be used to contact South Head Lighthouse, because the ship's radio aerial was not in place. Around 2:40 a.m., they signalled that the ship was in distress. By 1956, both sender and receiver would have found use of a signal lamp unfamiliar. At the distance and affected by the stormy conditions, the signal lamp message was difficult to read, and consequently the distress message was garbled when received. Before the station replied seeking clarification, the ship was already sinking. Birchgrove Park did not fire any rockets to indicate its actual location. The signaller at South Head Light, was asked to provide a location, in the absence of other information, and gave the ship's estimated last position as six miles north of the Sydney Heads, off Long Reef, but the ship was actually further to the north. Based on the seabed location of her wreck, she was around 8 km south-east of Barrenjoey.

The pilot boat, Captain Cook (1938), had passed through the heads to start the search, around 3:15 a.m., but the police launch Nemesis did not put to sea, until two hours after the signal from the ship was received. An aerial search did not commence until it was light. Together with the absence of radio contact and the search being made around Long Reef, too far south of Birchgrove Park's last actual location, the time lost in starting the search led to a greater loss of life than otherwise might have been the case. Two exhausted survivors, drifted in a boat, with the body of a third man who had died—the man who died had survived the sinking of Kiama, in 1951—to Lobster Beach near Wagstaffe, where they scrambled ashore and sought help. Another had been found earlier, in the water near Barrenjoey, by a Royal Navy submarine, HMS Thorough. The last survivor was also in the water and too weak to grasp a lifeline when found. A junior naval officer dived into the sea to rescue him and he was taken aboard HMAS Wagga. The bodies of seven of the crew were recovered from the sea; two would never be found. The delay in beginning the search, the initial search location, and the absence of modern safety equipment, such as life rafts, had contributed to the ten deaths. One survivor told how, after half an hour in the water, another RW Miller ship, William MacArthur, unaware of the sinking, had passed so close to him that he could recognise the ship. Captain Lynch was held responsible for the loss of the ship, posthumously.

The loss of Birchgrove Park and earlier losses of other sixty-milers form parts of the narrative of a book—"The Sixty-Miler"—written by Norma Sim, the widow of Bill Sim, one of the men lost with the Birchgrove Park.

Soon after the loss of Birchgrove Park, in March 1956, another aged RW Miller ship, William MacArthur, a large sixty-miler and interstate ship, had been banned by the Seaman's Union, who held that the ship was not seaworthy, and became the subject of an industrial dispute. She was the last sixty-miler to run aground on rocks, north of Port Jackson, on 14 October 1959, after which the then damaged ship was towed to Taiwan and scrapped.

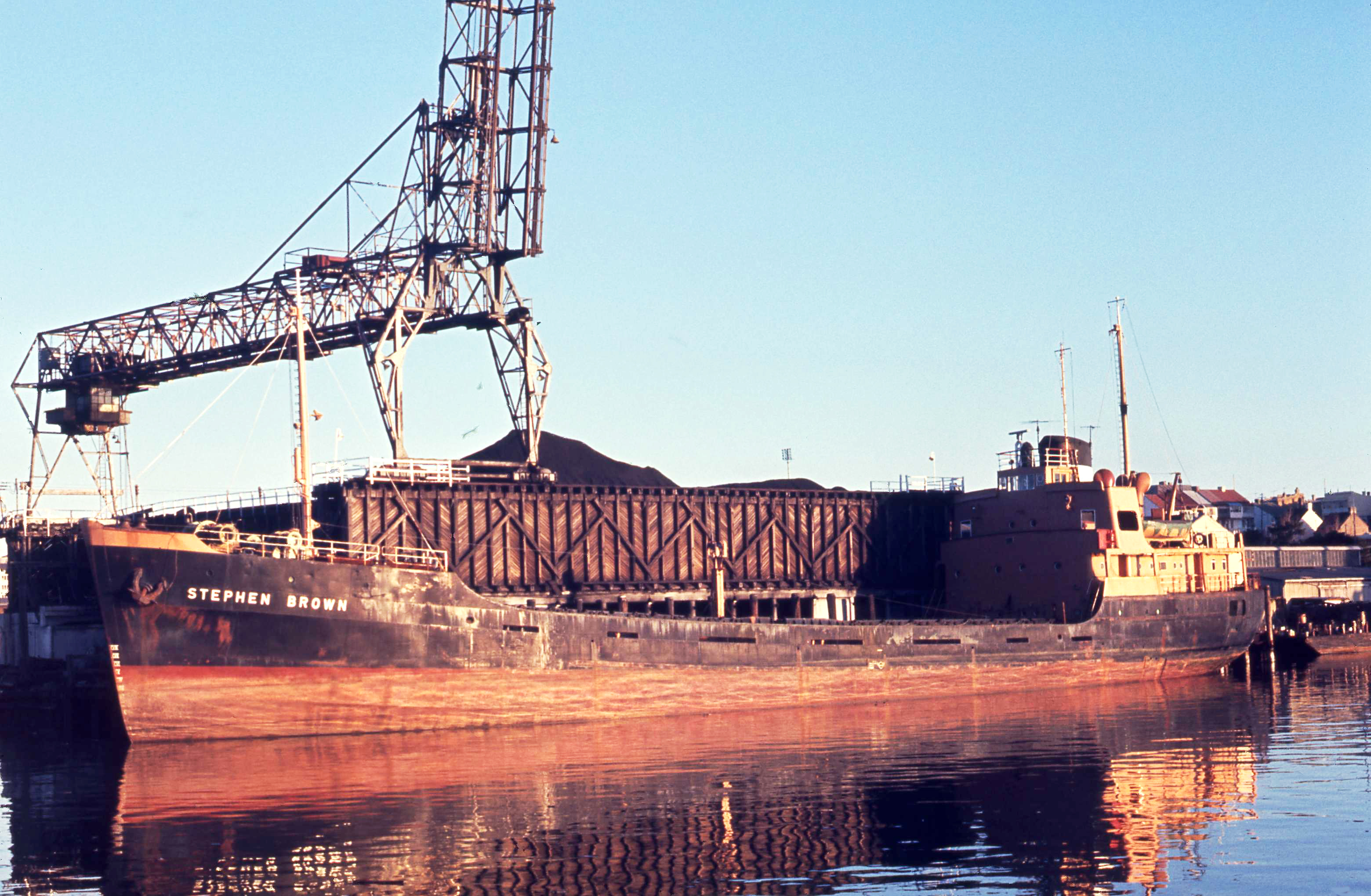
Stephen Brown at Blackwattle Bay, July 1971

One of the most modern of the sixty-milers, MV Stephen Brown—built in 1954—nearly came to grief, when some air-vents that had been closed off and some of the deck hatches lost their covers in the stormy seas. She began to fill, with the water gradually entering her holds, and developed a list. The hull sides at deck level began to go underwater, a circumstance very similar to that in the foundering of other sixty-milers. MV Stephen Brown made it through the heads into Sydney Harbour and Captain Don Turner initially proposed to beach her at Lady Jane Beach (Lady Bay Beach) just inside South Head. That proved unnecessary. Instead the ship stood off the beach pumping out some of the water. She was then able to discharge her cargo at the CSR wharf at Pyrmont as intended. MV Stephen Brown was probably saved only by her great stability. Her ventilators and hatches were modified to decrease the risk of a reoccurrence.

Hexham Bank had survived her time carrying coal as a sixty-miler but, in June 1978, while preparing to load construction aggregate ("blue metal") at Bass Point, she caught fire. All her crew were rescued. Her engine room was destroyed and the ship was deemed a "constructive loss" and scrapped. Her hulk later was later sunk off Sydney Heads.

== Decline and end of the sixty-milers ==
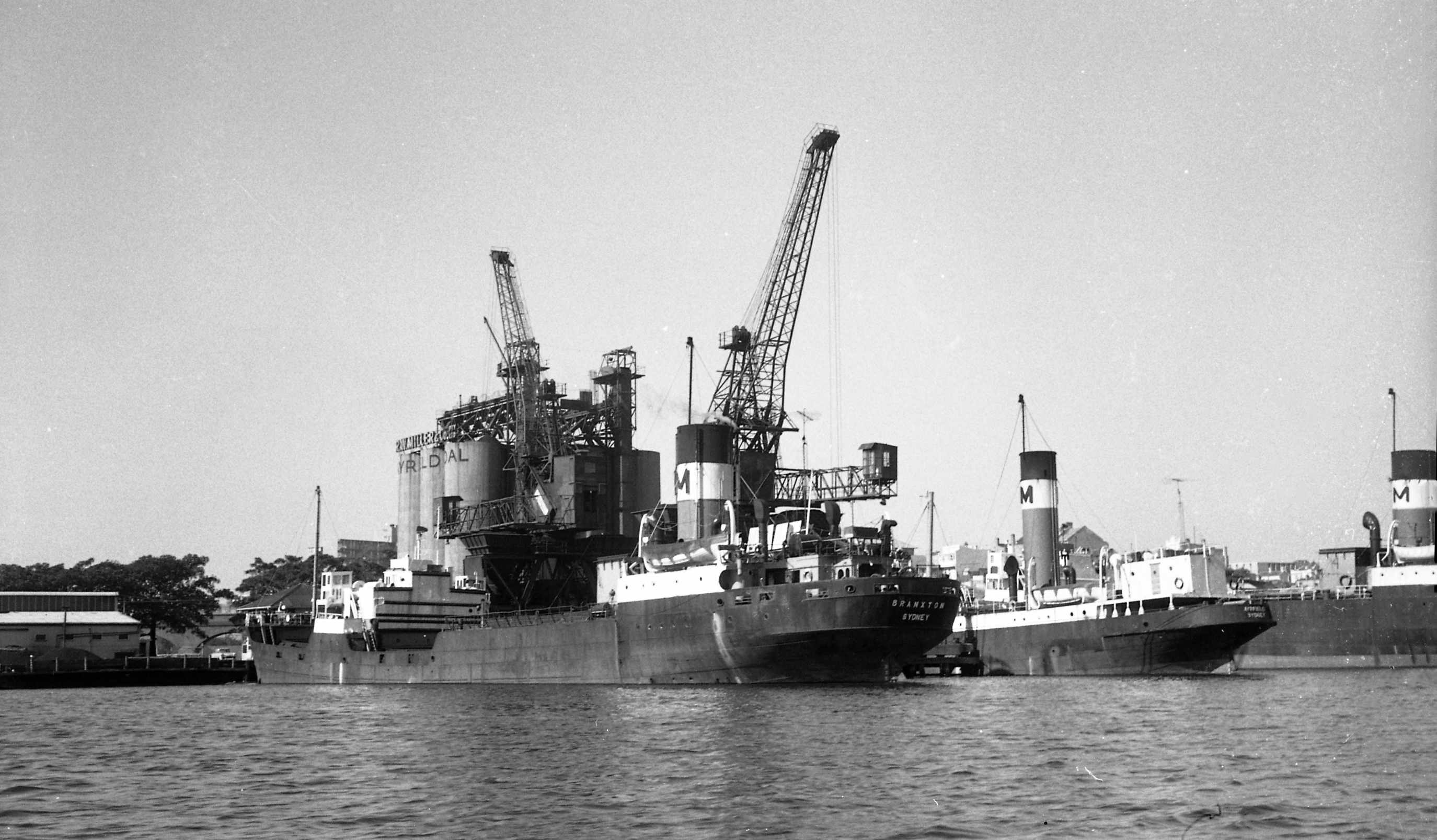
Sixty-milers of the RW Miller fleet, Branxton, Ayrfield and Teralba at Millers wharf, Blackwattle Bay in May 1968

The heyday of the sixty-milers was from around 1880 to the 1960s. During this time Sydney was dependent upon the ships. In 1919, the Royal Commission identified twenty-nine colliers engaged in the coastal coal-carrying trade.

As demand for coal in Sydney fell, the coastal coal trade of New South Wales declined. Coal-burning steamships and ferries were obsolete and were withdrawn, removing demand for bunker coal. Air pollution became a factor; industrial users converted to cleaner-burning oil fuel or electricity.

31 December 1971 was a critical turning point; the huge Mortlake gasworks ceased making town gas from coal. Petroleum replaced coal as a feedstock for town gas-making, and oil refinery gas was purchased to supplement supply, during the interval until Sydney's gas was converted to natural gas in December 1976. The gasworks at Waverton had already ceased to use coal, in 1969, and the Manly gasworks had closed in 1964.

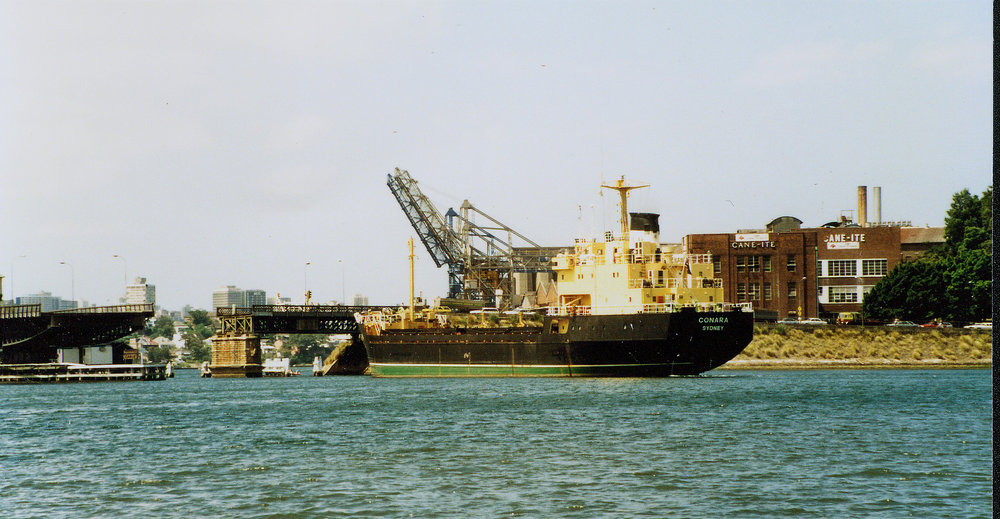
The sixty-miler MV Conara (delivered in 1977) leaving Blackwattle Bay, probably for the last time, in 1989.

After 1972, there was only one of the three loaders at Hexham operating; it closed in 1988, and the coal unloader and depot at Blackwattle Bay also closed, with Coal & Allied relinquishing their lease on the coal wharves in 1995.

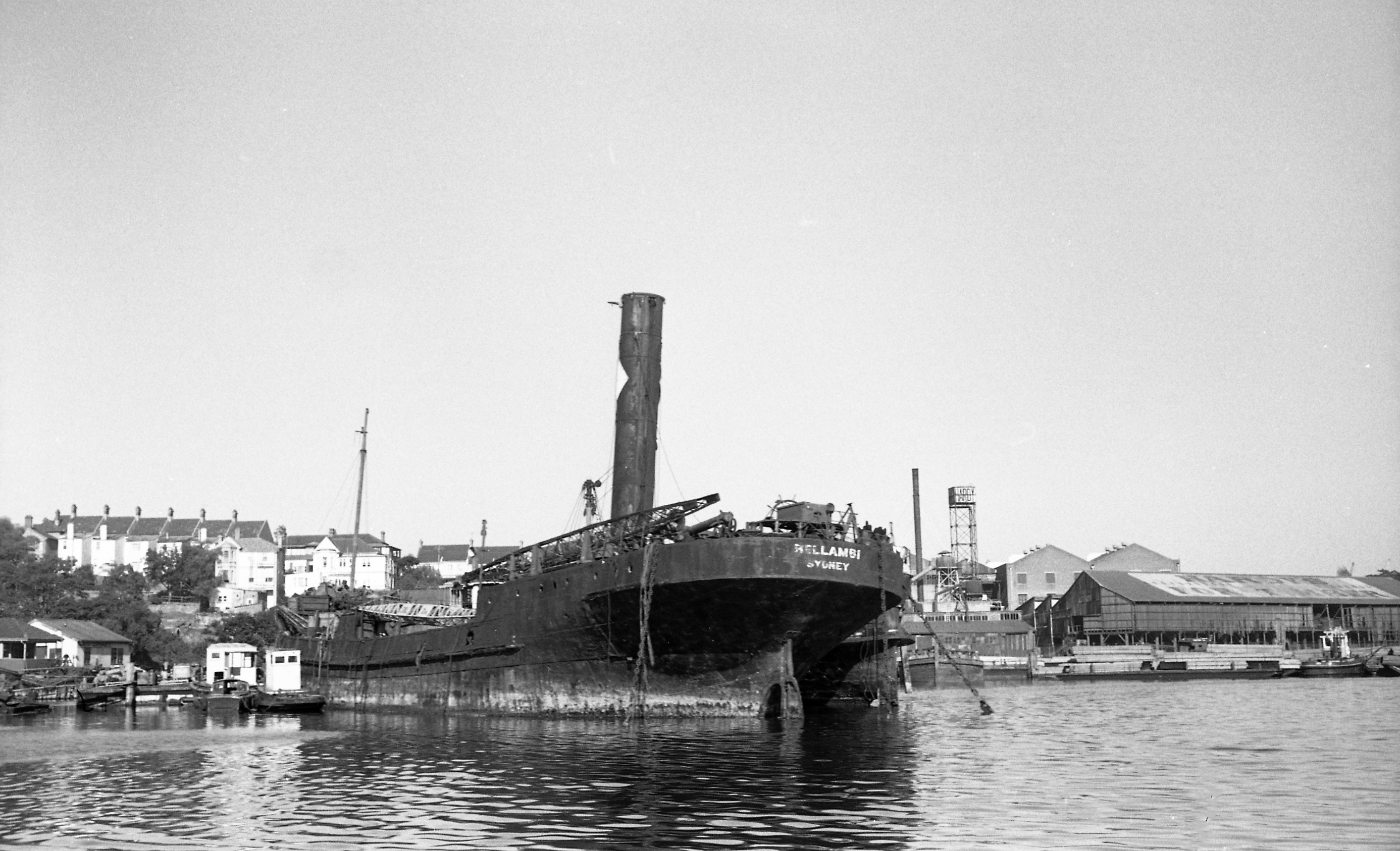
Bellambi being slowly broken up at Stride's Yard, Glebe, in May 1968

The few remaining sixty-milers mainly carried coal for export to the reopened Ball's Head Coal Loader, until it too closed for a second and last time in 1993, marking the end of the coal trade to Sydney.

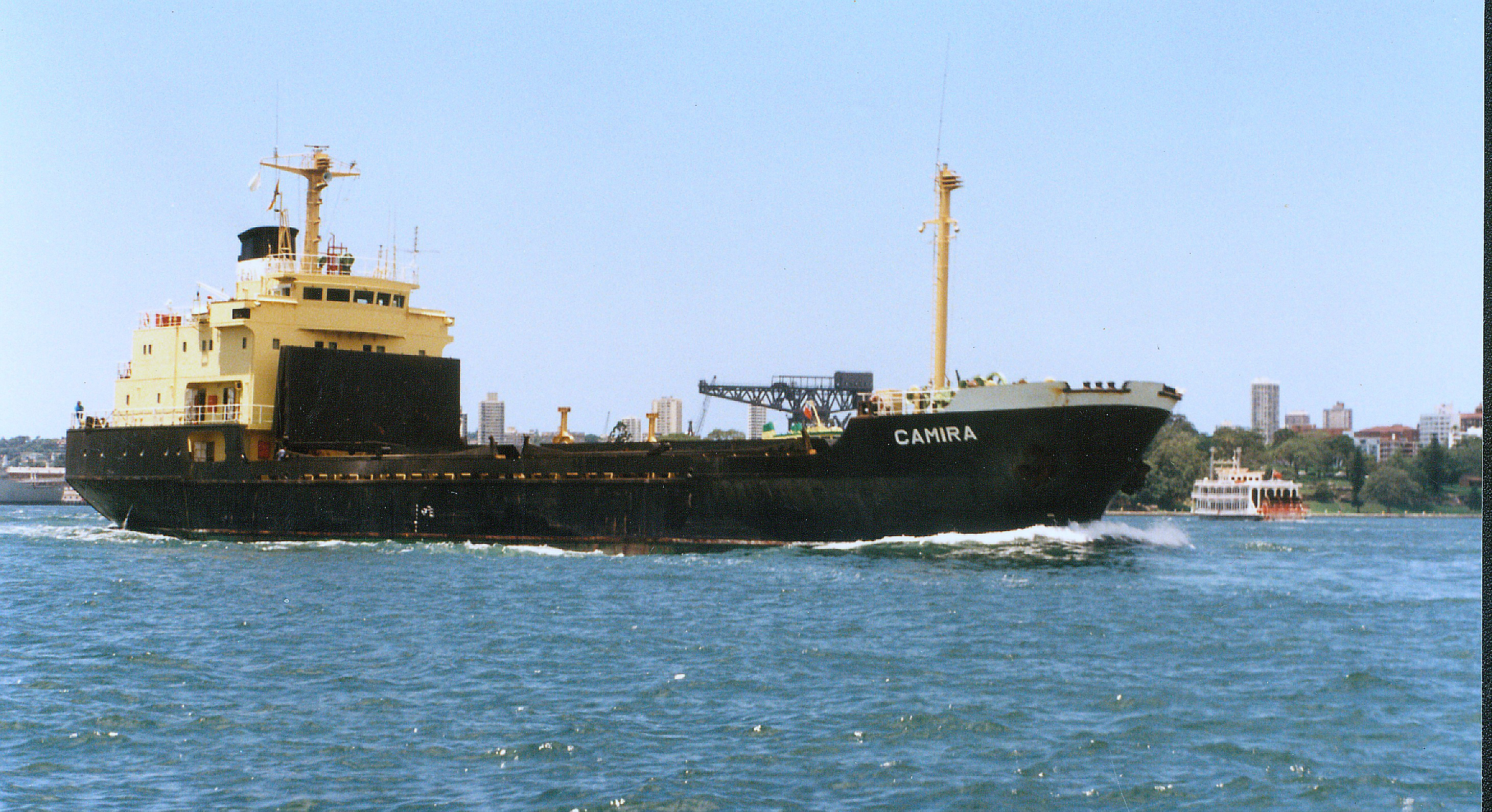
Camira (in 1990). The last sixty-miler to take coal to Balls Head and Sydney in 1993.

The last sixty-miler to unload at Ball's Head was MV Camira; she was also the last sixty-miler to be built, in 1980. MV Camira was sold in 1993 and converted to a livestock carrier. MV Camira's sister ship, MV Conara, had already been sold off, in December 1988; after several name changes, she was still in service as a bulk carrier, until at least August 2014.

During the 1980s the development of Newcastle as a bulk coal export port resulted in a revival of coastal coal shipping, this time to Newcastle. Purpose-built in 1986, a new self-discharging collier, Wallarah— the fourth collier so named and, at 5,717 gross tonnage, far larger than any older sixty-miler—carried coal from Catherine Hill Bay to Newcastle, where it was unloaded for export at the Port Waratah Coal Loader at Carrington. This last echo of the coastal coal-carrying trade ended on 22 July 2002.

== Surviving sixty-milers and wrecks ==
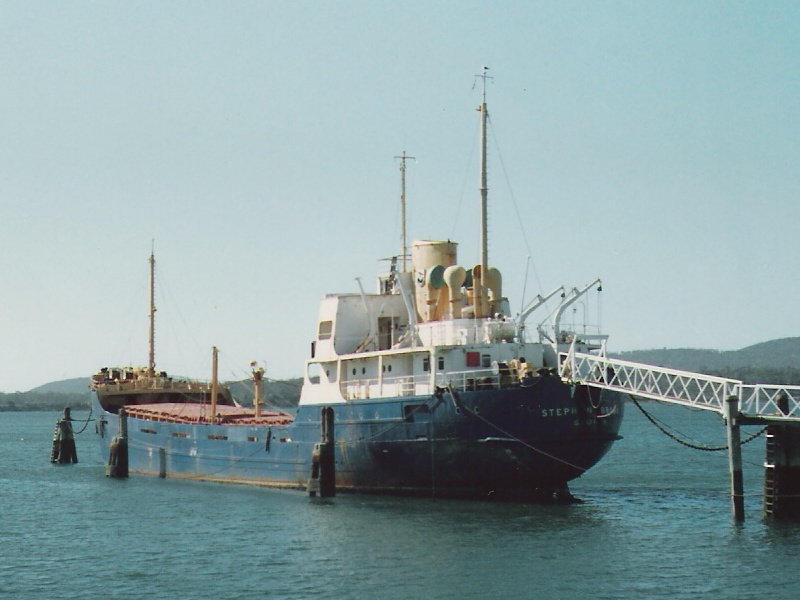
MV Stephen Brown at the Australian Maritime College in 1987

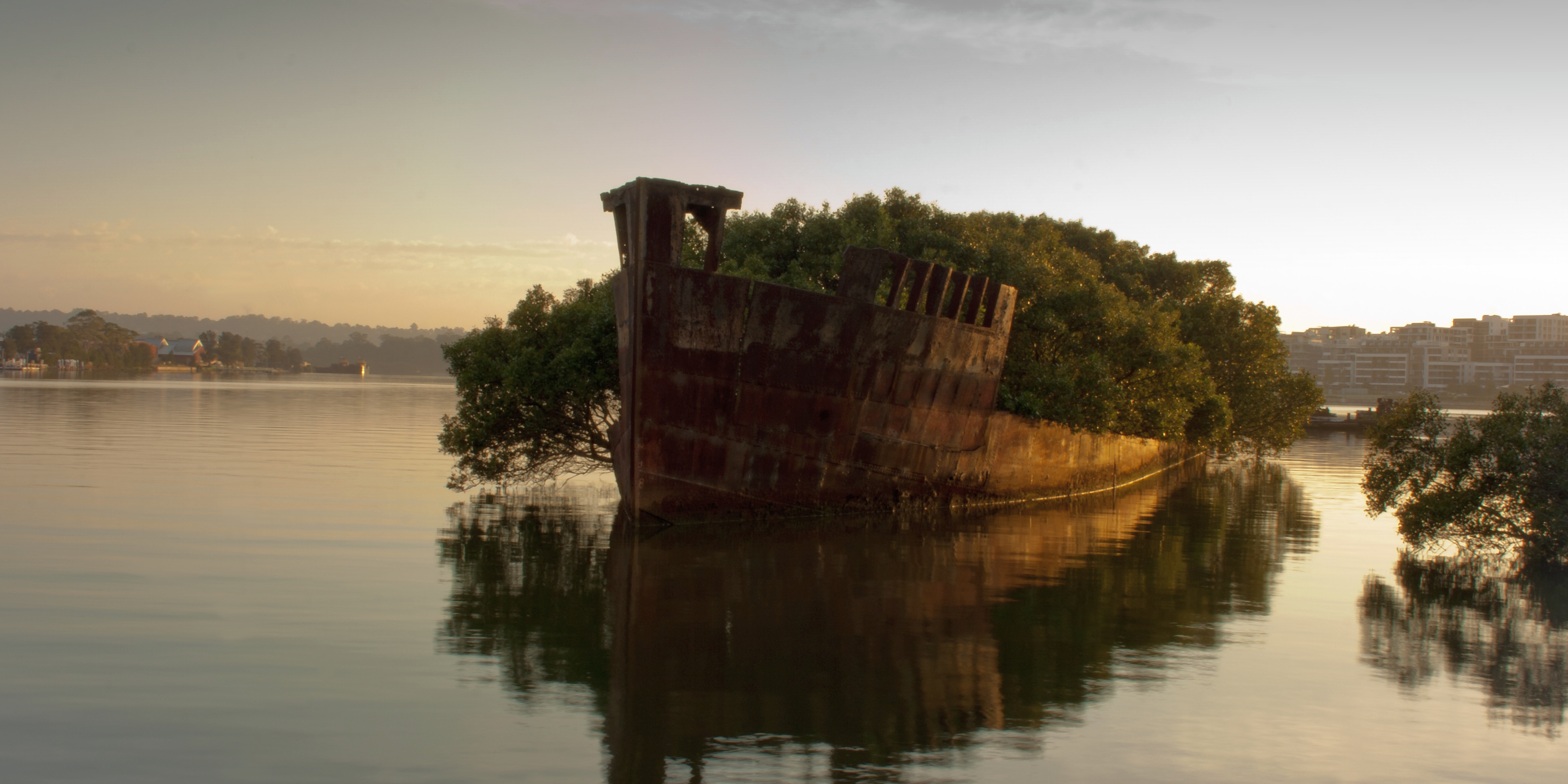
The "Forest Ship", the sixty-miler Ayrfield, in 2011, and behind it the remains of Mortlake Bank.

The last of the sixty-milers afloat and still in Australia is MV Stephen Brown, built in 1954 in Aberdeen Scotland. She ran between Hexham or Catherine Hill Bay and Sydney, and was donated in April 1983 to the Australian Maritime College. She is now permanently moored at Beauty Point on the Tamar River in Tasmania and used as a stationary training vessel.

Now better known as the "forest ship", the rusting hulk of the sixty-miler Ayrfield (built in 1911 and originally named Corrimal) rests in shallow water in Homebush Bay on the Parramatta River, which at one time was used as a breaker's yard. Ayrfield survived service as a transport ship in World War II and was later a regular on the run between Newcastle and Blackwattle Bay. She now hosts a luxuriant growth of mangrove trees and is a minor tourist attraction.

Also resting in Homebush Bay—just behind Ayrfield—is the partially disassembled hulk of another sixty-miler, Mortlake Bank (built 1924). Mortlake Bank now lies upstream of the former site of AGL's gasworks at Mortlake, to which she carried coal from Hexham for many years.

The rusted boiler of the sixty-miler Munmorah is still visible at low tide on the reef at Bellambi. Part of the stern of Minmi lies exposed on rocks on the inside of Cape Banks, at the entrance to Botany Bay, having moved since she struck the rocks on the outside of the cape in 1937. The seabed in the small cove inside Cape Banks, Cruwee Cove, is littered with girders and plates from her wreckage.

There is a memorial to the brig, Amy, erected in 1898, near where she was wrecked and her crew perished, at Thirroul. Her wreck lies only 180m off the beach, in around 5 m of water. Usually covered by sand, it is sometimes sighted by divers when conditions are suitable.

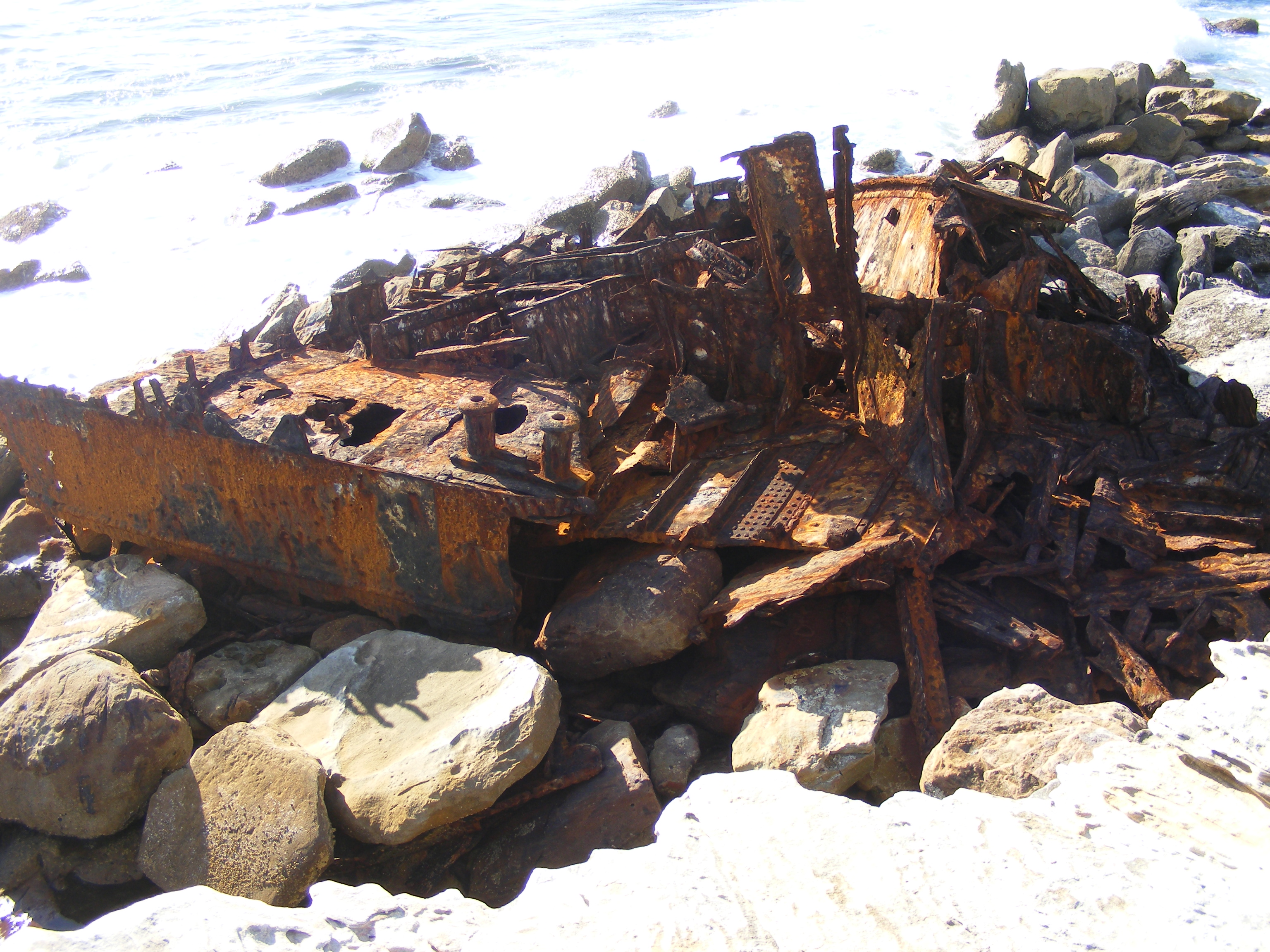
Remnants of the stern portion of Minmi, at Cape Banks, Botany Bay, in 2008.

The stripped hulks of Bellambi (originally Five Islands), Malachite, and Hexham Bank lie in deep water off the Sydney Heads, where they were scuttled after recovery of items and materials of value. The hulk of Marjorie was also scuttled, by naval gunfire, off South Head in 1952. Werfa, after her time as a sixty-miler, had become a coal hulk in Melbourne, in 1914, before being scuttled off Port Phillip Heads in 1929.

Currajong remains, where she sank, after a collision in 1910, at the bottom of the main shipping channel of Sydney Harbour for incoming ships, just off Bradleys Head. Near to Long Reef, there is little left of the sunken wrecks of Susannah Cuthbert and Euroka, both having been dynamited and stripped by salvage divers in the early 20th-century. In June 2025, divers first reached the wreck of Nemesis, lying at 160 m depth, and confirmed that the ship had been very badly damaged by heavy seas, before it sank in 1904. The wrecks of the sixty-milers Duckenfield, Woniora, Kelloe, Hilda, Undola, Tuggerah, Myola, Annie M. Miller and Birchgrove Park lie where they sank, on the sea floor near Sydney, Galava lies off Terrigal, and Yarra Yarra just north of the mouth of the Hunter River; all continue to attract adventurous divers.
