= List of Victorian royal commissions =

This is a list of royal commissions and commissions of inquiry appointed by the Government of Victoria. Royal Commissions are currently held in Victoria under the terms of the Inquiries Act 2014. This list includes Royal Commissions that were conducted jointly with the Government of Australia. Note that this list excludes Select Committees.

== Timeline ==
Year(s)	Royal Commission or Commission	Commissioner
1854	Commission appointed to enquire into the best mode of providing for the internal communication of the colony	Murphy
1854–1855	Royal commission appointed to enquire into the tenure of the waste lands of the crown	Stawell
1858–1859	Royal commission to enquire into the best method of removing the sludge from the gold fields	Sullivan
1858	Royal commission into the defences of the colony	Macarthur
1859–1860	Royal commission into the defences of the colony to consider the best mode of carrying out the recommendations of the Defences Commission of 1858	Macarthur
1860	Royal commission on harbour improvements and a river and harbour trust	Bright
1861	Royal commission to enquire into and report upon the circumstances connected with the sufferings and death of Robert O'Hara Burke and William John Wills, the Victorian explorers	Pratt
1861	The royal commission for the Victorian Exhibition, 1861 and the London International Exhibition, 1862	Barry
1862–1863	Royal mining commission appointed to enquire into the conditions and prospects of the gold fields of Victoria	Humffray
1862–1863	The royal commission appointed to enquire into the municipalities and the charitable institutions in Victoria	Sturt
1863	Royal commission to enquire into the origin and nature of the cattle disease known as pleuro-pneumonia	Griffith
1866–1867	Royal commission to examine into and report upon the best means of clearing the river Murray	Smith
1866–1867	Royal commission to enquire into and report upon the operation of the system of public education	Higginbotham
1866–1867	Royal commission to enquire into and report upon the operation and effect of the wine and spirits sale statute	Smith
1866–1867	Royal commission to inquire into and report upon the subject of certain duties proposed to be remitted or reduced by the tariff resolutions of the Legislative Assembly on the 15th day of February 1865 and which then remained uncollected	MacGregor
1867	Royal commission to enquire into and report upon applications made for authority to mine within and under certain reserved lands at Ballarat	Sullivan
1868–1869	Royal commission to enquire and report generally on the practice of paying or compensating members of the legislature in all countries where the practice prevails, and with a special view of ascertaining in each case the rate of payment or compensation, the conditions or limitations (if any) under which it is made, and the form of legislative enactment by which it has been authorized	Duffy
1870	Royal commission appointed to consider and report upon the necessity of a Federal Union of the Australian Colonies for legislative purposes and the best means of accomplishing such a Union.	Duffy
1870–1872	Royal commission on penal and prison discipline	Stawell
1870–1871	Royal commission on Intercolonial Legislation and a Court of Appeal	Casey
1870–1871	Royal commission appointed to enquire into and report upon the condition and management of the charitable institutions of the colony, and generally into all matters therewith.	Harker
1870–1871	Royal commission on noxious trades	McRea
1870–1873	Royal commission appointed to enquire into the state of the public service and the working of the Civil Service Act	A'Beckett
1871	Royal commission on foreign industries and forests	Bindon
1871–1872	Royal commission on industrial and reformatory schools and the sanatory station	Casey
1872	Royal commission to enquire into and report upon the alleged silting up of Hobson's bay since the dredging operations and also enquire into and report upon the dredging department	Clark
1872	Royal commission to enquire into the origin of the disease known as diphtheria, the best mode of treatment thereof	McRea
1873	Royal commission appointed to consider and report on the extent and character of the further accommodation required at the parliamentary buildings	Fraser
1873	Royal commission appointed to inquire into and report upon the desirability of making amendments in the Boroughs and Shires Statutes and Road Districts Act	Smith
1873	Royal commission to enquire into the system adopted by the Public Works Department in reference to contracts and the execution of public works, and generally to report upon the Department itself	MacBain
1875	Royal commission to consider and report upon the lighting and ventilation of the Legislative Assembly chamber, and the accommodation required for honourable Members	MacMahon
1875–1876	Royal commission on volunteer forces	O'Shanassy
1875–1876	Royal commission appointed to inquire into the working of the Friendly Societies Statute	Langridge
1877	Royal commission appointed to superintend the carrying out of the recommendations of the joint select committee appointed to inquire into the extent and character of the accommodation required in the parliament buildings etc.	Patterson
1877	Royal Commission on the Aborigines	William Stawell
1884-1886	Royal commission on asylums for the insane and inebriate	Stawell
1892	Royal commission on charitable institutions	
1909	Royal Commission on the Acquisition of Certain Estates by Sir Thomas Bent, as a Minister of the Crown	Thomas Gibson-Carmichael
1915	Royal Commission on Closer Settlement	John Glass Johnstone
1924	Royal Commission into the Hospital for Insane, Kew	Alfred Aldridge Kelley
1924–1925	Royal Commission on the Victorian Police Force	John Monash; Charles McPherson; John Martin
1925	Royal Commission on Soldier Settlement	James Turnbull
1928	Royal Commission of Inquiry Into The Victorian Railways Department	
1931–1933	Royal Commission on Migrant Land Settlement	George Dethridge
1944	Royal Commission On Yallourn Bushfires	
1946–1947	Royal Commission On Forest Grazing	
1947	Royal Commission On Electricity Supply	
1949	Royal Commission On Bread Industry	
1949–1950	Royal Commission Inquiring into the Origins, Aims, Objects and Funds of the Communist Party in Victoria and Other Related Matters	Sir Charles Lowe
1952	Royal Commission Appointed to Inquire into Certain Allegations of Improper Conduct	Sir Edmund Herring
1956	Royal Commission to Inquire into the Operation of the Housing Acts of Victoria and the Administration of the Housing Commission	Alan John Moir
1958–1959	Royal Commission into Off-The-Course Betting	Russell Martin
1959–1960	Royal Commission on Motor Car Third-Party Compulsory Insurance	Elias Coppel
1960	Victoria Market Royal Commission	R. A. Smithers
1962–1963	Royal Commission into the Failure of Kings Bridge	Edward Barber
1963–1965	Royal Commission into the Sale, Supply, Disposal or Consumption of Liquor	Philip Phillips
1970–1971	Royal Commission into the Failure of the West Gate Bridge	Barber
1977–1979	Australian Royal Commission of Inquiry into Drugs (joint)	Edward Williams
1979–1982	Royal Commission into Certain Housing Commission Land Purchases and Other Matters	Sydney Frost
1980–1984	Royal Commission on the Activities of the Federated Ship Painters and Dockers Union (joint)	Frank Costigan
1981–1982	Royal Commission into the Australian Meat Industry (joint)	Edward Woodward
1981–1983	Royal Commission of Inquiry into Drug Trafficking (joint)	Donald Stewart
1981–1982	Royal Commission into the Activities of the Australian Building Construction Employees and Builders Labourers' Federation (joint)	John Winneke
1985–1986	Royal Commission of Inquiry into Alleged Telephone Interceptions (joint)	Stewart
1986–1998	Royal Commission into Grain Storage, Handling and Transport (joint)	Jim McColl
1990–1992	Royal Commission into the Tricontinental Group of Companies	Woodward
1998–1999	Longford Royal Commission	Daryl Dawson
1999–2001	Metropolitan Ambulance Service Royal Commission	Lex Lasry
2009–2010	2009 Victorian Bushfires Royal Commission	Bernard Teague
2015–2016	Royal Commission into Family Violence	Marcia Neave
2018–2021	Mental Health Royal Commission	Penny Armytage
2018–2020	Royal Commission into the Management of Police Informants	Margaret McMurdo
2021	Royal Commission into the Casino Operator and Licence	Raymond Finkelstein
2021–2025	Yoorrook Justice Commission	Eleanor Bourke; Wayne Atkinson; Kevin Bell; Sue-Anne Hunter; Maggie Walter
2026–2027 (expected)	Royal Commission into the Integrity of Major Public and Civil Infrastructure Construction Projects in Victoria	Chris Kourakis

== See also ==
- List of Australian royal commissions
- List of New South Wales royal commissions
- List of Queensland commissions of inquiry
- List of South Australian royal commissions
- List of Western Australian royal commissions
