= List of Australian royal commissions =

Royal commissions (sometimes called commissions of inquiry) have been held in Australia at a federal level since 1902. Royal commissions appointed by the Governor-General operate under the Royal Commissions Act 1902 passed by the Parliament of Australia in 1902. The governments of the states and territories of Australia have also appointed royal commissions, although they are not included in this list unless they were appointed jointly by the Government of Australia and a state or territory government.

In 2010, the Australian Law Reform Commission (ALRC) conducted an inquiry into the operation and provisions of the Royal Commissions Act 1902, investigating possible alternative forms of executive inquiry. The ALRC Report ALRC 111 was tabled (presented for consideration) in Parliament in February 2010, but has not been implemented.

== Held in 1900–1920 ==
1. Royal Commission appointed to inquire into and report upon the arrangements made for the transport of troops returning from service in South Africa in the S.S. "Drayton Grange" (1902)
2. Royal Commission on sites for the seat of government of the Commonwealth (1903)
3. Royal Commission on the Bonuses for Manufactures Bill (1903–1904)
4. Royal Commission on the butter industry (1904–1905)
5. Royal Commission on the Navigation Bill (1904–1906)
6. Royal Commission on the affray at Goaribari Island, British New Guinea, on 6 March 1904 (1904)
7. Royal Commission on customs and excise tariffs (1904–1907)
8. Royal Commission on old-age pensions (1905–1906)
9. Royal Commission on the tobacco monopoly (1905–1906)
10. Royal Commission on ocean shipping service (1906)
11. British New Guinea—Royal Commission of inquiry into the present conditions, including the method of government, of the Territory of Papua, and the best means of their improvement (1906–1907)
12. Royal Commission on secret drugs, cures, and foods (1906–1907)
13. Royal Commission on postal services (1908–1910)
14. Royal Commission on insurance (1908–1910)
15. Royal Commission on stripper harvesters and drills (1908–1909)
16. Royal Commission on Tasmanian customs leakage (1910–1911)
17. Royal Commission on the sugar industry (1911–1912)
18. Royal Commission on the pearl-shelling industry (1912–1916)
19. Royal Commission on the fruit industry (1912–1914)
20. Royal Commission appointed to inquire into certain charges against Mr. Henry Chinn (1913)
21. Royal Commission on Northern Territory railways and ports (1913–1914)
22. Royal Commission on powellised timber (1913–1914)
23. Royal Commission upon the Commonwealth electoral law and administration (1914–1915)
24. Royal Commission on meat export trade (1914)
25. Royal Commission on food supplies and trade and industry during the war (1914)
26. Royal Commission on mail services and trade development between Australia and the New Hebrides (1915)
27. Royal Commission on Liverpool Military Camp, New South Wales (1915)
28. Royal Commission on the charges made by D. L. Gilchrist concerning the construction of the western section of the Kalgoorlie to Port Augusta Railway (1916)
29. Royal Commission to inquire into and report upon certain charges against the Administrator and other officers of the Northern Territory Administration (1916)
30. Royal Commission on Federal Capital Administration (1916–1917)
31. Royal Commission on Java and the East Indies, Singapore and the Straits Settlements (1917–1918)
32. Royal Commission on Navy and Defence Administration (1917–1919)
33. Royal Commission on the war—Australian Imperial Force. Report as to number of members fit for active service and number of reinforcements and enlistments required (1918)
34. Royal Commission on Public Service administration, Commonwealth of Australia (1918–1920)
35. Royal Commission upon the public expenditure of the Commonwealth of Australia with a view to effecting economies (1918–1921)
36. Royal Commission on taxation of leasehold estates in Crown lands (1918–1919)
37. Royal Commission on the sugar industry (1919–1920)
38. Royal Commission on industrial troubles on Melbourne wharfs (1919–1920)
39. Royal Commission on late German New Guinea (1919–1920)
40. Royal Commission to inquire into complaints by the munition worker passengers to Australia by the transport "Bahia Castillo" (1919)
41. Royal Commission on Northern Territory Administration (1919–1920)
42. Royal Commission on the basic wage (1919–1920)
43. Royal Commission on taxation (1920–1923) (Note: Joint with Queensland, Tasmania and Western Australia.)
44. Royal Commission on the increase of the selling price of coal (1920)

== Held in 1921–1940 ==
45. Royal Commission on the matter of uniform railway gauge (1921)
46. Royal Commission on pillaging of ships' cargoes (1921)
47. Royal Commission on Cockatoo Island Dockyard (1921)
48. Royal Commission upon the loyalty to the British Crown of German Nationals resident in Australia whose property is liable to a charge created by the Treaty of Peace Regulations made under the Treaty of Peace (Germany) Act 1919–1920 (1921)
49. Royal Commission on the circumstances attending the supposed loss at sea of the steamship "Sumatra" (1923)
50. Royal Commission in connection with sugar purchases by the Commonwealth through Mr. W. E. Davies in September and October, 1920 (1923–1924)
51. Royal Commission in connection with joinery supplied to the War Service Homes Commissioner in March, 1920 (1923–1924)
52. Royal Commission on the Navigation Act (1923–1925)
53. Royal Commission on national insurance (1923–1927)
54. Royal Commission on the method for determining the unimproved value of land held under Crown leases (1924–1925)
55. Royal Commission on the assessment of war service disabilities (1924–1925)
56. Royal Commission to inquire into extracts from the reports in Parliamentary Debates of speeches made by Mr. Scullin in the House of Representatives on 7 and 19 August 1924, in relation to land tax matters (1924–1925)
57. Royal Commission on the finances of Western Australia, as affected by Federation (1924–1925)
58. Royal Commission on health (1925–1926)
59. Royal Commission on Norfolk Island affairs (1926)
60. Royal Commission on certain matters in connexion with the British Phosphate Commission (1926)
61. Royal Commission on wireless (1927)
62. Royal Commission on the Edie Creek (New Guinea) leases (1927)
63. Royal Commission on the Moving Picture Industry in Australia (1927–1928)
64. Royal Commission on the Constitution (1927–1929)
65. Royal Commission on child endowment or family allowances (1927–1929)
66. Royal Commission of inquiry into fatalities at Bundaberg (1928)
67. Royal Commission appointed to inquire into statements in the press in regard to offers alleged to have been made to members to resign seats in the Federal Parliament (1928)
68. Royal Commission on the finances of South Australia, as affected by Federation (1928–1929)
69. Royal Commission on the coal industry (1929)
70. Royal Commission appointed to inquire into allegations affecting members of the Parliamentary Joint Committee of Public Accounts in connexion with claims made by broadcasting companies against the Commonwealth Government (1930)
71. Royal Commission on Jacob Johnson (1931)
72. Royal Commission on performing rights (1932–1933)
73. Royal Commission on taxation (1932–1934)
74. Royal Commission on mineral oils and petrol and other products of mineral oils (1933–1935)
75. Royal Commission on the wheat, flour and bread industries (1934–1936)
76. Royal Commission appointed to inquire into and report upon the circumstances associated with the retirement of Lieutenant-Commander Alan Dermot Casey from the Royal Australian Navy (1934)
77. Royal Commission appointed to inquire into the monetary and banking systems at present in operation in Australia (1935–1937)
78. Royal Commission on doctors' remuneration for national insurance service and other contract practice (1938)
79. Royal Commission regarding the contract for the erection of additions to the General Post Office, Sydney (1939)

== Held in 1941–1960 ==
80. Royal Commission to inquire into and report upon the contract or contracts with Abbco Bread Co. Pty. Limited for the supply of bread to the Department of the Army, and other matters (1941)
81. Royal Commission to inquire into circumstances under which certain public monies were used and to whom, and for what purposes such moneys were paid (1941)
82. Royal Commission in the matter of an inquiry into a statement that there was a document missing from the official files in relation to "The Brisbane Line" (1943)
83. Royal Commission to inquire into and report upon certain transactions of the Sydney Land Sales Control Office, and the Canberra Land Sales Control Office of the Treasury (1947)
84. Royal Commission appointed to inquire into certain transactions in relation to timber rights in the Territory of Papua-New Guinea (1949)
85. Royal Commission on the Port Augusta to Alice Springs Railway (1951–1952)
86. Royal Commission on television (1953–1954)
87. Royal Commission on Espionage (1954–1955)

== Held in 1961–1980 ==
88. Royal Commission on alleged improper practices and improper refusal to co-operate with the Victoria Police Force on the part of persons employed in the Postmaster-General's Department in Victoria in relation to illegal gambling (1962–1963)
89. Royal Commission on loss of HMAS Voyager (1964)
90. Royal Commission on the statement of Lieutenant Commander Cabban and matters incidental thereto (1967–1968)
91. Royal Commission into Exploratory and Production Drilling for Petroleum in the Area of the Great Barrier Reef (1970–1974) (Note: Joint with Queensland.)
92. Aboriginal Land Rights Commission (1973–1974)
93. Australian Post Office Commission of inquiry (1973–1974)
94. Commission of inquiry into land tenures (1973–1976)
95. National Estate Committee of Inquiry (1973-1974)
96. Royal Commission on petroleum (1973–1976)
97. Commission of Inquiry into the maritime industry (1973–1976)
98. Independent Inquiry into Frequency Modulation Broadcasting (1973–1974)
99. Commission of Inquiry into transport to and from Tasmania (1974–1976)
100. Royal Commission on Australian Government Administration (1974–1976)
101. Royal Commission on Human Relationships (1974–1978)
102. Royal Commission on Intelligence and Security (1974–1977)
103. Royal Commission into alleged payments to maritime unions (1974–1976)
104. Royal Commission to inquire into and report upon certain incidents in which Aborigines were involved in the Laverton area (1975–1976) (Note: Joint with Western Australia.)
105. Royal Commission on Norfolk Island (1975–1976)
106. Australian Royal Commission of inquiry into drugs (1977–1980) (Note: Joint with Queensland, Tasmania, Victoria and Western Australia.)
107. Royal Commission of inquiry into matters in relation to electoral redistribution Queensland, 1977 (1978)
108. Commission of inquiry into the efficiency and administration of hospitals (1979–1981)
109. Commission of inquiry into the viability of the Christmas Island phosphate industry (1979–1980)
110. Royal Commission on the activities of the Federated Ship Painters and Dockers Union (1980–1984) (Note: Joint with Victoria.)

== Held in 1981–2000 ==
111. Royal Commission of Inquiry into Drug Trafficking (1981–1983) (Note: Joint with New South Wales, Queensland, Victoria and New Zealand.)
112. Royal Commission into the activities of the Australian Building Construction Employees' and Builders Labourers' Federation (1981–1982)
113. Royal Commission into Australian meat industry (1981–1982)
114. Royal Commission of Inquiry into the activities of the Nugan Hand Group (1983–1985) (Note: Joint with New South Wales.)
115. Royal Commission on the use and effects of chemical agents on Australian personnel in Vietnam (1983–1985)
116. Royal Commission on Australia's security and intelligence agencies (1983–1985)
117. Commission of inquiry into compensation arising from social security conspiracy prosecutions (1984–1986)
118. Royal Commission into British nuclear tests in Australia (1984–1985)
119. Royal Commission of inquiry into alleged telephone interceptions (1985–1986) (Note: Joint with New South Wales and Victoria.)
120. Royal Commission of inquiry into the Chamberlain convictions (1986–1987) (Note: Joint with Northern Territory.)
121. Royal Commission into grain storage, handling and transport (1986–1988) (Note: Joint with New South Wales, Queensland, South Australia, Victoria and Western Australia.)
122. Royal Commission into Aboriginal Deaths in Custody (1987–1991) (Note: Joint with New South Wales, Northern Territory, Queensland, South Australia, Tasmania, Victoria and Western Australia.)
123. Commission of inquiry into the Australian Secret Intelligence Service (1994–1995)
124. Royal Commission of inquiry into the leasing by the Commonwealth of accommodation in Centenary House (1994)
125. Commission of Inquiry into the relations between the CAA and Seaview Air (1994–1996)

== Held in 2001–2020 ==
126. Royal Commission into HIH Insurance (2001–2003)
127. Royal Commission into the Building and Construction Industry (2001–2003)
128. Royal Commission to Inquire into the Centenary House Lease (2004)
129. Inquiry into certain Australian companies in relation to the UN Oil-For-Food Programme (2005–2006)
130. Equine Influenza Inquiry (2008)
131. Royal Commission into Institutional Responses to Child Sexual Abuse (2013–2017)
132. Royal Commission into the Home Insulation Program (2013–2014)
133. Royal Commission into Trade Union Governance and Corruption (2014–2015)
134. Royal Commission into the Child Protection and Youth Detention Systems of the Government of the Northern Territory (2016–2017)
135. Royal Commission into Misconduct in the Banking, Superannuation and Financial Services Industry (2017–2019)
136. Royal Commission into Aged Care Quality and Safety (2018–2021)
137. Royal Commission into Violence, Abuse, Neglect and Exploitation of People with Disability (2019–2023)
138. Royal Commission into National Natural Disaster Arrangements (2020)

== Held since 2021 ==
139. Royal Commission into the Robodebt Scheme (2022–2023)
140. Royal Commission into Defence and Veteran Suicide (2021–2024)
141. Royal Commission on Antisemitism and Social Cohesion (2026–)

== See also ==
- List of New South Wales royal commissions
- List of Queensland commissions of inquiry
- List of South Australian royal commissions
- List of Tasmanian royal commissions
- List of Victorian royal commissions
- List of Western Australian royal commissions
