= List of acts of the Parliament of Victoria from 1966 =

This is a list of acts of the Parliament of Victoria, Australia for the year 1966.

== 1966 ==
Short title, or popular name	Citation	Royal assent
Long title
Education (Council of Adult Education) Act 1966	No. 7372	5 April 1966
An Act to amend Sub-section (3) of Section Sixty-six of the Education Act 1958. (Note: Education Act 1958 (No. 6240))
Audit (Amendment) Act 1966	No. 7377	14 April 1966
An Act to amend the Audit Act 1958, (Note: Audit Act 1958 (No. 6203)) and for other purposes.
State Library National Gallery National Museum and Institute of Applied Science (Amendment) Act 1966	No. 7379	27 April 1966
An Act to amend Sections Fifteen and Thirty-one of the State Library National Gallery National Museum and Institute of Applied Science Act 1960 (Note: State Library National Gallery National Museum and Institute of Applied Science Act 1960 (No. 6688)) and for other purposes.
Reid Murray Acceptance Limited (Scheme of Arrangement) Act 1966	No. 7380	27 April 1966
An Act to facilitate the Making of an Application to the Supreme Court of Victoria for the Approval of a Scheme of Arrangement between Reid Murray Acceptance Limited and its Creditors and for other purposes.
Lake Corangamite Act 1966	No. 7381	27 April 1966
An Act relating to the Surrender to the Crown of Certain Lands inundated by or adjacent to Lakes Corangamite, Gnarpurt or Murdeduke and for other purposes.
Wombat Bonuses Act 1966	No. 7385	3 May 1966
An Act to suspend the Operation of Section Twenty-four of the Vermin and Noxious Weeds Act 1958 (Note: Vermin and Noxious Weeds Act 1958 (No. 6409)) in relation to Wombats.
Loch Public Hall Trust Act 1966	No. 7387	10 May 1966
An Act to validate a certain Deed of Trust relating to certain Land at Loch and the Building thereon known as the Loch Mechanics' Institute Hall, to authorize the Application of certain Moneys raised for the Purpose of building a Memorial Hall at Loch to the Erection of Extensions to the said Building, and for other purposes.
Constitution Act Amendment Act 1966	No. 7392	10 May 1966
An Act to amend Section 66 of The Constitution Act Amendment Act 1958. (Note: Constitution Act Amendment Act 1958 (No. 6224))
Vagrancy Act 1966	No. 7393	10 May 1966
An Act to re-enact with Amendments the Law relating to Vagrancy and Kindred Offences and for Purposes connected therewith.
	No. 7394	10 May 1966
An Act to apply out of the Consolidated Revenue the sum of Ninety-two million eight hundred and ninety-one thousand three hundred and twenty dollars to the service of the year One thousand nine hundred and sixty-six and One thousand nine hundred and sixty-seven.
Daylesford Springs Land Act 1966	No. 7396	10 May 1966
An Act relating to certain Land at Daylesford permanently reserved as a Site for Mineral Springs and an Ornamental Lake and for the Recreation Convenience and Amusement of the People, and for other purposes.
Sheep Dipping (Repeal) Act 1966	No. 7398	17 May 1966
An Act to repeal the Sheep Dipping Act 1958. (Note: Sheep Dipping Act 1958 (No. 6370))
Seymour Racecourse Land Act 1966	No. 7400	17 May 1966
An Act to authorize the Leasing of Portion of certain Land in the Parish of Tallarook permanently reserved as a Site for Racecourse and Other Purposes of Public Recreation.
Shepparton Abattoirs Act 1966 (repealed)	No. 7401	17 May 1966
An Act to make Temporary Provision with respect to the Powers of the Council of the Shire of Shepparton to obtain Allowances by Overdraft of Current Account and for other purposes. (Repealed by Legislation Reform (Repeals No. 2) Act 2008 (No. 16 of 2008))
Paisley-Galvin Railway Land Exchange Act 1966 (repealed)	No. 7402	17 May 1966
An Act to provide for the Exchange of certain Lands vested in The Victorian Railways Commissioners or of which The Victorian Railways Commissioners is the Registered Proprietor for certain Lands of which Altona Petrochemical Company Proprietary Limited is the Registered Proprietor and for other purposes. (Repealed by Transport Act 1983 (No. 9921))
Aerial Spraying Control Act 1966	No. 7403	17 May 1966
An Act relating to the Spraying of Agricultural Chemicals from Aircraft and for incidental and other purposes.
Summary Offences Act 1966	No. 7405	17 May 1966
An Act to re-enact with Amendments the Law relating to certain Police Offences.
Opticians Registration (Amendment) Act 1966	No. 7409	17 May 1966
An Act to repeal Sub-section (4) of Section 14 of the Opticians Registration Act 1958. (Note: Opticians Registration Act 1958 (No. 6329))
Carlton (Recreation Ground) Land Act 1966	No. 7412	17 May 1966
An Act to authorize the Granting of Leases of certain Land at Carlton in the City of Melbourne permanently reserved as a Site for a Public Park, and for other purposes.
Warragul and Neerim Railway Lands Act 1966 (repealed)	No. 7414	17 May 1966
An Act relating to certain Railway Land in the Parish of Drouin East, and for other purposes. (Repealed by Transport Act 1983 (No. 9921))
Victoria Institute of Colleges (Council) Act 1966	No. 7415	17 May 1966
An Act to amend the Victoria Institute of Colleges Act 1965 (Note: Victoria Institute of Colleges Act 1965 (No. 7291)) in relation to the Establishing of the Council of the Victoria Institute of Colleges, and for other purposes.
Pensions Supplementation Act 1966	No. 7417	17 May 1966
An Act to make Provision with respect to the Supplementation of certain Pensions payable under the Police Regulation Act 1958 (Note: Police Regulation Act 1958 (No. 6338)) or under the Superannuation Act 1958, (Note: Superannuation Act 1958 (No. 6386)) to amend the Police Regulation Act 1958 and the Superannuation Act 1958 and for other purposes.
Melbourne University (Chancellorship) Act 1966	No. 7426	24 May 1966
An Act to amend Sections 5, 11 and 12 of the Melbourne University Act 1958. (Note: University Act 1958 (No. 6405))
	No. 7428	24 May 1966
An Act to apply out of the Consolidated Revenue the sum of Two million five hundred and twenty-three thousand three hundred and seventy-six dollars to the service of the year One thousand nine hundred and sixty-five and One thousand nine hundred and sixty-six.
Lotteries Gaming and Betting Act 1966	No. 7429	24 May 1966
An Act to re-enact with Amendments the Law relating to Lotteries Gaming and Betting.
Protection of Animals Act 1966	No. 7432	24 May 1966
An Act to re-enact with Amendments the Law relating to the Protection of Animals.
	No. 7434	30 September 1966
An Act to apply out of the Consolidated Revenue the sum of Ninety-nine million nine hundred and seventy-two thousand two hundred dollars to the service of the year One thousand nine hundred and sixty-six and One thousand nine hundred and sixty-seven.
Provincial Sewerage Authorities Association of Victoria Act 1966	No. 7436	11 October 1966
An Act to make Provision with respect to the Incorporation of the Provincial Sewerage Authorities Association of Victoria.
Maffra Lands Exchange Act 1966	No. 7438	11 October 1966
An Act to provide for the Revocation of the Reservations of certain Lands in the Township of Maffra temporarily reserved as Sites for a Municipal Depot and a Children's Playground respectively, for the Exchange thereof for certain other Land in the said Township and for the Reservation of that other Land for the Purposes of Public Recreation and a Children's Playground, and for other purposes.
Tattersall Consultations Act 1966	No. 7440	11 October 966
An Act to amend the Tattersall Consultations Act 1958 (Note: Tattersall Consultations Act 1958 (No. 6390)) and for other purposes.
Public Authorities (Contributions) Act 1966	No. 7441	18 October 1966
An Act to require certain Public Authorities to make Contributions in aid of the Consolidated Revenue and for other purposes.
Lower Yarra Crossing Authority (Guarantee) Act 1966	No. 7443	25 October 1966
An Act to amend the Lower Yarra Crossing Authority Act 1965 (Note: Lower Yarra Crossing Authority Act 1965 (No. 7365)) and for other purposes.
Moorpanyal Lands Exchange Act 1966	No. 7445	2 November 1966
An Act to provide upon the Surrender to Her Majesty of certain Land in the Parish of Moorpanyal for the Reservation thereof for Hospital Purposes and for the Grant of certain other Land in the said Parish.
North Melbourne Lands Act 1966	No. 7446	2 November 1966
An Act relating to certain Lands at North Melbourne.
Marine (Amendment) Act 1966	No. 7447	15 November 1966
An Act to amend Sections 8 and 261 of the Marine Act 1958. (Note: Marine Act 1958 (No. 6302))
Public Account (Bona Vacantia) Act 1966	No. 7450	15 November 1966
An Act to amend the Public Account Act 1958. (Note: Public Account Act 1958 (No. 6345))
Long Island Country Club Act 1966	No. 7458	22 November 1966
An Act to authorize the Registrar of Companies to transfer certain Land to Long Island Country Club Limited.
San Remo Lands Act 1966	No. 7461	22 November 1966
An Act to provide upon the Surrender to Her Majesty of certain Land in the Township of San Remo for the Reservation thereof as a Site for Public Recreation, and for the Revocation of the Reservation of certain other Land in the said Township temporarily reserved as a Site for Public Recreation, and for the Grant thereof to the President Councillors and Ratepayers of the Shire of Bass, and for other purposes.
Constitution Act Amendment (Conjoint Elections) Act 1966	No. 7462	29 November 1966
An Act to amend The Constitution Act Amendment Act 1958 with respect to the Holding and Conduct of Conjoint Elections.
Morwell National Park Act 1966	No. 7465	29 November 1966
An Act to validate the Purchase by the President Councillors and Ratepayers of the Shire of Morwell of certain Land in the Parish of Yinnar and to provide that upon the Surrender thereof to Her Majesty the said Land shall be reserved as a Site for a National Park under the Land Act 1958 (Note: Land Act 1958 (No. 6284)) and declared to be a National Park under the National Parks Act 1958 (Note: National Parks Act 1958 (No. 6326)) and for other purposes.
Revocation and Excision of Crown Reservations Act 1966	No. 7470	6 December 1966
An Act to revoke the Permanent Reservations and Crown Grants of certain Lands, and for other purposes.
Victorian Pipelines Commission Act 1966 (repealed)	No. 7477	6 December 1966
An Act to establish a Victorian Pipelines Commission to make Provision with respect to the Operation of Pipelines in Victoria and for other purposes. (Repealed by Gas and Fuel Corporation (Pipelines) Act 1971 (No. 8122))
State Insurance (Payments into Court) Act 1966	No. 7481	13 December 1966
An Act to authorize the Insurance Commissioner to execute Bonds for the purpose of paying Money into Court in certain Cases, and for other purposes.
National Gallery of Victoria Act 1966	No. 7482	13 December 1966
An Act to constitute a Council of Trustees of the National Gallery of Victoria and for other purposes.
Appeal Costs Fund (Amendment) Act 1966	No. 7488	13 December 1966
An Act to amend the Appeal Costs Fund Act 1964, (Note: Appeal Costs Fund Act 1964 (No. 7117)) and for other purposes.
State Coal Mine Act 1966 (repealed)	No. 7492	13 December 1966
An Act to make Provision concerning Mine Workers employed in the State Coal Mine at Wonthaggi in view of the diminishing extent of Mining Operations being carried on at the said Mine and the proposed Closing of the Power House thereat. (Repealed by Legislation Reform (Repeals No. 2) Act 2008 (No. 16 of 2008))
Private Agents Act 1966	No. 7494	13 December 1966
An Act to license and control Private Agents.
Local Government Act 1966	No. 7495	13 December 1966
An Act to amend the Local Government Act 1958 (Note: Local Government Act 1958 (No. 6299)) and for other purposes.
Port Phillip Authority Act 1966	No. 7498	20 December 1966
An Act to constitute an Authority to be known as the Port Phillip Authority to make Provision with respect to the Co-ordination of the Development of Port Phillip and certain other Areas and for other purposes.
Extractive Industries Act 1966	No. 7499	20 December 1966
An Act relating to Extractive Industries and for other purposes.
	No. 7508	20 December 1966
An Act to apply out of the Consolidated Revenue the sum of Two million one hundred and ninety-one thousand nine hundred and seventy-two dollars to the service of the year One thousand nine hundred and sixty-five and One thousand nine hundred and sixty-six.
Constitution Act Amendment (Postal Voting) Act 1966	No. 7510	20 December 1966
An Act to amend The Constitution Act Amendment Act 1958.
Inflammable Liquids Act 1966 (repealed)	No. 7512	20 December 1966
An Act to regulate the Storage and Transportation of Inflammable Liquids, to make Provision for the Testing of Inflammable Liquids and of Apparatus used in connexion therewith, and for other purposes. (Repealed by Dangerous Goods Act 1985 (No. 10189))
Water Supply Loan Application Act 1966 (repealed)	No. 7513	20 December 1966
An Act to sanction the Issue and Application of Loan Money for Works and other Purposes relating to Irrigation Water Supply Drainage Sewerage Flood Protection and River Improvement, and other purposes. (Repealed by Treasury Legislation (Repeal) Act 2005 (No. 73 of 2005))
	No. 7514	20 December 1966
An Act to apply a sum out of the Consolidated Revenue to the service of the year ending on the thirtieth day of June One thousand nine hundred and sixty-seven and to appropriate the Supplies granted in this and the last preceding Session of Parliament.
Barley Marketing (Amendment) Act 1966	No.	
Bees Act 1966	No.	
Boilers Inspection (Amendment) Act 1966	No.	
Building Societies (Amendment) Act 1966	No.	
Co-operation (Amendment) Act 1966	No.	
Co-operative Housing Societies (Amendment) Act 1966	No.	
Co-operative Housing Societies (Financial) Act 1966	No.	
Commercial Goods Vehicles (Tow Trucks) Act 1966	No.	
Commonwealth and States Financial Agreement Act 1966	No.	
Companies (Amendment) Act 1966	No.	
Companies (Defaulting Officers) Act 1966	No.	
Companies Act 1966	No.	
Country Fire Authority (Borrowing Powers) Act 1966	No.	
Country Fire Authority (Fire Prevention) Act 1966	No.	
Country Fire Authority (Interstate Fire Brigades) Act 1966	No.	
Country Roads (Level Crossings) (Amendment) Act 1966	No.	
County Court (Common Law Jurisdiction) Act 1966	No.	
Crimes (Dangerous Driving) Act 1966	No.	
Estate Agents (Amendment) Act 1966	No.	
Evidence (Foreign Tribunals) Act 1966	No.	
Evidence (Medical Evidence) Act 1966	No.	
Firearms (Amendment) Act 1966	No.	
Firearms (Competition Weapons) Act 1966	No.	
Fisheries and Game (Amendment) Act 1966	No.	
Forests (Wood Pulp Agreement) Act 1966	No.	
Friendly Societies (Amendment) Act 1966	No.	
Gaols (Commencement of Sentences) Act 1966	No.	
Gas and Fuel Corporation (Borrowing) Act 1966	No.	
Geelong Harbor Trust (Amendment) Act 1966	No.	
Geelong Waterworks and Sewerage (Amendment) Act 1966	No.	
Grain Elevators (Amendment) Act 1966	No.	
Grain Elevators (Further Amendment) Act 1966	No.	
Health (Amendment) Act 1966	No.	
Horse Breeding (Amendment) Act 1966	No.	
Hospitals and Charities (Liability of Patients) Act 1966	No.	
Housing (Commonwealth and State Agreement) Act 1966	No.	
Juries Act 1966	No.	
Labour and Industry (Amendment) Act 1966	No.	
Labour and Industry (Petrol Shops) Act 1966	No.	
Labour and Industry (Sheltered Workshops) Act 1966	No.	
Land (Plantation Areas) Act 1966	No.	
Land Tax (Rates) Act 1966	No.	
Legal Profession Practice (Amendment) Act 1966	No.	
Legal Profession Practice (Further Amendment) Act 1966	No.	
Limitation of Actions (Notice of Action) Act 1966	No.	
Marine Stores and Old Metals (Collectors) Act 1966	No.	
Marketable Securities Act 1966	No.	
Marketing of Primary Products (Maize Marketing Board) Act 1966	No.	
Marketing of Primary Products (Onion Marketing Board) Act 1966	No.	
Marketing of Primary Products (Tobacco Leaf Marketing Board) Act 1966	No.	
Medical (Foreign Practitioners Qualification Committee) Act 1966	No.	
Melbourne and Metropolitan Board of Works (Amendment) Act 1966	No.	
Melbourne and Metropolitan Board of Works (Reconstitution) Act 1966	No.	
Melbourne Cricket Ground (Guarantees) Act 1966	No.	
Mildura Irrigation and Water Trusts (Amendment) Act 1966	No.	
Milk Board (Amendment) Act 1966	No.	
Milk Pasteurization (Amendment) Act 1966	No.	
Money Lenders (Exemption) Act 1966	No.	
Motor Car (Hospitals and Charities Contributions) Act 1966	No.	
Motor Car (Trailers) Act 1966	No.	
Motor Car Act 1966	No.	
Nurses (Amendment) Act 1966	No.	
Portland Harbor Trust (Railways) Act 1966	No.	
Property Law (Loans to Minors) Act 1966	No.	
Public Works Loan Application Act 1966	No.	
Racing (Amendment) Act 1966	No.	
Racing (Totalizator Percentages) Act 1966	No.	
Railway Loan Application Act 1966	No.	
Revenue Deficits Funding Act 1966	No.	
Settlement Purchase Leases Act 1966	No.	
Sewerage Districts (Amendment) Act 1966	No.	
Soil Conservation and Land Utilization (Advisory Council) Act 1966	No.	
Stamps (Mortgages) Act 1966	No.	
Stamps Act 1966	No.	
State Accident Insurance Office Land Act 1966	No.	
State Electricity Commission (Amendment) Act 1966	No.	
State Forests Loan Application Act 1966	No.	
Stock and Share Brokers (Amendment) Act 1966	No.	
Teaching Service (Married Women) Act 1966	No.	
Tobacco Leaf Industry Stabilization Act 1966	No.	
Tobacco Leaf Marketing Board (Appointment of Manager) Act 1966	No.	
Trewalla Lands Exchange Act 1966	No.	
Vegetation and Vine Diseases (Amendment) Act 1966	No.	
Vermin and Noxious Weeds (Financial) Act 1966	No.	
Water (Amendment) Act 1966	No.	
Water (Rating by Area) Act 1966	No.	
Waterworks Trusts Association of Victoria Act 1966	No.	
Wrongs (Assessment of Damages) Act 1966	No.	

== Sources ==
- "1966 Victorian Historical Acts". AustLII.
