= Bulli mine disaster =

1887 incident in Bulli, New South Wales, Australia

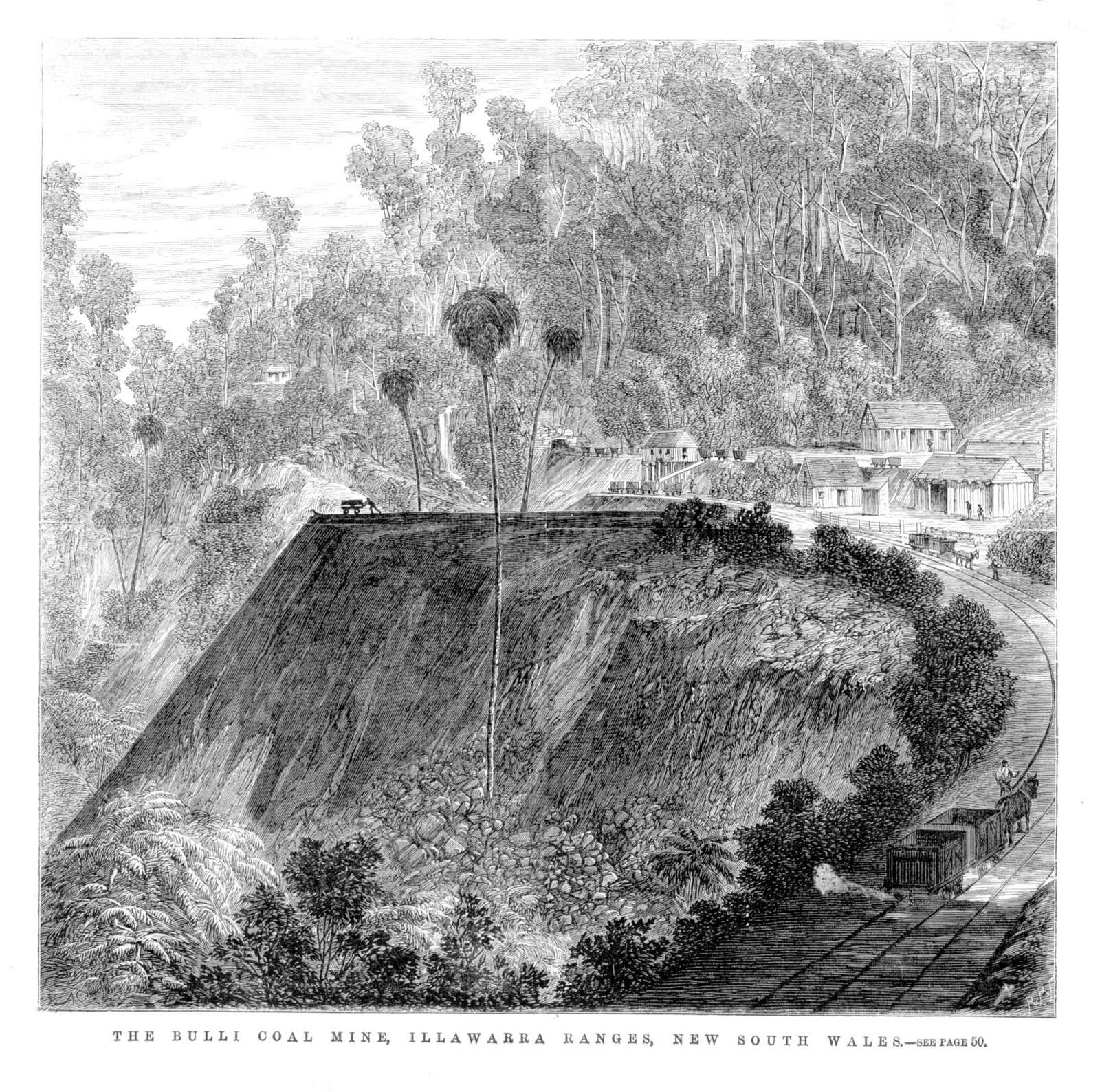
Sketch of the Bulli Coal Mine 16 years before the disaster, 1871

The Bulli mine disaster occurred on 23 March 1887 at the Bulli Colliery in Bulli, New South Wales, Australia. A gas explosion blew out the tunnel mouth and resulted in the deaths of eighty-one men and boys. It is the second worst mining disaster in Australian history after the 1902 Mount Kembla mine disaster.

== Background ==
The Bulli Coal Mining Company was founded in 1863, loading its first shipment of coal on 22 June 1863.

The coal seams in Bulli are part of the Sydney Basin. Whilst the coal seams are far too deep in Sydney for their mining to be a viable economic proposition, the coal seams are closer to the surface in the Illawarra area.

The Bulli Seam was known at the time of the disaster as the '8 foot seam', and by the late 1800s was considered the easiest in the area to work as it had the thickest and most saleable coal. Despite the gaseous nature of the seam, the Bulli Coal Mining Company decided to mine the Bulli Seam in 1884.

In January 1887, the owners of the Bulli Colliery decided to recruit non-unionised labour from Sydney due to local industrial disputes in 1886.

== Disaster ==
On Wednesday 23 March 1887, at 2:30pm, an explosion occurred at the Bulli Colliery.

The miners who survived the initial force of the explosion succumbed to the effects of asphyxiant afterdamp.

== Public inquiry ==
The New South Wales government was "embarrassed by the press of the day" and called for a Royal Commission into the disaster.

The Commission found that the explosion was likely caused by a naked light or overcharged shot igniting a pocket of gas, which resulted in a larger explosion of coal dust. The presence of a high amount of coal-dust in the atmosphere and the confined spaces of the mine both intensified the force of the explosion.

The Commission blamed Jerry Westwood or his colleage, who at the time of the explosion were working at the No.2 coal face. They believe one of these two men prepared and fired the shot that in the opinion of the Commission, "was the immediate or primary cause of the explosion".

== Aftermath ==
In 1895, the Bulli Colliery was sold to George Adams, the founder of Tattersall's.

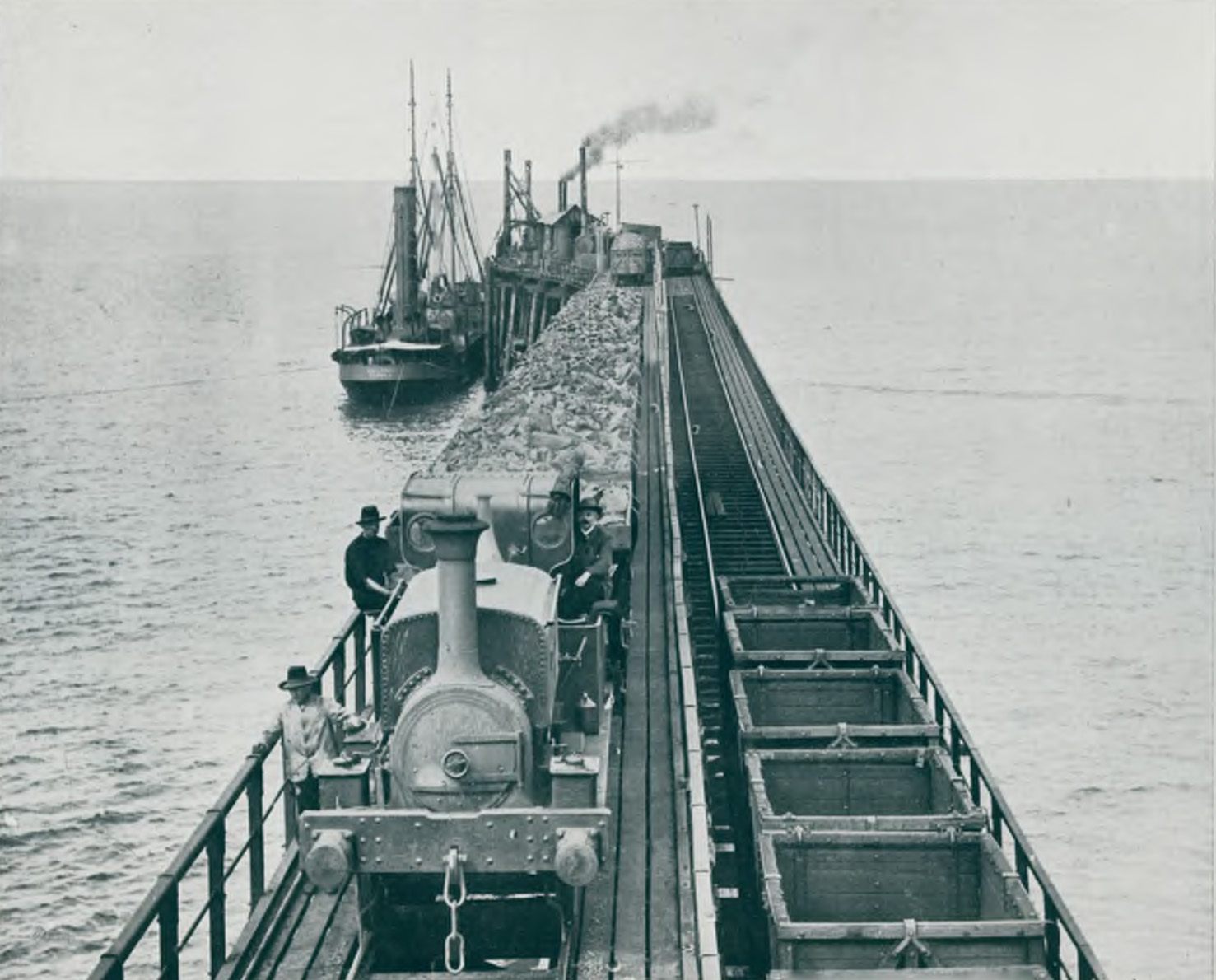
Coal being loaded from the Bulli Jetty at Bellambi Harbour, where Bulli Colliery coal was exported from at the time of the disaster, 1909

The colliery was resold to Australian Iron & Steel in 1936, which itself had been purchased in 1935 by BHP.

During the height of World War II, in April 1944, BHP commenced work on the Bulli No. 2 shaft.

On 15 May 1987, the Bulli Colliery ceased production at midday after 124 years of production.
