= List of acts of the Parliament of Victoria from 1964 =

This is a list of acts of the Parliament of Victoria, Australia for the year 1964.

== 1964 ==
Short title, or popular name	Citation	Royal assent
Long title
Governor's Salary Act 1964	No. 7106	11 March 1964 (Note: This act was reserved for approval by Her Majesty.)
An Act to amend Section Ten of The Constitution Act Amendment Act 1958. (Note: Constitution Act Amendment Act 1958 (No. 6224))
Constitution Act Amendment (Conjoint Elections) Act 1964	No. 7109	1 April 1964
An Act to amend The Constitution Act Amendment Act 1958 with respect to the Holding and Conduct of Elections, and for other purposes.
Opticians Registration (Fees and Penalties) Act 1964	No. 7110	1 April 1964
An Act to amend Sections Fourteen and Twenty-two of the Opticians Registration Act 1958. (Note: Optometrists Registration Act 1958 (No. 6329))
Railway Lands Act 1964 or the Railway Lands Act 1963 (repealed)	No. 7111	14 April 1964
An Act relating to certain Lands of The Victorian Railways Commissioners. (Repealed by Transport Act 1983 (No. 9921))
R.S.L. Widows and Widowed Mothers' Trust Patriotic Fund Act 1964 (Note: RSL is a reference to the Returned and Services League.) (repealed)	No. 7115	22 April 1964
An Act to ratify and approve a certain Deed of Trust relating to certain Assets held on Trusts declared by the State War Council of Victoria and for other purposes. (Repealed by Statute Law Revision Act 2013 (No. 70 of 2013)
Appeal Costs Fund Act 1964 or the Appeal Costs Act 1964 (repealed)	No. 7117	28 April 1964
An Act to make Provision with respect to the Liability for Costs of certain Litigation, to establish an Appeal Costs Fund to meet such Liability, to appoint an Appeal Costs Board, and for Purposes connected therewith. (Repealed by Appeal Costs Act 1998 (No. 87 of 1998))
Evangelical Lutheran Church of Australia (Victorian District) Incorporation Act 1964	No. 7121	28 April 1964
An Act to incorporate The Evangelical Lutheran Church of Australia (Victorian District) and for other purposes.
Athlone Mechanics' Institute Land Act 1964	No. 7129	5 May 1964
An Act relating to certain Land in the Parish of Longwarry held in Trust for the Members of the Athlone Mechanics' Institute.
	No. 7133	5 May 1964
An Act to apply out of the Consolidated Revenue the sum of Fourteen million and fifty-nine thousand one hundred and thirty pounds to the service of the year One thousand nine hundred and sixty-four and One thousand nine hundred and sixty-five.
University (Faculties) Act 1964	No. 7141	5 May 1964
An Act to amend Section Twenty-nine of the University Act 1958. (Note: University Act 1958 (No. 6405))
Statute Law Revision Act 1964	No. 7142	5 May 1964
An Act to revise the Statute Law.
Litter Act 1964 (repealed)	No. 7145	5 May 1964
An Act to make Provision for the Abatement of Litter and for other purposes. (Repealed by Litter Act 1987 (No. 54 of 1987))
Acts Interpretation (Commencement) Act 1964	No. 7146	5 May 1964
An Act to amend Section Four of the Acts Interpretation Act 1958. (Note: Acts Interpretation Act 1958 (No. 6189))
Adoption of Children Act 1964	No. 7147	5 May 1964
An Act relating to the Adoption of Children and for Purposes connected therewith.
National Parks Act 1964	No. 7148	5 May 1964
An Act to reserve certain Land of the Crown as a Site for a National Park, to authorize the Appointment of the National Parks Authority as Sole Trustee of a certain Cemetery, to make Provision with respect to the Erection of a Memorial Cairn in Wilson's Promontory National Park, and for other purposes.
Constitution Act Amendment (Responsible Ministers) Act 1964	No. 7149	15 July 1964
An Act to make Provision for increasing the Number of Responsible Ministers of the Crown.
	No. 7150	21 July 1964
An Act to apply out of the Consolidated Revenue the sum of Forty million eight hundred and sixty thousand nine hundred and ten pounds to the service of the year One thousand nine hundred and sixty-four and One thousand nine hundred and sixty-five.
Agricultural Colleges Act 1964	No. 7165	27 October 1964
An Act to amend the Agricultural Colleges Act 1958, (Note: Agricultural Colleges Act 1958 (No. 6194)) to validate certain Regulations, to excise certain Areas from Land permanently reserved as a Site for the Purposes of a State Agricultural College, and for other purposes.
	No. 7167	29 October 1964
An Act to apply out of the Consolidated Revenue the sum of Twenty-nine million three hundred and forty thousand six hundred and eighty pounds to the service of the year One thousand nine hundred and sixty-four and One thousand nine hundred and sixty-five.
Administration and Probate (Small Estates) Act 1964	No. 7168	10 November 1964
An Act to amend Part II. of the Administration and Probate Act 1958. (Note: Administration and Probate Act 1958 (No. 6191))
Game (Black Swans) Act 1964	No. 7169	17 November 1964
An Act to amend Section Thirty-five of the Game Act 1958 (Note: Game Act 1958 (No. 6258)) to authorize the Issue of Licences to take or kill Black Swans.
	No. 7175	24 November 1964
An Act to apply out of the Consolidated Revenue the sum of Two million and eighty-seven thousand four hundred and sixty-eight pounds to the service of the year One thousand nine hundred and sixty-three and One thousand nine hundred and sixty-four.
Revocation and Excision of Crown Reservations Act 1964	No. 7179	24 November 1964
An Act to revoke the Permanent Reservations of certain Lands, and for other purposes.
	No. 7185	10 December 1968
An Act to apply a sum out of the Consolidated Revenue to the service of the year ending on the thirtieth day of June One thousand nine hundred and sixty-nine and to appropriate the Supplies granted in this and the last preceding Session of Parliament.
Pesticides Act 1964	No. 7188	9 December 1964
An Act to alter the Title of and to amend the Fungicides Act 1958. (Note: Fungicides Act 1958 (No. 6257))
La Trobe University Act 1964	No. 7189	9 December 1964
An Act for the Establishment and Incorporation of a University to be known as La Trobe University and for other purposes.
National Parks (Amendment) Act 1964	No. 7190	9 December 1964
An Act to amend the National Parks Act 1958. (Note: National Parks Act 1958 (No. 6326))
Tattersall Consultations (Jackpot Consultations) Act 1964	No. 7196	9 December 1964
An Act to amend the Tattersall Consultations Act 1958 (Note: Tattersall Consultations Act 1958 (No. 6390)) with respect to Accumulating Prizes and for Purposes connected therewith.
Acquisition of Materials Act 1964	No. 7203	15 December 1964
An Act to amend Section Fifty of the Country Roads Act 1958 (Note: Country Roads Act 1958 (No. 6229)) Section Sixty-three of the Lands Compensation Act 1958 (Note: Lands Compensation Act 1958 (No. 6286)) Section Six hundred and fifty-eight of the Local Government Act 1958 (Note: Local Government Act 1958 (No. 6299)) and Section Three hundred and eight of the Water Act 1958. (Note: Water Act 1958 (No. 6413))
Monash University (Amendment) Act 1964	No. 7217	15 December 1964
An Act to amend the Monash University Act 1958 (Note: Monash University Act 1958 (No. 6184)) and for other purposes.
Water Supply Loan Application Act 1964 (repealed)	No. 7218	15 December 1964
An Act to sanction the Issue and Application of Loan Money for Works and other Purposes relating to Irrigation Water Supply Drainage Sewerage Flood Protection and River Improvement, and for other purposes. (Repealed by Treasury Legislation (Repeal) Act 2005 (No. 73 of 2005))
Cadet Surveyors Act 1964 (repealed)	No. 7221	15 December 1964
An Act to make Provision for Cadetships for Persons seeking to complete University Courses in Surveying, and for other purposes. Template:Mall
Tomato Processing Industry (Uniform Agreement) Act 1964	No. 7223	15 December 1964
An Act to improve Stability in the Tomato Processing Industry.
Public Lands and Works Act 1964 (repealed)	No. 7228	15 December 1964
An Act to dissolve the Board of Land and Works, to make Provision with respect to Property vested in or held by the said Board and its Powers Functions and Obligations, to validate certain Acts and Contracts of the said Board and to change the Titles of the Commissioner of Crown Lands and Survey and the Commissioner of Public Works respectively, and for other purposes. (Repealed by Project Development and Construction Management Act 1994 (No. 101 of 1994))
Decentralization Advisory Committee Act 1964	No. 7232	22 December 1964
An Act to establish The Decentralization Advisory Committee and for Purposes connected therewith.
Shell (Corio to Williamstown) Pipelines Act 1964	No. 7236	22 December 1964
An Act to authorize and facilitate the Construction and Operation of a Pipeline for the Transportation of Petroleum and Petroleum Products from or to the Refinery of Shell Refining (Australia) Proprietary Limited at Corio and for other purposes.
Consumers Protection Act 1964	No. 7237	22 December 1964
An Act to constitute a Consumers Protection Council and for other purposes.
Balmoral Geelong and Balwyn Lands Exchange Act 1964	No.	
Boilers Inspection (Amendment) Act 1964	No.	
Cancer (Amendment) Act 1964	No.	
Children's Court (Amendment) Act 1964	No.	
Closer Settlement (Regulations) Act 1964	No.	
Co-operative Housing Societies (Indemnities) Act 1964	No.	
Country Fire Authority (Borrowing Powers) Act 1964	No.	
Country Roads (Amendment) Act 1964	No.	
Crimes (Amendment) Act 1964	No.	
Disposal of Uncollected Goods (Damaged Motor Cars) Act 1964	No.	
Education (Adult Education) Act 1964	No.	
Education (School Committees) Act 1964	No.	
Estate Agents (Amendment) Act 1964	No.	
Estate Agents Act 1964	No.	
Firearms (Interstate Transactions) Act 1964	No.	
Fisheries and Game (Reduced Licence Fees) Act 1964	No.	
Forests (Amendment) Act 1964	No.	
Friendly Societies (Assignment of Contracts) Act 1964	No.	
Gaols (Visiting Justices) Act 1964	No.	
General Sessions (Pensions of Chairmen) Act 1964	No.	
Goods (Trading Stamps) Act 1964	No.	
Grain Elevators (Borrowing Powers) Act 1964	No.	
Grain Elevators (Borrowing) Act 1964	No.	
Health (Amendment) Act 1964	No.	
Health (Child Minding) Act 1964	No.	
Health (Offensive Trades) Act 1964	No.	
Home Finance (Reconstitution of Trust) Act 1964	No.	
Housing (Amendment) Act 1964	No.	
Housing Advances and Loans (Improper Commissions) Act 1964	No.	
Juries (Women Jurors) Act 1964	No.	
Justices (Complaints and Summonses) Act 1964	No.	
Labour and Industry (Chemists' Shops) Act 1964	No.	
Labour and Industry (Fees) Act 1964	No.	
Labour and Industry (Long Service Leave) Act 1964	No.	
Land (Special Grant) Act 1964	No.	
Land Tax (Rates and Exemptions) Act 1964	No.	
Latrobe Valley (Amendment) Act 1964	No.	
Legal Profession Practice (Amendment) Act 1964	No.	
Licensing (Dining Permits) Act 1964	No.	
Local Authorities Superannuation (Amendment) Act 1964	No.	
Local Government (Councillors' Declarations) Act 1964	No.	
Local Government (St. Kilda and Elwood Land Reclamation) Act 1964	No.	
Maintenance (Reciprocating State) Act 1964	No.	
Marine (Amendment) Act 1964	No.	
Marine Stores and Old Metals (Welfare and Community Organizations) Act 1964	No.	
Maryborough Free Library and Literary Institute Act 1964	No.	
Medical (Amendment) Act 1964	No.	
Melbourne Sailors' Home Act 1964	No.	
Metropolitan Fire Brigades (Long Service Leave) Act 1964	No.	
Mildura (Rating on Unimproved Values) Act 1964	No.	
Mines (Exploration Licences) Act 1964	No.	
Motor Car (Amendment) Act 1964	No.	
Motor Car (Carriers' Identification Marks) Act 1964	No.	
Motor Car (Fines and Drivers' Licence Fees) Act 1964	No.	
Motor Car (Hours of Driving) Act 1964	No.	
Motor Car (Indorsement of Licences) Act 1964	No.	
Municipal Association (Accident Insurance) Act 1964	No.	
Parliamentary Salaries Pensions and Superannuation Act 1964	No.	
Police Offences (Animals) Act 1964	No.	
Police Offences (Betting Information) Act 1964	No.	
Portland Harbor Trust (Borrowing Powers) Act 1964	No.	
Process Servers and Inquiry Agents (Qualification) Act 1964	No.	
Public Service (Amendment) Act 1964	No.	
Racing (Amendment) Act 1964	No.	
Racing (Interstate Totalizators) Act 1964	No.	
Railway Loan Application Act 1964	No.	
Railways (Funds) Act 1964	No.	
Railways (Long Service Leave) Act 1964	No.	
Sewerage Districts Act 1964	No.	
Sheep Owners Protection (Amendment) Act 1964	No.	
Social Welfare (Trainees) Act 1964	No.	
South Melbourne (Unimproved Rating Poll) Act 1964	No.	
Stamps (Exemptions) Act 1964	No.	
Stamps (Motor Car) Act 1964	No.	
Stamps Act 1964	No.	
State Electricity Commission (Contributions) Act 1964	No.	
State Forests Loan Application Act 1964	No.	
State Insurance Funds Act 1964	No.	
Stock Foods (Amendment) Act 1964	No.	
Superannuation (Time for Election) Act 1964	No.	
Supreme Court (Qualification of Judges) Act 1964	No.	
Swine Compensation Act 1964	No.	
Teaching Service (Amendment) Act 1964	No.	
Theatres (Sunday Films) Act 1964	No.	
Transfer of Land (Restrictive Covenants) Act 1964	No.	
Transfer of Land (Service Agreements) Act 1964	No.	
Trustee Companies (Affidavits) Act 1964	No.	
Valuation of Land (Valuations) Act 1964	No.	
Water (Recreational Areas) Act 1964	No.	
Water Act 1964	No.	
Wills (Formal Validity) Act 1964	No.	
Wodonga Sewerage Authority (Acquisition of Land) Act 1964	No.	

== Sources ==
- "1964 Victorian Historical Acts". AustLII.
