= Ashley Youth Detention Centre =

Correctional facility in Tasmania, Australia

- Interactive map of Ashley Youth Detention Centre
- Location: Deloraine, Tasmania; 41.5227°S 146.7031°E
- Status: Operational
- Security class: Maximum, for juvenile males and females
- Capacity: 51
- Opened: 2000
- Managed by: Tasmanian Government

The Ashley Youth Detention Centre is a youth detention centre outside Deloraine, Tasmania, Australia. It is the only such centre in Tasmania and has a capacity of 51 beds for minors – aged from 10 to 18 years – convicted of crimes, or on pre-trial remand. In September 2021, in response to ongoing complaints of sexual and physical abuse at the facility, the Premier of Tasmania announced that the centre would be replaced within three years. A commission of inquiry into child sexual abuse in Tasmanian institutions, which examined allegations of child maltreatment at the centre, began in October 2021. The commission published its report in September 2023. The Tasmanian government accepted all of the report's recommendations, and committed to implementing a new youth justice policy in line with the commission's findings.

== History ==
The site was originally an experimental agricultural school, similar to the one at nearby Hagley, that opened in 1914 as the State Farm. The experiment was not successful and the school closed. The site was subdivided in 1922 and 90 acres (36 ha) set aside for a boys' home. The original 1913 building was retained for accommodation of the boys, and cottages kept for staff. From 1869 youth offenders had been housed in the Boys' Training School in Hobart. In 1922 the Deloraine school site was reopened as the Ashley Home for Boys, taking over the Hobart facility's function, first focusing on farm work as a reform method. It has remained as a youth detention centre since, and became known as the Ashley Youth Detention Centre in 2000.

== Child abuse ==
In September 2021, amidst allegations of child sexual and other abuse, pending legal action by former detainees, and a staff sexual harassment complaint, the Premier of Tasmania announced that the centre would close within three years, to be replaced by two new, smaller facilities. The plans for two separate facilities were later dropped, with a single "therapeutically focused" youth justice facility to be located at Pontville, north of Hobart, proposed instead.

=== Inquiry ===
A commission of inquiry (COI; formerly called state royal commissions) into child sexual abuse in Tasmanian institutions, which would consider allegations against the centre, along with abuse in Tasmanian schools, in health services, and in out-of-home care (foster care) programmes, began in October 2021. As part of the inquiry, the commission engaged researchers at the Australian Centre for Child Protection, University of South Australia and the Institute of Child Protection Studies at Australian Catholic University to conduct a study; the researchers worked with children and young people involved in government-run or -funded institutions in Tasmania, including the Ashley Youth Detention Centre. Their research report was published in February 2023.

In 2022, the inquiry revealed that 55 workers at the centre had been accused of child sex abuse by former child detainees. One former worker was accused of abusing eleven children over the course of three decades. Another former staff member was accused of using sexual violence and intimidation, including forced masturbation, against 26 former child detainees. The alleged crimes span from recent years back to the 1970s.

The commission submitted its final report to the Tasmanian government in September 2023. In response, the government published a response accepting all 191 recommendations contained in the commission's report. In implementing the recommendations, a new youth justice policy was introduced; the government publishes reports on its implementation progress. A new youth detention facility is planned, to be located at Pontville. Community consultation on the proposal is due to end in April 2026. In the meantime, the Ashley Youth Detention Centre remains in operation.
