= List of Tasmanian royal commissions =

This is a list of royal commissions and commissions of inquiry appointed by the Government of Tasmania.

- 1863: Royal Commission of inquiry into the mode of keeping the public accounts, and into the various departments of the Government
- 1868: Royal Commission on the Main Line Railway
- 1882: Royal Commission on Fisheries
- 1883: Royal Commission on Education
- 1889: Royal Commission on Charitable Institutions
- 1892: Royal Commission on the Bank of Van Diemen's Land
- 1915: Royal Commission into public debts sinking fund
- 1916: Royal Commission on Fisheries
- 1955: Royal commission into the University of Tasmania, relating to the Sydney Orr case
- 1966–1968: Royal Commission into the Fluoridation of Public Water Supplies
- 1991: Royal Commission into an Attempt to Bribe a Member of the House of Assembly, relating to the Edmund Rouse case
- 2021–2023: Commission of Inquiry into the Tasmanian Government's Responses to Child Sexual Abuse in Institutional Settings

== See also ==
- List of Australian royal commissions
