= List of Western Australian royal commissions =

This is a list of royal commissions appointed by the Government of Western Australia since 1934:

Name	Commissioner	Years
Royal Commission Appointed to Investigate, Report and Advise Upon Matters in Relation to the Condition and Treatment of Aborigines	Henry D. Moseley	1934–1935
Royal Commission on the Electoral Act, 1907–1921 and Other Relative Matters	John C. Willcock	1935
Bulk Handling of Wheat Royal Commission	William C. Angwin	1935
Royal Commission on Money-Lending and Hire-Purchase Traders	Henry D. Moseley	1936
Royal Commission on the Claremont Hospital for the Insane	Henry D. Moseley	1936
Royal Commission Investigating Certain Charges of Corruption	Percy L. Hart	1937–1938
Royal Commission on Youth Employment and the Apprenticeship System	Albert Wolff	1937–1938
Royal Commission on Light Lands and Poison-Infested Lands	Charles G. Latham	1938
Royal Commission into the Heathcote Mental Reception Home and the Administration of Mental Hospitals Generally	Henry D. Moseley	1938
Royal Commission on the South-West National Power Scheme	Frank E. Shaw	1938–1940
Royal Commission into the Administration of the Municipal Council of the City of Perth	Howard S. Raphael	1938
Royal Commissioner on Stored Wheat	Albert Wolff	1940
Royal Commission on Coal Supplies and Development in the Collie Coalfields	Richard C. Wilson	1940
Royal Commission into the Financial and Economic Position of the Pastoral industry in the Leasehold areas in Western Australia	Wallace V. Fyfe	1940
Royal Commission on the Administration of the University of Western Australia	Albert Wolff	1941–1942
Royal Commission on the Provisions of the Companies Bill	Emil Nulsen	1941
Royal Commission into the Care and Reform of Youthful Delinquents	Hal Colebatch	1943
Royal Commission on Personal Covenants in Mortgages of Land	John E. Shillington	1945
Royal Commission on the Vermin Act	Arthur F. Watts	1945
Royal Commission to Ascertain the Next-of-Kin of Leslie Adamson	Leslie W. Stotter	1945
Royal Commission into the Australian Standard Garratt Locomotive	Albert Wolff	1945–1946
Royal Commission into the Administration, Conduct and Control of the Sport of Trotting in the State of Western Australia	Charles McLean	1946
Royal Commission on the Timber Industry (Housing of Employees) Bill	Herbert H. Styants	1946
Royal Commission on the Development of the Outports of the State	Herbert H. Styants	1946
Royal Commission into the Coal Mining Industry of Western Australia	William J. Wallwork	1947
Royal Commission on Wheat Marketing and Stabilisation in Western Australia	John S. Teasdale	1947
Royal Commission on Workers' Compensation	George W. Simpson	1947–1948
Royal Commission into the Management, Workings and Control of the Western Australian Government Railways	Alexander J. Gibson	1947–1948
Royal Commission into the Financial and Economic Position of the Milk Industry in Western Australia	William E. Stannard	1947–1948
Royal Commission on the State Housing Commission	Henry D. Moseley	1947–1948
Royal Commission on Municipal Boundaries	Emanuel H. Rosman	1947–1949
Royal Commission on Betting	Charles McLean	1948
Royal Commission into Some Aspects of the Administration of the Police Force of Western Australia Under the Commissioner of Police	C. H. Book	1948–1949
Royal Commission into the Fishing Industry of Western Australia	Hugh A. Leslie	1949
Royal Commission into Bran, Pollard and Stock Food Concentrates	Leslie C. Nimmo	1949
Royal Commission on the Local Government Bill	A. E. White	1950
Royal Commission into Alleged Cases of Brutality at the Claremont Mental Hospital	Adrian H. Curlewis	1950
Royal Commission into Forestry and Timber matters in Western Australia	G. J. Rodger	1951
Royal Commission into the Effect Generally of the Application of Lime with Super upon the Fertility of the Soil	John M. Hearman	1951–1952
Royal Commission into the Efficacy of the Agricultural Practices of Mr Eric Farleigh	John M. Hearman	1951
Royal Commission on the Town Planning and Development Act Amendment Bill 1951	Harry Hearn	1952
Royal Commission on Kindergartens	Robert R. McDonald	1952–1953
Royal Commission into Allegations against Snowden and Willson Proprietary Limited, and Snowden and Willson (Housebuilders) Proprietary Limited	Alan G. Smith	1952–1953
Royal Commission into Allegations of Bribery in the Western Australian Transport Board	Alan G. Smith	1953
Royal Commission into Matters Relating to the Marketing and Distribution of Potatoes, Onions and Eggs	Alan G. Smith	1955
Royal Commission into Matters Relating to the Retailing of Motor Spirits and Accessories	Leslie C. Diver	1956
Royal Commission into the War Service Land Settlement Scheme in Western Australia	Leslie A. Logan	1956–1957
Royal Commission on Restrictive Trade Practices and Legislation	Arthur F. Watts	1957
Royal Commission appointed to inquire into administration of the Western Australian Government Railways	Alan G. Smith	1957
Royal Commission on Betting	George C. Ligertwood	1959
Royal Commission into Administration of the Western Australian Government Railways		1957–1959
Royal Commission into the Provisions of the Natural Therapists Bill	Hugh N. Guthrie	1960–1961
Royal Commission into Bribery or Inducements Offered to Members of Parliament Regarding the Totalisator Agency Board Betting Bill 1960	William J. Wallwork	1960
Royal Commission into the Bush Fires of December, 1960 and January, February and March, 1961 in Western Australia	Geoffrey J. Rodger	1961
Royal Commission on the Builders' Registration Act 1961	Norman E. Baxter	1961
Royal Commission on Procedures Affecting Financial Returns from Apple Growing	William C. Gillespie	1961–1962
Royal Commission into the Fisheries Act 1905–1962 and its Application to the Crayfishing Industry	Norman E. Baxter	1964
Royal Commission into the Safety of Ships	William J. Wallwork	1964
Royal Commission into Allegations Referring to the Operation of the Totalisator Agency Board	James H. Forrest	1967
Royal Commission into the Trading Activities of Wool Exporters Pty Ltd and Associated Companies	Francis Burt	1968
Royal Commission into Hire Purchase and Other Agreements	Walter R. McPharlin	1971–1972
Royal Commission into the Corridor Plan for Perth	Frederick R. White	1972
Royal Commission into Fremantle Prison	Robert E. Jones	1972–1973
Royal Commission into the Treatment of Alcohol and Drug Dependents in Western Australia	Richard J. Williams	1972–1973
Royal Commission upon all matters affecting the well being of persons of Aboriginal descent in Western Australia	Lyn C. Furnell	1973–1974
Royal Commission into Metropolitan Municipal District Boundaries	Laurence F. Johnson	1973–1974
Royal Commission on the State Government Insurance Office	Desmond C. Heenan	1973–1974
Royal Commission into Gambling	Phillip R. Adams	1973–1974
Royal Commission into Matters Relating to Homosexuality	Richard J. Williams	1974
Royal Commission on the Administration of the Stirling City Council Effluent Disposal Service	Lawrence F. Johnson	1974
Royal Commission upon Airline Services in the State and Related Matters	Reginald R. Sholl	1974–1975
Laverton Royal Commission	Gresley D. Clarkson	1975–1976
Royal Commission Concerning the Trial of Baymis Ugle	John E. Virtue	1975–1976
Royal Commission into Matters Surrounding the Administration of the Law Relating to Prostitution	John G. Norris	1975–1976
Royal Commission into the Marketing and Distribution of Beef and Sheep Meat Products	Albert V. Crane	1975–1976
Royal Commission into Dairy Products and Market Milk	Barry R. Blaikie	1982
Royal Commission into the Liquor Laws in Western Australia	John F. Syme	1984–1985
Royal Commission into Racing and Trotting in Western Australia	Norman E. Baxter	1983
Royal Commission into Parliamentary Deadlocks	Eric J. Edwards	1984–1985
Royal Commission into the Conservation and Land Management Act 1984	Alexander A. Lewis	1985
Royal Commission into Grain Storage, Handling and Transport (Note: Joint with Government of Australia, New South Wales, Queensland, South Australia and Victoria)	James M. McColl	1986–1988
Royal Commission into Aboriginal Deaths in Custody (Note: Joint with Government of Australia, New South Wales, Northern Territory, Queensland, South Australia, Tasmania and Victoria.)	James Henry Muirhead QC	1987–1991
Royal Commission into Commercial Activities of Government and Other Matters	Geoffrey Kennedy QC	1991–1992
Royal Commission into Use of Executive Power	Kenneth Marks AM QC	1995
Royal Commission into the City of Wanneroo	Roger Davis	1996–1997
Royal Commission into the Finance Broking Industry	Ian Temby QC	2001
Royal Commission Into Whether There Has Been Corrupt or Criminal Conduct By Any Western Australian Police Officer	Geoffrey Kennedy QC	2001–2004
Perth Casino Royal Commission	Hon Neville Owen, Hon Lindy Jenkins & Colin Murphy PSM	2021–2022
