= Royal Commission of Inquiry into Drug Trafficking =

Australian commission of inquiry

- Date: 1981–1983
- Duration: 2 years
- Location: Australia
- Also known as: Stewart Royal Commission
- Commissioner: Justice Donald Stewart

The Royal Commission of Inquiry into Drug Trafficking (1981–1983), also known as the Stewart Royal Commission, was a royal commission set up in 1981 by the Commonwealth, New South Wales, Queensland and Victorian governments to inquire into various drug trafficking and related criminal activities of Terry Clark and his associates. However, the commission would spend much of its time examining how criminals were using and abusing the passport system for criminal purposes including the fact that Clark had 5 passports under different names with him when he was arrested in 1978.

The commission was headed by New South Wales Supreme Court Judge Donald Stewart.

The Commission published its final report in 1983, making recommendations on how to prevent abuses in the issue of passports, most of which were acted upon by the government. The report made 40 recommendations, including that applicants for a passport attend a passport office and that mailed applications cease; that passports be issued only to citizens, so that British subjects cease to be entitled to a passport; that birth certificates not to be accepted as a sufficient proof of identity; that passports cease to be issued via travel or other agents; that all persons who change their names, whether by choice, marriage or adoption, be required to register the change with the state registrar of births, deaths and marriages and photocopied documents were not acceptable. Amongst the recommendations which were not accepted by the Fraser government was for a national fingerprint based identity system.

== See also ==
- Royal Commission into Drug Trafficking (Woodward Royal Commission), 1977-1979
