= John Beamont =

Colonial administrator and explorer in Van Diemen's Land

John Beamont (1789 – 19 December 1872) was an English-born colonial administrator and explorer in Van Diemen's Land. Associated with Lieutenant-Governor Thomas Davey, he later served as postmaster-general, naval officer, treasurer of the police fund, provost marshal, sheriff and registrar of deeds. He is chiefly remembered for his 1817 expedition into Tasmania's Central Highlands and his evidence to Commissioner John Thomas Bigge in 1820.

== Early life ==
Beamont was born in London in 1789. He reached Sydney aboard the Minstrel on 25 October 1812, apparently as Davey's secretary, and then proceeded to Van Diemen's Land. Governor Lachlan Macquarie ordered that he receive 300 acres (120 ha) and assigned convict servants. An expected appointment as crown agent did not eventuate, and Beamont instead accepted the office of postmaster-general.

== Personal life ==
Beamont married Maria Evans, daughter of explorer George William Evans.

== Service under Lieutenant-Governor Thomas Davey and bushranger affairs ==
Beamont's early colonial career was closely associated with Davey. An 1840 memorial to Lord John Russell, stated that Beamont had travelled with Davey as his secretary and expected appointment as Crown Agent for the disposal of Crown lands. During this period he also worked for John Ingle and later managed affairs for Edward Lord.

Records connect Beamont with the bushranger crisis of 1816. It notes that Michael Howe threatened Beamont and a newspaper report that Beamont's house at Tea Tree Brush was broken into and robbed. These references place him within the period of insecurity associated with Howe's gang.

Under Lieutenant-Governor William Sorell, Beamont entered more senior public offices. He became naval officer and treasurer of the police fund in 1818 and was appointed provost marshal in 1819.

== 1817 exploration of the Central Highlands ==
In December 1817 Beamont led an expedition westward from Edward Lord's hut at Cross Marsh. His journal records a route through Salisbury Plains, Bark Hut Plains and Shannon Plains to the "Large Lake", now known as Great Lake, before the party continued west through snow, marshes, rocky country and chains of smaller lakes.

Beamont estimated Great Lake at about 50 miles (80 km) in circumference and described a large island within it. On 10 December he traced a river that he believed to be the Gordon River, but the party turned back because provisions were running short. The journal is one of the earliest surviving European accounts of Tasmania's Central Highlands and western lake country.

== Evidence before Commissioner Bigge ==
Beamont gave evidence to Commissioner Bigge in 1820 about both colonial administration and the geography of the interior. He described travelling west from Cross Marsh to the Fat Doe and Shannon rivers, visiting Great Lake and continuing about 37 miles (60 km) farther west. He also described the lake's large island, the increasingly barren country beyond it and stands of Huon pine near the smaller western lakes.

His examination corroborates the principal details of the 1817 journal and shows that his knowledge of the interior formed part of the official evidence gathered by the Bigge inquiry.

== Later life and legacy ==
Following his retirement, Beamont remained a respected figure in the colony. He was an original subscriber to the Bank of Van Diemen's Land in 1823, chaired the public meeting protesting the recall of Lieutenant-Governor William Sorell later that year, and acted as Sorell's agent after his departure from the colony. Beamont was also among the signatories to the 1824 petition seeking the separation of Van Diemen's Land from New South Wales, a campaign that culminated in the establishment of the colony as a separate jurisdiction in 1825.

Beamont was repeatedly superseded in offices that he had filled in an acting or locally appointed capacity, but he remained in colonial service. He became acting sheriff in 1824, registrar of deeds in 1827 and sheriff again in 1836. He retired on a pension in 1841 and died in Hobart on 19 December 1872.
