= George Adams (businessman) =

Australian publican and lottery promoter

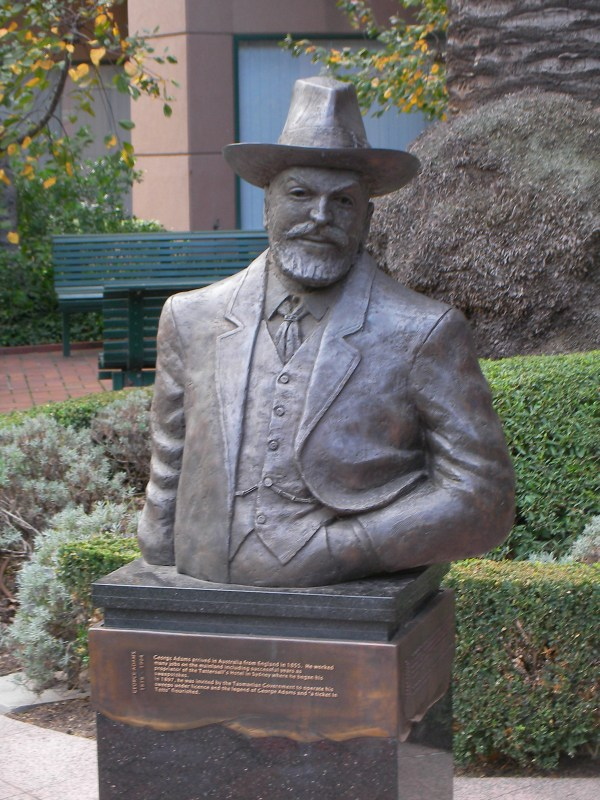
- Statue of Adams on St Kilda Road, Melbourne
- Born: 14 March 1839; Sandon, Hertfordshire, England
- Died: 23 September 1904 (aged 65); Hobart, Tasmania, Australia

George Adams (14 March 1839 – 23 September 1904) was an Australian publican and lottery promoter best known as the founder of Tattersall's.

== Biography ==
Adams was born in Redhill in the parish of Sandon, Hertfordshire, England. He was the fourth son of William Adams, a farm labourer, and his wife Martha (née Gilbey). The family emigrated to Australia and arrived on 28 May 1855.

Adams started as a gold miner in Kanoona, Queensland before working on sheep stations in New South Wales and setting up a stock dealer and butcher in Goulburn. In 1875, he swapped the trade of meat to the trade of liquor and purchased the licence to the Steam Packet Hotel in Kiama on the New South Wales south coast.

He frequented the Tattersall's Club in Sydney and was a good mixer and 'a man with friends'. Three of his friends, Bill Archer, George Hill and George Loseby, purchased the O'Brien Hotel, the home of the Tattersall's Club and told Adams to 'pay when you can'.

He later acquired the Bulli Coal Company, in 1894, and commenced reconstruction of its jetty to accommodate larger ships.

Within ten years, Adams was a wealthy man with the 'Tin Bar' replaced by the 'Marble Bar' at the O'Brien Hotel for £32,000. Tattersall's Club members subscribed to sweepstakes run on race meetings throughout Australia and eventually Adams began to include his hotel regulars and in 1881 he ran the first public Tattersall's sweep on the Sydney Cup.

During his time in Sydney he married Fanny Franklin in 1858; she died in 1883. In 1886, he married Norah Louie Jones. Norah died in Hobart in 1913. Adams had no children with either wife.

Religious groups opposed this form of gambling and in 1892 convinced the New South Wales state government to pass laws prohibiting the delivery of letters containing sweeps. He moved to Queensland, which soon introduced similar legislation, and so in 1895 he moved his business to Tasmania. Six months later the Tasmanian Government passed the Suppression of Public Betting and Gaming Act 1896 prohibiting betting shops but legalising certain lotteries. This allowed Adams to find a home for the Tattersall's lotteries for the next 58 years. Adams moved his home there and made Hobart home for the rest of his life.

When the Bank of Van Diemen's Land Ltd., Hobart, went into liquidation in 1893, the directors decided to raffle the bank's assets. George Adams conducted a lottery, the first in Tasmania, with 300,000 tickets at £1 each. The first prize was the bank building itself and the land on which it was built on Miller's Corner, Hobart. Second prize was Hadley's Orient Hotel, which was owned by the bank. All the other prizes consisted of a long list of bank properties in various places. Tickets were not fully taken up, though reported differently later on. "In spite of the interest shown, this first lottery had not been entirely successful. Only 50,000 tickets were sold and Hadley's had been withdrawn as the first prize". Hence, the initial drawing of the Grand Lottery had about 50,000 marbles placed in the drawing drum, equalling the number of tickets sold (about one-sixth of the tickets offered).

A flyer, dated December 1895, announces the "Grand Lottery. Second Distribution of Prizes" with 200,000 tickets at 5/- each. Hadley's Orient Hotel is again set out as First Prize, with 223 more prizes formed by bank premises, hotels, cottages, building lots, etc. This second lottery was also not fully taken up, and the prizes allocated "pro rata" as laid out in the terms and conditions. Hadley's Hotel was again withdrawn from the prizes to be handed over, and remained in Hadley's hands.

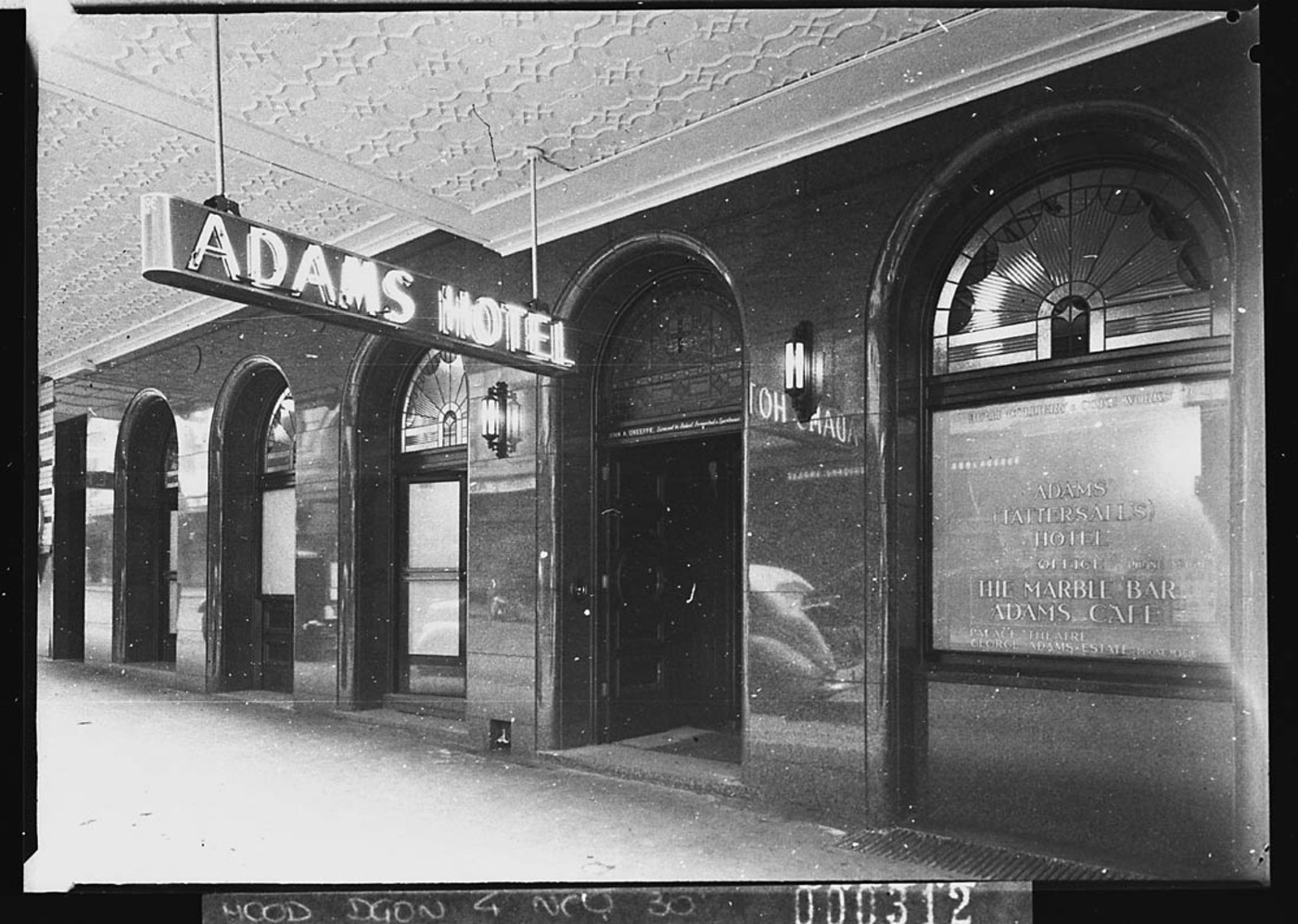
The Adams Hotel, Pitt Street, around 1939

George Adams had started running public "sweeps" from his property, Tattersall's Hotel, Pitt Street, Sydney (home of the Sydney Tattersall Club), in 1881. He moved to Hobart in 1896, after "Tattersall's Consultations" had been forced out of NSW in 1893, and facing a similar fate in QLD (Telegraph Chambers, Queen St., Brisbane) during 1895. He was desperately looking for a new home for his enterprise, however facing low prospect throughout Australia. He even contemplated moving his business to New Caledonia. It came very handy to him when was invited by the Government of Tasmania to evaluate a plan on how to reconcile the 1891 failure of the VDL Bank, especially with focus on how to generate cash for the Tasmanian government. He drew up the finally adopted plan of selling lottery tickets to imburse cash, while handing out real estate items owned by the VDL bank, or serving as security for credits handed out by the VDL Bank.

Adams denied being paid for his efforts regarding the Grand Lottery. Instead, he asked premier Braddon to support his plea for his Tattersall's Consultations being licensed. Despite his dream not yet being accomplished, he relocated to Tasmania at the end of 1895. The first home to his enterprise became Fysh's Building, Elizabeth St., Hobart, where a first sweep was conducted on the Anniversary Handicap, run at Randwick, 26 Jan 1896.

On 1 June 1897, the Tasmanian Government granted Tattersall's Consultations an exclusive license to conduct lotteries under the Suppression of Public Betting and Gaming Act 1896. The license cost the proprietor George Adams £10,000, and permanently wedded the fortunes of the government with the financial success of Tattersall's Consultations. This first year in Hobart 1897 gave work to 50 employees, who received a total of £4,400 wages. 1899 he relocated within Hobart to newly constructed offices at 77 Collins Street, Hobart.

He used the economic depression to erect numerous buildings. "He built the Tasmanian Brewery at the corner of Warwick and Elizabeth Streets, Tattersall's Offices, Fitzgerald's Warehouse at Collins Street, Wellington Chambers, Beattie's Property, a terrace in Melville Street and three hotels, Highfield Hall, the Theatre Royal, and the Old Commodore. He also partly rebuilt or put into repair a large number of properties which he bought". This building boom helped Tasmania to recover from former troubles.

George Adams died in Hobart and was buried in Cornelian Bay Cemetery under a headstone engraved 'George Adams (Tattersall)'. At the time of his death, Adams was contracted to buy more real estate in Tasmania and had intended to start business as a maltster and brewer.

== Legacy ==
The beneficiaries of his estate were the "Trustees of the Estate of the late George Adams", made up by his nephew William James Adams, Solicitor W. A. Finlay, Manager D. H. Harvey, and Solicitor G. J. Barry. The will set of the benefits to be inherited by all descendants of the initial trustees. The updated list kept to be a well protected secrecy and was only published at the verge of floating share of the Tatts Group.

There is a statue of Adams on St Kilda Road at the former (1954–2012) Tatts Group Limited head office near St Kilda Junction in Melbourne.

His famous 'Marble Bar', in Sydney, was demolished in 1969 but then reinstated in the then new Hilton Hotel in 1973.

Following a grant of a new license by the Government of Queensland Tatts relocated to Brisbane in 2013.
