= Bulli Jetty =

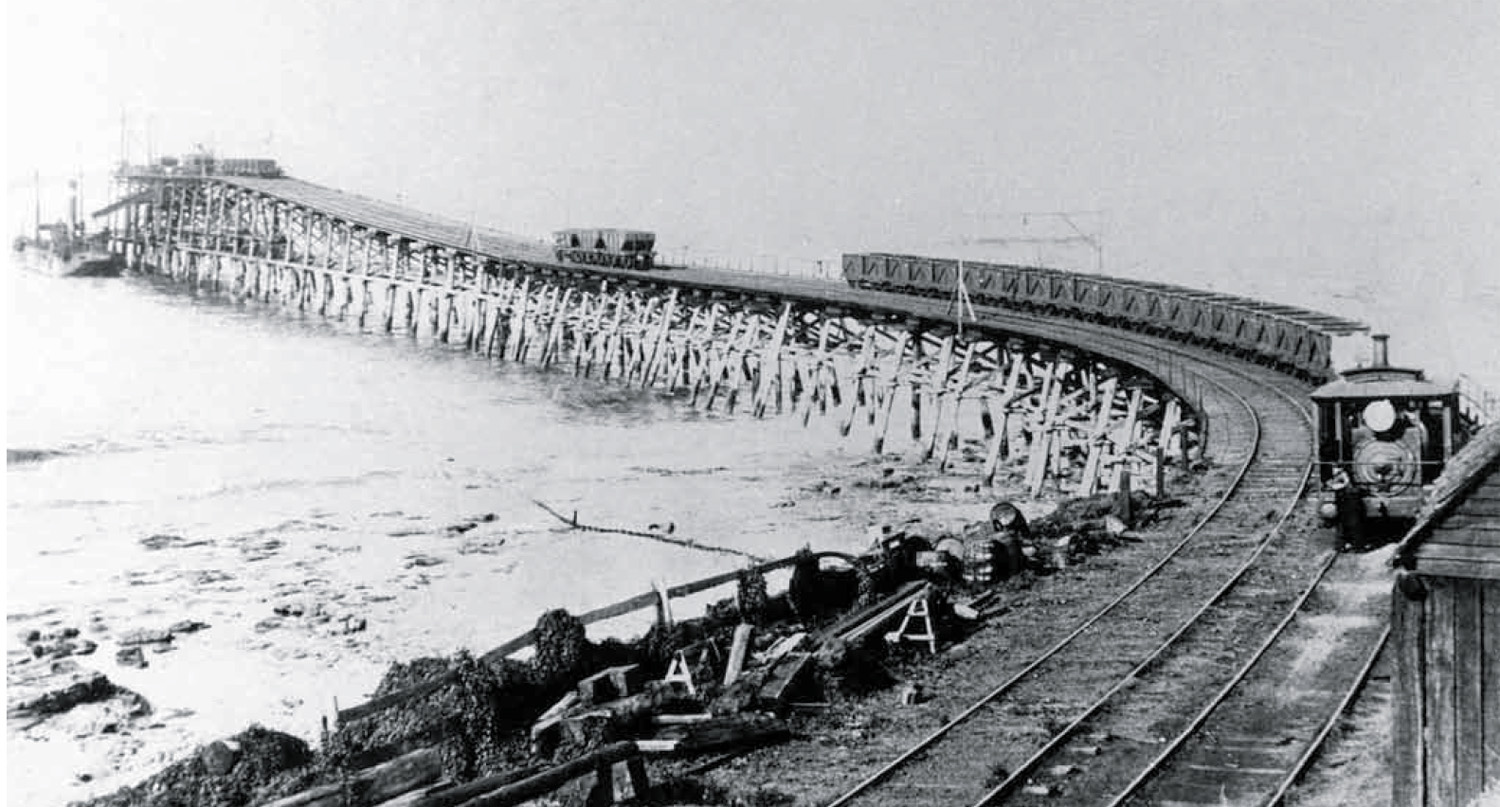
- Bulli Jetty circa 1900 showing the coal trucks and steam train
- Coordinates: 34°19′46.740″S 150°55′38.377″E

Characteristics
- Total length: over 800 feet (240 m)

Location
- Interactive map of Bulli Jetty

Bulli Jetty at Sandon Point, was first built in 1863 and was abandoned in 1943. During that time it was used by the Bulli Coal Company in the transportation of coal from the Bulli mine to the ships for export to other destinations.

D. H. Lawrence who visited Thirroul in 1922 and lived only about .9 km (0.56 mi) from the jetty described it as,

a long, high jetty straddling on great tree-trunk poles out on to the sea, and carrying a long line of little red-coal trucks, the sort that can be tipped up…As a rule the jetty was as deserted as if it were some relic left by an old invader. Then it had spurts of activity, when steamer after steamer came blorting and hanging miserably round, like cows to the cowshed on a winter afternoon. Then a little engine would chuff along the pier, shoving a string of tip-up trucks, and little men would saunter across the sky-line, and there would be a fine dimness of black dust round the low, red ship at the end of the jetty.

== History ==
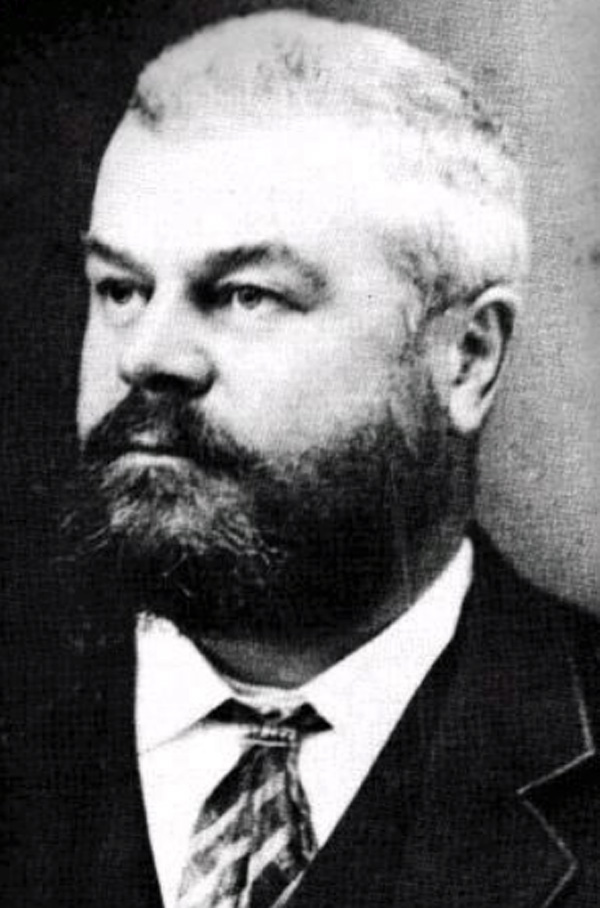
George Adams, owner of the Jetty and Bulli Mine circa 1890.

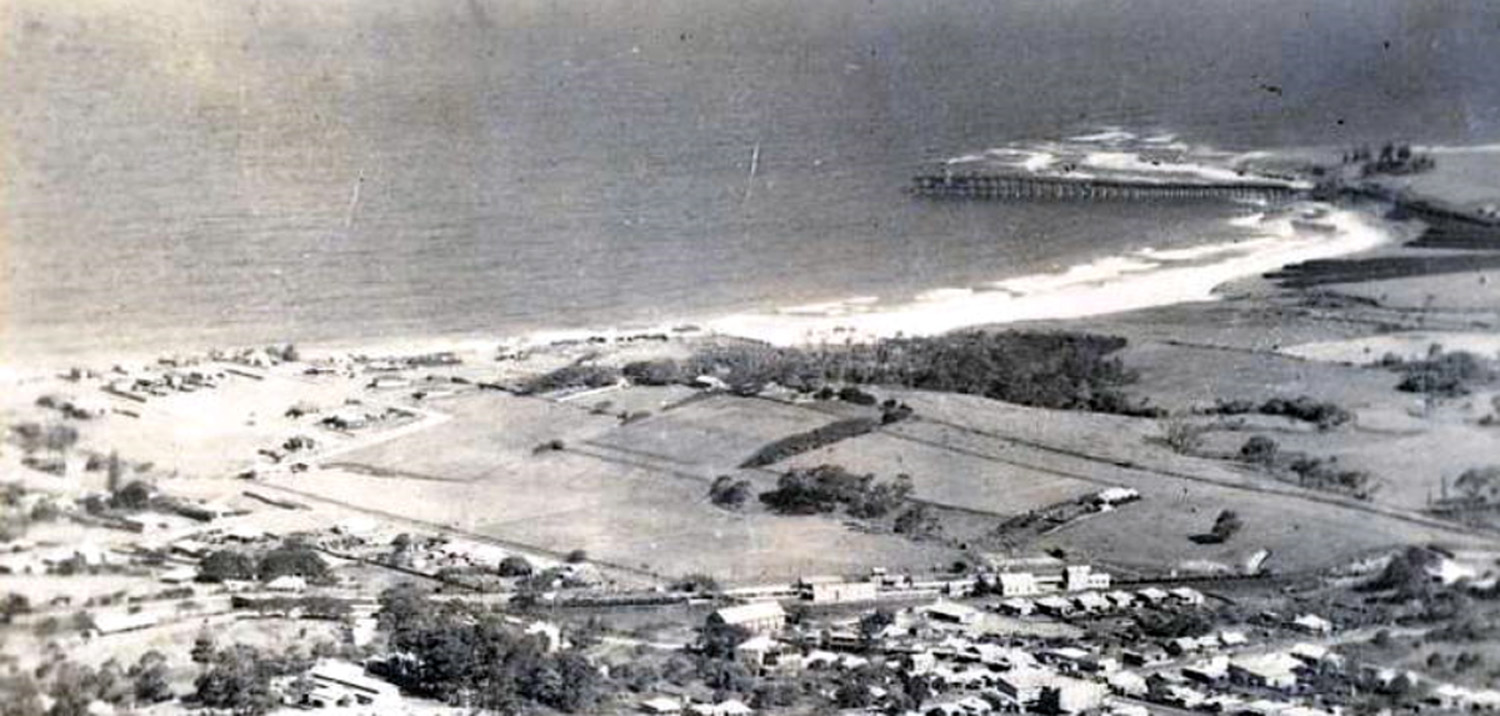
Bulli Jetty as seen from Sublime Point circa 1900.

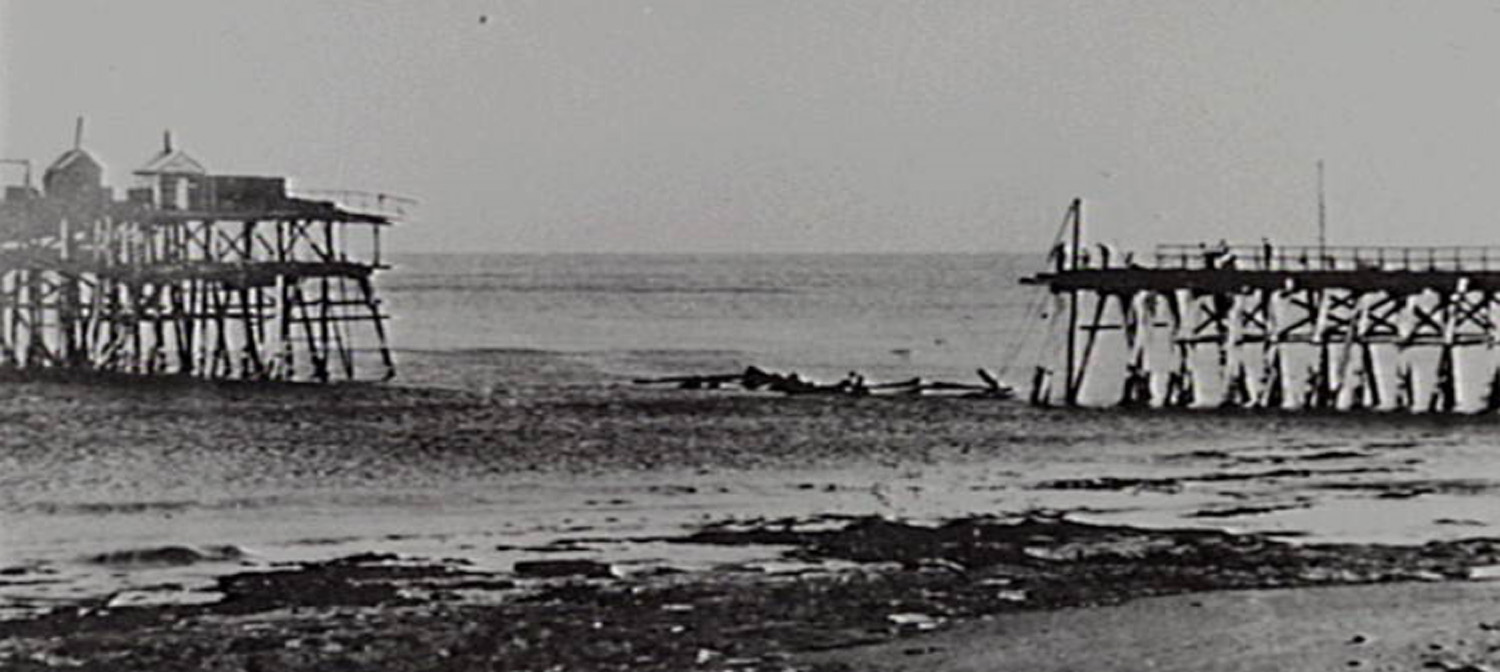
Collapsed portion of Bulli Jetty in 1907.

The line was originally proposed to be built to Bellambi but was revised. The jetty was constructed at Sandon Point in 1863. It was over 200 m (660 ft) long and was built by William Weaver, an engineer who worked for the Bulli Coal Company. In 1867 much of it was swept away in a storm taking with it the lives of the four men who were working on it at the time.

Over the next two decades numerous repairs were made to the jetty after storm damage. In about 1890 it closed for several years.

George Adams acquired the Bulli Coal Company in 1894 and commenced reconstruction of the jetty. He lengthened it by about 30 m (98 ft) and raised it to allow the safe loading of much larger coal ships. He also installed electric lights on the jetty which was a major advance at that time.

Soon after George Adams became the owner of the Bulli mine he built a large house at Sandon Point not far from the jetty which he called “Sandon Cottage”. A photo of the house and jetty are shown below. He lived at the house periodically and occasionally entertained visitors such as parliamentarians there.

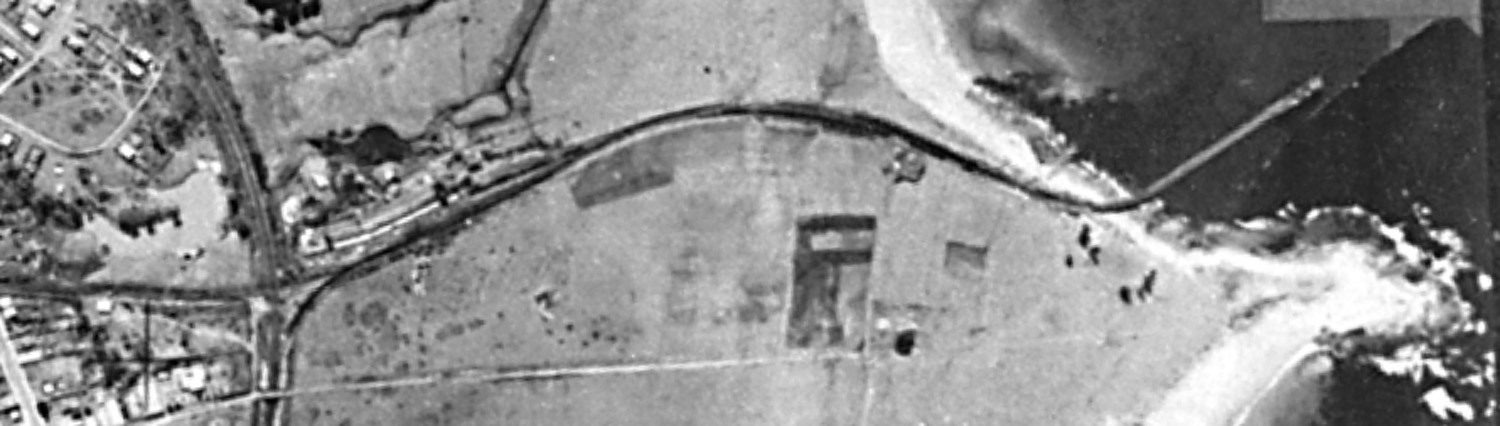
Aerial view of Bulli Jetty in 1938.

On 30 April 1907, after the new jetty had been in operation for over a decade, a large length of the jetty collapsed in perfectly calm weather. The newspaper reported that “without the slightest warning the centre portion of the jetty suddenly subsided and disappeared into the sea. One of the employees had only half a minute previously stepped onto the higher portion at the sea end of the jetty which was left standing." Two months later the remaining part at the sea end was also destroyed but this time the destruction was caused by a fierce storm. The repairs to the jetty took almost two years to complete. In 1912 more major storm damage occurred to the structure which took some considerable time to repair.

In 1943 the jetty was damaged and abandoned with successive storms caused further damage to the pylons. It was used by fishermen but no more mining operations occurred at the site.

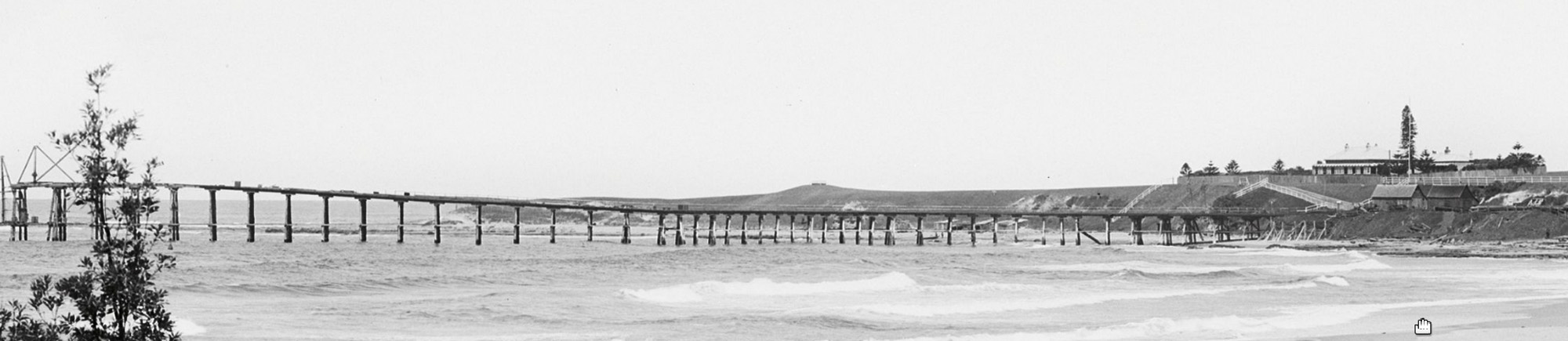
Bulli Jetty and Sandon Point showing George Adam's house called "Sandon Cottage" (now demolished) circa 1900.

== Jetty employees ==
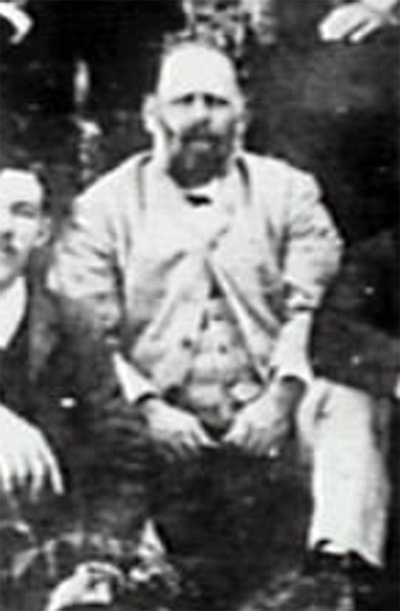
Alexander Spence Artis.

One of the first managers of the jetty was Alexander Spence Artis. At the age of 27 he commenced work at the jetty soon after it was opened and remained there until his retirement twenty-four years later. Artis was born in England and became an able seaman and later qualified as a second mate. In 1863 after he arrived in Sydney on the ship Canada West he deserted. He married Eliza Lang in Glebe a few months later and they came to Bulli to live. He sought employment on the jetty and eventually he rose to the position of manager.

Another notable manager of the Bulli Jetty was James Owers (1862-1939) who came to work here in about 1890. He married Emily Waskett in 1887 and the couple came to Australia. He was employed as an able seaman on the coal ship Woonona. The Woonona included Bulli as one of its routine ports of call. Owers worked on the jetty for over forty years eventually becoming the manager.

== See also ==
- Coastal coal-carrying trade of New South Wales
