= Kenneth Marks (jurist) =

Australian judge (1924–2005)

Kenneth Henry Marks, AM, QC (10 September 1924 – 4 December 2005) was a judge of the Supreme Court of Victoria, royal commissioner and chairman of the Victorian Bar council. Marks led the Easton Royal Commission, leading up to the Easton Affair. Marks was appointed Member of the Order of Australia (AM) in the 2005 Australia Day Honours for "service to the judiciary and to the law, particularly in the area of law reform and through the implementation of innovative changes to court administration".

== Early life and education ==
Marks was born in Melbourne, Australia and attended Melbourne Grammar School and the University of Melbourne.
