= List of New South Wales royal commissions =

This is a list of royal commissions in New South Wales, Australia.

== Nineteenth century ==
=== 1860s ===
- Royal Commission of Inquiry into the Condition of the Harbour of Port Jackson (1865–1866)
- Royal Commission to enquire into crime in the Braidwood District (1867) (Clarke brothers, bushrangers)
- Royal Commission of Enquiry into certain charges referred against and by Mr Farrand, Police Magistrate and Mr Parker, Clerk of Petty Sessions, at Forbes (c. 1868–c. 1869)
- Royal Commission of Enquiry into certain cases of Alleged Kidnapping of Natives of the Loyalty Islands, in the years 1865–1868; and the state and probable results of Polynesian Immigration (1869)

=== 1870s ===
- Royal Commission of Inquiry into the Working of the present Gold Fields Act and Regulations of New South Wales and into the best means of securing a permanent water supply for the Gold Fields of the Colony (1870–1871)
- Royal Commission appointed to inquire into and report upon the working and management of the public charities of the Colony ("Royal Commission into Public Charities"), (1873)
- Royal Commission on Oyster Culture ("Oyster Culture Commission"), (1876–1877)
- Royal Commission to inquire into and report upon the general management and discipline of the gaol at Berrima ("Berrima Gaol Inquiry Commission"), (1878)
- Royal Commission to inquire into and report upon the working of the Real Property Acts (1879)

=== 1880s ===
- Royal Commission of Inquiry into the conduct of Frederick William Meymott (1880)
- Royal Commission of Inquiry into the Management of the Quarantine Station North Head and the hulk Faraway ("Rendell Royal Commission"), (1881)
- Royal Commission to inquire into the working of the laws and regulations, and to the arrangement made from time to time for the establishment and maintenance of the military forces of New South Wales ("Military Defences Inquiry Commission"), (1881)
- Royal Commission to inquire into the expenditure and distribution of £17,100 to the Milburn Creek Copper-mining Company limited.
- Royal Commission into the working of the Friendly Societies Act, 37 Vic. No.4 (1881–1882)
- Royal Commission on Noxious and Offensive Trades (1882)
- Royal Commission on the Conservation of Water (1884–1887)
- Royal Commission on Collieries (1886)
- Royal Commission into the Bulli Colliery Explosion (1887)
- Theatres Royal Commission (1887)
- Cox Royal Commission (1888)
- Royal Intercolonial Rabbit Commission (Note: Royal Commission commissioned jointly with the Commonwealth Government.) (1888)
- Royal Commission into the alleged tampering with letters of John Deasy (1889)
- Royal Commission into alleged unfitness of William Meeke Fehon for appointment as one of the Commissioners for Railways ("Fehon Inquiry Commission"), (1889)

=== 1890s ===
- Royal Commission on Strikes (1890–1891)
- Darley Royal Commission (1891)
- Royal Commission on Alleged Chinese Gambling and Immorality ("Manning Royal Commission"), (1891)
- Royal Commission on City and Suburban Railways (1890–1891)
- Royal Commission appointed to inquire into the charges against Mr. E.M.G. Eddy, the Chief Commissioner of Railways (1892)
- Royal Commission of inquiry into the alleged defectiveness and unsuitability of the Baldwin Locomotives (1892)
- Royal Commission of Inquiry into the Civil Service ("Littlejohn Royal Commission"), (1894–1895)
- Royal Commission into the Working of the Deeds and Search Branch of the Registrar-General's Department (1893)
- Royal Commission of Inquiry into the Coal Mining Regulation Bill (1895)
- Royal Commission of Inquiry into the case of George Dean ("George Dean Royal Commission"), (1895)
- Royal Commission of Inquiry into the case of Mr Charles Herbert Battye, Inspector of Conditional Purchases, charged with having accepted a bribe (1896)
- Royal Commission on City Railway Extension (1896–1897)
- Royal Commission into the Albert mining district (1897)
- Royal Commission of Inquiry into the cause of the dangers to which vessels carrying coal are said to be peculiarly liable (1896–1897)
- Coal Cargoes Further Inquiry Commission (1897–1900)
- Royal Commission of Inquiry into the Management of the Metropolitan Water and Sewerage Board (1897)
- Royal Commission of Inquiry into the Institution for the Blind, Strathfield (1897–1898)
- Royal Commission of Inquiry into the Management of the Marine Board (1897)
- Royal Commission of Inquiry into charges by Robert Henry Levien, Esquire, M.P., against certain members of the Legislative Assembly (1898)
- Royal Commission of Inquiry into certain allegations concerning the conduct of the Honourable James Henry Young, Secretary for Public Works, during the recent Election for the Hastings and the Macleay Electorate, and into the circumstances and proceedings (1898)
- Royal Commission on Sites for the Seat of Government of the Commonwealth (1899–1900)

== Twentieth century ==
=== 1900s ===
- Royal Commission of Inquiry into certain questions relating to the conduct of Mr James Roberts as Tramway Manager (1900)
- Royal Commission of Inquiry into the case of William Creswell (1900)
- Royal Commission of Inquiry into certain charges preferred against Sub-Treasurer Fowler, West Maitland (1900)
- Royal Commission on Primary, Secondary, Technical and other Branches of Education ("Knibbs-Turner Royal Commission"), (1902)
- Royal Commission on a Charge against Sergeant James Hogg (1902)
- Royal Commission of Inquiry respecting the Mount Kembla Colliery Disaster (1902–1903)
- Royal Commission of Inquiry into the Working and Administration of the Government Docks and Workshops at Cockatoo Island (1903)
- Royal Commission into Norfolk Island Affairs (1903)
- Royal Commission on the Decline of the Birth-Rate and on the Mortality of Infants in New South Wales (1904)
- Railway Locomotives Royal Commission (1904)
- Royal Commission of Inquiry into the cost of the Cataract Dam (1905)
- Royal Commission of Inquiry into the Railway Administration (1905–1906)
- Royal Commission of Inquiry into the administration of the Lands Department (1905–1907) (which found Paddy Crick, the former Secretary for Lands, corruptly received payments from a land agent).
- Royal Commission on the Federal Navigation Bill (1906)
- Royal Commission (No 2) of Inquiry into Claims of Members of New South Wales Contingents in South Africa ("Royal Commission into Boer War veterans") (1907)
- Royal Commission on Coal Mining Disputes, Newcastle and Gunnedah Districts (1907–1909)
- Royal Commission for the Improvement of the City of Sydney and Its Suburbs (1908)
- Forestry Royal Commission (1908)
- Royal Commission on Communication between Sydney and North Sydney ("Royal Commission into Sydney Harbour crossing") (1908–1909)
- Royal Commission for the Improvement of the City of Sydney and its Suburbs (1908–1909)
- Royal Commission into Saturday Half Holiday (1909)
- Royal Commission into Coal loader (1909)

=== 1910s ===
- Royal Commission of Inquiry into certain allegations made by Police Constables Mitchell and Styles, against Sergeant Sheehy, and 1st class Constable Boon, in connection with the death of Walter Bosworth in a police cell, at Bathurst on 28 January 1911 (c. 1911)
- Royal Commission of Inquiry into the alleged treatment of Prisoner Joseph Henry Denmead and certain representations made by Thomas Love (1911)
- Royal Commission of Inquiry into the Administration of the Fire Brigades Act (1911)
- Royal Commission of Inquiry into certain allegations made by Police Constable Fortescue Mitchell and Police Constable Sidney Thomas Styles (1911)
- Royal Commission of Inquiry into the best methods of working the thick coal seams in the Maitland-Cessnock District (1911)
- Piddington Royal Commission (1911)
- Langwell Royal Commission (1911)
- Blacket Royal Commission (1912)
- Bavin Royal Commission (1912)
- Royal Commission of Inquiry into charges preferred against the Minister for Public Works (1912)
- Railway locomotives Royal Commission (1912)
- Royal Commission into South Maitland coalfields (1912)
- Royal Commission into the Administration of the Mental Hospital and the Reception House for the Insane, Darlinghurst (1913)
- Piddington Royal Commission (1913)
- Thompson Royal Commission (1913)
- Royal Commission on the purchase by the Government of the Boorabil Estate and adjoining improvement leases (1914)
- Cocks Royal Commission (1914)
- Royal Commission of inquiry respecting the Wheat Acquisition Act ("Ferguson Royal Commission"), (1915)
- Royal Commission of Inquiry into the Administration of the Dental Board and the Conduct of its Registrar (1915)
- Carmichael Royal Commission (1915)
- Royal Commission of Inquiry into allegations of corruption in connection with proposed State monopoly of petrol industry (1916)
- Royal Commission on the charges made by Richard Price against the Minister for Lands, William Ashford (1917)
- Royal Commission of Inquiry into Allegations as to bribery of Mr P.Lamph, a member of the Licensing Court at Bowraville, by Mr G.B. Kritsch, in connection with an application by Mr M. Wallace for a publican's licence at Macksville (1917)
- Royal Commission to Enquire into the Public Service of New South Wales (1917–18)
- Royal Commission Respecting the Inquiry on the Homebush Abattoirs and the Meat Industry Act, 1915 (1918)
- Harvey Royal Commission (1918)
- Allard Royal Commission (1918)
- Railway time cards Royal Commission (1918)
- Allard Royal Commission II (1919)
- Campbell Royal Commission (1919)
- Greater Newcastle Royal Commission (1919)
- Royal Commission respecting the inquiry into the George Georgeson wheat contract (1919)

=== 1920s ===
- Royal Commission of Inquiry into the State Wheat Pool ("Pring Royal Commission"), (1919–1921)
- Royal Commission of Inquiry into the Matter of the Trial and Conviction and Sentences Imposed on Charles Reeve and Others (1920)
- Royal Commission of Inquiry into certain charges against Messrs. Dooley, Mutch, and Johnston, members of the Legislative Assembly of New South Wales (1920)
- Royal Commission of Inquiry into the Coal Mining Industry and the Coal Trade in the State of New South Wales (1919–c. 1921)
- Allard Royal Commission (1920)
- Beeby Royal Commission (1920)
- Edmunds Royal Commission (1920)
- Royal Commission of Inquiry into the Administration of the Returned Soldiers' Settlement Branch, Department of Lands (1920–1921)
- Wade Royal Commission (1921)
- Royal Commission into Rail gauge in Australia (1921)
- Royal Commission on Lunacy Law and Administration (1922–1923)
- Royal Commission of Enquiry into the Question of the Constitution of a Harbour Trust to control the administration of the Port of Newcastle (1922–1923)
- Royal Commission into Closer Settlement (1924)
- Royal Commission of Inquiry into Redistribution of Wards (1924)
- Royal Commission of Inquiry into the Railway and Tramway Services (1924)
- Campbell Royal Commission (1924)
- Royal Commission of Inquiry respecting the conduct of Aldermen of the Municipal Council of Sydney in connection with certain matters ("Lamb Royal Commission"), (1924–1925)
- Royal Commission of Inquiry into Certain Allegations regarding the purchase and re-sale of cornsacks by the Minister for Agriculture (1925)
- New States Royal Commission of Inquiry ("Cohen Royal Commission") (1924-5)
- Allegations concerning the Industrial Commissioner, Mr A B Piddington KC (1927)
- Harvey Royal Commission (1927)
- Royal Commission into Bunnerong Powerhouse (1928)
- Davidson Royal Commission (Campsie busses) (1929)
- Royal Commission of Inquiry into the Coal Industry ("Davidson Royal Commission – Coal"), (1929–1930)
- Royal Commission into the Parramatta by-election (1929)

=== 1930s ===
- Royal Commission of Inquiry into the Administration of the Newcastle District Abattoir Board (1930)
- Shand Royal Commission (1931)
- Prior Royal Commission (1931)
- Royal Commission of Inquiry into the Administration of the Western Division of New South Wales (1931)
- Royal Commission into the Administration of the Milk Act (1931)
- Charles Goode (1932)
- Royal Commission on Greyhound Racing and Fruit Machines ("Rogers Royal Commission"), (1932)
- Royal Commission on matters concerning the promotion and operations of certain companies in New South Wales (1934–1935)
- Gepp Royal Commission (1935)
- Royal Commission of Inquiry Respecting Areas in the State of New South Wales Suitable for Self-Government as States in the Commonwealth of Australia ("Nicholas Royal Commission"), (1933–1935)
- Royal Commission on matters concerning the promotion and operations of certain companies in New South Wales (1935)
- Royal Commission into the Price of Bread (1935-6)
- Royal Commission into Matters Affecting the Lands Department and Western Lands Commission ("White Royal Commission"), (1935–1936)
- Markell Royal Commission (1937)
- Royal Commission of Inquiry into Charges of Fraud and Corruption in connection with the Sale of State Industrial Undertakings ("Rogers Royal Commission"), (1937–1938)
- Royal Commission of Inquiry into the Fruit Industry of New South Wales (1937–1939)
- Royal Commission on Safety and Health of Workers in Coal Mines (1938–1939)

=== 1940s ===
- Royal Commission into the Compulsory Retirement of Employees in Coal and Oil Shale Mines in New South Wales at the age of 60 years (1940–1941)
- Royal Commission into whether The Honourable Vernon Haddon Treatt, Minister of Justice for the state of New South Wales, was guilty of any improper conduct in recommending the reduction of a fine imposed upon the Abbco Bread Company Proprietary Limited (1941)
- Royal Commission on Local Government Boundaries ("Clancy Royal Commission"), (1945–1946)
- Royal Commission of Inquiry into the Gas Industry (1948–1949)

=== 1950s ===
- Royal Commission of Inquiry into the conduct of Mr Frederick Joseph Cahill, MLA, concerning matters relating to the provision of transport facilities by the Department of Railways for the conveyance of magnesite for Non – Metallic Ltd. (1950)
- Royal Commission of Inquiry as to the conviction of Frederick Lincoln McDermott for the Murder of William Henry Lavers (1951–1952)
- Royal Commission of Inquiry into matters relating to Joshua George Arthur and Reginald Aubrey Doyle (1953)
- Royal Commission on Liquor Laws in New South Wales (1951–1954)
- Royal Commission of Inquiry into certain matters relating to David Edward Studley-Ruxton (1954)
- Royal Commission of Inquiry into statements made by the Auditor-General in his Annual Report for the Year Ended 30 June 1958, concerning the Minister for Housing, the Honourable Abram Landa ("Royal Commission into Abe Landa") (1958)

=== 1960s ===
- Royal Commission of Inquiry in respect of certain matters relating to Callan Park Mental Hospital (1960–1961)
- Royal Commission of Inquiry on the Landlord and Tenant (Amendment) Act, 1948, as amended (1960–1961)
- Royal Commission into Off-the-Course Betting in New South Wales (1962–1963)
- Royal Commission of Inquiry into Rating, Valuation and Local Government Finance (1965–1967)

=== 1970s ===
- Royal Commission on Petroleum (Commonwealth) (1973–1976)
- Royal Commission of Inquiry In Respect Of Certain Matters Relating to Allegations of Organised Crime in Clubs ("Moffitt Royal Commission"), (1973–1974)
- Royal Commission into New South Wales Prisons ("Nagle Royal Commission"), (1976–1978)
- Royal Commission into Drug Trafficking ("Woodward Royal Commission"), (1977–1979)

=== 1980s ===
- Royal Commission of Inquiry into Drug Trafficking ("Stewart Royal Commission"), (1981–1983)
- Royal Commission of Inquiry into Certain Committal Proceedings against K.E. Humphreys (1983) ("Street Royal Commission"), informally known as the "Wran Royal Commission".
- Royal Commission of Inquiry into the activities of the Nugan Hand Group (1985)
- Royal Commission into the former Chelmsford Private Hospital and Mental Health Services in New South Wales ("Chelmsford Royal Commission"), (1989–1990)
- Royal Commission into the Arrest, Charging and Withdrawal of Charges against Harold James Blackburn and Matters Associated Therewith ("Blackburn Royal Commission"), (1989–1990)

=== 1990s ===
- Royal Commission into Productivity in the Building Industry in New South Wales ("Gyles Royal Commission"), (1992)
- Royal Commission into the New South Wales Police Service ("Wood Royal Commission"), (1994–1997)

== Twenty-first century ==
=== 2010s ===
- Royal Commission into Institutional Responses to Child Sexual Abuse (2013–2017)

== See also ==
- Independent Commission Against Corruption (ICAC)
- Royal commissions in Australia
- List of Australian royal commissions
