= Easton affair =

Western Australian political scandal

The Easton affair was the name which came to be used to describe a Western Australian political scandal. A member of the Labor Party, then in government, tabled a document on 5 November 1992 in the Western Australian Legislative Council claiming that confidential information was improperly released by the Liberal Opposition Leader, Richard Court, to one side of a divorce case before the Family Court of Western Australia. The information was released to a woman named Penny Easton and related to the financial arrangements of her former husband. The claim, which attracted significant public interest, was followed four days later by Ms Easton's suicide. The government, and in particular the Premier, Carmen Lawrence, denied any prior knowledge of the petition. Following the defeat of Labor at the 1993 election, Court, who had succeeded Lawrence as Premier, requested a Royal Commission to be held. In November 1995, the Commission found that Lawrence had misled the Western Australian parliament. She was charged with three counts of perjury but acquitted on 23 May 1999 following a trial by a jury.

== Overview ==
On 5 November 1992, a petition was tabled in the Western Australian Legislative Council by John Halden MLC containing an allegation that the state Opposition Leader, Richard Court, had improperly provided confidential information to a party in a divorce case. The petitioner was Brian Mahon Easton, a former Western Australian public servant. The alleged recipient of the information was his former wife, Penny Easton.

Ms Easton had been corresponding with Liberal Members of Parliament in an attempt to obtain assistance in proving that her husband had concealed from the Family Court some of his earnings as a public servant. The amount in question was A$200,000 which he was alleged to have received as a retirement benefit from Exim Corporation, a body created by the State Government during the WA Inc era and of which Easton had been General Manager. The petition alleged that details of Easton's severance arrangements had been unlawfully disclosed. Significant parts of the petition were subsequently discovered to be false, particularly concerning the role of Richard Court in the matter.

The tabling of the petition attracted intense media interest. Penny Easton, who had refused to respond to enquiries by journalists, committed suicide on 9 November 1992. Her vehicle was discovered in bushland with her body inside; she had died by deliberate inhalation of exhaust fumes. In Parliament on the following day, in response to an Opposition question, Premier Carmen Lawrence denied prior knowledge of the petition.

== The Easton Royal Commission ==
In April 1995, Keith Wilson, a Minister and Cabinet member in November 1992, told Paul McGeough, a journalist then employed by the Sydney Morning Herald, that the Easton matter was raised at a Cabinet meeting prior to the tabling of the petition. Wilson had lost his seat at the 1993 state election which swept away the Lawrence Government and shortly afterwards had resigned from the ALP. This meant that Wilson had no loyalties to the ALP, let alone to Lawrence, when he made the revelation of the Easton matter.

On 19 April 1995, another former Minister in the Cabinet, Pam Beggs, made a statement supportive of Wilson. In May 1995, Richard Court, who had succeeded Lawrence as Premier following the election of 1993, requested the creation of a Royal Commission to determine the circumstances of the tabling of the Easton petition. The Commissioner was Kenneth Marks QC. The establishment of the Commission attracted severe attacks from Lawrence's colleagues in the federal parliamentary Labor party. The federal Member for Perth, Stephen Smith, was particularly hostile and made public comments, before the identity of the commissioner was announced, warning that any judge who agreed to head the inquiry should be prepared for political attack.

On 14 November 1995, the Marks Royal Commission released a report which found that Lawrence had misled the Western Australian Parliament concerning her knowledge of and role in the tabling of the petition. Prime Minister Paul Keating denounced the commission as a political stunt and accused the Commissioner of bias.

== The trials ==
Brian Easton was charged with contempt of the Parliament by motion of the Legislative Council in 1995 and, upon conviction, was ordered to present himself in the chamber to apologise. He refused and was sentenced by the council to 7 days imprisonment.

John Halden was charged with perjury before the Royal Commission and acquitted after a trial in December 1998.

Following the defeat of the Keating government in the election held on 2 March 1996, Carmen Lawrence had been appointed to the Opposition frontbench as Shadow Environment Minister. On 21 February 1997, she was charged with three counts of perjury resulting from the findings of the Marks Royal Commission. A trial by jury followed during which she stood down from the shadow ministry. She was acquitted of the charges on 23 July 1999. When Lawrence announced her retirement from politics in March 2007, she described the affair as the lowest point in her political career.
