= Donald Stewart (judge) =

Australian judge

- Born: 25 November 1928; Australia
- Died: 14 July 2016 (aged 87)
- Occupations: Judge, Royal Commissioner, Police Officer, Writer
- Known for: Fighting police corruption, Combatting drug trafficking.

Donald Gerard Stewart (25 November 1928 – 14 July 2016) was an Australian judge, barrister, police officer, Royal Commissioner, and founding chairman of the National Crime Authority of Australia. He spent a lifetime fighting police corruption and drug trafficking and detailed many of his experiences in his memoirs Recollections of an Unreasonable Man. He attended Sydney Boys High School from 1941 to 1946. He died in 2016 at the age of 87.

== See also ==
- Royal Commission of Inquiry into Drug Trafficking ("Stewart Royal Commission") (1980–1983)
