= Bank of Van Diemen's Land =

Former commercial bank in the Colony of Tasmania

Coordinates: 42°52′55.58″S 147°19′43.04″E

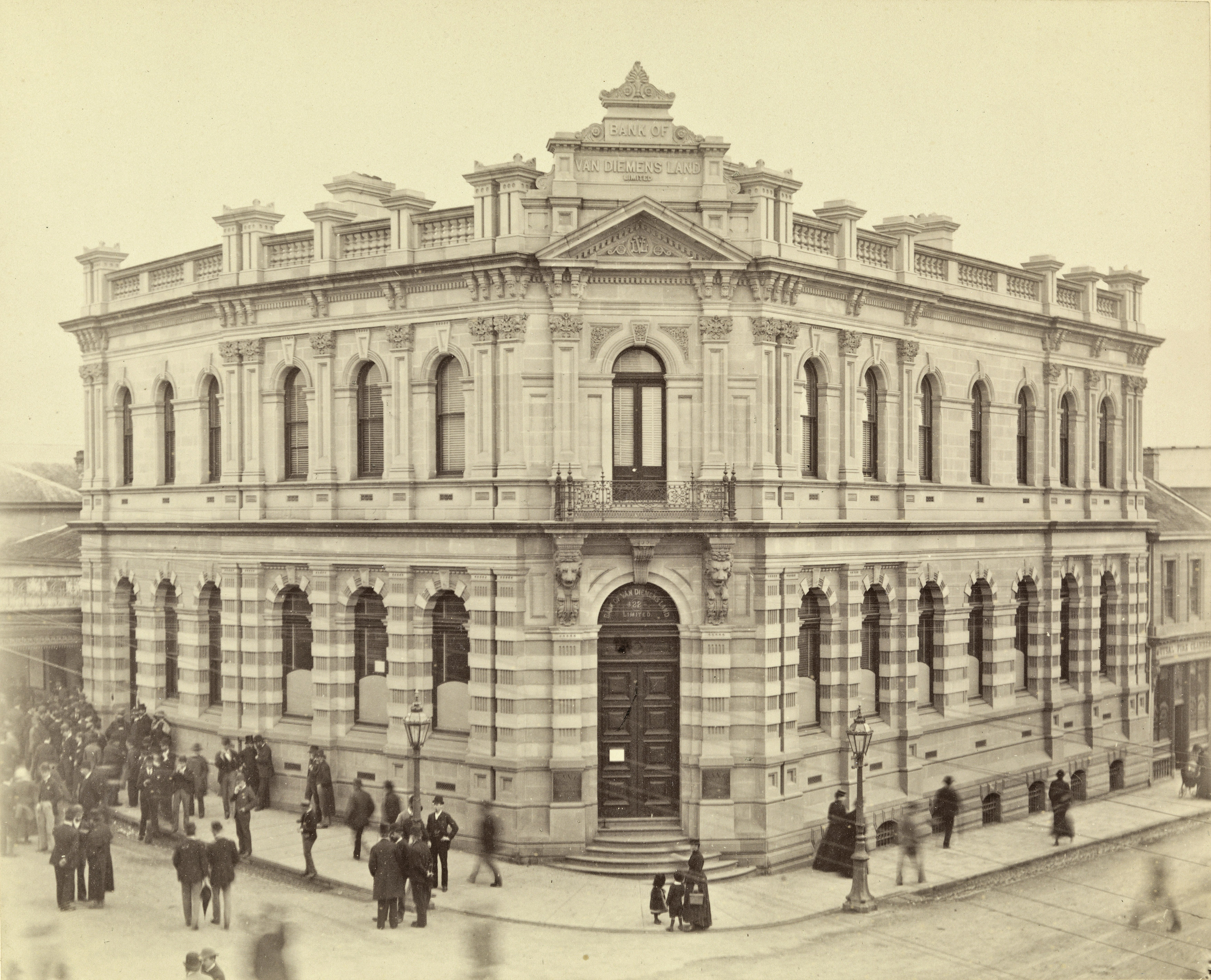
- Photo taken on day of closure (3 August 1891)
- Type: Public
- Industry: Banking and financial services
- Founded: 11 August 1823 (202 years ago)
- Defunct: 3 August 1891; 134 years ago
- Headquarters: 40 Elizabeth Street, Hobart, Tasmania, Australia
- Area served: Van Diemen's Land (1823 – 1855); Colony of Tasmania (1855 – 1891)
- Key people: George Frederick Read (1827 – 1849)

Founded in 1823, the Bank of Van Diemen's Land was the first financial institution to be established in Van Diemen's Land. Affectionally referred to as the old bank, the Bank of Van Diemen's Land traded for 68 years before becoming the first major bank failure in what would become the Australian banking crisis of 1893.

== History ==
During the British colonisation of Tasmania, a charter was granted by Sir Thomas Brisbane, with capital divided into shares worth 200 dollars each. The Bank of Van Diemen's Land was established on 11 August 1823. Located within a premises on Macquarie Street, Hobart the bank commenced trading on Monday 15 March 1824. Merchant George Frederick Read served as the Bank of Van Diemen's Land's managing director from 1827 to 1849 and was one of the institution's founding shareholders. Other founding shareholders included former convict and brewer George Gatehouse, John Beamont, a free settler and public servant, and Thomas Lempriere

Throughout Read's tenure, the Bank of Van Diemen's Land was well-managed and conservative in its lending practices. This helped to ensure the bank's financial stability and reduced the risk of bad debts. Additionally, the bank benefited from the growth of the colony's economy during the 19th century, as new industries such as agriculture and mining emerged.

Over time, the Bank of Van Diemen's Land became an important financial institution in Van Diemen's Land and later for the Colony of Tasmania, providing banking services to businesses, farmers, and free settlers. It played a significant role in the economic development of the island, financing the construction of roads, bridges, and other infrastructure.

=== Collapse ===
Although it had a reputation for reliability, during the 1880s the bank lent heavily to settlers who invested heavily in silver mining ventures. When the mineral prices crashed during the 1890s depression, the bank was unable to survive the number of defaulting loans. The bank closed in August 1891, and offered up its banking premises as a £1 lottery ticket.

Following the bank's demise, a Royal Commission was established to investigate allegations of fraudulent activities.

== Commissary notes ==
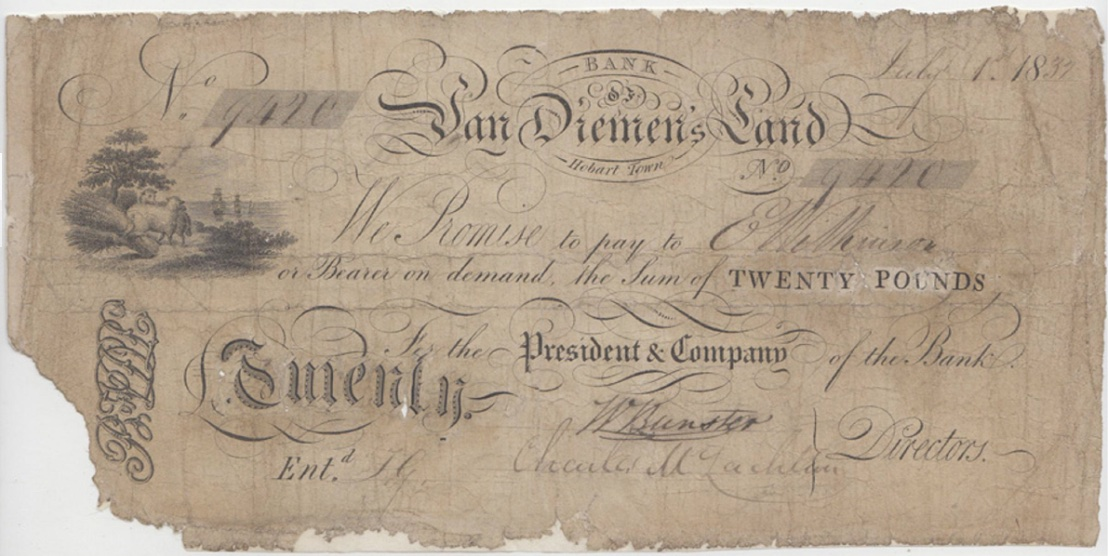
A commissary banknote fraudulently altered from £1 to £20

The Bank of Van Diemen's Land started issuing its official banknotes in 1825. The bank held a commercial monopoly in Van Diemen's Land until the establishment of the Derwent Bank in 1828.

== Head office building ==
Designed by architect Henry Hunter, the Bank of Van Diemen's Land headquarters stood 17 metres (55 ft) tall with a 22-metre (72 ft) frontage along Collins and a 25-metre (83 ft) frontage along Elizabeth Street in downtown Hobart. The building was constructed with white sandstone from Tea Tree quarries, Brighton and a darker brown stone from Hestercombe quarries, Bridgewater. The two stones were used to create alternating bands along the building's façade. Constructed at a cost of £21,000, the premises officially opened on the 12 October 1885. The two-story building was demolished in 1958. The sandstone lions sculpted by artist W. Paterson which stood over the original doorway were relocated to the entranceway of St David's Park.

== Operations ==
The bank was headed by a president with six directors, two of which would rotate out each year, a cashier, a principle, and an assistant accountant overseeing company operations.

== Sources ==
- Stone, Carolyn R.; Tyson, Pamela (1978). Old Hobart Town and Environs 1802-1855. Pioneer Design Studios. ISBN 0909674086.
- Blainey, Geoffrey (2016). The Story of Australia's People: The Rise and Rise of a New Australia. Penguin Books. ISBN 9780670078028.
- West, John (1852). The History of Tasmania. Vol. 1. Dowling, Launceston.
