= List of Queensland commissions of inquiry =

This is a list of commissions of inquiry in Queensland.

== 19th Century ==
- Royal Commission on the management of the Woogaroo Lunatic Asylum and the Lunatic Reception Houses of the Colony (1877)
- Royal Commission into the Constitution, Administration and Working of the Criminal Investigation Branch of the Police Force of Queensland (1899)

== 20th Century ==
=== 1900–1949 ===
- Royal Commission of Inquiry on Licensing and Liquor Laws (1901)
- Royal Commission into the Kedron Park Racecourse (1921)
- Royal Commission of Inquiry into Collinsville State Coal Mine (1923)
- Royal Commission on Racing and Racecourses (1930)
- Commission of Inquiry into the Escape of Certain Prisoners from HM Prison, Brisbane (1947)
- Commission of Inquiry into the Sawmilling Industry, the Industry of the Manufacture of Plywood and the Industry of the Manufacture of Joinery in the State of Queensland (1949)

=== 1950–1969 ===
- Royal Commission into Allegations of Corruption relating to dealing with certain Crown Leaseholds in Queensland (1956)
- Commission of Inquiry into the Farm Home for Boys, Westbrook (1961)
- Royal Commission Appointed to Inquire into and Report on Certain Matters Relating to Members of the Police Force and the National Hotel (1963)
- Herberton Hospital Inquiry (1963)
- Committee of Inquiry into Matters Concerning The Valuation of Lands In Queensland (1966)

=== 1970–1989 ===
- Commission Of Inquiry Into Circumstances Surrounding Certain Matters Relating To Robert Andrew Somerville (1972)
- Commission of Inquiry into the Status of Women in Queensland (1974)
- Royal Commission of Inquiry into Drug Trafficking (1981)
- Fitzgerald Inquiry (1987–1989)
- Parliamentary Judges Commission of Inquiry (1988–1989)

=== 1990–1999 ===
- Commission of Inquiry into the Care and Treatment of Patients in the Psychiatric Unit of the Townsville General Hospital (1991)
- Commission of Inquiry into Operation Trident (1993)
- Commission of Inquiry into Abuse of Children in Queensland Institutions – commonly known as the Forde Inquiry (1998–1999)

== 21st Century ==
=== 2000–2009 ===
- Racing Industry Review Panel (2004)
- Queensland Public Hospitals Commission of Inquiry (2005)
- Queensland Fuel Subsidy Commission of Inquiry (2007)

=== 2010–2019 ===
- Queensland Floods Commission of Inquiry (2011)
- Queensland Child Protection Commission of Inquiry (2012–2013)
- Queensland Health Payroll System Commission of Inquiry (2013)
- Queensland Racing Commission of Inquiry (2013–2014)
- Queensland Organised Crime Commission of Inquiry (2015)
- Grantham Floods Commission of Inquiry (2015)
- Barrett Adolescent Centre Commission of Inquiry (2015–2016)
- Queensland Rail Train Crewing Practices Commission of Inquiry (2016–2017)

=== 2020–2029 ===
- Commission of Inquiry into Forensic DNA Testing in Queensland (2022)
  - Subsequent Inquiry: Commission of Inquiry to examine DNA Project 13 concerns (2023)
- Commission of Inquiry relating to the Crime and Corruption Commission (2022)
- Independent Commission of Inquiry into Queensland Police Service responses to domestic and family violence (2022)
- Child Safety Commission of Inquiry (2025–)
- Commission of Inquiry into the CFMEU and Misconduct in the Construction Industry (2025–)
