= List of ship launches in 1874 =

The list of ship launches in 1874 includes a chronological list of some ships launched in 1874.

Date	Ship	Class / type	Builder	Location	Country	Notes
1 January	Berserk	Hildur-class monitor	Motala Verkstad	Norrköping	Sweden	For Royal Swedish Navy.
1 January	Oakworth	Merchantman	Messrs. William Hamilton & Co.	Port Glasgow	United Kingdom	For Messrs. Hargrove, Ferguson & Jackson.
3 January	Star of Bengal	Full-rigged ship	Harland and Wolff	Belfast	United Kingdom	For J. P. Corry & Co.
5 January	Perthshire	Merchantman	Messrs. Brown & Simpson	Dundee	United Kingdom	For Messrs. Thomas Law & Co.
17 January	Venice	Steamship	Messrs. Withy, Alexander & Co.	Hartlepool	United Kingdom	For private owner.
19 January	Battle Axe	Barque	Messrs MacFayden & Co.	Port Glasgow	United Kingdom	For Messrs. Burgess, Shaddock & Co.
20 January	Sunbeam	Steam yacht	Bowdler & Chaffer	Seacombe	United Kingdom	For Thomas Brassey.
21 January	Cybele	Steamship	Messrs. Alexander Stephen & Sons	Linthouse	United Kingdom	For Messrs. Donaldson Bros.
23 January	Almirante Cochrane	Almirante Cochrane-class ironclad	Earle's Shipbuilding	Hull	United Kingdom	For Chilean Navy.
23 January	Forcados	Steamship	Messrs. Cunliffe & Dunlop	Port Glasgow	United Kingdom	For British and African Steam Navigation Company.
23 January	No. 11	Steam lighter	Messrs. J. & R. Swan	Maryhill	United Kingdom	For Carron Company.
24 January	Hugh Barclay	Schooner	Messrs. Barclay & Son	Ardrossan	United Kingdom	For private owner.
2 February	Pharos	Paddle steamer	Messrs. R. Napier & Sons	Govan	United Kingdom	For Commissioners of Northern Light Houses.
3 February	Britannic	Passenger ship	Harland & Wolff	Belfast	United Kingdom	For White Star Line.
3 February	Valiant	Fishing trawler	John Barter & Son	Brixham	United Kingdom	For Richard P. Mills Sr. and others.
4 February	Daring	Fantome-class sloop	Blackwall Yard	Blackwall	United Kingdom	For Royal Navy.
5 February	Cinderella	Steam yacht	Messrs. T. B. Seath & Co.	Rutherglen	United Kingdom	For E. H. Scott.
7 February	Bruce	Steamship	Messrs. Alexander Stephen & Sons	Linthouse	United Kingdom	For Messrs. Gibbs, Bright & Co.
14 February	Utopia	Passenger ship	Robert Duncan & Co.	Glasgow	United Kingdom	For Anchor Line.
16 February	Achille	Steamship	Messrs. William Denny & Bros.	Dumbarton	United Kingdom	For Österreichischer Lloyd.
16 February	Adonis	Steamship	Barrow Ship Building Co. Ltd.	Barrow-in-Furness	United Kingdom	For Messrs. James Little & Co.
16 February	Ithuriel	Steamship	John Key	Kinghorn	United Kingdom	For Messrs. Blyth Bros.
16 February	Mayflower	Schooner	John Barter & Son	Brixham	United Kingdom	For William R. Pearce and others.
16 February	Udston	Merchantman	Messrs. Barclay, Curle & Co.	Glasgow	United Kingdom	For Messrs. Potter, Wilson & Co.
16 February	W. A. Scholten	Steamship	Robert Napier & Sons	Glasgow	United Kingdom	For Nederlandsch-Amerikaansche Stoomvaart Maatschappij.
17 February	Express	Steamship	Messrs. R. Duncan & Sons	West Hartlepool	United Kingdom	For Dublin and Liverpool Screw Steam Packet Co.
17 February	Faraday	Cable ship	C. Mitchell & Company	Aberdeen	United Kingdom	For Siemens Brothers.
17 February	Friedrich Krupp	Steamship	Messrs. M. Pearse & Co.	Stockton-on-Tees	United Kingdom	For Friedrich Krupp.
17 February	Turkestan	Full-rigged ship	Messrs. Richardson, Duck & Co.	South Stockton	United Kingdom	For British and Eastern Shipping Company (Limited).
18 February	Clan Macleod	Barque	Bartram, Haswell & Co.	Sunderland	United Kingdom	For T. Dunlop.
18 February	Jeannie	Steamship	Messrs. Withy, Alexander & Co.	Hartlepool	United Kingdom	For Messrs. Coverdale, Merryweather & Todd.
18 February	Liguria	Steamship	Messrs. Elder & Co.	Govan	United Kingdom	For Pacific Steam Navigation Company.
19 February	Waterford	Paddle steamer	William Simons & Co.	Renfrew	United Kingdom	For Great Western Railway.
21 February	Ben Macdui	Steamship	Messrs. Hall, Russell & Co.	Aberdeen	United Kingdom	For Messrs. J. & A. Davidson.
28 February	Foam	Steamship	Messrs. Turnbull & Son	Whitby	United Kingdom	For Messrs. T. C. Watson & Co.
28 February	Pansy	Steamship	Messrs. Turnball & Son	Whitby	United Kingdom	For Messrs. T. E. Watson & Sons.
2 March	Eva Hewson	Humber Keel	G. Brown	Hull	United Kingdom	For William Hewson.
2 March	Rodney	Clipper	William Pile	Sunderland	United Kingdom	For Devitt and Moore.
3 March	Dunedin	Full-rigged refrigerated cargo ship	Robert Duncan & Co.	Port Glasgow	United Kingdom	For Albion Line.
3 March	James Harris	Steamship	Messrs. Raylton, Dixon & Co.	Middlesbrough-on-Tees	United Kingdom	For Messrs. Hogg & Henderson.
4 March	Bothnia	Steamship	J. & G. Thomson	Clydebank	United Kingdom	For Cunard Line.
4 March	General Werder	Steamship	Messrs. Caird & Co.	Greenock	United Kingdom	For Norddeutscher Lloyd.
4 March	Hornet	Steamship	Messrs. Blackwood & Gordon	Port Glasgow	United Kingdom	For Messrs. Burns.
4 March	Queen Anne	Steamship	Messrs. Charles Connell & Co.	Scotstoun	United Kingdom	For Queen Steamship Co.
5 March	Intrepid	Torpedo ram	Boston Navy Yard	Boston, Massachusetts	United States	For United States Navy.
5 March	Ontario	Steamship	Messrs. Archibald M'Millan & Co.	Dumbarton	United Kingdom	For Mississippi and Dominion Steamship Co.
5 March	Villa de Bilbao	Steamship	Messrs. Cunliffe & Dunlop	Port Glasgow	United Kingdom	For Messrs. William Cruickshanks & Co.
6 March	Chrysolite	Schooner	Irvine Co-operative Shipbuilding Co	Irvine	United Kingdom	For William Robertson.
6 March	Uruguay	Corvette	Laird Brothers	Birkenhead	United Kingdom	For Argentine Navy.
10 March	Lobo	Steamship	Messrs. John Elder & Co	Fairfield	United Kingdom	For Pacific Steam Navigation Company.
12 March	Ierne	Steamship	Messrs. A. & J. Inglis	Pointhouse	United Kingdom	For Messrs. H. McPhail & Co.
14 March	Richard Rush	Dexter-class cutter	Atlantic Works Company	Boston, Massachusetts	United States	For United States Revenue Cutter Service.
19 March	City of Peking	Steamship	John Roach & Sons	Chester, Pennsylvania	United States	For Pacific Mail Steamship Company.
19 March	SMS Kaiser	Kaiser-class ironclad	Samuda Brothers	Cubitt Town	United Kingdom	For Imperial German Navy.
19 March	Maritana	Merchantman	Messrs. Dobie & Co.	Govan	United Kingdom	For Messrs. Singleton, Dunn & Co.
19 March	Prinses Amalia	Passenger liner	John Elder & Co.	Govan	United Kingdom	For Stoomvaart Maatschappij Nederland.
20 March	Cumberland Lassie	Merchantman	William Thomas	Amlwch	United Kingdom	For William Thomas.
20 March	Mairi Bhan	Merchantman	Messrs. Barclay, Curle & Co.	Glasgow	United Kingdom	For Peter M'Intyre.
21 March	Prado	Steamship	Messrs. Bowdler, Chaffer & Co.	Seacombe	United Kingdom	For Messrs. Strong, Reid & Page.
25 March	Vesuvius	Torpedo ship		Pembroke Dockyard	United Kingdom	For Royal Navy.
30 March	Holland	Steamship	Fijenoord	Rotterdam	Netherlands	For Nederlandse Stoomboot Maatschappij.
March	Enna	Steamship	Fratelli Orlando	Livorno	Italy	For La Trinacria Societa di Navigazione a Vapeur.
March	Ermenilda	Schooner		Milford Haven	United Kingdom	For private owner.
March	Forth	Barge	Bowdler, Chaffer & Co.	Seacombe	United Kingdom	For Worsley Battersby.
March	Gowy	Barge	Bowdler, Chaffer & Co.	Seacombe	United Kingdom	For Worsley Battersby.
March	Lochnagar	Steamship	Robert Thompson Jr.	Sunderland	United Kingdom	For Adam & Co.
March	Temple	Steamship	Messrs. R. Roberts & Co.	Trefriw	United Kingdom	For Messrs. R. Roberts & Co.
2 April	Apollo	Steamship	Barrow Ship Building Co. Ltd.	Barrow-in-Furness	United Kingdom	For Messrs. James Little & Co.
2 April	Ennerdale	Merchantman	Messrs. W. H. Potter & Co.	Liverpool	United Kingdom	For Messrs. Newton & Co.
2 April	Oremer	Steamship	Messrs. M. Pearse & Co.	Stockton-on-Tees	United Kingdom	For Friedrich Krupp.
3 April	Glenfinlas	Steamship	London and Glasgow Engineering and Iron Shipbuilding Company	Glasgow	United Kingdom	For Glen Line.
3 April	Glenshee	Steamship	J. G. Lawrie	Whiteinch	United Kingdom	For private owner.
3 April	Peterborough	Merchantman	Messrs. Richardson, Duck & Co.	South Stockton	United Kingdom	For Merchant Shipping Co.
7 April	Camerata	Steamship	Messrs. John Redhead & Co.	South Shields	United Kingdom	For Messrs. Adam & Co.
14 April	Vale	Vale-class gunboat	Karljohansvern	Horten	Norway	For Royal Norwegian Navy.
15 April	Eliza Ramsden	Barque	Messrs. Barclay, Curle & Co.	Glasgow	United Kingdom	For Samuel Ramsden.
16 April	Bolivia	Steamship	Messrs. Thomas Wingate & Co.	Whiteinch	United Kingdom	For Pacific Steam Navigation Company.
17 April	Neva	Cutter	John Fyfe	Fairlie	United Kingdom	For R. Holms Kerr.
17 April	Quoanimo	Merchantman		Frampton-on-Severn	United Kingdom	For Messrs. Davis & Muse.
18 April	Achilles	Steamship	Barrow Ship Building Co. Ltd.	Barrow-in-Furness	United Kingdom	For Messrs. James Little & Co.
18 April	Duke of Lancaster	Steamship	Barrow Ship Building Co. Ltd.	Barrow-in-Furness	United Kingdom	For Eastern Steamship Company.
18 April	Glengarnock	Steamship	Messrs. T. B. Seath & Co.	Rutherglen	United Kingdom	For Messrs. Merry & Cuninghame.
18 April	Hildegard	Yacht	Messrs. Camper & Nicholson	Gosport	United Kingdom	For Gilbert W. Moss.
18 April	Lavernock	Steamship	Messrs. Schlesinger, Davis & Co.	Wallsend-on-Tyne	United Kingdom	For Messrs. C. E. Stallybrass & Co.
18 April	Madeline	Steamship	Messrs. Withy, Alexander & Co	Middleton	United Kingdom	For Messrs. Pyman, Bell & Co.
18 April	Rhenania	Steamship	Messrs. Caird & Co.	Greenock	United Kingdom	For Hamburg-Amerikanische Packetfahrt-Actien-Gesellschaft.
18 April	Waratah	Steamship	Messrs. Hall, Russell & Co	Aberdeen	United Kingdom	For private owner.
20 April	Africa	Steamship	Messrs. William Denny & Bros.	Dumbarton	United Kingdom	For British India Steam Navigation Company.
21 April	Windflower	Yawl	Messrs. Camper & Nicholson	Gosport	United Kingdom	For C. Davies.
29 April	Caledonian	Steamship	Messrs. John Elder & Co.	Govan	United Kingdom	For Ardrossan Shipping Co.
April	Robina Dunlop	Barque	J. Crown	Sunderland	United Kingdom	For J. Neil.
1 May	Rotterdam	Steamship	Messrs. M'Kellar, M'Millan & Co.	Dumbarton	United Kingdom	For Messrs. James Rankine & Sons.
2 May	Calypso	Merchantman	Messrs. Alexander Hall & Sons	Aberdeen	United Kingdom	For William Shirres and John Leslie.
2 May	Corinne	Yacht	Ratsey	Cowes	United Kingdom	For private owner.
2 May	Cythera	Yacht	Fyfe	Fairlie	United Kingdom	For David Richardson.
2 May	Goshawk	Yacht	Hansen	Cowes	United Kingdom	For T. Hesketh.
2 May	P. Caland	Steamship	Messrs. R. Napier & Sons	Govan	United Kingdom	For Nederlandsch-Amerikaansche Stoomvaart Maatschappij.
2 May	Ruby	Steamship	Messrs. Humphrys & Pearson	Hull	United Kingdom	For John Curry and Thomas R. Thompson.
4 May	Elmina	Yacht	Messrs. Camper & Nicholson	Gosport	United Kingdom	For Sir Richard Sutton.
5 May	Canterbury	Merchantman	Messrs. Robert Duncan & Co.	Port Glasgow	United Kingdom	For Messrs. P. Henderson & Co.
5 May	Saragossa	Ocean liner	Messrs. James & George Thomson	Dalmuir	United Kingdom	For Cunard Line.
6 May	Stentor	Steamship	Messrs. Raylton, Dixon & Co.	Middlesbrough	United Kingdom	For Messrs. Blair & Co. (Limited).
12 May	Telegraph	Steam launch	Messrs. Yarrow & Hedley	Poplar	United Kingdom	For Messrs. Siemens.
13 May	City of Tokio	Steamship	John Roach & Sons	Chester, Pennsylvania	United States	For Pacific Mail Steamship Company.
13 May	Gondola	Yacht	H. Boag	Fairlie	United Kingdom	For Mr. Livingstone.
14 May	Plassey	Full-rigged ship	William Pile	Sunderland	United Kingdom	For G. D. Tyser & Co.
16 May	Angelo	Steamship	Messrs. Humphrys and Pearson	Kingston upon Hull	United Kingdom	For Wilson Line.
16 May	Cameroon	Steamship	Messrs. John Elder & Co.	Govan	United Kingdom	For British and African Steam Navigation Co.
16 May	Oregon	Barque	James Petrie	Montrose	United Kingdom	For private owner. Ran aground on being launched and was severely damaged.
16 May	Sete de Setembro	Ironclad frigate	Arsenal de Marinha da Côrte	Rio de Janeiro	Brazil	For Brazilian Navy.
16 May	Wasp	Steamship	Messrs. Blackwood & Gordon	Port Glasgow	United Kingdom	For Messrs. Burns.
16 May	No. 105	Steamship	Messrs. Raylton, Dixon & Co.	Middlesbrough	United Kingdom	For Messrs. Blair & Co.
18 May	Brenhilda	Clipper	Messrs. Barclay, Curle & Co	Whiteinch	United Kingdom	For Messrs. Hendry, Ferguson & Co.
18 May	Merksworth	Collier	John Fullerton & Co.	Merksworth	United Kingdom	For Anvil Creek Coal Mining Co.
19 May	Cordelia	Schooner	Messrs. Nichol & Bruce	Govan	United Kingdom	For John Inglis Jr.
20 May	Abergrange	Steamship	Messrs. Cunliffe & Dunlop	Port Glasgow	United Kingdom	For George G. MacKay.
20 May	Germania	Barque	Messrs. Alexander Stephen & Sons	Linthouse	United Kingdom	For Messrs. D. H. Wätjin & Co.
20 May	Limerick	Paddle steamer	William Simons & Co.	Glasgow	United Kingdom	For Great Western Railway.
20 May	Mardy	Steamship	Messrs. Schlesinger, Davis & Co.	Wallsend-on-Tyne	United Kingdom	For Messrs. J. H. Wilson & partners.
20 May	Somerset	Steamship	Messrs. Henderson, Coulborn & Co.	Renfrew	United Kingdom	For Eastern and Australian Royal Mail Steamship Co.
28 May	Emir of Nupe	Steamship	Messrs. M'Kellar, M'Millan & Co.	Dumbarton	United Kingdom	For Messrs. Alexander Miller, Brother, & Co.
29 May	Itapaum	Steamship	Messrs. Thomas Wingate & Co.	Whiteinch	United Kingdom	For private owner.
30 May	Acton Bridge	Barque	William Doxford & Sons	Sunderland	United Kingdom	For W. S. Croudace.
31 May	Bessie	Steam yacht	W. Luke	Itchen Ferry	United Kingdom	For Earl of Harrington.
May	Amy	Steam yacht	Messrs. Henderson, Coulborn & Co.	Renfrew	United Kingdom	For N. B. Stewart.
May	Blanche	Cutter	Messrs. Nichol & Bruce	Govan	United Kingdom	For Thomas A. Kemp.
May	Dumbartonshire	Merchantman	Messrs. Dobie & Co.	Govan	United Kingdom	For Messrs. T. Law & Co.
1 June	Glendale	Steamship	Messrs. Irvine & Co.	West Hartlepool	United Kingdom	For Messrs. Steel, Young & Co.
1 June	Suevia	Passenger ship	Caird & Company	Greenock	United Kingdom	For Hamburg-Amerikanische Packetfahrt-Actien-Gesellschaft.
2 June	Castalia	Paddle steamer	Thames Ironworks and Shipbuilding Company	Leamouth	United Kingdom	For English Channel Steamship Co.
2 June	State of Nevada	Steamship	London and Glasgow Engineering and Shipbuilding Co.	Govan	United Kingdom	For State Line Steamship Co.
3 June	Brisbane	Steamship	A. & J. Inglis	Pointhouse	United Kingdom	For Eastern and Australian Steam Mailship Co Ltd.
3 June	Ethiopia	Steamship	Messrs. William Denny & Bros.	Dumbarton	United Kingdom	For British India Steam Navigation Company (Limited).
3 June	Sardinian	Steamship	Robert Steele & Co.	Greenock	United Kingdom	For Allan Line.
13 June	Enterprise	Enterprise-class sloop	John W. Griffiths	Kittery, Maine	United States	For United States Navy.
15 June	Benguela	Steamship	Messrs. John Elder & Co.	Fairfield	United Kingdom	For British and African Steam Navigation Co.
15 June	Romulus	Steamship	Joseph L. Thompson	Sunderland	United Kingdom	For J. H. W. Culliford.
15 June	Salier	Steamship	Messrs. Earle's Shipbuilding and Engineering Co.	Hull	United Kingdom	For Norddeutscher Lloyd.
16 June	Boadicea	Schooner	Messrs. Camper & Nicholson	Gosport	United Kingdom	For C. Thellasson.
16 June	Carmania	Barque	Bowdler, Chaffer & Co.	Seacombe	United Kingdom	For William Nicol.
16 June	James Hogg	Steamship	Messrs. Raylton, Dixon & Co.	Middlesbrough	United Kingdom	For Messrs. Hogg & Henderson.
16 June	Wieland	Steamship	Messrs. Alexander Stephen & Sons	Linthouse	United Kingdom	For Eagle Line.
17 June	Ballina	Steamship	Bowdler, Chaffer & Co.	Seacombe	United Kingdom	For Charles W. Pollexfen.
19 June	Amazonis	Steamship	Messrs. John Reid & Co.	Port Glasgow	United Kingdom	For Compani Sud Americani.
19 June	Stuart Hahnemann	Merchantman	Messrs. Archibal M'Millan & Son	Dumbarton	United Kingdom	For Messrs. Stuart & Douglas.
20 June	Francesca	Yacht	Messrs. Earle's	Hull	United Kingdom	For Duke of Marlborough.
30 June	Accrington Lass	Schooner	Paul Rodgers	Carrickfergus	United Kingdom	For Messrs. Bradshaw & Pilkington.
30 June	Ayresome	Steamship	Messrs. Raylton, Dixon & Co.	Middlesbrough	United Kingdom	For Messrs. Rayner & Murry.
30 June	Klopstock	Steamship	Messrs. James & George Thomson	Dalmuir	United Kingdom	For Eagle Line.
30 June	Milton	Steamship	Messrs. E. Witby & Co.	Hartlepool	United Kingdom	For Glocver & Co.
30 June	Viking	Steamship	Messrs. Aitken & Mansel	Whiteinch	United Kingdom	For Messrs. William Ross & Co.
June	Design	Ketch	Charles W. Aubin	Jersey	(United Kingdom of Great Britain and Ireland) Jersey	For Philip Daniel Payn.
3 July	Daylight	Steamship	Messrs. Swan	Maryhill	United Kingdom	For Messrs. Marshall & Ross.
4 July	Earl Spencer	Paddle steamer	Cammell Laird	Birkenhead	United Kingdom	For London and North Western Railway.
13 July	Constance	Steamship	Messrs. Thomas Turnbull & Sons	Whitby	United Kingdom	For George Pyman & Co.
14 July	Voorwarts	Steamship	Messrs. John Elder & Co.	Govan	United Kingdom	For Stoomvaart Maatschappij Nederland.
15 July	Germanic	Ocean Liner	Harland and Wolff	Belfast	United Kingdom	For White Star Line.
15 July	Hyperion	Merchantman	Garlick	Knottingley	United Kingdom	For Brothers Perfect.
15 July	Thessalus	Merchantman	Messrs. Barclay, Curle & Co.	Glasgow	United Kingdom	For Messrs. A. & J. H. Carmichael.
17 July	Auckland	Clipper	Messrs. Robert Duncan & Co.	Port Glasgow	United Kingdom	For Messrs P. Henderson & Co.
28 July	Rhondda	Steamship	Messrs. E. Withy & Co. Ltd.	West Hartlepool	United Kingdom	For W. G. Edwards.
30 July	Amarapoora	Steamship	Messrs. Scott & Co.	Cartsdyke	United Kingdom	For Messrs. P. Henderson & Co.
20 July	Duchess of Argyle	Merchantman	Messrs. Richardson, Duck & Co.	South Stockton	United Kingdom	For W. & R. Wright.
29 July	Archimedes	Steamship	Messrs. Hall, Russell & Co.	Footdee	United Kingdom	For Messrs. Lamport & Holt.
30 July	Euridice	Merchantman	Messrs. Robert Steele & Co.	Greenock	United Kingdom	For Messrs. Baine & Johnstone.
July	Alcedo	Brigantine		Prince Edward Island	Canada	For private owner.
July	Dependence	Schooner	Mr. Beale	Itchenor	United Kingdom	For Elijah John Beale.
July	Lesbian	Cargo liner	Thomas Royden & Sons	Liverpool	United Kingdom	For F. R .Leyland & Co.
July	Mary	Steamship	Messrs. T. B. Seath & Co.	Rugland	United Kingdom	For Messrs. Gregor, Turnball & Co.
July	Racer	Brigantine		Rollo Bay, Prince Edward Island	Canada	For private owner.
July	William Phillips	Schooner	David Banks & Co.	Plymouth	United Kingdom	For Phillips & Co.
4 August	Cape Race	Merchantman	Messrs. Caird & Co.	Greenock	United Kingdom	For Messrs. Lyle & Sons.
11 August	Britannia	Barque	Messrs. Alexander Stephen & Sons	Govan	United Kingdom	For Messrs. D. H. Wätjen & Co.
12 August	Lochee	Clipper	Messrs. Alexander Stephen & Sons	Dundee	United Kingdom	For private owner.
12 August	Rover	Rover-class corvette	Thames Ironworks and Shipbuilding Company	Leamouth	United Kingdom	For Royal Navy.
13 August	Arden Connell	Clipper	Messrs. Macfayden & Co.	Port Glasgow	United Kingdom	For Messrs. John Bremner & Co.
13 August	Lammermoor	East Indiaman	Messrs. John Reid & Co.	Port Glasgow	United Kingdom	For Waverly Line.
13 August	Sexta	Steamship	Messrs. W. Gray & Co.	West Hartlepool	United Kingdom	For Flensburg Steam Shipping Co.
14 August	Viking	Steamship	Messrs. J. & R. Swan	Dumbarton	United Kingdom	For West Highland Carrying Company.
15 August	Belfast	Sailing ship	Harland & Wolff	Belfast	United Kingdom	For T. & J. Brocklebank.
15 August	Nelson	Clipper	Messrs. Robert Duncan & Co.	Port Glasgow	United Kingdom	For Messrs. P. Henderson & Co.
15 August	Rossdhu	East Indiaman	James E. Scott	Cartsdyke	United Kingdom	For William Turner.
18 August	Endeavour	Fishing yawl	Ebenezer Robertson	Ipswich	United Kingdom	For Mr. Nickerson.
18 August	G. Broughton	Barque	Messrs. Alexander Stephen & Sons	Linthouse	United Kingdom	For private owner.
27 August	Fleurs Castle	Steamship	Messrs. James & George Thompson	Dalmuir	United Kingdom	For Castle Lin3.
27 August	Indiana	Steamship	Messrs. Thomas Wingate & Sons	Whiteinch	United Kingdom	For State Line.
27 August	Leyte	Steamship	Messrs. A. & J. Inglis	Pointhouse	United Kingdom	For Messrs. Peele, Hubbell & Co.
27 August	Maju	Full-rigged ship	Brown & Simpson	Dundee	United Kingdom	For Killick, Martin & Co.
28 August	State of Florida	Steamship	London and Glasgow Shipbuilding Co.	Govan	United Kingdom	For State Line Co.
29 August	Allanshaw	Full-rigged ship	William Simons & Co.	Renfrew	United Kingdom	For J. G. Potter & Co.
29 August	Avalanche	Merchantman	Messrs. A. Hall & Co.	Aberdeen	United Kingdom	For Messrs. Shaw, Lowell & Co.
29 August	Donna Isabel	Steamship	Messrs. Cunliffe & Dunlop	Port Glasgow	United Kingdom	For Rio Grande do Sul Steamship Company (Limited).
29 August	El Plata	Ironclad	Messrs. Laird	Birkenhead	United Kingdom	For Argentine Navy.
29 August	Plurus	Paddle steamer	Thames Ironworks and Shipbuilding Company	Blackwall	United Kingdom	For Imperial Government of Brazil.
29 August	St. Enoch	Merchantman	Messrs. Dobie & Co.	Govan	United Kingdom	For private owner.
29 August	Unity	Steamship	Messrs. Turnbull & Son	Whitby	United Kingdom	For Mr. Wilberforce and others.
30 August	Glenville	Schooner	N. Gibbon	South Hylton	United Kingdom	For Mr. Meek.
31 August	Amboyna	Steamship	Messrs. Blackwood & Gordon	Port Glasgow	United Kingdom	For Netherlands India Steam Navigation Company.
31 August	Canara	Steamship	Messrs. William Denny & Bros.	Dumbarton	United Kingdom	For British India Steam Navigation Company
31 August	Conde d'Eau	Steamship	Messrs. William Hamilton & Co.	Port Glasgow	United Kingdom	For Rio Grande do Sul Steamship Co. (Limited).
31 August	Mary C. Wilson	Coaster	Messrs. H. Murray & Co.	Kingston	United Kingdom	For John Wilson.
August	Baron Aberdare	Full-rigged ship	W. Watson	Sunderland	United Kingdom	For James MacCunn.
August	Ross Dhu	Merchantman	J. E. Scott	Cartsdyle	United Kingdom	For private owner.
August	Thibet	Merchantman		Dundee	United Kingdom	For Peninsular and Oriental Steam Navigation Company.
1 September	Czaverena	Imperial yacht	Messrs. Earle's	Kingston upon Hull	United Kingdom	For Alexander II of Russia.
1 September	San Marcos	Steamship	Messrs. A. M'Millan & Son	Dumbarton	United Kingdom	For Liverpool and Texas Steamship Co.
2 September	Lismore	Paddle tug	Barrow Ship Building Co. Ltd.	Barrow-in-Furness	United Kingdom	For Lord Cavendish & Sir James Ramsden.
10 September	Berengaria	Steamship	Messrs. Barclay, Curle & Co.	Glasgow	United Kingdom	For Messrs. Hendry, Ferguson & Co.
10 September	Cupella	Steamship	Messrs. Palmer & Co.	Jarrow	United Kingdom	For Messrs John Fenwick & Co.
10 September	Independencia	Ironclad	Messrs. Dudgeon	Cubitt Town	United Kingdom	For Imperial Brazilian Navy. Severely damaged on Launch. Subsequently acquired by the Royal Navy.
12 September	Deutschland	Kaiser-class ironclad	Samuda Brothers	Cubitt Town	United Kingdom	For Imperial German Navy.
12 September	Prado	Steamship	Messrs. E. Withy & Co.	Hartlepool	United Kingdom	For Brazilian Iron Steam Ship Co.
12 September	Severn	Steamship	Messrs. David & William Henderson & Co	Meadowside	United Kingdom	For Messrs. W. Sloan & Co.
14 September	Charlotte Croom	East Indiaman	Messrs. Charles Connell & Co.	Whiteinch	United Kingdom	For Messrs. William & Alfred Brown & Co.
15 September	Aurora	East Indiaman	Messrs. Robert Steele & Co.	Greenock	United Kingdom	For private owner.
15 September	Maggie	Humber Keel	William Hill	Hull	United Kingdom	For Messrs C. &. W. Ford.
16 September	Orion	Steamship	Messrs. Henry Murray & Co.	Port Glasgow	United Kingdom	For Det Bergenske Dampskipsselskap.
16 September	Tavoy	Paddle steamer	Messrs. Robert Duncan & Co.	Port Glasgow	United Kingdom	For private owner.
17 September	Chusan	Paddle steamer	Messrs. John Elder & Co.	Fairfield	United Kingdom	For Messrs. Baring Bros. & Co.
18 September	Alert	Alert-class gunboat	John Roach & Sons	Chester, Pennsylvania	United States	For United States Navy.
20 September	Friedrich der Grosse	Preussen-class ironclad	Kaiserliche Werft	Kiel	Germany	For Imperial German Navy.
21 September	Cyprian	Steamship	Bowdler, Chaffer & Co.	Seacombe	United Kingdom	For Frederick R. Leyland.
24 September	Bessemer	Paddle steamer	Earle's Shipbuilding	Hull	United Kingdom	For Sir Henry Bessemer.
24 September	Sapphire	Amethyst-class corvette	Devonport Dockyard	Plymouth	United Kingdom	For Royal Navy.
26 September	Assistance	Troopship	Messrs. H. & R. Green	Blackwall	United Kingdom	For Royal Navy.
26 September	Cape Verde	Clipper	Messrs. Thomas Wingate & Co.	Whiteinch	United Kingdom	For Messrs. Abram Lyle & Sons.
26 September	Cyrenian	Steamship	Messrs. Bowdler, Chaffer & Co.	Seacombe	United Kingdom	For Messrs. Frederick Leyland & Co.
26 September	Diamond	Amethyst-class corvette		Sheerness Dockyard	United Kingdom	For Royal Navy.
26 September	Fitzclarence	Steamship	T. R. Oswald	Pallion	United Kingdom	For Burrell & Son.
26 September	Marguerite Franchetti	Steamship	Messrs. Henderson, Coulborn & Co.	Renfrew	United Kingdom	For private owner.
26 September	Meiji Maru	Steamship	Messrs. R. Napier & Sons	Govan	United Kingdom	For Imperial Japanese Government.
26 September	Trident	Steamship	Messrs. Palmer	Jarrow-on-Tyne	United Kingdom	For Messrs. Hall Bros.
26 September	Wellington	Clipper	Messrs. Robert Duncan & Co.	Port Glasgow	United Kingdom	For Messrs. Patrick Henderson & Co.
28 September	Celtic	Steamship	Messrs. John Fullarton & Co.	Merksworth	United Kingdom	For Messrs. J. & J. Macfarlane.
28 September	Singapore	Steamship	Messrs. A. & J. Inglis	Pointhouse	United Kingdom	For Eastern and Australian Mail Steamship Co.
30 September	Dinas	Steamship	Messrs. Schlesinger, Davis & Co,	Wallsend	United Kingdom	For private owner.
30 September	Prins Hendrik	Steamship	John Elder & Co.	Govan	United Kingdom	For Stoomvaart Maatschappij Nederland.
September	Djemnah	Cargo liner		La Ciotat	United Kingdom	For Compagnie des Messageries Maritimes.
2 October	W. W. Story	Pilot boat	Samuel H. Pine	Greenpoint, New York	United States	For Thomas Conley, Alexander Cochrane and Cisco Cumskey.
8 October	Copeland	Steamship	London and Glasgow Shipbuilding Co.	Govan	United Kingdom	For Clyde Shipping Co.
10 October	Breeze	Steamship	Messrs. Withy & Co.	Middleton	United Kingdom	For private owner.
12 October	Bargany	Merchantman	Messrs. A. M'Millan & Son	Dumbarton	United Kingdom	For Messrs. John Kerr & Co.
12 October	Brecon	Steamship	Messrs. R. & J. Evans	Liverpool	United Kingdom	For Messrs. Richards, Mills & Co.
12 October	Goa	Steamship	Messrs. William Denny & Bros.	Dumbarton	United Kingdom	For British India Steam Navigation Company.
12 October	James Drake	Steamship	Bartram, Haswell & Co	Sunderland	United Kingdom	For Wilkie & Turnbull.
13 October	Arab	Arab-class gunvessel	Robert Napier and Sons	Govan	United Kingdom	For Royal Navy.
14 October	Banda	Steamship	Messrs. Blackwood & Gordon	Port Glasgow	United Kingdom	For Netherlands India Steam Navigation Company.
14 October	Edeline	Steam yacht	Troon Shipbuilding Co.	Troon	United Kingdom	For Earl De La Warr.
14 October	Princess Beatrice	Steamship	Messrs. David & William Henderson	Partick	United Kingdom	For Messrs. M. Langlands & Sons.
17 October	Rosia	Steamship	Messrs. H. Murray & Co.	Port Glasgow	United Kingdom	For John Murray.
23 October	Vandalia	Sloop-of-war		Boston Navy Yard	United States	For United States Navy.
24 October	Adams	Enterprise-class sloop	Donald MacKay	Boston, Massachusetts	United States	For United States Navy.
24 October	Cape Finisterre	Barque	Messrs. Wingate & Co.	Whiteinch	United Kingdom	For Messrs. Abram Lyle & Son.
24 October	Ganos	Steamship	Messrs. Richardson, Duck & Co.	South Stockton-on-Tees	United Kingdom	For Messrs. Henry Briggs & Co.
24 October	Sir S. Galahad	Steamship	Messrs. Turnbull & Son	Whitby	United Kingdom	For Messrs. Richards, Power & Co.
24 October	Barque	For Mr. Hodgson.	Govan	South Glen	Messrs. Dobie & Co.	
26 October	Dredger No. 1	Dredger	Barrow Ship Building Co. Ltd.	Barrow-in-Furness	United Kingdom	For private owner.
26 October	Firth of Clyde	Merchantman	Messrs. M'Kellar, M'Millan & Co.	Dumbarton	United Kingdom	For L. Macpherson.
26 October	Javary	Javary-class monitor	Société Nouvelle des Forges et Chantiers de la Méditerranée	La Seyne-sur-Mer	France	For Imperial Brazilian Navy.
26 October	Oamaru	Merchantman	Messrs. Scott & Co.	Cartsdyke	United Kingdom	For Messrs. P. Henderson & Co.
26 October	Pioneer	Gunboat	Blumer & Co.	Sunderland	United Kingdom	For Royal Navy.
27 October	City of Berlin	Ocean liner	Caird & Company	Greenock	United Kingdom	For Inman Line.
27 October	Lily	Arab-class gunvessel	Robert Napier and Sons	Govan	United Kingdom	For Royal Navy.
27 October	Saint Lawrence	Dredger	W. Simons & Co.	Renfrew	United Kingdom	For Canadian Government.
27 October	William D. Lawrence	Full-rigged ship	William D. Lawrence Shipyard	Maitland	Canada	For William Dawson Lawrence and James Ellis.
28 October	Koning der Nederlanden	Ironclad turret ship	Rijkswerf	Amsterdam	Netherlands	For Royal Netherlands Navy.
28 October	Mesudiye	Centre-battery ironclad	Thames Iron Works	Leamouth	United Kingdom	For Ottoman Navy.
28 October	Old Kensington	Merchantman	Messrs. W. H. Potter & Co.	Liverpool	United Kingdom	For Messrs. Smith, Bilborough & Co.
28 October	Scythia	Steamship	Messrs.J. & G. Thomson	Clydebank	United Kingdom	For Cunard Line.
29 October	Los Andes	El Plata-class monitor	Messrs. Laird Bros.	Birkenhead	United Kingdom	For Argentine Navy.
October	Aurora	Brig		Cardigan	Canada	For private owner.
7 November	British Commerce	Merchantman	Messrs. Dobie & Co.	Govan	United Kingdom	For British Shipowners' Co.
7 November	Sibylla	Steamship	Messrs. Palmers	Jarrow-on-Tyne	United Kingdom	For Messrs. Fenwick & Sons.
8 November	Merlin	Schooner	John Banks	Kilpin Pike	United Kingdom	For William Cass.
9 November	Fulminate	Steamship	Messrs. John Elder & Co	Govan	United Kingdom	For Argentine Government.
10 November	Fiona	Steamship	Messrs. Cunliffe & Dunlop	Port Glasgow	United Kingdom	For Colonial Sugar Refinery Co.
12 November	Cherbourg	Steamship	Messrs. J. & G. Thomson	Dalmuir	United Kingdom	For Messrs. Burns & MacIver.
11 November	Esmeralda	Steamship	Messrs. Hall, Russell & Co.	Abredeen	United Kingdom	For Messrs. Peele, Hubble & Co.
14 November	Loch Eck	Merchantman	Messrs. Charles Connell & Co.	Scotstoun	United Kingdom	For Messrs. J. & R. Wilson.
19 November	Puigcerdá	monitor	Société Nouvelle des Forges et Chantiers de la Méditerranée	La Seyne	France	For Spanish Navy.
24 November	Palma	Steamship	Messrs. Edward Withy & Co.	Middleton	United Kingdom	For Messrs. Thomas Richardson & Sons.
25 November	Carmarthen Castle	Clipper	Messrs. R. & J. Evans & Co.	Liverpool	United Kingdom	For Messrs. Richards, Mills & Co.
25 November	Gellert	Steamship	Messrs. Alexander Stephen & Sons	Linthouse	United Kingdom	For Eagle Line.
25 November	Juno	Full-rigged ship	Bowdler, Chaffer & Co.	Seacombe	United Kingdom	For Joseph Steel & Son.
25 November	Killochan	Merchantman	Messrs. A. M'Millan & Son	Dumbarton	United Kingdom	For Messrs. John Kerr & Co.
25 November	Mexico	Sloop-of-war	Messrs. J. & G. Rennie	Greenwich	United Kingdom	For Mexican Navy.
26 November	Rio Grande do Sul	Steamship	Messrs. William Hamilton & Co.	Port Glasgow	United Kingdom	For Rio Grande do Sul Steamship Co.
30 November	Sindoro	Steamship	Caird & Company	Greenock	United Kingdom	For Stoomvaart Maatschappij Nederland.
November	Berenice	Pram	W. Allsup & Sons	Preston	United Kingdom	For J. Seed & Co.
November	Breeze	Steamship			United Kingdom	For Messrs. T. Appleby & Co.
November	Groningen	Steamship	Messrs. C. Mitchell & Co.	Low Walker	United Kingdom	For private owner.
November	Wallacetown	Merchantman	T. R. Oswald	Sunderland	United Kingdom	For Hargrove, Ferguson & Jackson.
5 December	Cape Sable	Merchantman	Messrs. T. Wingate & Co	Whiteinch	United Kingdom	For Messrs. Abram Lyle & Sons.
10 December	Caitloch	East Indiaman	Messrs. Robert Duncan & Co.	Port Glasgow	United Kingdom	For T. O. Hunter.
10 December	Flamingo	Steamship	Messrs. Barclay, Curle & Co.	Glasgow	United Kingdom	For Messrs. Seater, White & Co.
10 December	Stad Amsterdam	Steamship	Messrs. A. & J. Inglis	Pointhouse	United Kingdom	For Koninklijke Nederlandse Stoomboot-Maatschappij.
11 December	Khandalia	Steamship	Messrs. William Denny & Bros.	Dumbarton	United Kingdom	For British India Steam Navigation Company (Limited).
11 December	Swansea Castle	Barque	Messrs. M'Kellar, M'Millan & Co.	Dumbarton	United Kingdom	For Messrs. Jacobs. Bros.
12 December	Star of Russia	Sailing ship	Harland & Wolff	Belfast	United Kingdom	For J. P. Corry & Co.
21 December	Shuaydagone	Steamship	Messrs. Caird & Co.	Greenock	United Kingdom	For Burmah Steamship Co.
23 December	King Arthur	Steamship	Messrs. T. Turnbull & Sons	Whitby	United Kingdom	For Messrs. Turnbull, Sons & Co.
24 December	Bowen	Steamship	Messrs. John Reid & Co.	Port Glasgow	United Kingdom	For Eastern and Australian Mail Steamship Co.
24 December	Castle Roy	Merchantman	Messrs. John Elder & Co.	Govan	United Kingdom	For George Gilroy.
24 December	Dunnottar Castle	Merchantman	Messrs. James & George Thomson	Dalmuir	United Kingdom	For Castle Line.
25 December	Lake Champlain	Steamship	London & Glasgow Shipbuilding Co. Ltd	Glasgow	United Kingdom	For Canada Shipping Company.
25 December	Richard Trevithick	Steamship	Messrs. Cunliffe & Dunlop	Port Glasgow	United Kingdom	For Messrs. J. H. Trevithick & Sons.
29 December	Freya	Ariadne-class corvette	Kaiserliche Werft	Danzig	Germany	For Imperial German Navy.
December	Howard	Steamship	Barrow Ship Building Co. Ltd.	Barrow-in-Furness	United Kingdom	For James Little & Co.
Spring	Bloodhound	Cutter	Fife	Fairlie	United Kingdom	For Marquess of Ailsa.
Spring	Calcutta	Full-rigged ship		Quebec	Canada	For James Ross.
Spring	Laurentine	Barque		Quebec	Canada	For private owner.
Spring	Ossian	Barque		Quebec	Canada	For private owner.
Unknown date	A	Steamship	Thomas Brassey & Co.	Birkenhead	United Kingdom	For London and North Western Railway.
Unknown date	Abana	Barque		Saint John, New Brunswick	Canada	For private owner.
Unknown date	Adonis	Brigantine		Jervis Bay	New South Wales	For Patrick Hogan.
Unknown date	Advance	Schooner		Tolaga Bay	New Zealand	For Charles Ingstrom.
Unknown date	Agnes	Ketch		Sittingbourne	United Kingdom	For Shrubshall & Court.
Unknown date	Alexandra	Steamship	Osbourne, Graham & Co.	Sunderland	United Kingdom	For English & Scandinavian Steamship Co.
Unknown date	Alliance	Steamship	Henry Murray & Co.	Port Glasgow	United Kingdom	For private owner.
Unknown date	Amazonas	Steamship	Alfred Simey & Co.	Sunderland	United Kingdom	For Liverpool & Amazon Royal Mail Steamship Co.
Unknown date	Amelia & Jane	Schooner	Allix	Jersey	(United Kingdom of Great Britain and Ireland) Jersey	For William Walles.
Unknown date	Andes	Merchantman	Osbourne, Graham & Co.	Sunderland	United Kingdom	For Moran & Sanderson.
Unknown date	Antoinette	Barque		Yarmouth, Nova Scotia	Canada	For J Bingay.
Unknown date	Arizona	Merchantman	G. Short	Sunderland	United Kingdom	For Milburn Bros.
Unknown date	Aydon Forest	Merchantman	J. Gardner	Sunderland	United Kingdom	For J. S. Barwick.
Unknown date	Ayton	Merchantman	G. Short	Sunderland	United Kingdom	For J. S. Barwick.
Unknown date	B	Steamship	Thomas Brassey & Co.	Birkenhead	United Kingdom	For London and North Western Railway.
Unknown date	Barambio	Merchantman	Austin & Hunter	Sunderland	United Kingdom	For A di Ysasi.
Unknown date	Bear	Sealer	Alexander Stephen & Sons	Greenock	United Kingdom	For W. Grieve, Sons & Co.
Unknown date	Bermuda	Merchantman	William Doxford	Sunderland	United Kingdom	For Quebec & Gulf Ports Steamship Co.
Unknown date	Blyth	Steamship	Blumer & Co.	Sunderland	United Kingdom	For Blyth Shipping Co. Ltd.
Unknown date	C	Steamship	Thomas Brassey & Co.	Birkenhead	United Kingdom	For London and North Western Railway.
Unknown date	Campsie Glen	Merchantman	J. Gardner	Sunderland	United Kingdom	For W. Davison & Co.
Unknown date	Charlotte	Schooner	Philip Bellot	Gorey	(United Kingdom of Great Britain and Ireland) Jersey	For John Matthew Cantell.
Unknown date	Chittagong	Merchantman	W. Richardson	Sunderland	United Kingdom	For E. Walker.
Unknown date	Colstrup	Steamship	Messrs. Swan & Co.	Wallsend	United Kingdom	For Messrs. Almond Bros.
Unknown date	Contest	Forester-class gunboat	William Doxford & Sons Ltd.	Pallion	United Kingdom	For Royal Navy.
Unknown date	Coomassie	Merchantman	N. Gibbon	Sunderland	United Kingdom	For R. Forrest.
Unknown date	Cumberland	Barque	Bartram, Haswell & Co,	Sunderland	United Kingdom	For Pantland Hick & Co.
Unknown date	Cygnet	Forester-class gunboat	William Doxford & Sons Ltd.	Pallion	United Kingdom	For Royal Navy.
Unknown date	Cornelia B. Windiate	Schooner	Windiate & Butler	Manitowoc, Wisconsin	United States	For private owner.
Unknown date	Dacca	Barque	Blumer & Co.	Sunderland	United Kingdom	For J. B. Foley.
Unknown date	Dahlia	Lighthouse tender	Neafie & Levy	Philadelphia, Pennsylvania	United States	For United States Lighthouse Service.
Unknown date	Dallas	Dexter-class cutter	W. Fessenden	Portland, Maine	United Kingdom	For United States Revenue Cutter Service.
Unknown date	Daniel Steinmann	Steamer	Robert Duncan & Co	Antwerp	Belgium	For White Cross.
Unknown date	Duchess of Edinburgh	Clipper	Mounsey & Foster	Sunderland	United Kingdom	For E. T. Gourley & Co.
Unknown date	Dunalistair	Merchantman	Mounsey & Foster	Sunderland	United Kingdom	For W. S. Croudace & Co.
Unknown date	Eastern Monarch	Full-rigged ship	Mounsey & Foster	Sunderland	United Kingdom	For J. Patton Jr., & Co.
Unknown date	Elena	Steam yacht	Messrs. Henderson, Coulborn & Co.	Renfrew	United Kingdom	For private owner.
Unknown date	Emily McLaren	Merchantman	J. & J. Gibbon	Sunderland	United Kingdom	For Foulds & Bone.
Unknown date	Emma Crook	Merchantman	William Pickersgill	Sunderland	United Kingdom	For T. Seed.
Unknown date	Empress of China	Clipper		Padstow	United Kingdom	For private owner.
Unknown date	Enchantress	Barquentine	William Bayley & Sons	Ipswich	United Kingdom	For private owner.
Unknown date	Enid	Cutter	Mr. Chambers	Dumbarton	United Kingdom	For private owner.
Unknown date	Essex	Enterprise-class sloop	Donald McKay	Kitter Naval Yard	United States	For United States Navy.
Unknown date	Ethel Caine	Merchantman	Osbourne, Graham & Co.	Sunderland	United Kingdom	For N. Caine Jr.
Unknown date	Eugene F. Price	Fishing trawler			United States	For private owner.
Unknown date	Express	Forester-class gunboat	William Doxford & Sons Ltd.	Pallion	United Kingdom	For Royal Navy.
Unknown date	Fernglen	full-rigged ship	Blumer & Co	Sunderland	United Kingdom	For R. B. Porrett.
Unknown date	Flinders	Merchantman	James Laing	Sunderland	United Kingdom	For A. L. Elder.
Unknown date	Florence Margaret	Merchantman	William Pickersgill	Sunderland	United Kingdom	For T. Seed.
Unknown date	Florence Richards	Steamship	Joseph L. Thompson	Sunderland	United Kingdom	For S. Richards.
Unknown date	Formosa	Merchantman	James Laing	Sunderland	United Kingdom	For John Pile & Co.
Unknown date	Foyle	Full-rigged ship	T. R. Oswald	Sunderland	United Kingdom	For Nourse Line.
Unknown date	Free Lance	Steamship	Messrs. Raylton, Dixon & Co.	Middlesbrough	United Kingdom	For Messrs. C. O. Young & Co.
Unknown date	George S. Blake	Auxiliary schooner	E. J. Fardy	Baltimore, Maryland	United States	For United States Coast Survey.
Unknown date	George W. Elder	Cargo liner	John Roach & Sons	Chester, Pennsylvania	United States	For Old Dominion Steamship Company.
Unknown date	Gibraltar	Steam yacht	William Allsup	Preston	United Kingdom	For private owner.
Unknown date	Gladiator	Paddle tug	Thomas Brassey & Co.	Birkenhead	United Kingdom	For Edward Griffiths, John Griffiths and William Griffiths.
Unknown date	Glen Ville	Merchantman	J. & J. Gibbon	Sunderland	United Kingdom	For A. Meek & Co.
Unknown date	Gota	Cargo ship	Bergsund Mekaniske Verkstad	Stockholm	Sweden	For private owner.
Unknown date	Helena	Schooner	Quayle & Murphy	Cleveland, Ohio	United States	For private owner.
Unknown date	Hero	Paddle steamer		Echuca	Victoria	For private owner.
Unknown date	Hindostan	full-rigged ship	Blumer & Co	Sunderland	United Kingdom	For The New Zealand Shipping Co. Ltd.
Unknown date	Idomene	Merchantman	T. R. Oswald	Sunderland	United Kingdom	For H. Fernie & Co.
Unknown date	Ilala	Merchantman	Caledon Shipbuilding & Engineering Co. Ltd.	Dundee	United Kingdom	For private owner.
Unknown date	Imperatritsa Ekaterina II	Merchantman	Davison & Stokoe	Sunderland	United Kingdom	For Saint Petersburg Dampschiffsgesellschaft.
Unknown date	James	Mersey flat	John Anderton	Runcorn	United Kingdom	For private owner.
Unknown date	John Howard	Merchantman	Joseph L. Thompson	Sunderland	United Kingdom	For J. Marychurch & Co.
Unknown date	Juno	Steamship	Motala Verkstad	Norrköping	Sweden	For private owner.
Unknown date	King Arthur	Steamship	Messrs. Scott & Co.	Inverkeithing	United Kingdom	For private owner.
Unknown date	Kirch	Schooner	Bartram, Haswell & Co	Sunderland	United Kingdom	For W. Wilkie & Co.
Unknown date	Knight Templar	Merchantman	Austin & Hunter	Sunderland	United Kingdom	For E. Shotton & Co.
Unknown date	Lanercost	Merchantman	N. Gibbon	Sunderland	United Kingdom	For G. Watson.
Unknown date	Linguist	Full-rigged ship	Mounsey & Foster	Sunderland	United Kingdom	For T. & J. Harrison.
Unknown date	Lykus	Merchantman	Joseph L. Thompson	Sunderland	United Kingdom	For A. Smith & Co.
Unknown date	Marie Lorentzen	Merchantman	G. Short	Sunderland	United Kingdom	For J. H. Lorentzen & Co.
Unknown date	Martha and Lizzie	Fishing vessel	David Banks & Co.	Plymouth	United Kingdom	For William Thompson.
Unknown date	Mary Frost	Merchantman	N. Gibbon	Sunderland	United Kingdom	For H. Barber.
Unknown date	McArthur	Survey ship	Mare Island Navy Yard	Vallejo, California	United States	For United States Coast Survey.
Unknown date	Min	Steamship	Rober Thompson Jr.	Sunderland	United Kingdom	For A. R. Brown.
Unknown date	Minerva	Steamship	William Gray & Company	West Hartlepool	United Kingdom	For private owner.
Unknown date	Moonlight	Schooner	Wolf and Davidson Co.		United States	For William Mack.
Unknown date	Muriel	Merchantman	James Laing	Sunderland	United Kingdom	For J. Laing.
Unknown date	Nancy Holt	Merchantman	J. & J. Gibbon	Sunderland	United Kingdom	For private owner.
Unknown date	Nautilus	Merchantman	George S. Gulston	Sunderland	United Kingdom	For General Steam Navigation Co. Ltd.
Unknown date	Number One	Steamship	Thomas Brassey & Co.	Birkenhead	United Kingdom	For Mersey Docks and Harbour Board.
Unknown date	Olive	Barque	William Pile	Sunderland	United Kingdom	For Henry Ellis.
Unknown date	Otter	Sternwheeler	Fred Congdon	Portland, Oregon	United States	For Fred Congdon.
Unknown date	Our Annie	Merchantman	Richard Thompson	Sunderland	United Kingdom	For G. L. Seed.
Unknown date	Pioneer	Fishing vessel	David Banks & Co.	Plymouth	United Kingdom	For Preston & Fleetwood Fishery Co. Ltd.
Unknown date	Postboy	Schooner		Port Adelaide	(United Kingdom of Great Britain and Ireland) South Australia	For Wenman & Morgan.
Unknown date	Promise	Fishing trawler	John Barter & Son	Brixham	United Kingdom	For John Dugdall and others.
Unknown date	Pym	Barque	J. Crown	Sunderland	United Kingdom	For W. R. Abbay.
Unknown date	Queen of the Bay	Paddle steamer	William Allsup	Preston	United Kingdom	For Blackpool, Lytham & Southport Steam Packet Co. Ltd.
Unknown date	Rayner	Merchantman	Robert Thompson Jr.	Sunderland	United Kingdom	For Stephens & Co.
Unknown date	Reliance	Paddle tug	James Beeching	Great Yarmouth	United Kingdom	For William Fothergill.
Unknown date	Remus	Merchantman	Joseph L. Thompson	Sunderland	United Kingdom	For Culliford & Clark.
Unknown date	Renpor	Steamship	Short Brothers	Sunderland	United Kingdom	For R. Ropner.
Unknown date	Respigadera	Merchantman	T. R. Oswald	Sunderland	United Kingdom	For Hargrove, Ferguson & Jackson.
Unknown date	Rodney	Barque	William Pile	Sunderland	United Kingdom	For Devitt & Moore.
Unknown date	Rose	Tug	Robert Bretland, or Bretland & Angel	Liverpool	United Kingdom	For Thomas Miller.
Unknown date	Runcorn	Tug	Bridgewater Trustees, or Bridgewater Navigation Company	Runcorn	United Kingdom	For private owner.
Unknown date	Saint Lawrence	Merchantman	James Laing	Sunderland	United Kingdom	For Temperley & Co.
Unknown date	Sarah and Mary	Merchantman	D. A. Douglas	Sunderland	United Kingdom	For Tyzack & Branfoot.
Unknown date	Senator	Merchantman	Mounsey & Foster	Sunderland	United Kingdom	For Charente Steamship Co. Ltd.
Unknown date	Silksworth	Merchantman	G. Short	Sunderland	United Kingdom	For J. O. Clazey.
Unknown date	Silver Cloud	Schooner	Richard Thompson	Sunderland	United Kingdom	For Maunsell & Co.
Unknown date	Sindoro	Steamship	Caird & Company	Greenock	United Kingdom	For Stoomvaart Maatschappij Nederland.
Unknown date	Stag	Merchantman	Bartram, Haswell & Co.	Sunderland	United Kingdom	For Joseph Robinson.
Unknown date	Sumida	Merchantman	Robert Thompson Jr.	Sunderland	United Kingdom	For Imperial Japanese Government.
Unknown date	Swallow	Merchantman	W. Richardson	Sunderland	United Kingdom	For T. Gallop.
Unknown date	S. W. Kelly	Merchantman	Joseph L. Thompson	Sunderland	United Kingdom	For J. Marychurch & Co.
Unknown date	Teaser	Sternwheeler		The Dalles, Oregon	United States	For Oregon Steam Navigation Company.
Unknown date	Theseus	Merchantman	Robert Thompson Jr.	Sunderland	United Kingdom	For Livingston & Briggs.
Unknown date	Tonga	Merchantman	N. Gibbon	Sunderland	United Kingdom	For Bullard, King & Co.
Unknown date	Transvaal	Barque	J. Crown	Sunderland	United Kingdom	For Rennie Line.
Unknown date	Truth	Merchantman	J. Gardner	Sunderland	United Kingdom	For Eills & Co.
Unknown date	Violet	Merchantman	J. & J. Gibbobn	Sunderland	United Kingdom	For E. Gardner.
Unknown date	Waikato	Full-rigged ship	Blumer & Co	Sunderland	United Kingdom	For The New Zealand Shipping Co. Ltd.
Unknown date	Waimate	Merchantman	Blumer & Co	Sunderland	United Kingdom	For The New Zealand Shipping Co. Ltd.
Unknown date	Waitangi	Full-rigged ship	Blumer & Co	Sunderland	United Kingdom	For The New Zealand Shipping Co. Ltd.
Unknown date	Wanderer	Schooner		Garmouth	United Kingdom	For David Reid.
Unknown date	Warrior	Merchantman	Davison & Stokoe	Sunderland	United Kingdom	For T. & J. Harrison.
Unknown date	William D. Seed	Merchantman	William Pickersgill	Sunderland	United Kingdom	For T. Seed.
Unknown date	Zeeburg	Merchantman	J. Gill	Sunderland	United Kingdom	For D. & A. D. McLaren.
