= Otter (sternwheeler) =

19th-century river steamboat in the northwestern United States

- Otter in a shipyard on Puget Sound, unknown date.

History
- Name: Otter
- Route: Puget Sound, Columbia River, Lake Washington, Stikine River
- In service: 1874
- Out of service: 1897
- Identification: US registry #19407
- Fate: Abandoned 1897

General characteristics
- Type: inland steamboat
- Length: 87 ft (26.52 m)
- Beam: 18 ft (5.49 m)
- Depth: 6 ft (1.83 m) depth of hold
- Installed power: twin steam engines (from steamer Mary Belle), horizontally mounted; cylinder bores 14 in (35.6 cm); stroke 30 in (76.2 cm) 13 indicated horsepower.
- Propulsion: sternwheel

Otter was a wooden sternwheel steamboat that was used in Puget Sound and briefly on the Columbia and Stikine rivers from 1874 to 1897.

== Columbia River service ==
Otter was built in Portland, Oregon, in 1874 by Fred Congdon. Congdon reused the machinery that had previously been installed in the Mary Belle, which he had dismantled and traded to G.W. Hume for use as a wharf. Congdon made the trial trip of the Otter on March 28, 1874. He intended to run the Otter on the lower Columbia River, in connection with business allies who had built the Teaser to run on the middle Columbia, above the Cascades Rapids.

Although both Otter and Teaser were both too small to be very competitive, this plan still was perceived by the Oregon Steam Navigation Company to be threat to the monopoly which they were seeking to maintain on Columbia River transportation, and so they purchased both Otter and Teaser, and arranged to have them sent to Puget Sound in 1875.

== Transfer to Puget Sound ==
On Puget Sound, Otter was first used to tow barges for the Renton Coal Company, and was later run by the Starr brothers in the upper sound in opposition to the steamers Zephyr and Messenger. In 1877, the Starrs accepted a monthly payment of $500 to refrain from competing with Zephyr and Messenger, and the vessel was as a result reassigned to the run between Olympia and Tacoma, Washington. In 1881, the Oregon Railway and Navigation Company, under Henry Villard bought out the Starr Line and all their steamers including Otter.

Otter is reported to have been worked for one season on the Stikine River in British Columbia. Otter was used as a trading steamer until February 1890, when the vessel was involved in a collision in Puget Sound off Des Moines with the sternwheeler Hassalo.

Otter sustained substantial damage but was successfully beached with no lives lost. Otter was owned at the time of the collision by Captain T. Cook of Tacoma. Repairs were made however, and Otter was returned to service until 1897, when it was abandoned on the Puyallup River.
