= Annie Gulvin =

English gardener at Kew

Annie M Gulvin
- Born: Mary Ann Gulvin; 18 June 1876
- Died: 1972 (aged 95–96)
- Occupation: Gardener
- Known for: One of the first two women gardeners at the Royal Botanic Gardens, Kew

Annie M Gulvin (18 June 1876 - 1972) was one of the first two women gardeners at the Royal Botanic Gardens, Kew.

== Early life and education ==
Annie Gulvin was born Mary Ann Gulvin in 1876, the daughter of Charles Gulvin, a police constable, and Mary Ann Hooker. She was one of the first female students at the previously all-male Swanley Horticultural College, and graduated top of her class. The Royal Horticultural Society published rankings of its examinees, and in 1895 Gulvin placed first and won their Silver Gilt Medal.

== Career ==
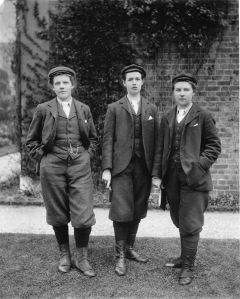
Eleanor Morland, Gertude Cope and Alice Hutchins, colleagues of Annie Gulvin at the Royal Botanic Gardens, Kew.

In January 1896 Gulvin was appointed, with Alice Hutchins, by William Thiselton-Dyer, then Director of the Royal Botanic Gardens as the first women gardeners at Kew.

Gulvin and Hutchins were then joined by Gertrude Cope and Eleanor Morland. The women were employed on equal pay, and were made to wear the same brown woolen uniform as male gardeners, so as not to distract their male colleagues. However, due to the publicity this caused, skirts were then reinstated.

After a year working at Kew, Gulvin moved to the estate of Iscoed in Carmarthenshire, Wales in 1897 as head gardener. In 1899 Gulvin became head gardener in Burstall, Suffolk.

== Personal life ==
Gulvin married Alan Turner, a solicitor, in 1900, and ceased to practise as a gardener. She had a son and daughter, and died in 1972, aged 95.
