= Listed buildings in Burstall, Suffolk =

Civil Parish in Suffolk, England

Burstall is a village and civil parish in the Babergh District of Suffolk, England. It contains seven listed buildings that are recorded in the National Heritage List for England. Of these one is grade I and six are grade II.

This list is based on the information retrieved online from Historic England.

== Key ==
Grade	Criteria
I	Buildings that are of exceptional interest
II*	Particularly important buildings of more than special interest
II	Buildings that are of special interest

== Listing ==
Name	Grade	Location	Type	Completed (Note: The date given is the date used by Historic England as significant for the initial building or that of an important part in the structure's description.)	Date designated	Grid ref. (Note: The grid reference is based on the British national grid reference system, sometimes known as OSGB36, used by the Ordnance Survey.) Geo-coordinates	Notes	Entry number (Note: The "List Entry Number" is a unique number assigned to each listed building and scheduled monument by Historic England.)	Image	Wikidata
Fenn Farmhouse	II	Hadleigh Road			29 January 1988	TM1068143744; 52°03′07″N 1°04′17″E		1351617	Upload Photo	Q26634703
Burstall Hill Cottages	II	1 and 2, The Street			29 January 1988	TM0878345381; 52°04′03″N 1°02′41″E		1036950	Upload Photo	Q26288623
Barn at White House Farm	II	The Street			29 January 1988	TM0989044523; 52°03′34″N 1°03′37″E		1351618	Upload Photo	Q26634704
Canes Farmhouse	II	The Street			29 January 1988	TM0916445344; 52°04′01″N 1°03′01″E		1036949	Upload Photo	Q26288622
Church of St Mary	I	The Street	church building		22 February 1955	TM0971644579; 52°03′36″N 1°03′28″E		1036948	Church of St Mary More images	Q17541815
Half Moon	II	The Street			22 February 1955	TM0956644715; 52°03′40″N 1°03′20″E		1351619	Upload Photo	Q26634705
Mulberry Hall	II	The Street	building		22 February 1955	TM0993844506; 52°03′33″N 1°03′39″E		1036947	Mulberry Hall More images	Q26288621

== See also ==
- Grade I listed buildings in Suffolk
- Grade II* listed buildings in Suffolk

== Sources ==
- Bettely, James; Pevsner, Nikolaus (2015) [1961], Suffolk: West, The Buildings of England, New Haven and London: Yale University Press, ISBN 978-0-300-19655-9
