= Alice Hutchins (gardener) =

English gardener (1870–1944)

- Hutchins in 1898 at Kew
- Died: January 24, 1944; England
- Other names: Mrs. W. H. Patterson
- Education: Swanley Horticultural College
- Employer: Royal Botanic Gardens, Kew
- Spouse: William Henry Patterson

Alice Hutchins (c. 1870 – 24 January 1944) was one of the two first women gardeners hired at Kew Gardens in 1896.

== Education ==
Hutchins trained at the Horticultural College for Women at Swanley in Kent after it began accepting women in 1891. Her studies were funded by a Kent County Council Scholarship. She received a College Diploma after the two-year program.

== Kew Gardens ==
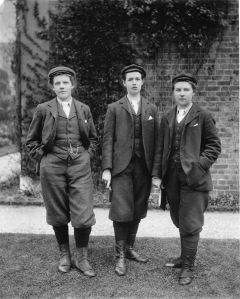
Hutchins (right) with Eleanor Morland (left) and Gertude Cope at the Royal Botanic Gardens, Kew in 1898 wearing their bloomer uniforms.

In 1896, she and Annie Gulvin were the first women hired by Director William Thiselton-Dyer at Kew Gardens as "improvers". They received the same salary as male staff. They initially wore the same uniforms as the male garden staff to ensure order and consistency. These bloomers drew media attention and criticism, so they were swapped for skirts.

Hutchins worked long hours and performed physical tasks in addition to studying chemistry, botany and horticulture in the evenings. By 1897, she had been promoted to gardener and was responsible for certain houses and frames in the garden. She received top marks in systematic and economic botany courses. She delivered a lecture on horticulture for women which included information about courses at Swanley and emphasising the importance of scientific knowledge. However, the discussion was centred around the perceived lesser physical capabilities of women and the resulting lesser salaries.

In 1898, Hutchins was promoted to sub-foreman in the Alpine Pits section of the garden. By 1902, she and the other women gardeners had left Kew, likely for roles as head gardeners in other institutions. There were no women in the role again until the First World War. Hutchins herself worked as gardener for a Mrs. Cranfield near Ipswich, and later as Head Gardener at Burstall in Suffolk.

== Marriage and travel ==
In 1902, Hutchins married William Henry Patterson, who she met at Swanley and worked with at Kew. He was appointed to a government Agricultural School position at St. Vincent a year later, and she went with him. They moved to the African Gold Coast in 1912 where Patterson became an entomologist. Hutchins went on regular field expeditions with her husband. The couple remained in Uganda after his retirement in 1930, working at a C.M.S. Mission School. Patterson received an M.B.E. in 1925. They remained involved in the Kew Guild even when they lived in Africa, Patterson serving as a Committee member and Hutchins attending yearly dinner events in London when she was nearby.

Hutchins died suddenly in 1944 while visiting her daughter in England. Her husband was still in Uganda and she would have returned to meet him there after the Second World War.

She is sometimes mistakenly named as "Alice Hutchings", but documents from the Kew Guild contemporary to her time there list her as Alice Hutchins. Later commentary by those who possibly knew her by her married name may be the cause of confusion.
