= Frances Micklethwait =

Research chemist

Frances Mary Gore Micklethwait
- Born: 1867; Blackwood, Yorkshire, England
- Died: 25 March 1950 (aged 82–83)
- Education: Royal college of science, later known as Imperial College
- Awards: MBE for secret wartime work
- Scientific career
- Fields: Wartime research chemist

Frances Mary Gore Micklethwait (1867 – 25 March 1950) was an English research chemist, among the first to study and seek an antidote to mustard gas during the First World War. She received an MBE for her top secret wartime work in chemical warfare, which has since come to light.

== Early life and education ==
Micklethwait was born in Blackwood, Yorkshire, the first daughter of a Yorkshire farmer and a Parisian mother. Biographies generally give 1868 as her year of birth, but this is disputed by official records. She was educated privately and then studied at the Swanley Horticultural College in Kent, which admitted women from 1897, when she was 30 years old.^{[1]} In 1898 Micklethwait joined the Royal College of Science (later Imperial College) and attained her degree, the Associateship of the Royal College of Science, in 1901.^{[1]}

== Pre-war research at the Royal College of Science (now Imperial College) ==
After obtaining her degree, Micklethwait 'carried out a substantial and varied series of researches' in the field of organic chemistry, a relatively new area of science that would be of major global importance.^{[1]} From 1901 to 1912 she worked mainly with Gilbert Thomas Morgan, during which she received a Beit Research Fellowship for the excellence of her work. With Morgan, Micklethwait co-authored 22 research papers and became one of the most prolific female authors of chemistry publications of her time.

== Wartime research ==
Officially, Frances Micklethwait's MBE was for her work as an 'Experimental Chemical Supply Officer, Trench Warfare Department, Ministry of Munitions.' But the true value of her research was in chemical warfare: "[o]fficial secrecy has obscured the wartime activities of the chemist Frances Micklethwait, who... joined a research team at Imperial College investigating chemical weapons during the War. She was among the first to study mustard gas, a particularly pernicious chemical because, unlike chlorine, it is invisible and its effects are not immediately noticeable". A colleague later recalled noticing her and her fellow workers "popping into the corridor every now and again to see how the experimental blisters on their arms were getting on. ... Micklethwait was decorated after the War, but because the work was top-secret, its significance has only recently begun to be appreciated." At Imperial, Micklethwait worked alongside Martha Annie Whiteley, one of the inventors of tear gas.

== Post-war research ==
Micklethwait worked briefly for the Boots Pure Drug Co. and then returned to Swanley Horticultural College in 1921, becoming its Principal in 1922. She also worked on the Index for the revised edition of Thorpe's Dictionary of Applied Chemistry.

== Associations ==
- 1920 – Fellow of the Royal Society of Chemistry.
