= William Turner Thiselton-Dyer =

British botanist (1843–1928)

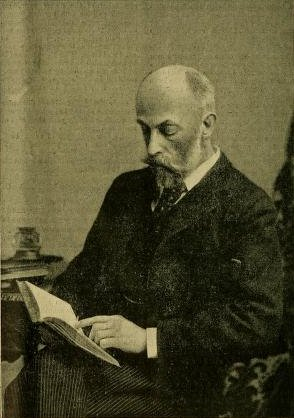
William Turner Thiselton-Dyer (The Gardeners' Chronicle 1899)

Sir William Turner Thiselton-Dyer KCMG CIE FRS FLS (28 July 1843 – 23 December 1928) was a leading British botanist, and the third director of the Royal Botanic Gardens, Kew. The standard author abbreviation Dyer is used to indicate this person as the author when citing a botanical name.

== Life and career ==
Thiselton-Dyer was born in Westminster, London. He was a son of William George Thiselton-Dyer (1812–1868), physician and Catherine Jane, née Firminger (1815–1897), botanist. He was educated at King's College School where he was first mathematical scholar, and later proceeded to the medical department of King's College London, where he remained until 1863 when he proceeded to Christ Church, Oxford. Initially studying mathematics at Christ Church, Oxford, he graduated in natural science in 1867. He became Professor of Natural History at the Royal Agricultural College in Cirencester and then Professor of Botany at the Royal College of Science for Ireland in Dublin. In 1872, he became professor at the Royal Horticultural Society in London, being recommended by Joseph Dalton Hooker. During the summers from 1872 to 1876, Thiselton-Dyer assisted T. H. Huxley in South Kensington with Huxley's summer courses for teachers.

In 1875, Thiselton-Dyer was appointed assistant director at the Royal Botanic Gardens, Kew, under Hooker, where he was to stay for thirty years. Thiselton-Dyer spent considerable time working for the benefit of the British colonies. He introduced rubber plantations to Sri Lanka and Malaya, and introduced cacao from Trinidad to plantations in Sri Lanka. In 1877, he was given charge of Jodrell Laboratory. This international research laboratory, established at Kew with private funding, became known as one of the best laboratories in Europe. Thiselton-Dyer also designed a new rock garden, after a bequest to Kew in 1881 of a large collection of Alpine plants. At Jodrell Laboratory, he was a mentor to Dunkinfield Henry Scott and H. Marshall Ward.

Thiselton-Dyer was elected FRS in 1880. His proposers included Charles Darwin and George Bentham, but not Joseph Dalton Hooker, whose daughter Dyer had already married. From 1885 to 1905, after the retirement of Hooker, he was director of the Royal Botanic Gardens.

As Director, in 1896 Dyer appointed the first women gardeners at Kew, Annie Gulvin and Alice Hutchins.

Thiselton-Dyer was a fellow of the University of London from 1887 to 1890, Royal Commissioner to the Paris International Exhibition (1900) and to the St. Louis Exposition (1904), botanical adviser to the Secretary of State for the Colonies (1902–1906), and became a member of the court of the University of Bristol in 1909. His principal works are an English edition of Sachs Text-Book of Botany (1875), editions of the Flora Capensis and of the Flora of Tropical Africa, and Index Kewensis (1905). With his former school-friend Henry Trimen he published The Flora of Middlesex (1869).

He married the botanical illustrator Harriet Anne Hooker, daughter of Joseph Dalton Hooker, in 1877; they had one son and one daughter. Harriet Anne Dyer (née Hooker) lived at Kew from birth until old age, surviving her husband and dying in 1946 aged 91, in her house near Bere Alston. Thiselton-Dyer was appointed KCMG in 1899, and awarded the Clarke Medal by the Royal Society of New South Wales in 1892, the same year he was awarded honorary membership of the Manchester Literary and Philosophical Society. He was elected to the American Philosophical Society in 1905. He died at The Ferns (now Crickley Court), Witcombe, a village near Gloucester, and is buried in the churchyard of St Peter's, Bentham.

Awards
Preceded by Frederick Hutton	Clarke Medal; 1892	Succeeded by Ralph Tate
