= Swanley Horticultural College =

Former women's horticultural college in Kent, England

Swanley Horticultural College, founded in 1889 (137 years ago), was a college of horticulture in Hextable, Kent, England. It originally took only male students but by 1894 the majority of students were female and it became a women-only institution in 1903.

== Early history ==
The college was registered as The Horticultural College and Produce Company, Limited on 30 January 1889. Businessman Arthur Harper Bond (1853–1940) described how he had wished to "do something in the way of applying scientific principles to fruit-growing" and met a man who offered "his" property at Swanley as its base. Bond occupied the property to set up "the Horticultural College", but it later transpired that the property belonged to naval architect and politician Edward Reed. Bond bought it from Reed as "the only way to extricate myself from a difficult position and save my pet scheme from extinction". The college's lecture theatre was the saloon designed by Reed for SS Bessemer, which had been built to swing on gimbals in an attempt to relieve sea-sickness at the request of Henry Bessemer: Reed had installed it as a billiards room adjacent to the main house. The objectives stated in the initial company memorandum of association included "the training of pupils in agriculture and horticulture, and in all matters connected with the cultivation and utilization of land for horticultural farming, grazing, gardening or other purposes either at home or abroad".

Within the college's first month a woman had enquired about admission, but the college did not initially admit women. Alderman Emma Cons and her friend Ethel Gertrude Everest spent a few weeks in 1890 working at the college alongside the male students to demonstrate that women could cope with the physical labour, and in May 1891 Cons called a meeting in London at the Women's London Gardening Association's premises, at which the prospectus for the "Ladies' Branch" (later the "Women's Branch") of the college was drawn up. A residential hostel for women students, "South Bank" in Swanley run by Elizabeth Watson, opened in 1891, and the first female student, Mrs Benison, joined the college on 13 June 1891. By 1896 there were more female students than male, and in 1902 the board agreed to restrict admission to women students only: the last male student finished his studies in 1903.

== College history ==
The first woman principal was Fanny Wilkinson from 1904 to 1916 and 1921 to 1922. Two of the college's first graduates, Annie Gulvin and Alice Hutchins became the first women gardeners at Royal Botanic Gardens, Kew. Later graduates were Brenda Colvin and Sylvia Crowe. Frances Micklethwait was Principal at Swanley in 1922, where she had once been a student. She had previously been a chemist at University College, London.

In 1939 with the outbreak of war the college and its students were evacuated to Sutton Bonington in Nottinghamshire, then the premises of the Midlands Agricultural and Dairy College, but they returned to Swanley in September 1942. The college was hit by Luftwaffe bombs on 1 March 1944, causing considerable damage to Hextable House.

== Merger and current use ==
In 1945 the college was merged with South Eastern Agricultural College, and as Wye College became part of the University of London, finally closing in 2009. The Kent Horticultural Institute was established at Hextable in 1949 and later merged with the Kent Farming Institute to form Hadlow College, established in 1968, which traces its origins back to include Swanley.

The college's botany laboratory building is now used as a local heritage centre, and the gardens form a public park.
