= Mary Belle =

Mary Belle, or variants, is a given name.

== People with the given name ==
Notable people with the name include:

- Mary Belle Allen (1922–1973), American pioneer of biochemical microbiology
- Belle Brezing (Mary Belle Cox, 1860–1940), American prostitute and brothel madam
- Mary Belle de Vargas (1902–1946), American artist
- Mary Belle Grossman (1879–1977), American suffragist, attorney, and judge
- Mary Belle Harris (1874–1957), American prison administrator and reformer
- MaryBelle Johns Nissly (1918–1999), American conductor and music educator
- Belle Delphine (Mary-Belle Kirschner, born 1999), South African-born British media personality and pornographic actress
- Mary Belle McElwain (1874–1964), American classical scholar

== Fictional characters ==
- Marybelle Portsnell, in The Poe Clan manga series

== See also ==
- Mary (name)
