= Gilbert Thomas Morgan =

Sir Gilbert Thomas Morgan (1872-1940), OBE, FRS, was a British research chemist.

== Career ==
After graduating from Finsbury Technical College, where he had studied under Raphael Meldola, Morgan was employed as assistant chemist at the dye firm Read Holliday & Co. In 1894 he enrolled at the Royal College of Science to further his education, where he joined the staff and worked closely with Frances Micklethwait. In 1912 he became professor of chemistry at the Royal College of Science for Ireland, leaving in 1915 to work briefly for British Dyes. In 1916 he became professor of chemistry at Finsbury Technical College, and in 1919 at Birmingham University. In 1925 he became the first director of the Chemical Research Laboratory at the Government Research Laboratory, Teddington.

== Honours and awards ==
- Fellow of the Royal Society (1915)
- OBE (1920)
- knighthood (1936)
