= SS Bessemer =

British paddle steamer

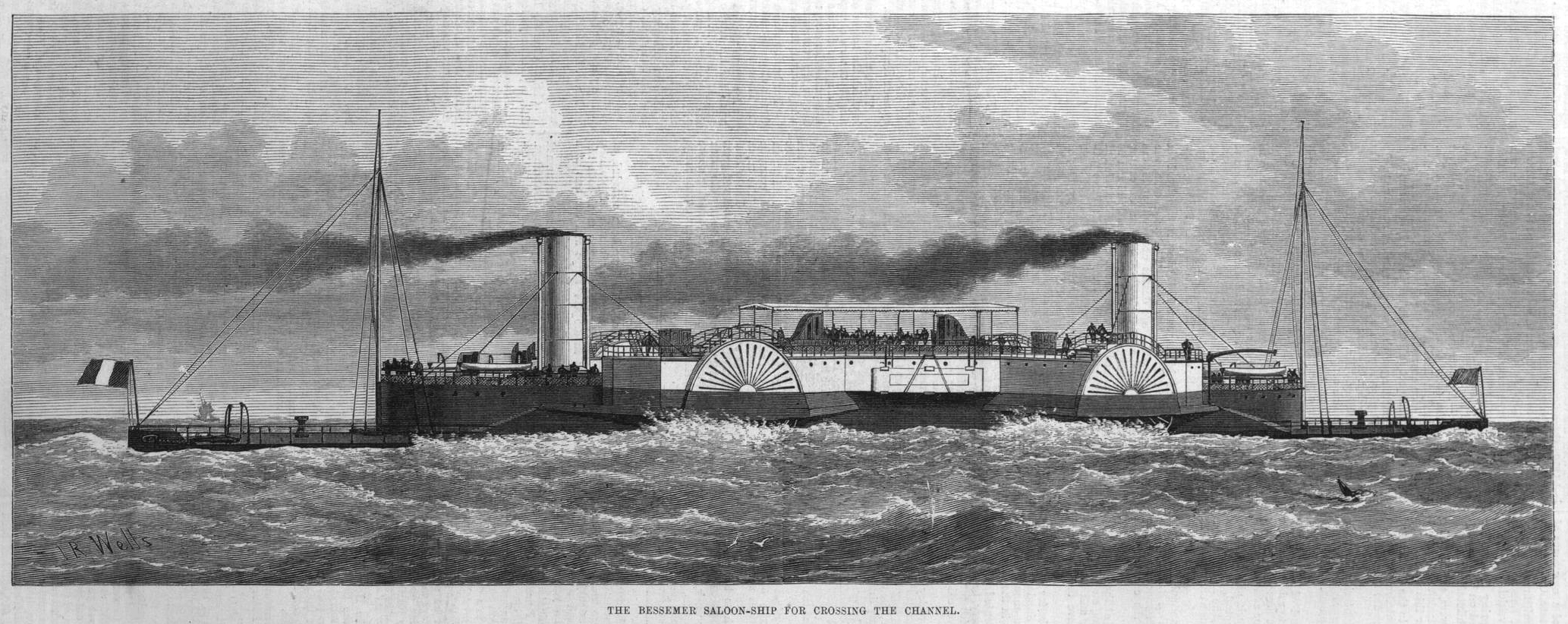
- The Bessemer Saloon-Steamer, Illustrated London News, 1875

History
- Name: Bessemer
- Owner: Bessemer Steamship Co Ltd
- Port of registry: (United Kingdom)
- Builder: Earle's Shipbuilding, Hull
- Yard number: 197
- Launched: 24 September 1874
- Completed: April 1875
- Maiden voyage: April 1875
- Out of service: May 1875
- Identification: United Kingdom Official Number 70698
- Fate: Scrapped 1879

General characteristics
- Type: Passenger ferry
- Tonnage: 1,974 GRT
- Length: 350 ft (106.68 m)
- Beam: 40 ft (12.19 m) (deck); 65 ft (19.81 m) (overall)
- Draught: 7 ft 5 in (2.26 m)
- Propulsion: 4 paddle wheels

The SS Bessemer (also called the Bessemer Saloon) was an experimental Victorian cross-channel passenger paddle steamer with a swinging cabin, a concept devised by the engineer and inventor Sir Henry Bessemer, intended to combat seasickness.

== Background ==
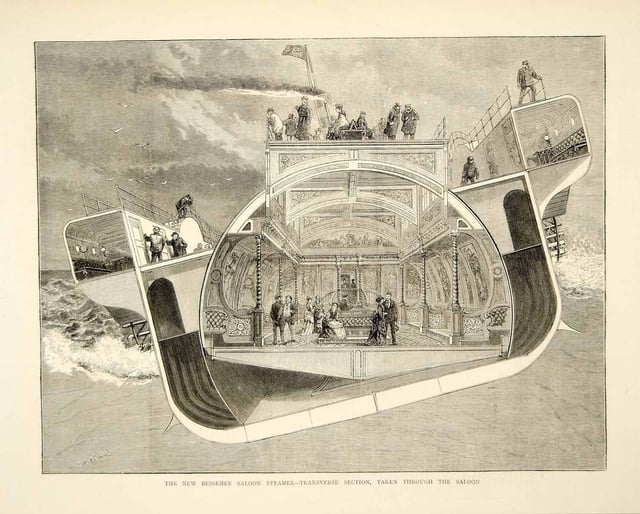
The New Bessemer Saloon Steamer, transverse section, taken through the Saloon - The Graphic, 1874

Bessemer, a severe seasickness sufferer, devised in 1868 the idea of a ship whose passenger cabin - the Saloon - would be suspended on gimbals and kept horizontal mechanically to isolate the occupants from the ship's motion: an idea he patented in December 1869. After successful trials with a model, the levelling achieved by hydraulics controlled by a steersman watching a spirit level, Bessemer set up a limited joint stock company, the Bessemer Saloon Steamboat Company Limited, to run steamships between England and France. This gained £250,000 capital, financing the construction of a ship, the SS Bessemer, with the naval constructor Edward James Reed as chief designer.

== Construction ==
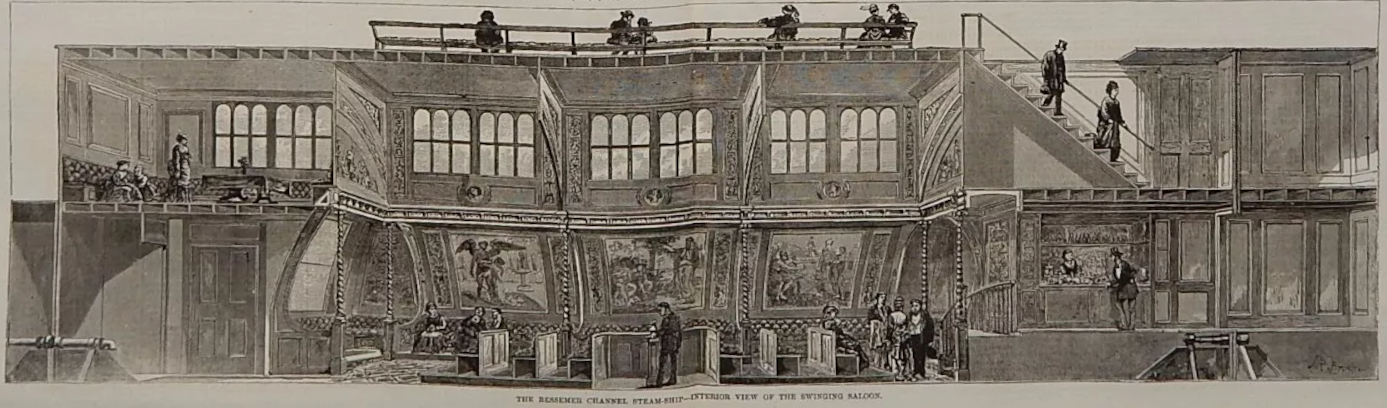
interior view of the swinging saloon, longitudinal section, showing interior of saloon, ladies' private cabin, and stairs leading to promenade deck.

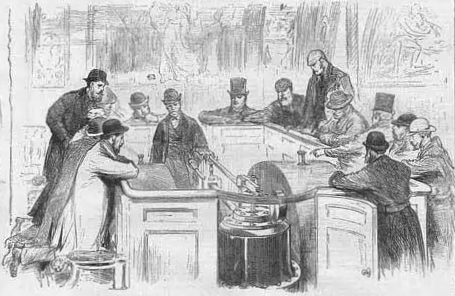
Interior of saloon and oscillating machinery. The Graphic, 1875

Bessemer was a 4-paddle steamer (2 paddles each on port and starboard, one fore, one aft), length 350 feet (106.68 m), breadth at deck beam 40 feet (12.19 m), outside breadth across paddle-boxes, 65 feet (19.81 m), draught 7 feet 5 inches (2.26 m), gross register tonnage 1974 tons. The internal Saloon was a room 70 ft (21 m) long by 30 ft (9.1 m) wide, with a ceiling 20 feet (6.1 m) from the floor, Morocco-covered seats, divisions and spiral columns of carved oak, and gilt moulded panels with hand-painted murals. Bessemer was built by Earle's Shipbuilding of Hull. She was yard number 197 and was launched on 24 September 1874.

== Career ==
On 21 October 1874, she was driven ashore at Hull in a gale. She was refloated and found to be undamaged.

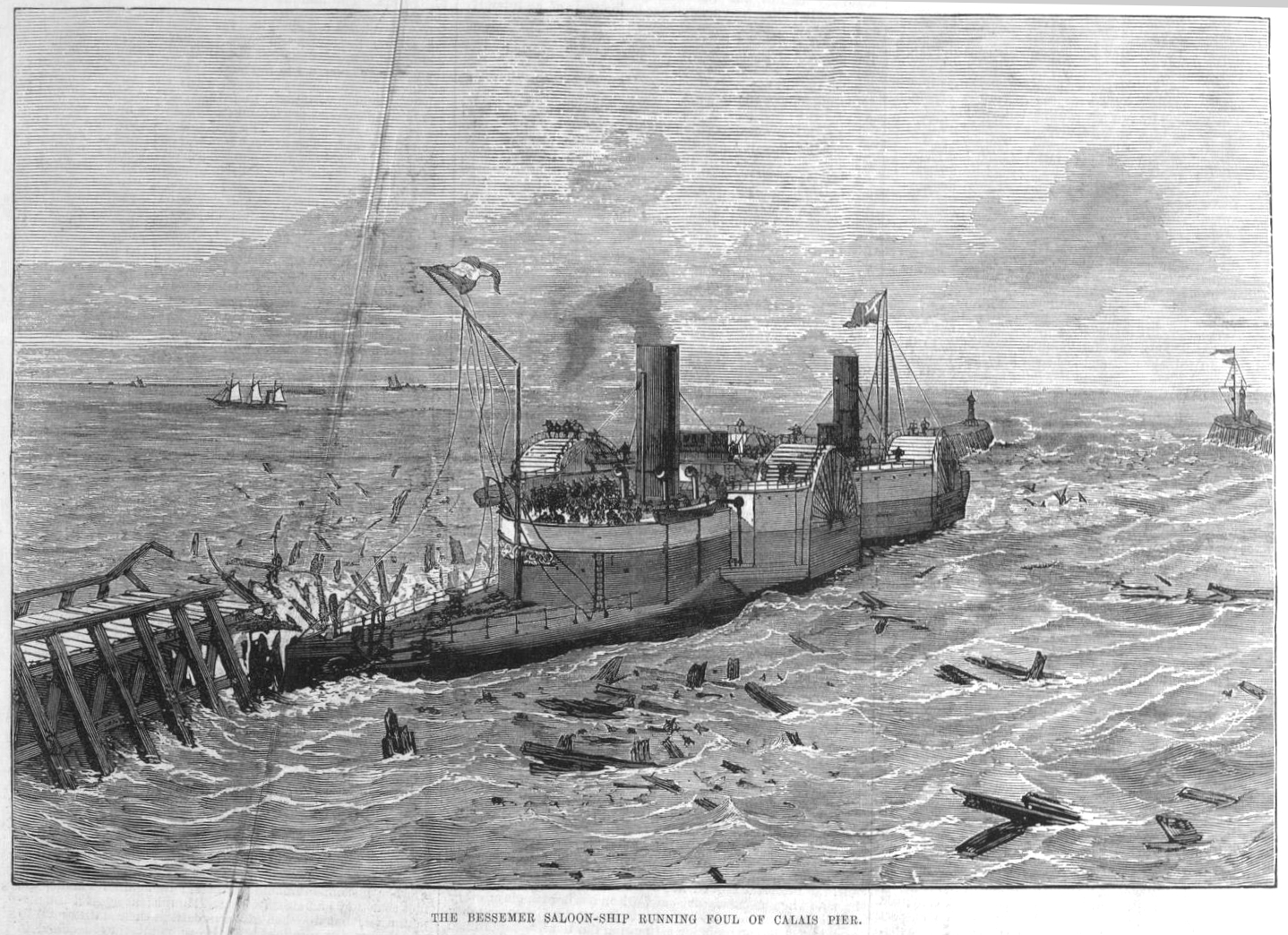
The Bessemer Saloon-Ship running foul of Calais Pier. Illustrated London News, 1875

The ship sailed from Dover to Calais on a private trial in April 1875. On arrival, it sustained damage to a paddle-wheel when it hit the pier at Calais, due to its failure to answer to the helm at slow speed. The first and only public voyage took place on 8 May 1875, the ship sailing with the swinging cabin locked (some observers suggested due to its serious instability, although Bessemer ascribed it to insufficient time to fix the previous damage). The ship was operated by the London, Chatham and Dover Railway. After two attempts to enter the harbour, she crashed into the Calais pier again, this time demolishing part of it.

The poor performance lost the confidence of investors, leading to the winding-up of the Company in 1876. On 29 December 1876, following the removal of the swinging saloon and other extensive alterations, Bessemer ran aground on the Burcom Sand, in the Humber upstream of Grimsby, Lincolnshire. She was refloated and taken in to Hull. The Board of Trade enquiry into the grounding found her captain at fault. His certificate was suspended for three months. The ship was subsequently docked at Dover until being sold for scrap in 1879.

Following its removal, designer Reed had the Saloon cabin moved to his home, Hextable House, Swanley, where it was used as a billiard room. When the house later became a women's college, Swanley Horticultural College, the Saloon was used as a lecture hall, but was destroyed by a direct hit when the college was bombed in World War II.

The sole remaining parts of the ship are three carved wooden decorative panels from the saloon that were rescued from the wreckage after the bombing. One panel was valued on the Antiques Roadshow at between £300 - 400 in 2012.
