= Teaser (sternwheeler) =

Steamboat

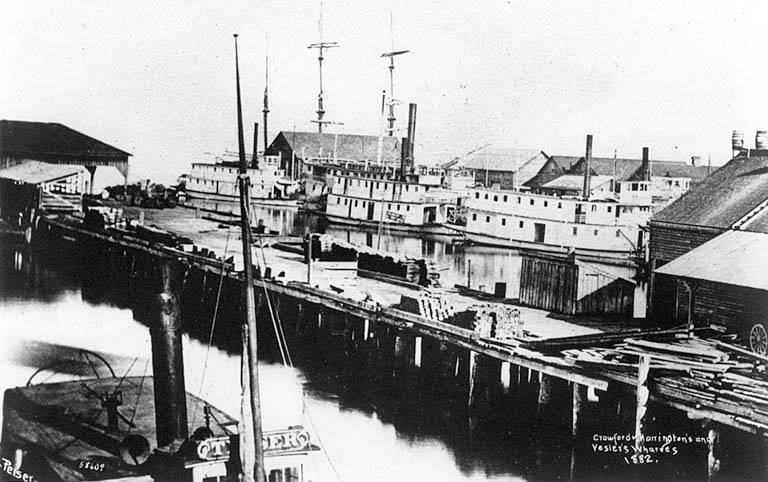
- Teaser, lower left, at Yesler Wharf circa 1877.

History
- Name: Teaser
- Completed: 1874
- Out of service: 1879
- Fate: Sank 1879, raised, converted to schooner 1880.
- Notes: Career as schooner unknown

General characteristics
- Type: inland steamboat (1874–1880); sailing vessel (post 1880)
- Tonnage: 33.27 regist.
- Length: 69 ft (21.03 m)
- Beam: 13 ft (3.96 m)
- Depth: 8 ft (2.44 m) depth of hold
- Installed power: (1874–1880): twin steam engines, horizontally mounted; cylinder bores 8 in (20.3 cm); stroke 18 in (45.7 cm)
- Propulsion: (1874–1880) sternwheeler
- Sail plan: Schooner (post 1880)

Teaser was a steamboat which ran on the Columbia River and Puget Sound from 1874 to 1880.

== Columbia River service ==
Teaser was built in 1874 at The Dalles, Oregon, and was intended to run on the middle Columbia river, which was the stretch of navigable river that ran between the Cascades Rapids and Celilo Falls. At that time, all traffic proceeding upriver had to be offloaded onto a portage railroad that went around the impassable Cascades, then run upriver by rail to the Upper Cascades to be loaded onto another steamer to be carried to The Dalles, where another portage railroad existed around Celilo Falls. The reverse had to be followed for downriver traffic.

In the 1870s, the Oregon Steam Navigation Company had a monopoly on all traffic on the Columbia River. Teaser was launched as a boat to run in opposition to the monopoly, to make connections over the portage at the Cascades with the newly constructed Otter, running on the lower river. Both Teaser and Otter were too small to mount a serious challenge to the powerful Oregon Steam Navigation Co., but to prevent any competition, the monopoly bought both vessels just the same, and both vessels were sent to Puget Sound.

== Operations on Puget Sound ==
Transfer of Teaser to Puget Sound meant the vessel had to be taken through the dangerous Cascade Rapids. While this could be done in the right conditions with a skillful pilot, it was considered too risky to have any passengers or cargo on board. Teaser was taken down through the Cascades in 1875 under the command of Capt. J.W. Brazee, with engineer James Carroll and the fireman on board as crew. The vessel was brought around the Olympic Peninsula and arrived at Seattle on July 8, 1875, and was placed on a route out of Snohomish. Capt J. C. Brittain is reported to have owned Teaser when the vessel was on Puget Sound, and used the vessel in connection with the steamers Despatch and Comet to carry the mail, for which he had a contract, to Snohomish, La Conner, Whidbey Island, Fidalgo Island, Bellingham Bay, Semiahmoo Bay, and Lopez, Orcas and San Juan islands.

== Sinking and conversion to sailing vessel ==
Teaser is reported to have sunk in an unspecified location in 1879. The vessel was raised and converted into a sailing schooner in 1880.
