= Messenger (sternwheeler) =

- Messenger in 1888.

History
- Name: Messenger
- Route: Puget Sound
- Completed: 1876
- Fate: Destroyed by fire 1907

General characteristics
- Length: 91 ft (27.7 m)
- Installed power: steam engines
- Propulsion: sternwheel

Messenger was a sternwheel steamboat of the Puget Sound Mosquito Fleet.

== Career ==
Messenger was built in 1876 at Tumwater, Washington. The vessel had separate cabins for men and women, and worked in the south Puget Sound area, sometimes in competition with Zephyr. Messenger was destroyed by fire in 1907 while docked at Tacoma.
