= USLHT Dahlia =

Coordinates: 41°54′28″N 87°35′6″W

History

United States
- Name: USLHT Dahlia
- Namesake: Dahlia
- Builder: Neafie & Levy
- Launched: 1874
- Fate: Sold into commercial service, 5 May 1909; Wrecked, 11 March 1912

General characteristics
- Type: Lighthouse tender
- Tonnage: 623 long tons (633 t) gross; 353 long tons (359 t) net
- Length: 129 ft 5 in (39.45 m)
- Beam: 25 ft (7.6 m)
- Draft: 10 ft 5 in (3.18 m)
- Propulsion: Steeple compound engine, 1 screw
- Armament: None

The United States Lighthouse Tender Dahlia was a lighthouse tender serving on the Great Lakes.

The first Great Lakes tender to be specifically built for that purpose, she was built in 1874 by Neafie & Levy and placed into commission at Detroit, Michigan. The ship was refitted in 1881, and again in 1891.

On 5 November 1907 while docked at Milwaukee she was struck by Christopher receiving $450 in damage. On 5 May 1909 she was sold to E. W. Seymour, of Chicago, and rebuilt as passenger and freight carrier, and rechristened Flora M. Hill on 12 May 1910, under which name she served as a ferry between Chicago and Green Bay. The ship became stuck in heavy ice on 11 March 1912, while attempting to enter Chicago Harbor; after her passengers were unloaded, she was allowed to sink to the bottom, where her remains were seen as a shipping hazard and dynamited.

== See also ==
- Seeing The Light: US Lighthouse Tender Dahlia
