= Cornelia B. Windiate =

Schooner that sank in 1875 near Alpena, Michigan,

Coordinates: 45°19.552′N 83°19.599′W

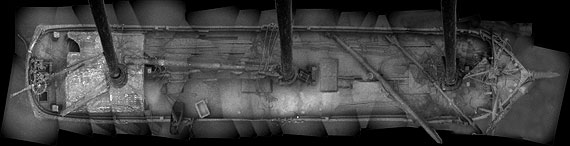
- Image of the wreck

History
- Name: Cornelia B. Windiate
- Builder: Windiate & Butler, Manitowoc
- Laid down: 1874
- Fate: Sank 1875

General characteristics
- Tonnage: 322

Cornelia B. Windiate was a schooner that sank in 1875 with all hands in Lake Huron off Presque Isle, Michigan, between Rogers City and Alpena. The ship was eastbound from Milwaukee to Buffalo. The reason for her sinking is unknown, but she departed November 27, late in the season, and was overloaded with grain. She carried a crew of nine and was loaded with about 21,000 bushels of wheat, roughly 5,000 bushels more than her rated capacity of 16,000 bushels. There was no record of her passing through the Straits of Mackinac, so for years it was assumed she had foundered somewhere in Lake Michigan.

In 1986 the Cornelia B. Windiate was discovered by divers, at a depth of 185 feet (56 m), in Lake Huron, near Alpena, Michigan, farther east than expected. The wreck is unique in that her cargo is still secure in her holds which is quite unusual for a wreck. Her masts are still standing with rigging.

== See also ==
- List of shipwrecks in the Thunder Bay National Marine Sanctuary
