= Merksworth (1874) =

Australian steamboat (1874–1898)

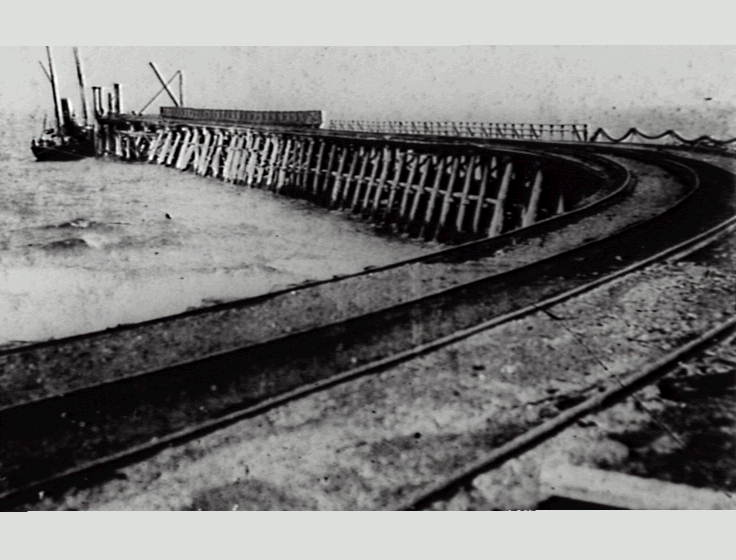
- The Merksworth at Bulli Jetty

History
- Name: Merksworth
- Port of registry: Sydney
- Ship registration number: 51/1876
- Ship official number: 70852
- Builder: John Fullerton & Company Paisley, Clyde, Scotland
- Launched: 18 May 1874
- Completed: 1874
- Fate: Wrecked 7 May 1898

General characteristics
- Type: Iron Steamer screw
- Tonnage: 270 GRT; 165 NRT
- Length: 44.16 m
- Beam: 6.766 m
- Draught: 3.535 m
- Installed power: Compound
- Crew: 12

The Merksworth was an iron steamer screw built in 1874 at, Paisley, that was wrecked when it swamped whilst carrying coal between Newcastle and Sydney and was lost off Stockton Beach on 7 May 1898.

== Ship description and construction ==
The Merksworth was an iron collier built by John Fullerton & Company at Paisley on the River Clyde in Scotland.

== Service history ==
=== Arrival in Australia ===
When the vessel arrived in Australia for service in the Hunter Valley coal fields for the Anvil Creek Coal mine at Morpeth upstream of Newcastle the vessel and journey was described as

THE Merksworth, -A most valuable addition has been made to the colonial steam fleet by the safe arrival of the steam collier Merksworth, which has been purchased in England by Mr. Jeffrey, specially for the Anvil Creek Coal mining Company. This vessel was built at Paisley, on the Clyde, by Messrs. Fullerton and Co., and measures 165 tons register, carrying 420 tons coal under hatches, on a draught of only ten feet. This was the most important item in the instructions of the directors in sending for a vessel that could convey or bring from Morpeth, on the Hunter River, a large cargo on a given draught, and they have been most fortunate in securing a suitable craft in so short a time. In appearance the new steamer is a very fine wholesome vessel, having good ends, with a moderately flat floor. She is reported an excellent sea boat, and her outward passage speaks for itself with respect to her speed. The engines, which are on the compound surface condensing principle, are of 45 horse power, they are exceedingly strong but are so compact that they appear lost in the well ventilated and spacious engine room, but, although small in appearance, they are most effective, and can with ease drive the ship ten knots on the small consumption of 3 1/2 tons per day She left England with 336 tons of coal, and has now on board about 40 tons, and has been under steam seventy eight day. These facts speak for themselves, and show that the Merksworth is all that could be desired. She is supplied with two steam winches worked by a small donkey engine, which is placed in one corner of the stokehole, and she can work three hatch ways at once.

The cabin accommodation, necessarily only on a limited scale, but quite sufficient for the requirements of her officers. The machinery is in perfect working order, and, with the exception of cleaning the hull, the vessel is ready to commence work at once. With reaped to her passage, we learn that she left Cardiff on December 2, steaming for the Cape of Good Hope. The Equator was crossed at. Longitude 10' W, and she carried along S E. track to TableY E«y, which was reached on the 12th January. Having watered, etc, she left again on the 18th January, and ran down her easting on a parallel between latitude 39° and 42° S, with moderate winds and weather, passing the meridian of Cape Otway on 21st instant. She has been under steam the whole voyage, which has been accomplished in 85 days (from pilot to pilot).

=== Career for the Anvil Creek Company Colliery at Morpeth February 1875 to July 1876 ===
The vessel started trading between the Hunter Coal Fields and Sydney with her first trip from Morpeth described

In a late issue we stated that the berth at the Queen's Wharf, Morpeth, was being prepared for the reception of steam colliers. On Sunday night the Merksworth, the first of these, arrived at Morpeth, and commenced to load Anvil Creek coal on Monday morning at six o'clock. She cleared for Newcastle in the evening with 284 tons on board. The Merksworth, we are informed, belongs to the Anvil Creek company

The vessel had several hardships during a passage from Wollongong to Melbourne

The steamer Merksworth, which arrived at Melbourne yesterday, from Wollongong, had a protracted passage, and during it the vessel was more than once in anything but a pleasant position for those who were on board. She left Wollongong on the 12th, and on the 14th a tremendous gale set in attended with a high cross sea, in which she laboured heavily, and shipped a great deal of water.

A fearful sea struck the steamer till half-past 8 a.m., and brought it and the ventilators down on the deck. The steam-whistle also got damaged, and the steam escaped out of the boilers. The vessel then became unmanageable, and large bodies of water got down through the flue and ventilators to the stoke-hole. At 4 p.m. Captain Owen managed to get the vessel before the sea, and with the valuable assistance Mr. Miller, the chief engineer, the cover of the steam heater was placed over the flue, and one of the ventilators was used as a funnel. By 6 a.m. steam enough was obtained to enable the Merksworth to get into Twofold Bay where she anchored at 4 pm. on the 14th, and left again on the 15th, rounding Cape Howe at 9 p.m. on that day. At 2 a.m.

On the 17th another muzzier in the shape of a hard south-west gale was encountered, and, there being a high sea on, great quantities of water were shipped, and little or no headway was made. At 8 a.m. Captain Owen bore up for shelter under the Howe, and rounded the Cape at 2 p.m. but as the weather then abated he again made for Melbourne. At 6 p.m., however, the weather broke out with increased fury, and in consequence of the strong head wind and sea, and the air-pump being out of order, the steamer put back, to Twofold Bay, and anchored there at 2 p.m.

After repairing the pump another start was made at 3 a.m. on the 18th, and fine weather prevailed until 1pm. on the 18th, when a heavy gale from the NW sprung up off Wilsons Promontory, and at 5pm. the. Merksworth put into Waterloo Bay, where she sheltered. Until 7 pm and then resumed her passage, cleared the fines and made every preparation for hard steaming. Port Phillip heads were entered at 1p.m. on Tuesday

The vessel was then sold to the Bulli company for £11,500 in July 1876

=== Career for the Bulli Coal Company July 1876 to March 1893 ===
The Merksworth then mainly moved Coal from Bulli through to Sydney often in partnership with the Woniora In December 1878 the vessel and its crew became involved in industrial action

The Seamen's Union Committee report that the seamen and firemen of the Bulli Coal Co.'s steamers Woniora and Merksworth struck work yesterday, in consequence of the Company's hulk being taken alongside the A. S. N. Co.'s steamer Wentworth, with the intention of supplying that vessel with coal. It was also rumoured, last night that the crew of the steamer Havilah had left that vessel, because she had been taken alongside the A. S. N. Co.'s steamer Brisbane. The Woniora left Sydney for Bulli yesterday with a Chinese crew.

In Early October 1880 the vessel became involved in the rescue of the steam launch Lightning (35 ft. long, and between 6 ft. and 7 ft. beam ) the Lightning had been purchased from Georges River, Botany Bay, for service on the River Derwent in Tasmania and when the Lightning was leaving Botany Bay the vessel was abandoned. The Lightning was then later picked up by the Merksworth off Botany Heads, and towed back into the Bay and then later towed the Lightning to Sydney to claim large salvage.

A Day after this incident the steam collier Merksworth ran onto the South Reef in Port Jackson at night, and received some damage causing the vessel to be beached at Watsons Bay, and then refloated and towed into dock for repairs.

During March 1881 the ship steward, James McKellar was taken to the Infirmary suffering from injuries to his head, received through falling down the after-hold. After the accident McKellar did not appear to be much injured, but the next day as the vessel was about to go to sea, the master deemed it advisable to have him removed as he was considered as very dull in his manner.

During December 1882 William Miller, the master of the vessel pleaded guilty, and was fined £5 and costs for failing to stretch a tarpaulin so as to prevent the coal from falling into the harbour between the vessel and the Potosi from which coal was being loaded.

Just 7 months later the Master William Miller was again having legal issues as he was summoned by John Hammar a former crew member. Miller received a fine of 10s, and 27s 6d costs, for not supplied the former crew member with a proper discharge thus preventing him from shipping on another vessel

In January 1887 a large strike began to take hold in the Illawarra coal mines and the vessel was used to convoy workers from Sydney to help break the strike at the mine

Fill out more info on the Illawarra coal strike

In April 1887 the Merksworth was involved with a slight Collision with the Illawarra at Robertson Basin when

The Illawarra was lying at her usual berth, loading for Sydney, and with a good number of passengers and friends were on board, when the Merksworth, in ballast, entered, the basin. Whether the engines were not stopped in time or the vessel failed to answer her helm is not known, but the Merksworth instead, of slowing forged slowly ahead and struck the Illawarra on the forward sponson, which was crushed and caused a dent in one or two plates. The Merksworth was moving so slowly that it was thought that she would come to a standstill before approaching the Illawarra, but she had just enough way on to cause the damage described. Had the impetus been a little more the Illawarra would have been crippled.

The Merksworth was placed up for auction in February 1889 but was passed in. As the vessel failed to sell the Bulli Coal Company sent the vessel in to be refurbished:

Both engines and hull have been carefully examined and thoroughly repaired. She has also been fitted with a new steel boiler 10ft 3in in diameter and 9ft 6in long. It weighs 15 tons, and was tested by the Government engineer to 140 lb per square inch. The whole of the work, including the construction of the boiler, has been carried out by Messrs Grant Brothers, of Pyrmont, in the most creditable manner. The Merksworth was taken for the usual official trial, under steam yesterday, and resulted in attaining an average speed of 9 1/2 knots with 70 lb steam 25" vacuum, the engines doing 80 revolutions. Mr Hamilton, the company's manager, and Mr Pollock, the superintending engineer, warmly complimented Messrs Grant on the efficiency of the work done and Mr Cruickshank also ex pressed himself as being highly satisfied. The ship is now (both in hull and machinery) in good seagoing order.

During this refit a boilermaker named Thomas Harrison, aged 21 years, residing in Wentworth Park-road, Glebe, was working at the side of the steamer, cutting rivets, when a piece of iron flew off and destroyed the sight of his left eye.

In January 1893 whilst delivering Coal to Nouméa the Merksworth picked up the crew of the Peerless which had becalmed on 4 January, 9 miles (14 km) outside the reef and the current then sent the Peerless onto the reef, and after doing everything possible to save her, the crew of the Peerless took the boats.

The Merksworth was sold as part of the liquidation of the Bulli Coal Company in March 1893

=== Career March 1893 to its sinking ===
On 29 June 1896 The iron collier Merksworth collided with Pyrmont Bridge in Sydney and sustained considerable damage.

She had discharged part of her coal cargo, and was endeavouring to go through the swing bridge when, owing to being light right at the stern, through the discharge of coal from the after hold, she became unmanageable and crashed into the bridge. The forward part of the steamer was badly damaged and the whole fore compartment was flooded. But for the forward bulkhead, which prevented the water getting into the hold, the vessel would have foundered. As it was she had to be berthed, and the remainder of her cargo is now being discharged.

==== 1896 collision with the Ferry Manly ====
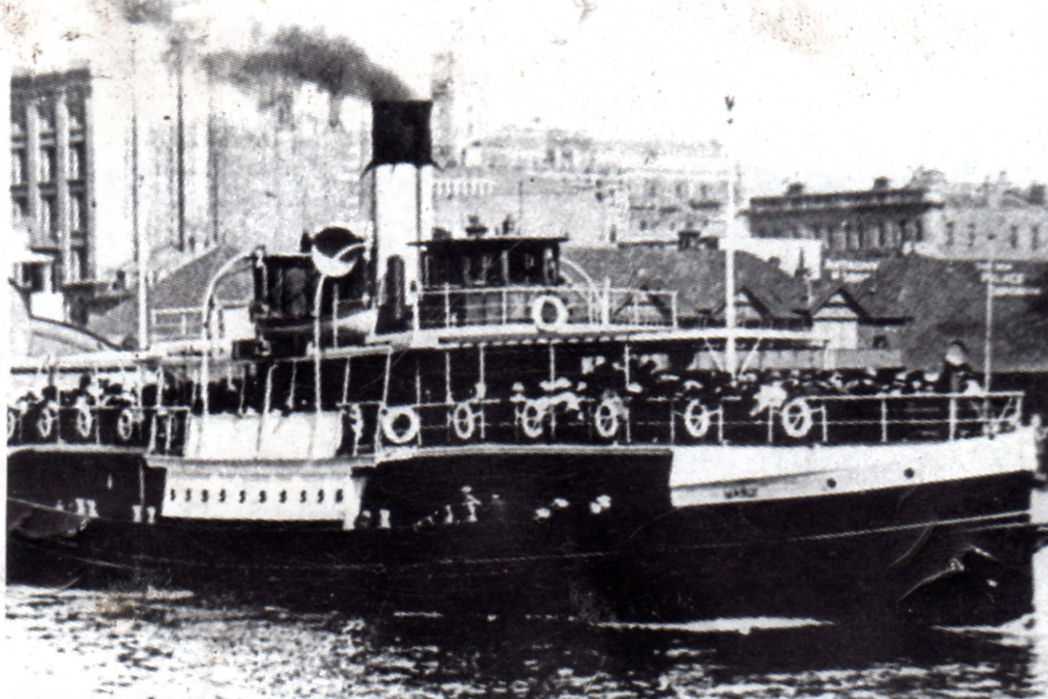
The Steamship Manly II that collided with the Merksworth

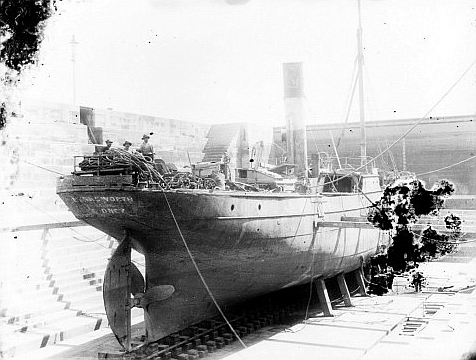
The collier Merksworth collided with the steamer Manly in Sydney Harbour on 23 December 1896 image of the vessel undergoing repairs in Fitzroy dry dock

Friday 18 December 1896, The Ferry Manly struck a sliding blow with the collier Merksworth which commenced to promptly start sinking

Between 1 and 2 pm yesterday the steam collier Merksworth, bound from the Wallarah Coal Company’s mine, laden with coal, was heading up the harbour making a course for Miller's Point or somewhere about there, where she usually gets orders as to what wharf or ship she is to discharge her cargo at, when she met with a disastrous collision. She had rounded Bradleys Head, and was making an inside course to pass Pinchgut. Following her came the Manly Beach Company's new steamer Manly, one of the fastest ferry steamers in the harbour, and soon after passing Bradley's these two steamers, presumably under complete control, came so close that the one hit the other what is technically known as a "sliding blow" That graceful act proved sufficient for the struck ship to almost immediately sink, and cause an almost miraculous escape of her crew. It would, in the absence of the official reports and the official inquiry which the Marine Board must hold, be improper to speculate as to which ship was the offender.

The fact remains that the well-found steam collier the Merksworth received such injury as ended her career for the time being in her particular sphere of usefulness. The accounts given by some of those who were aboard the Merksworth differ in minor details, though they are unanimous in that they were ahead until the nose of the Manly was poked into the midship part of their ship, smashing the bridge and some of the upper works It came as a surprise, and after realising that they had been struck nobody suggested that the blow was serious until the hissing caused by the inrush of water below into the boiler room was heard, and it came in quickly, for before the Merksworth could reach Kirribilli Point she was doomed, and the best that could be done was done under the circumstances, namely, head her for the nearest land and jam her head there, thus saving risking the lives of the men The other steamer, Manly, was by that time well up tho harbour on her way to the Manly wharf “They hit us on our starboard side," said one of the crew of the Merksworth, “and we didn't think there was much in it, but she has a projecting propeller head, and that must have rammed us underneath" And that is the accepted theory of the cause of the sinking of the Merksworth

All were silent on the ferry-boat when official reports were asked for, but the passengers were less disposed to be reticent "The thing was all done in a moment," said one " There was some whistling and singing out, but the hit was not a loud one, and we really thought the other boat was but little damaged Imagine when, after arriving in the city, we heard that the collier had sunk We had no idea of such a. thing As to who was in the right or the wrong I should be sorry to say Naturally we were a bit scared, and there was some excitement, but nothing very, sensational " On being seen by a reporter, the master of the Manly declined to make a statement

The steamer Merksworth lies a little to the westward of the entrance to Mosman Bay Her stem is sticking a few feet above water on rock The stern is in eight fathoms on a sandy bottom A foot or so of her mizzenmast was visible yesterday afternoon, and a little more of the foremast, but the top of her funnel was at least 15ft under water A lot of boats were out in the evening to inspect the place in which the steamer sank, and, judging from the rugged formation of that part of the harbour, the idea forces itself on one's mind that it was a case of "touch and go," of beaching or sinking in deep water

The water police were quickly on the scene Inspector Hyem, in reply to an inquiry, said " It was lucky there were no lives lost We brought ashore eight of the crew, the captain and four others remained by the wreck The men brought their baggage, and they saved the Merksworth cat, s which seemed to have been a sort of pet on board” The Manly, the new Steamer which originally was built for the now Co-operative Company and the name changed subsequent.) from Emancipator to Manly, was so little damaged that she continued her timetable service throughout the remainder of the day at the company 's office it was stated that tile damage would he covered by £5 The steam collier Merksworth was once a crack steamer on this coast carrying mails and passengers. like many other well-built ships, when she became a bit old her place was taken by younger, larger, and more imposing steamers she was launched at Paisley, Scotland, 22 years ago, an iron steamer of 270 tons, 10 horsepower nominal, and is now owned by the Wallarah Coal Company

The prime policy on the Merksworth is held by the South British Insurance Company, with re insurances

The vessel was then salvage over the next 6 weeks with some 300 tons of coal have been recovered from the ship's holds, by divers sending up the coal from the after part and grab buckets being used for the fore hold. Three lifting slings were placed under the steamer by Captains Banks and Colonna the vessel was refloated and taken to the Sutherland Dock.

Captain T. A. Capurn, of the harbour steamer Manly, had his certificate suspended for three months owing to the collision with the collier Merkswerth in the harbor.

== Shipwreck event ==
Maitland Gale Sinking, named after another (passenger) ship wrecked by the same storm, with loss of more than 20 lives. Add more information

== Wreck site and wreckage ==
The pilot steamer left from Newcastle and course took a N.E. half N. course, and when abreast of the spot where the Adderley was wrecked only last year the Merksworth was sighted drifting steadily but surely towards the fatal beach.

The Vessel Founders - A few moments later, whilst those on board the pilot steamer were debating the best course to pursue, the Merksworth foundered. Suddenly she shipped one of those big green seas, and it was evident that she was doomed. The breakers dashed furiously over the stern, she gave a heavy lurch, and sank stern first. For a moment she assumed an almost upright position, only her bows being visible, and then she completely disappeared from sight into 10 fathoms of water. The Merksworth foundered in less than a minute after shipping the seas. Although it was very evident that the collier had been abandoned it was deemed prudent to make assurance doubly sure, and the lifeboat was towed in a circle round the scene of the disaster with a view to rescuing anyone who might perchance be aboard. A strict lookout was kept on all sides, but no one rose to the surface.

Scene of the Disaster. The spot where the Merksworth founded was about 10 miles in a northerly direction from Nobbys, and about one and a quarter mile from the beach—almost abreast of the scene of the wreck of the Adderley. Had she continued to drift for half an hour longer she would have gone ashore on that portion of Stockton Beach between the scenes of the wrecks of the Adderley and Fitzroy (1897)32°48′12″S 152°03′30″E. Notwithstanding the rough weather the Galatea only occupied 1¼ hour in reaching the scene, and the time at which the collier foundered is given as 10.15 a.m.

The Adderley was variously described as ashore at either on Stockton Beach, about 15 miles (24 km) from Newcastle or had the vessel proceeded 6 miles (9.7 km) further north she would have struck the rocks at Morna Point

Coincidentally The Mareeba 32°50′30.8″S 151°53′03.5″E also came ashore 11 year later close to the scene to where the barque Adderley was driven ashore, The Mareeba bound to Sydney, was towed past the very spot and then came to grief.

== Post-sinking ==
Just 12 weeks after the sinking of the vessel and the death of Robert McIndoe his wife gave birth to a daughter at her residence, 37 Merriman street, Miller's Point on 11 August 1898

While in September 1952 the sole survivor of the ship died

He was Mr. Johan Simon Johanson, 82. He leaves a son and daughter. The storm caused 40 deaths, 29 of them among the crew and passengers of the steamer Maitland, and 11 of the Merksworth's company. Many other small steamers and sailing ships were wrecked, blown ashore, or swept hundreds of miles off their courses.

Mr. Johanson drifted in a lifeboat with other members of the crew for 24 hours after they abandoned ship. Exposure and exhaustion killed most. Mr. Johanson was cast ashore on Stockton Beach with two other seamen, both of whom died soon afterwards

== See also ==
- Sixty-miler

Books

Specific to the sinking

- Destination Never Reached New South Wales Shipwrecks by Max Gleeson 2004 ISBN 0-9751178-0-7 pages 115-123
