= Zephyr (steamboat) =

1871 steamboat in United States

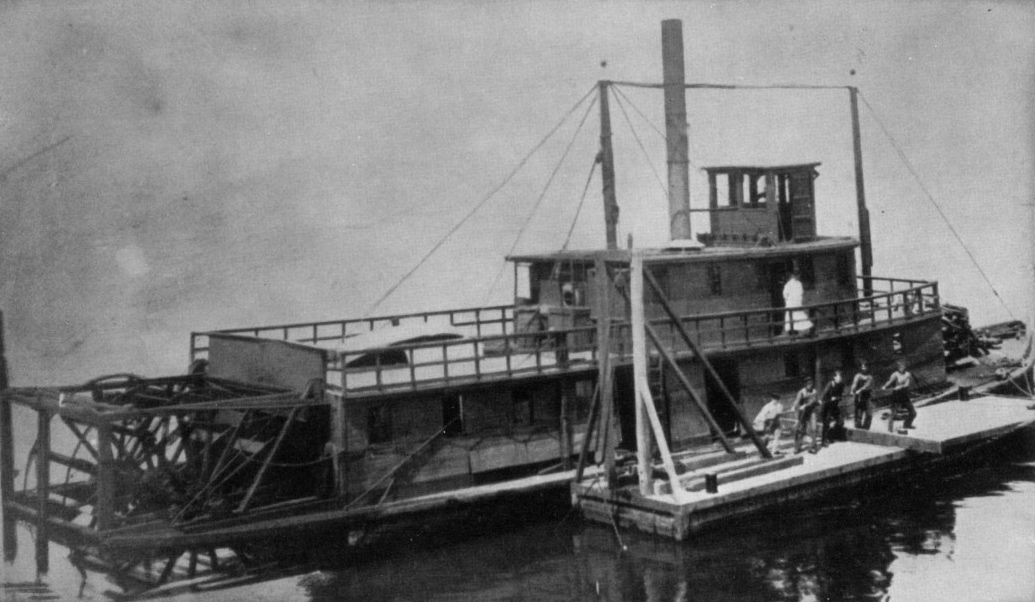
- Zephyr and work crew alongside on float

History
- Name: Zephyr
- Route: Puget Sound
- Completed: 1871
- Out of service: 1907
- Fate: Sold for scrap 1907

General characteristics
- Installed power: steam engines
- Propulsion: sternwheel

Zephyr was a sternwheel steamboat of the Puget Sound Mosquito Fleet.

== Career ==
Zephyr was built in 1871 for the famous steamboat captain Tom Wright. In 1872, the Merchants Transportation Company of Olympia was formed, with Zephyr becoming the company's first steamboat. The vessel was placed on the Olympia, Washington-Steilacoom-Tacoma-Seattle run, making way-stops en route, and competing with another sternwheeler, Messenger, and making the run on alternating days. In 1907, the vessel was sold for scrapping in Seattle.
