= Mary Belle de Vargas =

American artist (1902–1946)

- Born: March 4, 1902; Natchitoches, Louisiana
- Died: January 18, 1946 (aged 43); Natchitoches, Louisiana
- Occupation: Artist

Mary Belle de Vargas (March 4, 1902 – January 18, 1946) was an American artist from Louisiana, known as "the Armless Marvel".

== Early life ==
Mary Belle de Vargas was born in Natchitoches, Louisiana, on March 4, 1902, the daughter of Richard de Vargas and Laure Dranguet de Vargas. Her father was a local jeweler and optometrist. Born without arms, she soon learned to use her strong legs, feet and toes, in place of her missing arms and hands; she was able to feed and groom herself, to write, draw and paint. She graduated from St. Mary's Academy in Natchitoches in 1921, and earned a college degree in arts and Spanish from Louisiana State Normal College in 1932.

== Career ==
In adulthood, de Vargas worked actively as an artist, from her own studio in Natchitoches. She won regional and national awards for her paintings, gave art lectures, taught art classes for children (including a future mayor of the city), and headed several professional art organizations. Her studio attracted curious visitors and tourists, who thrilled to see her autograph a photo souvenir, and took note of her adaptive clothing, sewn by her mother: capes instead of sleeves, trousers sewn into dresses to allow her the full use of legs without immodesty. She was featured on a cigarette card, and in a "Ripley's Believe it or Not!" cartoon panel.

== Personal life ==
Mary Belle de Vargas lived with her parents all her life. She died in 1946 at the age of 44, in Natchitoches. Her admirer and correspondent Gualterio Quinonas published a biography, The Armless Marvel, Mary Belle (1949). In 2005, there were plans for an exhibition of surviving paintings and drawing by de Vargas, in Natchitoches.
