= Burstall, Suffolk =

Village in Suffolk, England

Coordinates: 52.06°N 1.057°E

Burstall
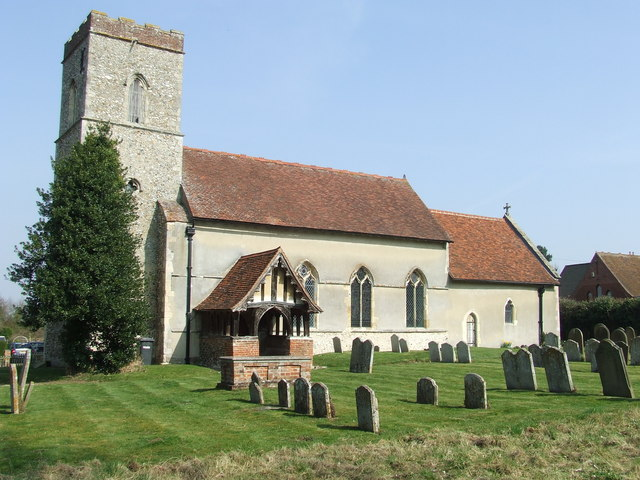
- St Mary's, Burstall

- Location within Suffolk
- Area: 3.11 km^{2} (1.20 sq mi)
- Population: 198 (2011)
  - Density: 64/km^{2} (170/sq mi)
- OS grid reference: TM0944
- District: Babergh
- Shire county: Suffolk
- Region: East
- Country: England
- Sovereign state: United Kingdom
- Post town: Ipswich
- Postcode district: IP8
- Dialling code: 01473

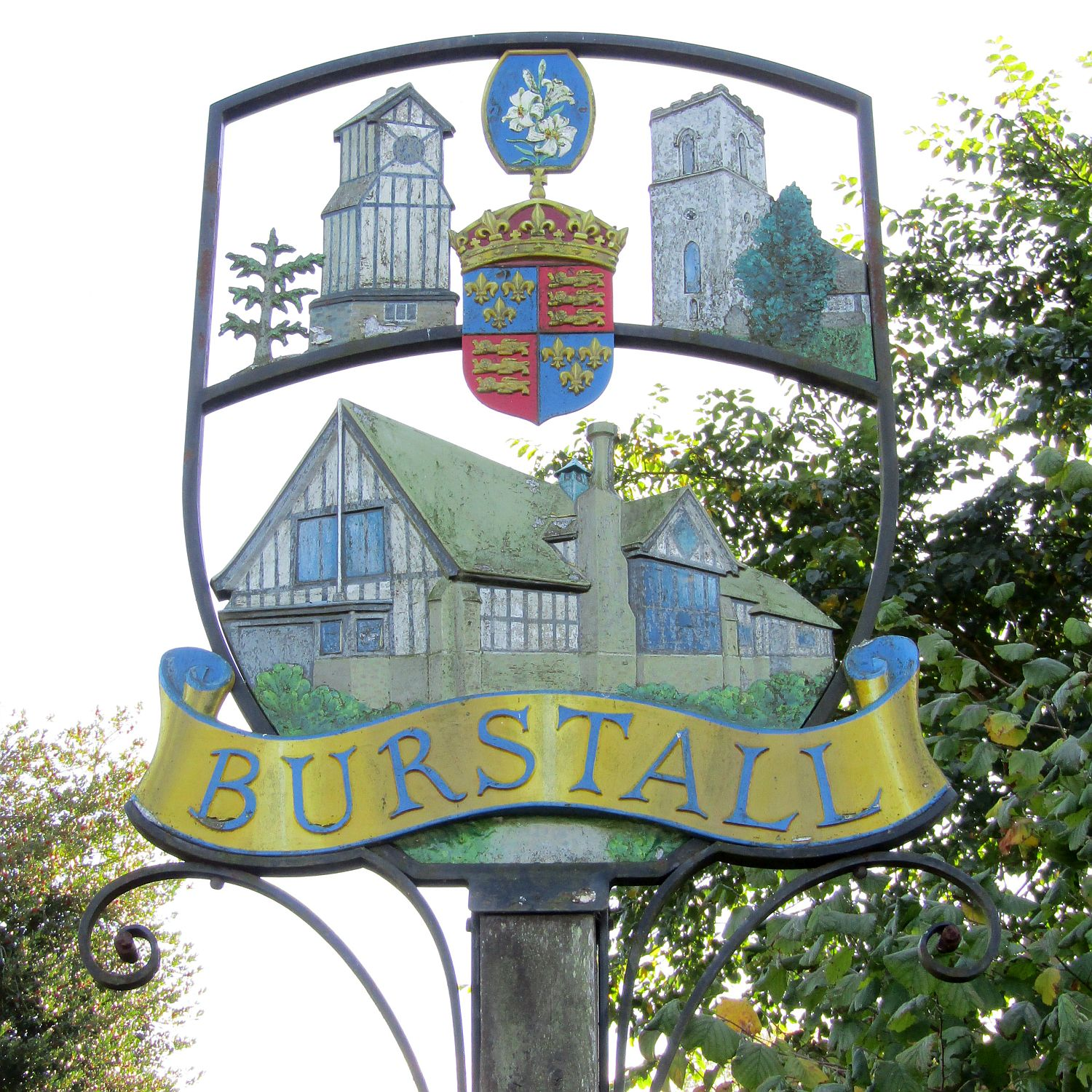
Burstall Village Sign

Burstall is a village and civil parish in Suffolk, England. Located around 4 miles (6 km) west of Ipswich, it is part of Babergh district. The parish includes the hamlet of Burstallhill. Recorded in the Domesday Book as Burgestala / Burghestala. It is in the Belstead Brook electoral division of Suffolk County Council.

The south-western boundary of the parish is delineated by Belstead Brook, a tributary of the River Orwell. The A1071 between Ipswich and Hadleigh crosses Belstead Brook at Burstall Bridge.

Burstall Hall is 2/3 mi (1.1 km) northeast from the village.

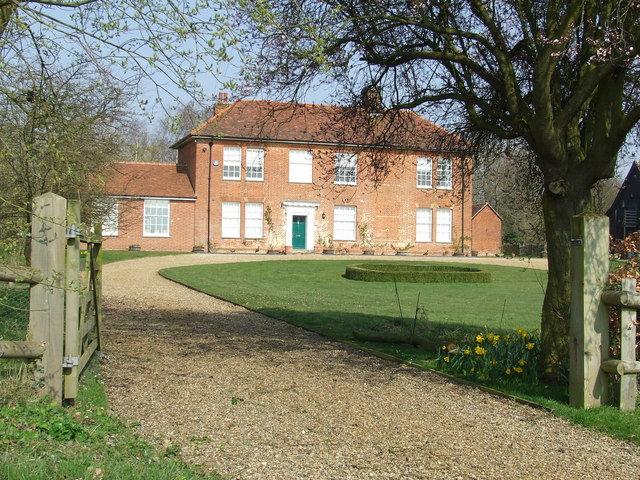
Burstall Hall

Mill Farm is to the west and Hill Farm to the east.

The village hall built in 1910 in memory of John Cranfield. It is a Mock Tudor building with a recent lottery grant improvements. No alcohol is sold in the hall.

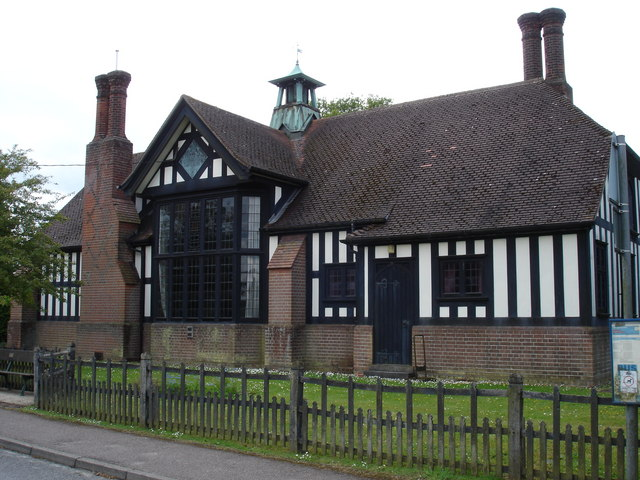
Burstall village hall

The Half Moon public house closed in 1968 and the Post office closed in 2006.

== St Mary's Church ==
The parish church of St Mary is a Grade I listed building. It is largely of the early 14th and 15th centuries, with two Victorian restorations by Frederick Barnes of Ipswich.
