= List of shipwrecks in November 1875 =

The list of shipwrecks in November 1875 includes ships sunk, foundered, grounded, or otherwise lost during November 1875.

== 1 November ==
List of shipwrecks: 1 November 1875
Ship	State	Description
Corine	United Kingdom	The steamship struck a sunken rock and sprang a leak. She was on a voyage from Liverpool, Lancashire to Nantes, Loire-Inférieure, France. She completed her voyage.
Evangelistra	Greece	The brig was run into by a French steamship. She was towed in to Constantinople, Ottoman Empire and beached. She was on a voyage from Yeisk, Russia to Marseille, Bouches-du-Rhône, France.
Heroine	United Kingdom	The ship caught fire at Shoreham-by-Sea, Sussex and was scuttled. She was severely damaged. She was on a voyage from Söderhamn, Sweden to Shoreham-by-Sea.
Hilda	United Kingdom	The steamship ran aground at Maassluis, South Holland, Netherlands. She was on a voyage from Middlesbrough, Yorkshire to a Dutch port.
Luigia E. Rosa	Italy	The brig was wrecked on rocks off The Lizard, Cornwall, United Kingdom. Her crew were rescued. She was on a voyage from Bremen, Germany to Cardiff, Glamorgan, United Kingdom.
Vijf Vrienden	Netherlands	The ship was driven ashore in the Nieuw Diep. She was on a voyage from Rotterdam, South Holland to Riga, Russia.

== 2 November ==
List of shipwrecks: 2 November 1875
Ship	State	Description
Aksar	Russia	The steamship ran ashore on White Island, Isles of Scilly, United Kingdom. She was on a voyage from Cardiff, Glamorgan, United Kingdom to Odesa. She sank the next day.
Baidar	United Kingdom	The steamship ran aground off Königsberg, Germany. She was on a voyage from Königsberg to Hull, Yorkshire.
Catherine	(United Kingdom of Great Britain and Ireland) Guernsey	The ship struck a sunken wreck off the Dudgeon Lightship ( Trinity House) and sprang a severe leak. Catherine was consequently beached at Grimsby, Lincolnshire. She was on a voyage from South Shields, County Durham to Jersey, Channel Islands.
Catherine Griffiths	United Kingdom	The barquentine was wrecked on Corregan, one of the Western Rocks, Isles of Scilly with the loss of eight of her eleven crew. She was on a voyage from Cardiff to Rio de Janeiro, Brazil.
Germania	Portugal	The barque was driven ashore at Porto. She was on a voyage from New York to Porto.
Janet Houston	United Kingdom	The schooner was driven ashore and wrecked on Pladda. Her crew were rescued. She was on a voyage from Ardrossan, Ayrshire to Londonderry. She was refloated on 16 November.
Joseph Scemama	United Kingdom	The brig was wrecked at Safi, Morocco.
Kelpie	United Kingdom	The schooner was severely damaged by fire at Belfast, County Antrim.
Kerelaw	United Kingdom	The barque was destroyed by fire 35 nautical miles (65 km) south west of Lista, Norway. Her crew were rescued by the steamship Danzig (Germany). Kerelaw was on a voyage from Pernambuco, Brazil to Kronstadt, Russia.
Louise	Denmark	The ship ran aground off Königsberg. She was on a voyage from Königsberg to Hull.
Matilda	United Kingdom	The cutter was wrecked at Saint Ouen, Jersey, Channel Islands. Her crew were rescued. She was on a voyage from Swansea, Glamorgan to Jersey.
Mermaid	(United Kingdom of Great Britain and Ireland) Guernsey	The schooner struck a sunken wreck and sprang a leak. She was beached at Grimsby, Lincolnshire. She was on a voyage from South Shields, County Durham to Yarmouth, Isle of Wight.
Presto	Germany	The brigantine collided with Taikun (Germany and foundered in the Atlantic Ocean (48°00′N 12°30′W). Her crew were rescued by Taikun and Dagmar (United Kingdom). Presto was on a voyage from Laguna to Hamburg.
Rotterdam	Netherlands	The steamship ran aground at Maassluis, South Holland. She was on a voyage from Rotterdam, South Holland to Almería, Spain. She was later refloated with the assistance of a tug.
Spring	United Kingdom	The ship was driven ashore at the mouth of the River Axe.
Tempo	United Kingdom	The ship ran aground on the Newcombe Sand, in the North Sea off the coast of Suffolk. She was on a voyage from Sunderland, County Durham to Alexandria, Egypt. She was refloated and taken in to Lowestoft, Suffolk.
Torrington	United Kingdom	The steamship ran aground at Maassluis. She was on a voyage from Java, Netherlands East Indies to Rotterdam. She was refloated.
Vindomora	United Kingdom	The steamship collided with the steamship Korniloff (Russia) off Mucking, Essex and was beached near Gravesend, Kent. Vindomora was on a voyage from Patras, Greece to London.
Vitesse	Belgium	The brig was driven ashore and wrecked at Millisle, County Down, United Kingdom. She was on a voyage from Troon, Ayrshire, United Kingdom to Trinidad.

== 3 November ==
List of shipwrecks: 3 November 1875
Ship	State	Description
Antina	Netherlands	The galiot was abandoned at sea. Her crew were rescued by the schooner Agent Sagoni (Denmark). Antina was on a voyage from a Norwegian Port to Emden, Germany.
Belair	France	The ship was driven ashore and wrecked at Saint-Pierre, Saint Pierre and Miquelon.
Fire Sodskende	Norway	The brig was taken in to Strömstad, Sweden in a capsized condition.
Galley of Lorne	United Kingdom	The steamship was driven ashore at Cartagena, Spain. She was on a voyage from Shanghai, China to New York, United States. She was refloated.
Hampton	United Kingdom	The schooner ran aground on the Middle Cross Sand, in the North Sea off the coast of Norfolk and was wrecked. Her seven crew were rescued by the Caister Lifeboat James Pearce ( Royal National Lifeboat Institution). Hampton was on a voyage from Newcastle upon Tyne, Northumberland to Tarragona, Spain.
Heckla	Netherlands	The steamship ran aground on the Hettarpart, in the Baltic Sea. She was on a voyage from Amsterdam, North Holland to Riga, Russia. She was refloated with the assistance of Svitzer (Denmark) and towed in to Copenhagen.
Köningin Augusta	Germany	The barque ran aground at Dragør, Denmark. She was refloated.
Matilda	United Kingdom	The cutter was wrecked off Jersey, Channel Islands. Her crew were rescued.
Ocean Bride	United Kingdom	The barque was run down and sunk in the North Sea off Cromer, Norfolk by the steamship Weardale (United Kingdom). Her twenty crew were rescued by Weardale. Ocean Bride was on a voyage from the River Tyne to Savona, Italy.
Waterwitch	United Kingdom	The ship was driven ashore near Hornsea, Yorkshire. Her crew were rescued.

== 4 November ==
List of shipwrecks: 4 November 1875
Ship	State	Description
Sarpedon, and James	United Kingdom	The steamship Sarpedon collided with the Mersey Flat James and ran aground in the River Mersey. She was refloated. James sank. The wreck was dispersed by explosives on 10 November.
Queen of India	United Kingdom	The ship ran aground on the Horse Bank, in Liverpool Bay. She was on a voyage from Havre de Grâce, Seine-Inférieure, France to Liverpool, Lancashire. She was refloated and taken in to Liverpool.

== 5 November ==
List of shipwrecks: 5 November 1875
Ship	State	Description
Arab, and Neva No. 3	United Kingdom; Russia	The steamship Arab was run into by the schooner Sjogasten (Norway) off Gotland, Sweden. She ran aground and sank near Visby. The dredger Neva No. 3 that she was towing from Inverness to Kronstadt also ran aground and sank. Arab and were Neva No. 3 refloated on 2 December. Subsequently repaired and returned to service.
Brenda	United Kingdom	The steamship collided with the steamship City of Cambridge (United Kingdom) in Bugsby's Reach, River Thames and sank. She was refloated on 18 December and beached.
Emily Lloyd	United Kingdom	The schooner ran aground on the Tun's Bank, in the River Foyle.
James W. Elwell	United States	The pilot boat was driven ashore on North Beach Haven, New Jersey. She was abandoned by her crew. She was total loss. All items of value were saved.
Johannes	Germany	The brig was driven ashore at Frederikshavn, Denmark. She was on a voyage from Troon, Ayrshire, United Kingdom to Memel. She was refloated.
Marie	Germany	The galiot ran aground on the Isle of May, Fife, United Kingdom and was abandoned by her crew. She floated off and sank. She was on a voyage from the River Thames to Leith, Lothian, United Kingdom.
Newry, and Warren	United Kingdom	The steamship Newry collided with the brigantine Warren in the Belfast Lough off Warrenpoint, County Antrim. Both vessels ran aground.
Nora	United Kingdom	The barque was driven ashore 2 nautical miles (3.7 km) west of Dover, Kent. She was on a voyage from Pensacola, Florida, United States to Grimsby, Lincolnshire. She was refloated and resumed her voyage.
Orpheus, and Pacific	United States	The medium clipper Orpheus and the steamship Pacific collided. Pacific sank with the loss of 273 of the 275 people on board. She was on a voyage from Victoria, British Columbia, Canada to San Francisco, California. Orpheus was severely damaged. She went ashore at Cape Beale the next day and was wrecked. Her crew survived.
Sentinel	United Kingdom	The steamship ran aground in the Scheldt at Bath, Zeeland, Netherlands. She was on a voyage from Antwerp, Belgium to Newcastle upon Tyne, Northumberland.
Vindomora	United Kingdom	The steamship sank in the River Thames. She was on a voyage from Patras, Greece to London.
563	Russia	The lighter was holed by ice and sank at Kronstadt.
Unnamed	Russia	The lighter was holed by ice and sank at Kronstadt.

== 6 November ==
List of shipwrecks: 6 November 1875
Ship	State	Description
Charles Dickens	United Kingdom	The steamship ran aground and sank Boulogne, Pas-de-Calais, France. All on board were rescued by a pilot boat and the Boulogne Lifeboat Louis Fontaine (both France). Charles Dickens was on a voyage from Sunderland, County Durham to Boulogne. The wreck broke in three on 14 November. and was dispersed by explosives on 17 November.
Enigheden	Denmark	The ship ran aground on the Rødsand. She was on a voyage from Copenhagen to Turku, Grand Duchy of Finland.
Johnny	United Kingdom	The ship was wrecked at Ushant, Finistère, France. She was on a voyage from Porto, Portugal to Stockholm, Sweden.
John W. Dodge	United States	The fishing schooner was lost on Old Man's Ledge near Yarmouth, Nova Scotia. Crew saved.
Marbella	United Kingdom	The steamship ran aground at Honfleur, Manche, France. She was refloated on 9 November.
Martha	Norway	The ship was wrecked at Agger, Denmark. Her crew were rescued. She was on a voyage from Newcastle upon Tyne, Northumberland, United Kingdom to Flensburg, Germany.
Mathilde	France	The steamship was driven ashore at Quimper, Finistère.
Pacific	United States	The paddle steamer sank after colliding with Orpheus (United States) off Cape Flattery, Washington. At least 318 lives were lost. There were two survivors; one was rescued by the barque Messenger (United States). The other was rescued by Wolcott (United States) on 8 November. Pacific was on a voyage from Victoria, British Columbia, Canada to San Francisco, California.
Pride of the Colne	United Kingdom	The Thames barge ran aground on the Wallet Sand, in the Thames Estuary. She was on a voyage from London to Colchester, Essex. She was refloated with assistance from the smack Affiance and towed in to Harwich, Essex.
Rival	United Kingdom	The ship collided with the steamship Pelaw in the River Thames and was beached at West Thurrock, Essex. Rival was on a voyage from Erith, Kent to Fraserburgh, Aberdeenshire. She was refloated the next day and taken in to London for repairs.
St. Peter	United Kingdom	The steamship departed from Huelva, Spain for Amsterdam, North Holland, Netherlands. No further trace, presumed foundered with the loss of all nineteen crew.
Wastdale	United Kingdom	The steamship ran aground at Stockholm, Sweden. She was on a voyage from Cardiff, Glamorgan to Stockholm. She was refloated.
Waterloo	United Kingdom	The brigantine was driven ashore and wrecked at Westward Ho!, Devon. All seven cpeople on board were rescued by the Appledore Lifeboat. She was on a voyage from Cork to Bristol, Gloucestershire.
Wilhelm	Germany	The barque was wrecked on the Jadder, in the North Sea off the German Coast with the loss of seven of her crew. She was on a voyage from Hartlepool, County Durham, United Kingdom to Danzig.
Willing Trader	United Kingdom	The Thames barge foundered off the Maplin Sand, in the North Sea off the coast of Essex. Her crew were rescued.

== 7 November ==
List of shipwrecks: 7 November 1875
Ship	State	Description
Fredig	Norway	The barque ran aground near Strömstad, Sweden. She was on a voyage from Harlingen, Friesland, Netherlands to a Norwegian port. She was refloated with assistance.
Goggen	Norway	The schooner foundered off Cape Priolino. Her crew were rescued. She was on a voyage from Ferrol to Santander, Spain.
Haydée	France	The schooner ran aground at Boulogne. Her six crew were rescued by the Boulogne Lifeboat Louis Fontaine (France. Haydée on a voyage from Boulogne to Plymouth, Devon, United Kingdom. She was refloated the next day and taken in to Boulogne in a severely leaky condition.
Marie Josephine	France	The schooner was wrecked on the Doom Bar. Her four crew were rescued by the Padstow Lifeboat. Marie Josephine was on a voyage from Swansea, Glamorgan, United Kingdom to Caen, Calvados. She was refloated on 9 November and taken in to Padstow, Cornwall, United Kingdom in a severely leaky condition.
Rambler	United Kingdom	The schooner struck the wreck of Charles Dickens (United Kingdom) and ran ashore at Boulogne. Her five crew were rescued by the Boulogne Lifeboat Louis Fontaine (France). Rambler was on a voyage from Swansea to Boulogne.
Vivar	Spain	The steamship caught fire in Mount's Bay. She was on a voyage from Málaga to Liverpool, Lancashire, United Kingdom. She was taken in to Penzance, Cornwall and the fire was extinguished.
Wilhelm	(Russian Empire) Grand Duchy of Finland	The ship was driven ashore at Lønstrup, Denmark. Her crew were rescued. She was on a voyage from King's Lynn, Norfolk, United Kingdom to Phytää.

== 8 November ==
List of shipwrecks: 8 November 1875
Ship	State	Description
Anna	Sweden	The ship was driven ashore near "Kailla" with the loss of all hands.
Calcutta	Canada	The ship wrecked on the north side of Grindstone Island in the Magdalen Islands, Quebec with the loss of 23 of the 28 people on board. She was on a voyage from Quebec City to Liverpool, Lancashire, United Kingdom.
Concord	United Kingdom	The ship ran aground on the Whiting Sand, in the North Sea off the coast of Suffolk. She was on a voyage from Helsinki, Grand Duchy of Finland to Ipswich, Suffolk. She was refloated with assistance from the smack Jemima (United Kingdom) and taken in to Harwich, Essex.
Eamont	United Kingdom	The brig was driven ashore and wrecked at Östergarn, Gotland, Sweden. Her crew were rescued. She was on a voyage from Gävle, Sweden to Harwich, Essex.
Forth	United Kingdom	The steamship ran aground and was wrecked near Maassluis, South Holland, Netherlands. Her crew were rescued. She was on a voyage from London to Rotterdam, South Holland.
Johanna	Russia	The ship ran aground off Domesnes. Her crew were rescued. She was on a voyage from Riga to a Belgian port.
Johanna Maria	Sweden	The ship foundered off Kungsbacka. Her crew were rescued. She was on a voyage from Randers, Denmark to Tvedestrand, Norway.
Mayflower	United Kingdom	The ship sank in the North Sea off Lowestoft, Suffolk. Her crew survived. She was on a voyage from Tynemouth, Northumberland to Leeds, Yorkshire.
Meteor	United Kingdom	The barque was abandoned in the English Channel off the coast of Sussex. Her crew were rescued by Johannes (Germany). Meteor was on a voyage from Topsham, Devon to London.
Möwe	Germany	The schooner was wrecked on Westray, Orkney Islands, United Kingdom.
Niger	United Kingdom	The ship was driven ashore and wrecked near Boda, on the east coast of Öland, Sweden. Her crew were rescued. She was on a voyage from Skutskär, Sweden to Hull, Yorkshire.
Nil Desperandum	United Kingdom	The smack was run into and sunk by Kepla (Norway) 8 nautical miles (15 km) north east of the Kentish Knock.
Wilhelm	Germany	The schooner was driven ashore on Læsø, Denmark. She was on a voyage from Wisbech, Cambridgeshire, United Kingdom to Königsberg. She was refloated with assistance and taken in to Fredrikshavn, Denmark in a severely leaky condition.
Willem, Kroonprins der Nederlanden	Netherlands	The steamship collided with the steamship Atjeh (Netherlands) and sank in the Bangka Strait with the loss of two of her crew.
Yokohama	United Kingdom	The ship was sighted off Great Yarmouth, Norfolk whilst on a voyage from the River Tyne to Rotterdam. No further trace, presumed foundered with the loss of all hands.
Unnamed	Italy	The barque was wrecked on the Noorder Haaks Sandbank, in the North Sea off the Dutch coast.
Unnamed	Flag unknown	The schooner was driven ashore near Shoebury, Essex.
Unnamed	Flag unknown	The schooner ran aground on the Nore.

== 9 November ==
List of shipwrecks: 9 November 1875
Ship	State	Description
Carl Johann	Norway	The barque ran aground near "Hellsund". She was on a voyage from Rochefort, Charente-Inférieure, France to Fredrikstad. She was a total loss.
Cavalier	United Kingdom	The steamship departed from Swansea, Glamorgan for Nantes, Loire-Inférieure. No further trace, presumed foundered with the loss of all hands.
City of Waco	United States	The steamship sank after an on-board fire off Galveston, Texas, with the loss of all 56 people on board. She was on a voyage from New York to Galveston.
Glengyle	United Kingdom	The steamship struck a sunken rock and foundered in the Three Chimney's Head Passage with the loss of at least twenty lives. Three of her crew were reported missing. Survivors were rescued by fishing boats. She was on a voyage from Shanghai to Shantou, China.
Hanna	(Russian Empire) Grand Duchy of Finland	The ship was driven ashore at Tversted, Denmark. She was on a voyage from Middlesbrough, Yorkshire, United Kingdom to Stockholm, Sweden. She was refloated and put in to Gothenburg in a leaky condition.
Jacob Aad	Sweden	The ship was driven ashore. She was on a voyage from Middlesbrough to Fredericia. She was refloated and put in to Gothenburg in a leaky condition.
Jetta	Sweden	The ship struck rocks at Fraserburgh, Aberdeenshire, United Kingdom. She was on a voyage from Gothenburg to Fraserburgh.
Ljalmar	Denmark	The schooner was lost in Vappnafjord, Iceland. Her crew were rescued.
Marie Thérèse	France	The schooner was driven ashore at Brest, Finistère with the loss of all hands. She was on a voyage from Dunkirk, Nord to Nantes, Loire-Inférieure.

== 10 November ==
List of shipwrecks: 10 November 1875
Ship	State	Description
Gannet	United Kingdom	The ketch foundered in the Bristol Channel 3 nautical miles (5.6 km) off Watchet, Somerset. Her crew were rescued. She was on a voyage from Newport, Monmouthshire to Watchet.
Gezina	(Russian Empire) Grand Duchy of Finland	The schooner sank near "Lastansari". Her crew were rescued. She was on a voyage from Kronstadt, Russia to Helsingør. Denmark.
James Paton	United Kingdom	The ship was wrecked off "Tukushima", Japan. All on board were rescued.
Sally	China	The ship was wrecked on "Cupeni Point".
Vigilant	United Kingdom	The steamship was driven against the quayside at Fécamp, Seine-Inférieure, France and was severely damaged.

== 11 November ==
List of shipwrecks: 11 November 1875
Ship	State	Description
Amazon	United Kingdom	The tug was driven ashore and severely damaged at "Plarinter", Cornwall.
Edward Everett	United States	The ship was abandoned in the Atlantic Ocean. Her crew were rescued.
Emily Raymond	Canada	The brig ran aground at Wexford. Her nine crew were rescued by the Wexford Lifeboat Civil Service ( Royal National Lifeboat Institution). Emily Raymond was driven ashore on 13 November. She was refloated on 12 December.
Exchange	United Kingdom	The Yorkshire Billyboy sprang a severe leak and was beached at Harwich, Essex. She was on a voyage from Goole, Yorkshire to Brading, Isle of Wight.
Gannet	United Kingdom	The ketch foundered in the Bristol Channel 3 nautical miles (5.6 km) west of Watchet, Somerset. Her crew were rescued. She was on a voyage from Newport, Monmouthshire to Bridgwater, Somerset.
Jeune Philomene	France	The derelict ship was taken in to Tréguier, Côtes-du-Nord by Welsh Girl (United Kingdom).
Metz	United Kingdom	The steamship was driven ashore on Dragør, Denmark. She was on a voyage from Königsberg to Stockton-on-Tees, County Durham, United Kingdom. She was refloated with the assistance of tugs and towed in to Copenhagen, Denmark for repairs.
Ville de Paris	France	The steamship was driven ashore at Havre de Grâce, Seine-Inférieure. She was on a voyage from New York to Havre de Grâce. She was refloated.
Winroth	United Kingdom	The barque was towed in to Mandal, Norway, in a waterlogged and derelict condition.
Wish	United Kingdom	The brig was driven ashore. She was on a voyage from Middlesbrough, Yorkshire to Llanelly, Glamorgan. She was refloated and towed in to Ramsgate, Kent in a sinking condition.

== 12 November ==
List of shipwrecks: 12 November 1875
Ship	State	Description
Agda	Sweden	The full-rigged ship was wrecked near Quiberon, Morbihan, France. Her crew were rescued. She was on a voyage from Cardiff, Glamorgan, United Kingdom to Lisbon, Portugal.
Caerwys Castle	United Kingdom	The schooner departed from Laxey, Isle of Man for Saltney, Cheshire. No further trace, presumed foundered with the loss of all four crew.
Helpmeet	United Kingdom	The barque was wrecked off Sizeboli, Ottoman Empire with the loss of all hands. at least nine lives. She was on a voyage from Varna, Ottoman Empire to a British port.
Marie	Denmark	The brig was driven ashore on Læsø. She was refloated and taken in to Fredrikshavn in a leaky condition.
Sourabaya	France	The barque ran aground off Dunkirk, Nord. She was on a voyage from Aberdeen, United Kingdom to Dunkirk. Her captain and crew came ashore to seek assistance but Sourabaya sank.
Thalia	Germany	The schooner was driven ashore at Monster, South Holland, Netherlands. She was on a voyage from Bergen, Norway to Vlaardingen, South Holland.
Vestalinden	Norway	The brig was driven ashore at Bordeaux, Gironde, France.
William	United Kingdom	The ship departed from Swansea, Glamorgan for Hayle, Cornwall. No further trace, presumed foundered with the loss of all hands.
Unnamed	Flag unknown	The ship ran aground on the St. Seuren Bank, in the Gironde.
Unnamed	Flag unknown	The ship ran aground on the Taiman Bank, in the Gironde.

== 13 November ==
List of shipwrecks: 13 November 1875
Ship	State	Description
Allianza	Italy	The barque was wrecked at Burgas, Ottoman Empire.
Bianca Borzone	Italy	The ship ran aground on the Longsand, in the North Sea off the coast of Essex, United Kingdom. She was on a voyage from Newcastle upon Tyne, Northumberland, United Kingdom to Genoa. She was refloated and taken in to Gravesend, Kent, United Kingdom in a severely leaky condition.
Caerleon	United Kingdom	The ship was driven from her moorings by a tidal bore and sank at Bridgwater, Somerset. Her crew were rescued.
Chard	United Kingdom	The ship was driven from her moorings by a tidal bore and was severely damaged at Bridgwater.
County of Cork	United Kingdom	The schooner was driven ashore at Warrenpoint, County Antrim. She was on a voyage from Silloth, Cumberland to Newry, County Antrim.
Dagmar	United Kingdom	The brig sprang a leak and foundered. All on board took to a raft, but only two survived to be rescued on 28 November by Jane Robertson (United Kingdom). Dagmar was on a voyage from Sierra Leone to Liverpool, Lancashire.
Eliza	United Kingdom	The ship was driven from her moorings by a tidal bore and was severely damaged at Bridgwater.
Elizabeth	United Kingdom	The ship was driven from her moorings by a tidal bore and was severely damaged at Bridgwater.
Flower of the Fleet	United Kingdom	The fishing trawler ran aground on the Nimble Rocks. She was refloated and towed in to Dartmouth, Devon in a waterlogged condition.
Garibaldi	United Kingdom	The ship was driven from her moorings by a tidal bore and was severely damaged at Bridgwater.
Goldfinger	United Kingdom	The schooner departed from Ayr for Belfast, County Antrim. No further trace, presumed foundered with the loss of all five crew.
Good Intent	United Kingdom	The ship was driven from her moorings by a tidal bore and was severely damaged at Bridgwater.
Henriette	United Kingdom	The ship departed from Sunderland, County Durham for Great Yarmouth, Norfolk. No further trace, reported missing.
James	United Kingdom	The ship was driven from her moorings by a tidal bore and was severely damaged at Bridgwater.
James Duncan	United Kingdom	The ship was driven ashore on "St. Peter's Island". She was on a voyage from Charlottetown, Prince Edward Island, Canada to a European port.
Jane	United Kingdom	The ship was driven from her moorings by a tidal bore and was severely damaged at Bridgwater.
John George	Austria-Hungary	The ship was wrecked at Alexandroupoli, Greece.
Kate McDonald	United Kingdom	The ship was driven ashore on "St. Peter's Island". She was on a voyage from London to Charlottetown. She was consequently condemned.
King Cerdig	United Kingdom	The ship ran aground at Queenstown, County Cork. She was refloated.
Neutral	Russia	The ship was wrecked near Molène, Finistère. She was on a voyage from Portugal to Riga.
Portugal	United Kingdom	The ship was wrecked near Molène. She was on a voyage from Riga to Cork.
Queen Victoria	Norway	The ship was driven ashore at Montrose, Forfarshire, United Kingdom.
Sampson	United Kingdom	The ship was driven from her moorings by a tidal bore and was severely damaged at Bridgwater.
Sarah	United Kingdom	The ship was driven from her moorings by a tidal bore and was severely damaged at Bridgwater.
Star King	United States	The ship was driven ashore at Cape Cod, Massachusetts. She was on a voyage from Boston, Massachusetts to the Cape Coast Castle, Gold Coast. She was refloated in late November and taken in to Provincetown, Massachusetts. She was consequently condemned.
Staunch	United Kingdom	The ship was driven from her moorings by a tidal bore and was severely damaged at Bridgwater.
Victoria	United Kingdom	The ship was driven from her moorings by a tidal bore at Bridgwater and was damaged. Her captain was severely injured.
William Nelson	United Kingdom	The brigantine was wrecked at Dundalk, County Louth. All but one of her six crew were rescued by the tug Michael Kelly (United Kingdom); the captain's wife drowned. The crewman left on board was presumed to have drowned.
Eight unnamed vessels	United Kingdom	The ships were driven from their moorings by a tidal bore and were damaged at Bridgwater. One person was killed.

== 14 November ==
List of shipwrecks: 14 November 1875
Ship	State	Description
Alma	France	The schooner foundered off "Welcome Mouth", Cornwall, United Kingdom. She was on a voyage from Swansea, Glamorgan, United Kingdom to La Rochelle, Charente-Inférieure.
Ann Beer	United Kingdom	The ship ran aground at Padstow, Cornwall. She was on a voyage from Liverpool, Lancashire to Dordrecht, South Holland, Netherlands. She was refloated and taken in to Padstow in a leaky condition.
Annie	United Kingdom	The ship was driven ashore at Milford Haven, Pembrokeshire. She was refloated with assistance.
Arnold	Germany	The ship ran aground on the Mellum Platte, in the North Sea off the German coast and was wrecked. Her crew were rescued. She was on a voyage from Sundsvall, Sweden to Brake.
Astrida	Spain	The ship was driven ashore and wrecked at Audresselles, Pas-de-Calais, France with the loss of nine of the twenty people on board. She was on a voyage from New Orleans, Louisiana, United States to Boulogne, Pas-de-Calais.
A. T. Lukovich	Austria-Hungary	The ship was wrecked near Jaffa, Ottoman Syria.
Bangkok, and Rajattianuhar	Siam; India	The steamship Bangkok collided with Rajattianuhar in the Bangkok River. Both vessels sank. Bangkok was on a voyage from Bangkok to Singapore, Straits Settlements. She was refloated on 16 November and taken in to Bangkok.
Carolina	United Kingdom	The schooner was abandoned at sea. Her crew were rescued.
Chiavari	Italy	The ship collided with Oberon (United Kingdom and sank off Queenstown, County Cork, United Kingdom with the loss of twelve of her fourteen crew. Survivors were rescued by Oberon. Chiavari was on a voyage from Buenos Aires, Argentina to Liverpool.
Clara	United Kingdom	The brigantine was driven ashore and wrecked at Spurn Point, East Riding of Yorkshire. Her crew were rescued.
Cresswell	United Kingdom	The ship was driven ashore in the Ghent–Terneuzen Canal, blocking it.
Culmore	United Kingdom	The steamship was driven ashore at Holyhead, Anglesey. She was on a voyage from Fleetwood, Lancashire to Santander, Spain. She was refloated with the assistance of a tug.
Eleanor and Mary	United Kingdom	The ship was driven ashore at Milford Haven, Pembrokeshire. Her crew were rescued by the Fishguard Lifeboat Sir Edward Perrot ( Royal National Lifeboat Institution). She was on a voyage from Caernarfon to Hurst Castle, Hampshire.
Elizabeth and Susan	United Kingdom	The schooner was wrecked on the Stoney Binks, in the North Sea off the mouth of the Humber. Her crew were rescued by the Spurn Point Lifeboat.
Esther	United Kingdom	The ship was abandoned off the Dutch coast. Her crew were rescued. She was on a voyage from Sunderland, County Durham to Rotterdam, South Holland, Netherlands.
Gogo	United Kingdom	The steamship was driven ashore at Middlesbrough, Yorkshire. She was refloated the next day.
Gondola	(United Kingdom of Great Britain and Ireland) Cape Colony	The full-rigged ship was driven ashore and sank at Lindisfarne, Northumberland.
Harriet and Eliza	United Kingdom	The schooner was abandoned in the North Sea. Her crew were rescued by the smack Why Not (United Kingdom). Harriet and Eliza was on a voyage from London to Dordrecht, South Holland, Netherlands.
Independence	United Kingdom	The ship sank at Milford Haven. Her crew were rescued by the Fishguard Lifeboat Sir Edward Perrot ( Royal National Lifeboat Institution). She was on a voyage from Portmadoc, Caernarfonshire to Hull, Yorkshire.
Laura	United Kingdom	The smack was wrecked at Goodwick, Pembrokeshire. Her crew were rescued by the Fishguard Lifeboat Sir Edward Perrot ( Royal National Lifeboat Institution).
MacLeod	United Kingdom	The steamship was wrecked east of Cape Palos, Spain. She was on a voyage from Barcelona to Huelva.
Marston	United Kingdom	The brigantine ran aground on the Trinity Sand, in the Humber and sank. Her crew were rescued. She was on a voyage from Seaham, County Durham to Hull.
Mary	Greece	The brig collided with the steamship Vanessa in the English Channel and was abandoned by her crew, who were rescued by Vanessa.
Mary Ann Bond	United Kingdom	The schooner was driven ashore and wrecked at Dinas Cross, Pembrokeshire. She was on a voyage from Workington, Cumberland to Llanelly, Glamorgan.
Neva	United Kingdom	The schooner foundered off the Mull of Kintyre, Argyllshire with the loss of all hands.
Professor Daa	Norway	The ship was driven ashore on Inchkeith, Fife, United Kingdom. She was on a voyage from Leith, Lothian, United Kingdom to Kragerø. She was refloated and put back to Leith in a leaky condition.
Savage	United Kingdom	The ship was driven ashore and wrecked at Catanzaro, Italy.
Sisters	United Kingdom	The schooner was driven ashore and wrecked at Clovelly, Devon. Her crew were rescued by the Clovelly Lifeboat Alexander and Matilda Boetefeur ( Royal National Lifeboat Institution). Sisters was on a voyage from Swansea, Glamorgan to Honfleur, Manche, France.
Slaney	United Kingdom	The ship sank at Bangor, County Down.
Sylph	United Kingdom	The ship was driven ashore and wrecked at "Goldstrup", Pembrokeshire.
Thomas Vaughan	United Kingdom	The steamship was driven ashore at Middlesbrough.
Yole	Italy	The barque was driven ashore and wrecked at Hendon, County Durham, United Kingdom. Her fifteen crew were rescued by rocket apparatus. She was on a voyage from Antwerp, Belgium to Newcastle upon Tyne, Northumberland, United Kingdom.
Unnamed	United Kingdom	The steam wherry sank at Middlesbrough. She was on a voyage from Newcastle upon Tyne to Middlesbrough.

== 15 November ==
List of shipwrecks: 15 November 1875
Ship	State	Description
Adelheid	Germany	The ship was abandoned in the Atlantic Ocean. Her crew were rescued by Alpaca (United Kingdom). Adelheid was on a voyage from Akyab, Burma to Falmouth, Cornwall, United Kingdom.
Alberta	United Kingdom	The schooner was driven ashore and wrecked at Cardigan. Her crew were rescued. She was on a voyage from Glasgow, Renfrewshire to Cardiff, Glamorgan.
Anna	France	The ship foundered in the Atlantic Ocean off Bude, Cornwall. Her six crew survived.
Arnold	Germany	The sschooner ran aground and was wrecked on the Mellum Platte, in the North Sea off the German coast. She was on a voyage from Sundsvall, Sweden to Brake.
A. T. Lucovich	Austria-Hungary	The ship was wrecked at Jaffa, Ottoman Syria.
Bon Père	United Kingdom	The brig was taken in to Dunkirk, Nord in a severely damaged and waterlogged condition. She was on a voyage from Gothenburg, Sweden to Dunkirk.
Brilliant	United Kingdom	The schooner was driven ashore at Ramsey, Isle of Man.
Caroline Beeson	United Kingdom	The ship was driven ashore and wrecked at Portreath, Cornwall. Her crew were rescued. She was on a voyage from Swansea, Glamorgan to Barcelona, Spain.
Catherine Eliza	United Kingdom	The schooner foundered in the North Sea. Her three crew were rescued by Milo (United Kingdom). Catherine Eliza was on a voyage from Caernarfon to Charlestown, Fife.
Conqueror	United Kingdom	The schooner ran aground on the wreck of the steamship Brenda (United Kingdom), severely damaging Brenda. Conqueror was refloated and beached at Greenwich, Kent.
Dragon	United Kingdom	The steamship was severely damaged at Rotherhithe, Surrey when the drydock she was being repaired in was inundated by floodwater.
Eleanor Mary	United Kingdom	The ship was driven ashore and wrecked at Goodwick, Pembrokeshire. Her crew were rescued by the Goodwick Lifeboat.
Elizabeth and Susan	United Kingdom	The ship was wrecked on the Stoney Binks, off the mouth of the Humber. Her crew were rescued.
Fleetwing	United Kingdom	The barque collided with the Gull Lightship ( Trinity House) and was severely damaged. She was assisted in to Ramsgate, Kent by the Broadstairs Lifeboat and a steamship.
George Howard	United Kingdom	The schooner was driven ashore at Strandby, Denmark. She was on a voyage from Hartlepool, County Durham to Aalborg, Denmark.
Glenroe	United Kingdom	The ship was driven ashore at Pointe-du-Chêne, New Brunswick, Canada. She was on a voyage from Pointe-du-Chêne to Liverpool, Lancashire.
Independence	United Kingdom	The schooner was driven ashore and wrecked at Goodwick. Her crew were rescued by the Goodwick Lifeboat. She was on a voyage from Portmadoc, Caernarfonshire to Hull, Yorkshire.
Isabella	United Kingdom	The brigantine was abandoned in the North Sea 20 nautical miles (37 km) south east of the Farne Islands, Northumberland. Her crew were rescued by Bon Accord (United Kingdom).
Jane	United Kingdom	The brig was wrecked at Craster, Northumberland. Her crew were rescued. She was on a voyage from Cowes, Isle of Wight to Seaham, County Durham.
Lady Buller	United Kingdom	The ship departed from London for Goole, Yorkshire. No further trace, reported missing.
Marie Jeanne	France	The ship was driven ashore and wrecked 6 nautical miles (11 km) south of Bridlington, Yorkshire, United Kingdom with the loss of four of her seven crew. Survivors were rescued by the Coastguard. She was on a voyage from Middlesbrough, Yorkshire to Bordeaux, Gironde.
Marston	United Kingdom	The brigantine ran aground on the Trinity Sand, in the North Sea off the coast of Lincolnshire. Her crew were rescued.
MacMahon	Norway	The schooner was driven ashore at Strandby. She was on a voyage from Charlestown, Cornwall, United Kingdom to "Skjeiskaer".
Pilot	United Kingdom	The schooner was driven ashore at Wexford. Her crew were rescued.
Princess Royal	United Kingdom	The schooner was driven ashore and wrecked at Goodwick. Her crew were rescued by the Fishguard Lifeboat Sir Edward Perrot ( Royal National Lifeboat Institution). She was on a voyage from Cardiff, Glamorgan to Caen, Calvados, France.
Richard and Erich	United Kingdom	The brig was driven ashore near Ventava, Courland Governorate.
Rival	United Kingdom	The ship was driven ashore and severely damaged at Kingstown, County Dublin. She was on a voyage from Dundalk, County Louth to Maryport, Cumberland.
Ruby	United Kingdom	The barque caught fire. She was towed in to Lisbon, Portugal by the steamship Joseph Dodds (United Kingdom).
Sir Robert Sale	United Kingdom	The barque was severely damaged by fire at London.
Soskummeren	Norway	The sbrig was driven ashore 2 nautical miles (3.7 km) east of Dunkirk and was severely damaged. She was on a voyage from a Baltic port to Honfleur, Manche, France.
Souffleur	French Navy	The paddle corvette ran aground off the coast of Finistère. She was refloated and taken in to Le Conquet in a severely leaky condition.
Unnamed	Flag unknown	The ship was driven ashore and wrecked at Hartland Point, Devon, United Kingdom with the loss of all hands.
Unnamed	Flag unknown	The schooner sank at Ramsgate.
Unnamed	United Kingdom	The ship was wrecked in the Raz de Sein.
Unnamed	United Kingdom	The ship was wrecked in the Baie des Trépassés.

== 16 November ==
List of shipwrecks: 16 November 1875
Ship	State	Description
Abbie N. Franklin	United States	The ship was driven ashore at Newport, Monmouthshire. She was on a voyage from Newport to Saint Thoma, Virgin Islands.
Blanca Borzone	Italy	The ship was driven ashore. She was on a voyage from Newcastle upon Tyne, Northumberland, United Kingdom to Genoa. She was refloated and taken in to Gravesend, Kent in a leaky condition.
Confederate Star	United Kingdom	The ship was wrecked in the North Sea at the mouth of the Ems. Her crew were rescued. She was on a voyage from Iquique, Chile to Hamburg, Germany.
Charles Tottie	United Kingdom	The ship was driven ashore at "Segarttad", on the east coast of Öland, Sweden. She was on a voyage from Oscarshamn, Sweden to Sunderland, County Durham.
Deux Secours	France	The brig was driven ashore. She was on a voyage from Hamburg to Newcastle upon Tyne. She was refloated and put in to Cuxhaven, Germany.
Emma	Denmark	The ship was driven ashore and wrecked at Sæby. She was on a voyage from Bornholm to Ærøskøbing.
Foreningen	Flag unknown	The ship was wrecked near Étaples, Pas-de-Calais, France with the loss of all but two of her crew. She was on a voyage from South Shields, County Durham to Fort-de-France, Martinique.
Halvard	Norway	The ship put in to Copenhagen, Denmark in a waterlogged condition. She was on a voyage from Riga, Russia to Harlingen, Friesland, Netherlands.
Hope	United Kingdom	The smack sank in the Bristol Channel off Burnham-on-Sea, Somerset. Her crew were rescued. She was on a voyage from Bridgwater, Somerset to Barnstaple, Devon.
Lady Louisa	United Kingdom	The ship was wrecked on the Île de Sein, Finistère. Her 21 crew survived. She was on a voyage from Cardiff, Glamorgan to São Vicente, Cape Verde Islands.
Lizzie	(Dominion of Newfoundland) Newfoundland Colony	The coaster, a steamship, sank at Harbour Grace.
Marianne Bertha	United Kingdom	The ship ran aground at Pillau, Germany. She was on a voyage from Newcastle upon Tyne to Pillau. She was refloated.
Ocean Queen	United Kingdom	The ship departed from South Shields for Shoreham-by-Sea, Sussex. No further trace, reported missing.
Ocean Spray	United Kingdom	The ship departed from South Shields for Shoreham-by-Sea. No further trace, reported missing.
Oskar II	Norway	The ship was driven ashore at Pillau. She was refloated.
Unnamed	France	The schooner was driven ashore and wrecked at Boulmer, Northumberland.
Unnamed	Flag unknown	The schooner ran aground on the East Hoyle Bank, in Liverpool Bay.

== 17 November ==
List of shipwrecks: 17 November 1875
Ship	State	Description
Cosmopolitan	United Kingdom	The steamship ran aground on the Pagin Sand. She was on a voyage from Hamburg, Germany to London. She was refloated and put back to Hamburg.
Forenwynenque	United Kingdom	The ship was wrecked at Étaples, Pas-de-Calais, France with the loss of eight of her ten crew.
Luignio la Monaco	Italy	The brig was abandoned off Sark, Channel Islands. She was boarded by some Sark fishermen and taken in to Guernsey, Channel Islands.

== 18 November ==
List of shipwrecks: 18 November 1875
Ship	State	Description
Debut	France	The schooner was driven ashore and wrecked at Boulmer, Northumberland, United Kingdom. She was on a voyage from East Wemyss, Fife, United Kingdom to Gravelines, Nord.
L'Amico	Italy	The barque was abandoned in a sinking condition. Her crew were rescued by the steamship Zeus (United Kingdom. L'Amico was on a voyage from Cardiff, Glamorgan, United Kingdom to Genoa.
Mary Garland	(United Kingdom of Great Britain and Ireland) Guernsey	The ship sprang a leak and foundered in the North Sea 12 nautical miles (22 km) east of Southwold, Suffolk. Her ten crew took to a boat; they were rescued the next day by the fishing lugger Gratitude (United Kingdom).
Mary Moore	United Kingdom	The ship was abandoned in the Atlantic Ocean. Her crew were rescued by Mirzapore (United Kingdom). Mary Moore was on a voyage from Jamaica to London.
Ville de l'Orient	France	The schooner ran aground on the Lillegrunden, in the Baltic Sea. Her crew were rescued. She was on a voyage from Bayonne, Basses-Pyrénées to Stettin, Germany.

== 19 November ==
List of shipwrecks: 19 November 1875
Ship	State	Description
Alert	United Kingdom	The schooner was driven ashore at Corton, Suffolk. Her crew were rescued.
Affigham	United Kingdom	The barque departed from the River Tyne for Cartagena, Spain. Presumed foundered with the loss of all fourteen crew; a lifebuoy from the ship was found at sea.
Barba Zvane	Trieste	The barque ran aground on the Herd Sand, in the North Sea off the coast of County Durham, United Kingdom. All fourteen people on board were rescued by the North Shields Lifeboat Noble Institution ( Royal National Lifeboat Institution). She subsequently broke up.
Cyrus	United Kingdom	The brig ran aground at Southend, Essex.
Edward	United Kingdom	The schooner sprang a leak and foundered in the Irish Sea 10 nautical miles (19 km) south east to Carlingford, County Louth. Her crew were rescued by Edward (United Kingdom). Edward was on a voyage from Wexford to Glasgow, Renfrewshire.
Harmonie	United Kingdom	The ship was wrecked on the Horns Reef. Her crew were rescued. She was on a voyage from Hull, Yorkshire to Odense, Denmark.
Johanna Antoinette	Netherlands	The three-masted schooner ran aground and was wrecked off Cardigan, United Kingdom. Her five crew were rescued by the Cardigan Lifeboat John Stuart ( Royal National Lifeboat Institution). Also reported lost at Cardiff, Glamorgan, United Kingdom. Johanna Antoinette was on a voyage from 's Gravenhage, South Holland to Lisbon, Portugal. She was refloated on 25 November.
John Sauber	Germany	The steamship departed from Sunderland, County Durham, united Kingdom for Hamburg. No further trace, presumed foundered with the loss of all 25 crew.
J. Williams	United Kingdom	The shipcollided with the steamship Camel (United Kingdom) in the Kingroad and was beached on the coast of Somerset. She was on a voyage from New York, United States to Bristol, Gloucestershire.
Mary	(United Kingdom of Great Britain and Ireland) Guernsey	The ship foundered off Great Yarmouth, Norfolk. Her crew were rescued. She was on a voyage from Newcastle upon Tyne, Northumberland to Poole, Dorset.
Old Harry	United Kingdom	The ship was run into by the steamship Sea Flower (United Kingdom) and sank in the Belfast Lough. She was on a voyage from Ardrossan, Ayrshire to Whiteabbey, County Antrim.
Oriental	United Kingdom	The full-rigged ship was abandoned and set afire in the Atlantic Ocean. Her crew were rescued by the steamship Baltic (United Kingdom). Oriental was on a voyage from London to Saint John, New Brunswick, Canada.
Saladin	Netherlands	The two-masted schooner was wrecked at Cardigan.
Town of Liverpool	United Kingdom	The schooner was driven ashore and wrecked at Buckie, Moray.
Ulriken	Norway	The barque sprang a leak and was abandoned in the North Sea 50 nautical miles (93 km) east south east of Great Yarmouth. Her fourteen crew were rescued by the smack Olive Branch (United Kingdom). Ulriken was on a voyage from South Shields, County Durham to Odesa, Russia.
Victoria	United Kingdom	The smack ran aground on the English Grounds. She was on a voyage from Ardrossan, Ayrshire to Bristol, Gloucestershire. She was refloated and towed in to Bristol.

== 20 November ==
List of shipwrecks: 20 November 1875
Ship	State	Description
Adder	United Kingdom	The ship ran aground on the Goodwin Sands, Kent. She was on a voyage from Dunkirk, Nord, France to London. She was refloated and completed her voyage.
Ægir	Denmark	The brig was driven onto the Holme Sand, in the North Sea off the coast of Suffolk, United Kingdom. She was refloated and towed in to Lowestoft, Suffolk by the tug Despatch (United Kingdom).
Agatha	United Kingdom	The ship was driven ashore at Corton, Suffolk. Her crew were rescued.
Antina	Germany	The schooner foundered off the Galloper Sand, in the North Sea. She was on a voyage from Swinemünde to London.
Benton	United Kingdom	The full-rigged ship departed from Liverpool, Lancashire for Bombay, India. No further trace, presumed destroyed by fire or foundered with the loss of all 28 crew.
Camtoos	United Kingdom	The ship ran aground at Lowestoft.
Caroline Browne	United Kingdom	The schooner was driven into another vessel and was abandoned in the North Sea off Great Yarmouth, Norfolk with the loss of a crew member. Survivors reached Corton, Suffolk in a boat. Caroline Browne subsequently drove ashore at Pakefield, Suffolk and was wrecked.
Clyde	(United Kingdom of Great Britain and Ireland) Jersey	The smack was driven from her moorings off Great Yarmouth and collided with the fishing boat Ringleader (United Kingdom). Three of her four crew got aboard Ringleader. Clyde was then driven into the fishing boat Guiding Star (United Kingdom). The fourth crew member got aboard Guiding Star. Clyde was subsequently towed in to Harwich, Essex. She was on a voyage from Saint-Malo, Ille-et-Vilaine, France to Newcastle upon Tyne, Northumberland.
Dart	United Kingdom	The ship was driven ashore. She was on a voyage from Hull, Yorkshire to Lowestoft. She was refloated and towed in to Grimsby, Lincolnshire.
Elizabeth	United Kingdom	The ship was wrecked at Salthouse, Norfolk with the loss of all but her captain. The survivor was rescued by rocket apparatus. She was on a voyage from Warkworth, Northumberland to Rouen, Seine-Inférieure, France.
Eurydice	France	The schooner was driven ashore at Sangatte, Pas-de-Calais with the loss of all hands.
Familien	United Kingdom	The ship was driven ashore at Lowestoft. Her crew were rescued.
Ferryhill	United Kingdom	The brig foundered in the English Channel off Calais, France with the loss of all on board.
Friends	United Kingdom	The ship foundered off the mouth of the Humber with the loss of all hands.
Glide	United Kingdom	The schooner collided with Queen Emma (United Kingdom) off Deal, Kent. Five of her six crew got aboard Queen Emma. Glide was presumed to have foundered.
Gomer	United Kingdom	The smack ran aground on the Holywood Bank, in the Belfast Lough.
Iron Duke	United Kingdom	The Audacious-class ironclad was in danger of sinking in the English Channel off the coast of Devon after a valve was accidentally left open. The valve was subsequently closed and a disaster was narrowly averted.
John and Elizabeth	United Kingdom	The sloop was driven ashore at Wells-next-the-Sea, Norfolk. Her crew were rescued. She was on a voyage from "Ledby" to Dartford, Kent.
Ocean Belle	United Kingdom	The brig was driven ashore near Cleethorpes, Lincolnshire. She was refloated on 24 November.
Otto	Norway	The barque was abandoned off Lowestoft. Her crew were rescued. She was taken in to Harwich in a derelict condition on 23 November.
Rapid	United Kingdom	The schooner was driven ashore betweenAldbrough and Cowden, Yorkshire with the loss of all hands.
Tamerlane	United Kingdom	The brig was driven ashore at Lowestoft. Her crew were rescued by rocket apparatus.
Times	United Kingdom	The ship was driven ashore on Shapinsay, Orkney Islands. She was on a voyage from Montrose, Forfarshire to Lerwick, Shetland Islands. She was refloated.
Whitby	United Kingdom	The ship foundered in the North Sea off the coast of Norfolk. Wreckage came ashore at Overstrand. She was on a voyage from Hartlepool, County Durham to Colchester, Essex.
Wild Wave	United Kingdom	The schooner collided with the Cockle Lightship ( Trinity House). Wild Wave was then driven ashore and wrecked at Caister-on-Sea, Norfolk with the loss of two of her five crew. Survivors were rescued by the Caister Lifeboat. She was on a voyage from Seaham, County Durham to London.
Unnamed	Flag unknown	The ship was wrecked on the Haisborough Sands, in the North Sea off the coast of Norfolk with the loss of all hands.
Two unnamed vessels	Flags unknown	The ships ran aground on the Goodwin Sands.
Unnamed	United Kingdom	The ship was driven ashore at Whitstable, Kent.
Unnamed	Flag unknown	The ship foundered off the mouth of the Humber with the loss of all hands.
Unnamed	Flag unknown	The schooner was driven ashore at North Somercotes, Lincolnshire with the loss of all hands.
Unnamed	Flag unknown	The brigantine ran aground at Puffin Island, Anglesey, United Kingdom.

== 21 November ==
List of shipwrecks: 21 November 1875
Ship	State	Description
British Lion	United Kingdom	The smack was driven ashore and wrecked at Pakefield, Suffolk with the loss of all five crew.
Cheroka	United Kingdom	The schooner ran aground at Peel, Isle of Man. She was on a voyage from Dundrum, County Antrim to Whitehaven, Cumberland. She was refloated the next day.
Eliza	Norway	The brig was abandoned in the North Sea off the coast of Lincolnshire, United Kingdom. She came ashore at Saltfleet and was wrecked.
George Smith	United Kingdom	The ship was driven ashore at Calais, France. She floated off and was discovered by some French fishermen in a derelict condition.
Ida	Russia	The schooner collided with the barque Freia (Norway) and was abandoned. Her crew were rescued by Freia. Ida was on a voyage from Geestemünde, Germany to Reval.
James and Elizabeth	United Kingdom	The brig was driven onto the East Burrows Sand, in the North Sea off the coast of Essex. Her eight crew were rescued by the smack Young Pheasant (United Kingdom). James and Elizabeth was on a voyage from West Hartlepool, County Durham to London.
Jeanne	United Kingdom	The galiot foundered in the North Sea. Her crew were rescued by the steamship Norbiton (United Kingdom). Jeanne was on a voyage from Burntisland, Fife to Amsterdam, North Holland, Netherlands.

== 22 November ==
List of shipwrecks: 22 November 1875
Ship	State	Description
Ann	United Kingdom	The brig was driven ashore at Alexandroupoli, Greece.
Antje	Germany	The ship ran aground in the Leda. She was on a voyage from Leer to London, United Kingdom.
Buccleuch	United Kingdom	The ship caught fire in the Indian Ocean. She was on a voyage from Greenock, Renfrewshire to Bombay, India. The fire was extinguished on 26 November. She arrived at Bombay on 6 December.
Catharina	Norway	The schooner was driven ashore and wrecked on Schiermonnikoog, Friesland, Netherlands. Her crew were rescued. She was on a voyage from [[Fredrikstad]] to Emden, Germany.
Florence	United Kingdom	The steamship collided with the steamship Marmion (United Kingdom) in the River Thames at Deptford, Kent and was beached in the Deptford Creek in a sinking condition. Florence was on a voyage from Rotterdam, South Holland, Netherlands to London.
Frithiof	Norway	The ship was wrecked on the Weirinnmer Grounds, in the North Sea. She was on a voyage from London to Dram.
Foxhound	United Kingdom	The schooner departed from the Firth of Forth for London. No further trace, presumed foundered with the loss of all eight crew.
Jeanne	Netherlands	The galiot foundered in the North Sea. Her crew were rescued by the steamship Norbiton (United Kingdom). Jeanne was on a voyage from Burntisland, Fife, United Kingdom to Amsterdam, North Holland.
Ovar Odd	Sweden	The ship was abandoned at sea. Her crew were rescued. She was on a voyage from Sweden to Vlissingen, Zeeland, Netherlands.
Prospero Lavaello	Italy	The brig foundered 30 nautical miles (56 km) north east of Ouessant, Finistère, France. Her crew were rescued by the steamship Volante (United Kingdom). Prospero Lavarello was on a voyage from Cardiff, Glamorgan, United Kingdom to Genoa.
Zoodohos Pighi	Greece	The brig was wrecked 15 nautical miles (28 km) from "Galippia". She was on a voyage from Taganrog, Russia to an English port.

== 23 November ==
List of shipwrecks: 23 November 1875
Ship	State	Description
Alma Elizabeth	Germany	The barque ran aground off "Aracail", Brazil. She was on a voyage from Maceió to Mossoró.
Belted Will	United Kingdom	The ship ran aground on the Tongue Sand, in the Thames Estuary. She was on a voyage from London to Hong Kong. She was refloated and put back to London in a leaky condition.
Cosmopolite	United Kingdom	The ship was driven ashore at Kessingland, Suffolk. She was on a voyage from Dover, Kent to Sunderland, County Durham.
Ethiopian	United Kingdom	The barque was driven ashore in the Dardanelles. She was on a voyage from Odesa, Russia to Falmouth, Cornwall. She was refloated and resumed her voyage.
Foscolo	Italy	The ship struck the Seven Stones Reef while bound from Montevideo, Uruguay for Dundee, Forfarshire with scrap iron and bones. She managed to reach Crow Bar in the Isles of Scilly and sank in the shallows. She was later refloated. She was refloated on 26 November with the assistance of a steamship and taken in to St. Mary's, Isles of Scilly.
General Lamenciere	France	The barque was driven ashore 3 nautical miles (5.6 km) from Barcelona, Spain. She was on a voyage from Senegal to Marseille, Bouches-du-Rhône. She was refloated and taken in to Barcelona.
Goethe, and Ophelia	Norway; Flag unknown	The barque Goethe collided with the steamship Ophelia and both ran aground on the Caloot Bank, in the North Sea off the Dutch coast. Goethe was on a voyage from Skellefteå, Sweden to Antwerp, Belgium. She was refloated and towed in to Antwerp in a waterlogged condition.
James and Elizabeth	United Kingdom	The brig ran aground on the East Broome Head Sands.
Oskar	(Russian Empire) Grand Duchy of Finland	The barque ran aground on the Sunk Sand, in the Lynn Deeps. She was refloated and towed in to King's Lynn, Norfolk, United Kingdom in a waterlogged condition.
Rio Grande	United Kingdom	The ship ran aground and sank on the Zeehonden Plaat, in the North Sea off the Dutch coast. She was on a voyage from Bonny, Africa to Schiedam, South Holland. She was refloated in mid-December with the assistance of a tug and taken in to Zierikzee, Zeeland, Netherlands.
San Antonio, and Wellington	Greece; United Kingdom	The brig Wellington ran aground at Gibraltar. She was then run into by the brig San Antonio and both vessels were wrecked. Wellington lost nine of her thirteen crew. She was on a voyage from Alexandria, Egypt to Falmouth, Cornwall. San Antonio lost seven of her twelve crew. She was on a voyage from Taganrog, Russia to a British port.
Svende Brodre	Norway	The ship was abandoned off the Isle of May, Fife, United Kingdom. Her crew were rescued by the barque Mary Jane (Norway). Svende Brodre was on a voyage from Charleston, South Carolina, United States to a Norwegian port.
Yesterday	United Kingdom	The derelict ship drove ashore Saaremaa, Russia, having been in collision with another vessel. She was on a voyage from Bremen, Germany to Reval, Russia.

== 24 November ==
List of shipwrecks: 24 November 1875
Ship	State	Description
Elizabeth	Germany	The abandoned brig was towed in to the River Tyne by the tugs Stephenson and Victor (both United Kingdom).
Heroine	United Kingdom	The brigantine was driven ashore at Cape Cove, Newfoundland Colony.
Myrtle	United Kingdom	The schooner ran aground on the Gunfleet Sand, in the North Sea off the coast of Essex. She was on a voyage from London to Harlingen, Friesland, Netherlands. She floated off but consequently sank. Her crew survived.
Nora	Norway	The barque was beached at Brancaster, Norfolk, United Kingdom in a waterlogged condition. She was on a voyage from Grimstad to Algiers, Algeria.
San Antonio	Greece	The brig was driven ashore and wrecked at La Atunara, Spain with some loss of life. She was on a voyage from Taganrog, Russia to an English port.
St. George	Greece	The ship was wrecked at Alexandroupoli.
Wellington	United Kingdom	The brig was driven ashore and wrecked at Gibraltar.
William Simpson	United Kingdom	The barque was run down and sunk in the Thames Estuary by the steamship Joseph Somes (United Kingdom), which failed to stop and render assistance.

== 25 November ==
List of shipwrecks: 25 November 1875
Ship	State	Description
Adler	Germany	The ship was driven ashore on Wangeroog. She was on a voyage from Sunderland, County Durham, United Kingdom to Hamburg.
Antelope	United Kingdom	The smack sank off "Goldthorp", Pembrokeshire. Her crew were rescued.
Emily	United Kingdom	The skiff was run into by the steamship Cynthia (United Kingdom) and sank at London.
Loch Laggan	United Kingdom	The ship was sighted in the South Atlantic whilst on a voyage from Liverpool, Lancashire to Melbourne, Victoria. No further trace, presumed foundered with the loss of all 36 crew.
Lyngoer	Flag unknown	The derelict barque was discovered by the steamship Seaham (United Kingdom) and was taken in to Dunkirk, Nord.
Robert Sarcouf	France	The barque was driven ashore and wrecked near Cape Spartel, Morocco. Her crew were rescued. She was on a voyage from Tangiers, Morocco to Cork or Falmouth, Cornwall, United Kingdom.
Salak	Netherlands East Indies	The steamship was lost off "Polsonias". All on board were rescued. She was on a voyage from "Atchen" to Padang.
Tjust	Sweden	The steamship sank off Söderhamn. She was on a voyage from Sundsvall to Gävle.

== 26 November ==
List of shipwrecks: 26 November 1875
Ship	State	Description
Freya	Denmark	The schooner collided with another vessel and was severely damaged. She was abandoned by all but her captain. Her crew were rescued by the other vessel. Freya was on a voyage from Grangemouth, Stirlingshire, United Kingdom to Copenhagen. She was taken in to Grimsby, Lincolnshire, United Kingdom with assistance from the smack Mazeppa (United Kingdom).
Jantje Martins	Netherlands	The ship was wrecked at Porto, Portugal. She was on a voyage from Vila do Conde to Porto.
St. Lawrence	United Kingdom	The steamship was driven ashore in the River Thames at Gravesend, Kent. She was refloated.
Victor	Denmark	The schooner was run into and sunk off "Stadt" by the steamship Ouse (United Kingdom).
Wing MacLagars	United Kingdom	The schooner was driven ashore at "Torp", near Trelleborg, Sweden. She was on a voyage from Stettin, Germany to Newcastle upon Tyne, Northumberland.

== 27 November ==
List of shipwrecks: 27 November 1875
Ship	State	Description
Cinta	Austria-Hungary	The ship barque ran aground on the Daila Shoal, in the Adriatic Sea. She was on a voyage from Leith, Lothian, United Kingdom to Venice, Italy. She was refloated with assistance and taken in to Cittanova d'Istria.
Emmy	Denmark	The barque was driven ashore and wrecked at Dungeness, Kent, United Kingdom. Her crew were rescued. She was on a voyage from Luleå, Sweden to Lisbon, Portugal.
Ironopolis	United Kingdom	The steamship was driven ashore at Seaton Delaval, County Durham. She was on a voyage from Rotterdam, South Holland, Netherlands to Middlesbrough, Yorkshire. She was refloated on 7 December and taken in to Middlesbrough.
Marguerite	Denmark	The sloop ran aground on the Scroby Sands, Norfolk, United Kingdom. She was on a voyage from Skive to Ipswich, Suffolk, United Kingdom. She was refloated and assisted in to Great Yarmouth, Norfolk.
Robert Surcouf	France	The ship was driven ashore and wrecked at Gibraltar. Her crew survived. She was on a voyage from Algiers, Algeria to an English port.
Thistle	United Kingdom	The brigantine ran aground at Ryde, Isle of Wight. She was on a voyage from Fowey, Cornwall to Antwerp, Belgium. She was refloated the next day.
Wega	Germany	The steamship ran ashore in the River Thames at Blackwall, Middlesex, United Kingdom. She was on a voyage from London, United Kingdom to Hamburg.
Zoophyte	United Kingdom	The brig was run down and sunk in the English Channel off The Lizard, Cornwall by a steamship. Her crew took to a boat; they were rescued the next day by a Swedish brigantine. Zoophyte was on a voyage from Llanelly, Glamorgan to a French port.
YH 586	United Kingdom	The fishing cutter was discovered in a derelict condition off Egmond aan Zee, North Holland, Netherlands. She was taken in to the Nieuw Diep.

== 28 November ==
List of shipwrecks: 28 November 1875
Ship	State	Description
Chitto Gattorno	Italy	The barque was abandoned in the Atlantic Ocean. All on board were rescued by Fanny Scalfield (United Kingdom). Chitto Gattorno was on a voyage from New York, United States to Queenstown, County Cork, United Kingdom.
Halden, and HMS Monarch	Norway; Royal Navy	The barque Halden collided with the battleship HMS Monarch 15 nautical miles (28 km) off the Eddystone Rock, Cornwall. Both vessels were severely damaged. Halden was on a voyage from Pensacola, Florida, United States to London. She put in to Plymouth, Devon. HMS Monarch also put in to Plymouth.
River Clyde	United Kingdom	The ship ran aground in the Coleroon. She was on a voyage from Middlesbrough to "Porto Nova". She was refloated on 8 January 1876.
Thiers	Portugal	The barque was driven ashore at Porto. She was on a voyage from Quebec City, Canada to Porto.

== 29 November ==
List of shipwrecks: 29 November 1875
Ship	State	Description
Aina	(Russian Empire) Grand Duchy of Finland	The schooner was driven ashore and wrecked at Dover, Kent, United Kingdom. She was on a voyage from Turku to Dover.
Alice	United Kingdom	The steamship ran aground on the Herd Sand, in the North Sea off the coast of County Durham. She was on a voyage from South Shields, County Durham to Grangemouth, Stirlingshire. She was refloated and towed in to the River Tyne.
Astrea	Denmark	The schooner collided with the steamship Sultan (United Kingdom) and sank in the Elbe. A crew member was reported missing. Astrea was on a voyage from Hamburg, Germany to Helsinki, Grand Duchy of Finland.
Brago	United Kingdom	The steamship collided with another vessel and sank off Skagen, Denmark.
Christine	Germany	The ship ran aground on the Vogelsand, in the North Sea off the German coast. She was on a voyage from Brake to Danzig. She was refloated and taken in to Cuxhaven in a severely leaky condition. She was placed under repair.
Daylight	United Kingdom	The barque was driven ashore and wrecked at Latakia, Ottoman Syria.
Dido	Flag unknown	The schooner ran aground on the Galloper Sand. She was on a voyage from "Rottenburg" to Bridgwater, Somerset, United Kingdom. She was refloated the next day with the assistance of a tug and assisted in to Dover in a waterlogged condition.
Edwin	United Kingdom	The ship was driven ashore at Cape Hatteras, North Carolina, United States. She was on a voyage from Dublin to New York, United States.
Gazelle	Canada Canada	The ship was wrecked on Scatarie Island, Nova Scotia. She was on a voyage from Amsterdam, North Holland, Netherlands to Charlottetown, Prince Edward Island.
J. G. Jenkins	United States	The schooner foundered in Lake Ontario with the loss of all nine people on board.
J. H. Pitt	United Kingdom	The ship was driven ashore at Pointe-du-Chêne, New Brunswick, Canada.
Madelina	United Kingdom	The ship struck a sunken rock and foundered off Anguilla. Her crew were rescued. She was on a voyage from Demerara, British Guiana to London.
Thiers	Portugal	The barque was driven ashore at Porto. She was on a voyage from Quebec City, Canada to Porto.
Victory	United Kingdom	The schooner sank at Mevagissey, Cornwall.
Vine	United Kingdom	The schooner was driven ashore 6 nautical miles (11 km) east of "Killeborg", Sweden. Her crew were rescued. She was on a voyage from Stettin, Germany to Newcastle upon Tyne, Northumberland. She was condemned.

== 30 November ==
List of shipwrecks: 30 November 1875
Ship	State	Description
Alice	United Kingdom	The steamship ran aground on the Herd Sand, in the North Sea off the coast of County Durham. She was on a voyage from South Shields, County Durham to Grangemouth, Stirlingshire. She was refloated and towed in to the River Tyne.
Carl Johan	Sweden	The ship ran aground off Norrköping. Her crew were rescued. She was on a voyage from Nörrkoping to Antwerp, Belgium. She was a total loss.
Carthaginian	United Kingdom	The ship collided with the steamship Biola (Sweden) and was abandoned by her crew.
Iris	United Kingdom	The ship was wrecked on Scatarie Island, Nova Scotia, Canada. She was on a voyage from Chester, Cheshire to Saint John, New Brunswick, Canada.
Livingstone	Norway	The brig was driven ashore and wrecked at Dungeness, Kent, United Kingdom. Her crew were rescued by rocket apparatus. She was on a voyage from Kristiansand to Málaga, Spain.
Louisa Fanny	France	The lugger struck a sunken rock in the English Channel. She was on a voyage from Bayonne, Basses-Pyrénées to Dunkirk, Nord. She put in to Plymouth, Devon, United Kingdom in a leaky condition.
Orto	Italy	The barque ran aground on the Pye Sand, in the North Sea off the coast of Essex, United Kingdom. She was on a voyage from Berdyanski, Russia to Aberdeen, United Kingdom. She was refloated on 4 December and beached at Harwich, Essex, being leaky.
Sparkenhoe	United Kingdom	The ship was abandoned at sea. Her crew were rescued by Fred Eugene (United Kingdom). Sparkenhoe was on a voyage from Bristol, Gloucestershire to Pensacola, Florida, United States.
Swiftsure	United Kingdom	The ship was driven ashore in the Gut of Canso. She was on a voyage from Charlottetown, Prince Edward Island, Canada to an English port. She was a total loss.

== Unknown date ==
List of shipwrecks: Unknown date in November 1875
Ship	State	Description
Algeria	Spain	The steamship was driven ashore and wrecked on Saint Thomas. She was on a voyage from Barcelona to Puerto Rico.
Alethea	Sweden	The steamship ran aground at Stockholm. She was on a voyage from Stockholm to London, United Kingdom. She was refloated with assistance.
Allegro	United Kingdom	The fishing smack foundered in the North Sea with the loss of all hands.
Aurora	United Kingdom	The ship ran aground on the Hittarp Reef. She was on a voyage from Söderhamn, Sweden to London. She was refloated and taken in to Helsingør, Sweden.
Ceres	Netherlands	The schooner was driven ashore at Nantes, Loire-Inférieure, France.
Christiane	Sweden	The barque was driven ashore on Fårö, Sweden. She was refloated.
Clara	United Kingdom	The ship was wrecked. She was on a voyage from Liverpool to Charlottetown, Prince Edward Island, Canada.
Clevedon	United Kingdom	The barque was destroyed by fire at sea. She was on a voyage from Liverpool to Valparaíso, Chile.
Constance	Sweden	The ship was driven ashore near Cimbritshamn. She was refloated.
Cornelia B. Windiate	United States	The wooden schooner disappeared with the loss of all hands during a voyage from Milwaukee, Wisconsin, to Buffalo, New York, with a cargo of corn. Her wreck eventually was discovered in Lake Huron off Presque Isle, Michigan, in 180 feet (55 m) of water at 45.325433°N 83.218433°W.
Daniel Rankine	United Kingdom	The ship was driven ashore at Matane, Quebec, Canada. She was on a voyage from Quebec to Glasgow, Renfrewshire. She was a total loss.
Dunbrody	United Kingdom	The ship was driven ashore and wrecked on the coast of Labrador, Newfoundland Colony. She was on a voyage from Quebec City, Canada to Birkenhead, Cheshire.
Egitto	Flag unknown	The fishing smack foundered in the North Sea with the loss of all hands.
Eleanor Witley	United Kingdom	The brigantine foundered in the Atlantic Ocean 180 nautical miles (330 km) south west of the Isles of Scilly. Her crew were rescued by Peckham (United Kingdom). Eleanor Witley was on a voyage from Lisbon, Portugal to Newport, Monmouthshire.
Eleonore	United Kingdom	The barque was abandoned in the Bay of Biscay before 15 November. Her crew were rescued by the steamship Galilee (France). Eleonore was on a voyage from Cardiff, Glamorgan to Bahia, Brazil.
Ellen Morris	United Kingdom	The ship was abandoned in the South Atlantic. She was subsequently set afire.
Emily Farnum	United States	The clipper was wrecked at Cape Flattery, Washington.
Enrico	Italy	The barque ran aground off Cagliari, Sardinia. She was on a voyage from Newcastle upon Tyne, Northumberland, United Kingdom to Alexandria, Egypt.
Flower	United Kingdom	The ship was driven ashore at Gallipoli, Ottoman Empire. She was on a voyage from Taganrog, Russia to an English port.
Formosa	Victoria	The barque was wrecked at "Bulop", Spanish East Indies before 15 November. Her crew were rescued.
Francis Bourneuf	Canada	The ship was abandoned in the Atlantic Ocean in a sinking condition. Her crew were rescued by ''John Lorway (United Kingdom).
Friends	(United Kingdom of Great Britain and Ireland) Guernsey	The ship caught fire off Beachy Head, Sussex. She was on a voyage from South Shields, County Durham to Guernsey. The fire was extinguished and she was taken in to The Downs.
Gemmer	United States	The ship ran aground on the Marillane Reef. She was on a voyage from New York to Sagua La Grande, Cuba.
George Smith	United Kingdom	The brig was wrecked on the Gunfleet Sand, in the North Sea off the coast of Essex. Her crew were rescued by a steamship.
George V. Richards	Canada	The ship was abandoned in the Atlantic Ocean. Her crew were rescued. She was on a voyage from Maracaibo, Venezuela to New York.
George T. Richards	United States	The ship was abandoned at sea. Her crew were rescued. She was on a voyage from Maracaibo, Venezuela to New York.
Haze	United Kingdom	The ship was abandoned in the Atlantic Ocean. Her crew were rescued. She was on a voyage from Saint John's, Newfoundland Colony to Dungarvan, County Waterford.
Helen Morris	United Kingdom	The ship was destroyed by fire at sea before 28 November. Her crew were rescued. She was on a voyage from South Shields to San Francisco, California, United States.
Java	United Kingdom	The ship foundered at sea. She was on a voyage from Lisbon, Portugal to Bremerhaven, Germany.
J. Brown	United Kingdom	The full-rigged ship foundered in the North Sea, according to a message in a bottle washed up at Warkworth, Northumberland.
Jessie Scott	United Kingdom	The ship was abandoned at sea before 3 November. Her crew were rescued. She was on a voyage from Liverpool, Lancashire to Guayaquil, Ecuador.
Johann Rudolph	Flag unknown	The ship was driven ashore near Calais, France. She was on a voyage from Newcastle upon Tyne to Trieste. She was refloated with assistance from the brig Providence (France).
Juno	United Kingdom	The brig capsized off Strömstad, Sweden. She was on a voyage from Pori, Grand Duchy of Finland to an English port.
Jura	United Kingdom	The ship was abandoned at sea. Her crew were rescued. She was on a voyage from the Newfoundland Colony to Swansea, Glamorgan.
Lady Cecelia	United Kingdom	The ship was driven ashore at San Cataldo, Sicily, Italy. She was on a voyage from Trieste to London.
Lanton	United Kingdom	The brig was wrecked on Fidra, Lothian. Two of her crew were rescued by the North Berwick Lifeboat.
Legaspi	Spain	The steamship was wrecked on Simara Island, Spanish East Indies before 12 November with the loss of seven lives.
Lemo	United Kingdom	The barque ran aground on the Newcombe Sand, in the North Sea off the coast of Suffolk. She was on a voyage from Sunderland, County Durham to Alexandria. She was refloated and assisted in to Lowestoft, Suffolk in a leaky condition.
Maach	Flag unknown	The fishing smack foundered in the North Sea with the loss of all hands.
Margarita	Italy	The ship was wrecked at Alexandroupoli, Greece. Her crew were rescued.
Minmannuth	United Kingdom	The ship was wrecked in the Laccadive Islands before 11 November. Her crew were rescued.
Mladi Mitar	Austria-Hungary	The ship was driven ashore and wrecked at Alexandroupoli
Moura II	Portugal	The brig foundered in the Atlantic Ocean before 3 November. She was on a voyage from Madeira to New York.
Morne	France	The ship was abandoned at sea before 16 November. Her crew were rescued. She was on a voyage from Saint-Pierre, Martinique to "Sansaloens".
N. Churchill, and Normanton	United Kingdom	The ship N. Churchill collided with the steamship Normanton at Grand-Métis, Quebec and was beached. She was on a voyage from Montreal, Quebec to London. She was later refloated and taken in to Quebec City. Normanton sank. Her crew were rescued.
Nina	United Kingdom	The ship foundered in the North Sea. Her crew were rescued by the steamship Beta (United Kingdom.
Norge	Norway	The ship was wrecked at San José before 3 November. She was on a voyage from Callao, Peru to Lobos, Argentina.
Nouvelle Esperance	France	The ship struck the Guestre Rock, off Camaret-sur-Mer, Finistère and sank. Her crew were rescued. She was on a voyage from Rouen, Seine-Inférieure to Pont-l'Abbé, Finistère.
Odin	United Kingdom	The ship was driven ashore at Sainte-Anne-de-Beaupré, Quebec. She was on a voyage from Quebec City to Hartlepool, County Durham.
Onega	Russia	The steamship was driven ashore at Kem. She was refloated and taken in to Arkhangelsk.
Orion	United Kingdom	The fishing smack foundered in the North Sea with the loss of all hands.
Orpheus	United States	The ship ran ashore and was wrecked at Cape Beale, British Columbia, Canada on or after 6 November. Her crew were rescued by a United States Revenue-Marine vessel.
Paquerette	France	The ship was driven ashore near Bourgneuf, Charente-Inférieure. She was refloated and resumed her voyage.
Pascoff	United Kingdom	The ship foundered in the Bay of Biscay with the loss of all 30 crew. She was on a voyage from Cardiff to Odesa, Russia.
Patientia	United Kingdom	The fishing smack foundered in the North Sea with the loss of all hands.
Plover	United Kingdom	The barque was driven ashore and wrecked at Fanorus Point, in the Dardanelles. Her crew were rescued. She was on a voyage from Taganrog, Russia to a British port.
Presidente	Canada	The schooner was driven ashore and wrecked at Pleasant Bay, Nova Scotia with the loss of all crew. She was on a voyage from Halifax, Nova Scotia to Magdalen Islands along with six other schooners. Of this group of seven ships, four were wrecked during this gale.
Rogate	Norway	The derelict barque was towed in to A Coruña, Spain in a waterlogged condition by the steamship Velarde (Spain).
Roma	United Kingdom	The steamship was abandoned at sea. Her crew were rescued.
Senion	United Kingdom	The fishing smack foundered in the North Sea with the loss of all hands.
Silksworth	United Kingdom	The ship was driven ashore at Coalhouse Point, Essex. She was on a voyage from London to Sunderland. She was refloated and completed her voyage.
St. Michael	Canada	The ship was wrecked at Miramichi Bay, New Brunswick. She was on a voyage from Havana, Cuba to Dalhousie, New Brunswick.
Sunbeam	United States	The ship was abandoned in the Pacific Ocean before 29 November. She was on a voyage from Port Townsend, Washington to Lyttelton, New Zealand.
Thyra	Germany	The schooner was driven ashore at "Aalbeck", Denmark. She was on a voyage from Middlesbrough, Yorkshire, United Kingdom to Malmö, Sweden.
Unicorn	United Kingdom	The ship was abandoned in the Atlantic Ocean before 26 November.
William	United Kingdom	The ship was abandoned in Danish waters.
Yumuri	United Kingdom	The barque ran aground on the Marillanes Reef. She was on a voyage from New York to Sagua La Grande.
43	Russia	The lighter was sunk by ice at Kronstadt.
Unnamed	France	The lugger sank at Nantes.
