= Grindstone (disambiguation) =

- Grindstone is a tool used for sharpening

Grindstone may also refer to:

- A type of millstone used to grind grains such as wheat
- Grindstone (horse), 1996 Kentucky Derby winner and sire of the racehorse Birdstone
- Grindstone (album), 2007 album by the Norwegian band Shining
- Grindstone (time tracking software), a program that allows users to create and organize tasks and to track time
- Grindstone 100 Miler, a 100-mile-long (160 km) ultramarathon in Virginia
- Grindstone (video game), a 2019 video game by Capybara Games

Places:

- Grindstone, Pennsylvania
- Grindstone, South Dakota
- Grindstone, Manitoba, a peninsula and part of the Hecla-Grindstone Provincial Park in Manitoba, Canada.
- Grindstone Butte, a summit in South Dakota
- Grindstone City Historic District in Port Austin Township, Michigan
- Grindstone Island (Magdalen Islands), an island in the Magdalen Islands, Quebec, Canada
- Grindstone Island (Ontario), is an island in Big Rideau Lake, Ontario, Canada.
- Grindstone Island, is one of the Thousand Islands, in the St. Lawrence River in the United States of America.
