= Grindstone Creek =

Grindstone Creek may refer to:

Canada

- Ontario
  - Grindstone Creek (Algoma District), a tributary of the Mississagi River
  - Grindstone Creek (Hamilton Harbour), a tributary of Lake Ontario in the Greater Toronto and Hamilton Area

United States

- Missouri
  - Grindstone Creek (Grand River tributary)
  - Grindstone Creek (Hinkson Creek)
- Grindstone Creek (South Dakota)
