= Calcutta (ship) =

Several ships have been named Calcutta for the Indian city of Calcutta:

- Calcutta (1794 ship) was launched in 1794 on the Hooghly River. Between 1797 and 1799 she sailed to England on a voyage for the British East India Company (EIC). In 1799 the French Navy captured her, and the Royal Navy recaptured her. She was lost in 1801 in the Red Sea, sailing in support of the British Government's expedition to Egypt.
- Calcutta (1798 EIC ship) was launched an East Indiaman. She made four voyages for the British East India Company (EIC), and disappeared on her fifth voyage while homeward bound from Bengal.
- Calcutta (1817 ship) was launched at Chester. She was a general trader and in her early years traded with India, sailing under a license from the EIC. She suffered a maritime mishap in 1833, but then traded for another 20+ years until she was last listed in 1857 with stale data.
- Calcutta (1874 ship) was a three-masted sailing ship launched at Quebec. She wrecked the very next year.

== See also ==
- HMS Calcutta – any of five ships of the British Royal Navy by that name
