= Nose to the grindstone =

== See also ==
- Grindstone
- Millstone
- Grindstone (disambiguation)
