= Grindstone, South Dakota =

Unincorporated community in South Dakota, U.S.

Coordinates: 44°08′21″N 101°58′03″W

Grindstone is an unincorporated community in Haakon County, in the U.S. state of South Dakota.

== History ==
A post office called Grindstone was established in 1890, and remained in operation until 1946. The community was named after nearby Grindstone Butte.
