= Ærøskøbing Parish =

Parish in Ærø Municipality, Denmark

Ærøskøbing Parish Ærøskøbing Sogn
- Parish
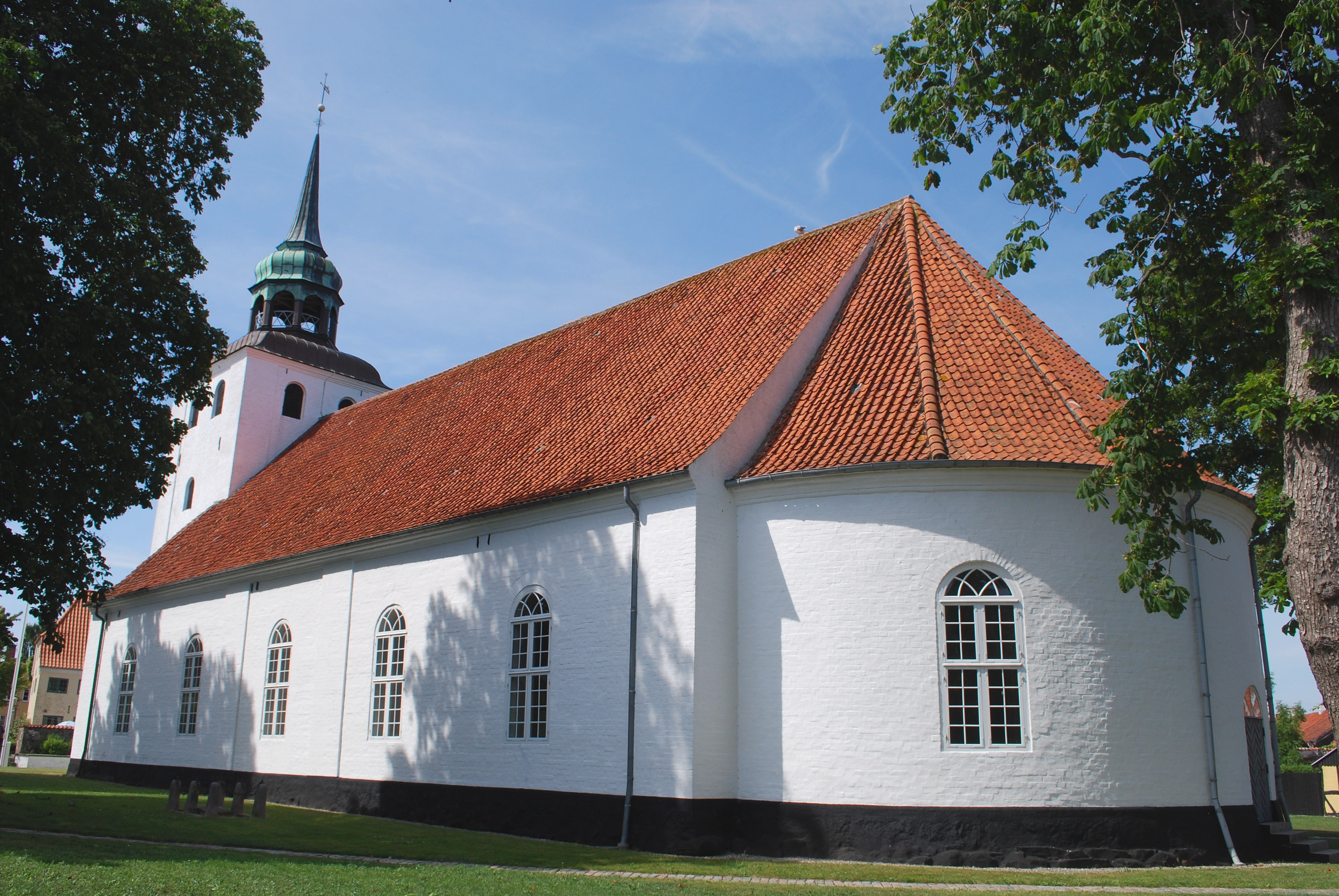
- Ærøskøbing Church

- The parish within Ærø Municipality
- Coordinates: 54.8879°N 10.4122°E
- Country: Denmark
- Region: Southern Denmark
- Municipality: Ærø Municipality
- Diocese: Funen

Population (2025)
  - Total: 986
- Parish number: 7713

Ærøskøbing Parish (Danish: Ærøskøbing Sogn) is a parish in the Diocese of Funen in Ærø Municipality, Denmark. The parish contains the town of Ærøskøbing.
