= Grindstone Creek (South Dakota) =

River in South Dakota, U.S.

Coordinates: 44°02′14″N 101°36′04″W

Grindstone Creek is a stream in the U.S. state of South Dakota named after nearby Grindstone Butte.

== See also ==
- List of rivers of South Dakota
