= Ærøskøbing =

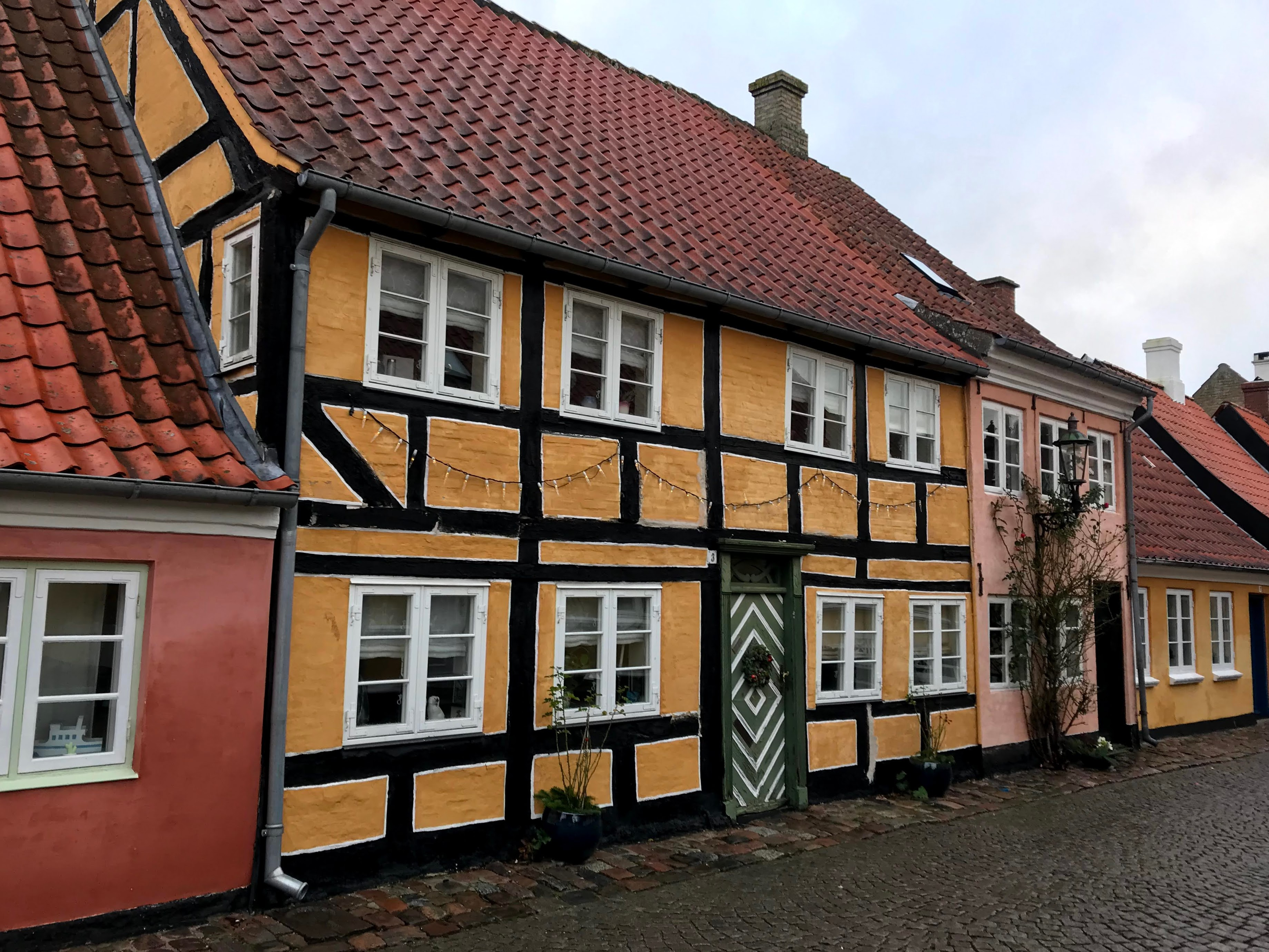

- Coat of arms
- Motto: "Øens købstad"
- Location within Denmark
- Coordinates: 54°53′30″N 10°24′45″E
- Country: Denmark
- Region: Southern Denmark (Syddanmark)
- Municipality: Ærø
- Parish: Ærøskøbing
- Earliest evidence: 12th century

Government
  - Mayor: Jørgen Otto Jørgensen

Population (2026)
  - Total: 917
- Website: www.aeroekommune.dk

Ærøskøbing (Danish pronunciation: [ˈeːˌʁøˀsˌkʰøˀpe̝ŋ]) is a town on the island of Ærø, Denmark. The suffix -købing means a trade town in the languages that derive from Old Norse.

Ærøskøbing's houses and streets are delicately restored to retain the character of the olden days. Most of them are one story tall, and the oldest ones date back to 1645.

In the old part of the town are examples of the work bricklayers, carpenters, and blacksmiths who built the town in the form of vernacular architecture.

Ærøskøbing was awarded the Europa Nostra prize in 2002. The prize is awarded by the EU as a special appreciation of looking after cultural heritage.

== History ==
From about 1250 Ærøskøbing became the commercial and maritime hub of the island. A major fire in 1629 destroyed many buildings, but the town later experienced a revival. Many old homes were rebuilt, and new, larger ones were constructed, reflecting architectural from Funen, northern Germany and the duchy of Schleswig— which Ærø belonged until it was transferred to Denmark (officially in 1867). Today, the town showcases a rich and continuous building tradition spanning several centuries.

== Tourism ==
Ærøskøbing Church located at the market square, is the third church to have been built on that site. In the same square are the two old town pumps, which supplied water to the town until 1952.

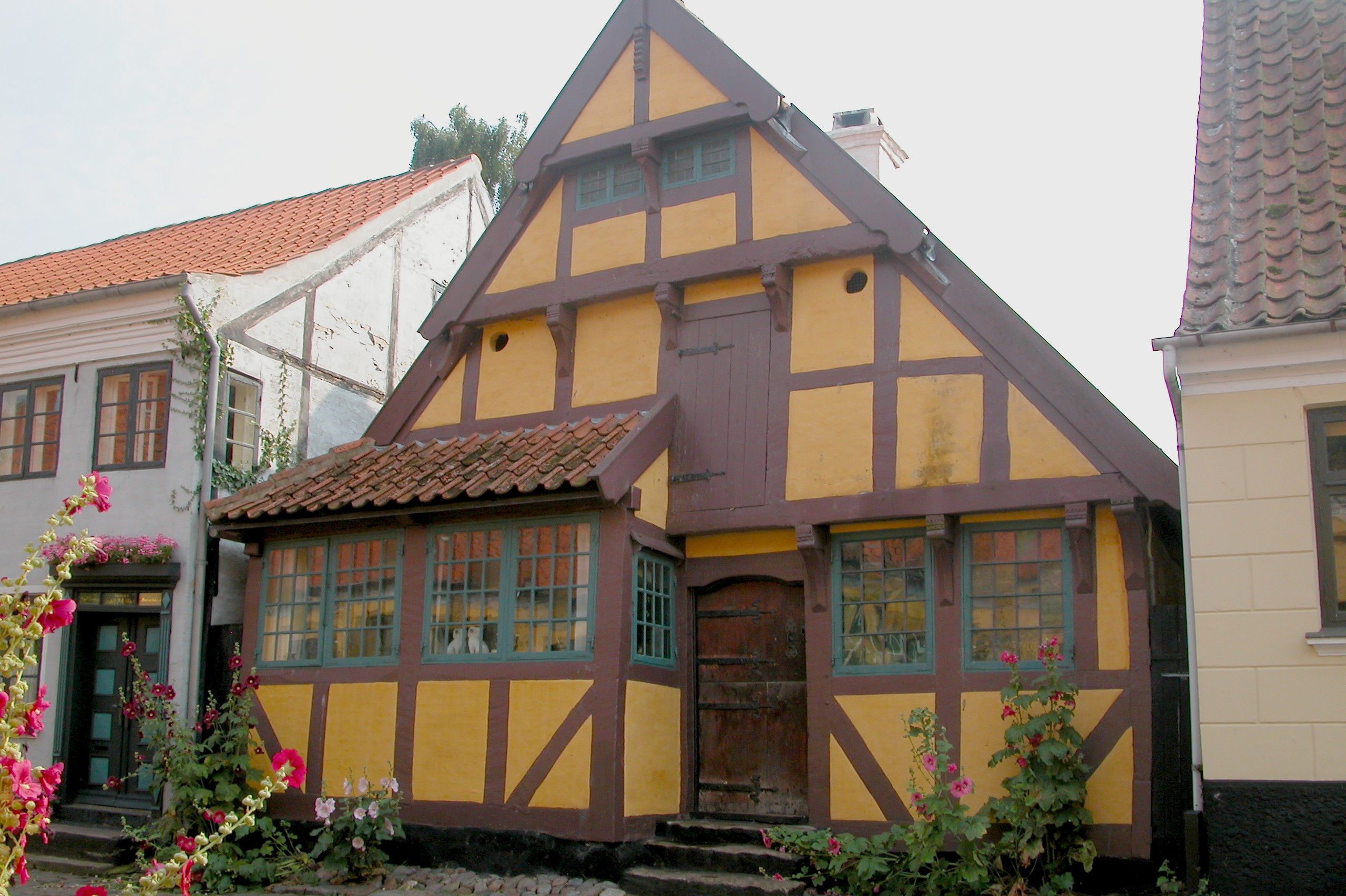
Priors house from 1690

The Prior's house, dated to 1690, is one of Ærøskøbing's oldest known buildings. It was purchased and restored in 1917 by Alexis Prior.

The town's historic harbour has been expanded with the addition of a modern marina. The nearby beach at Vesterstrand, located within walking distance of the town centre, is notable for its row of colourful beach huts.

The cook house: Until the mid-19th century, open fire cooking was forbidden on a ship moored in the harbour due to the risk of fire. The danger of fire on wooden ships was simply too great and the town cook house was built to serve as the harbour cooking facility. The small, whitewashed building is from 1810. The Ærøskøbing Association helped with its restoration in 2001, and now again it serves its original purpose as a place where yachtsmen can prepare food.

The town windmill (of Dutch origin from 1848) has become a landmark for the town, and is approached from the south by the main road.

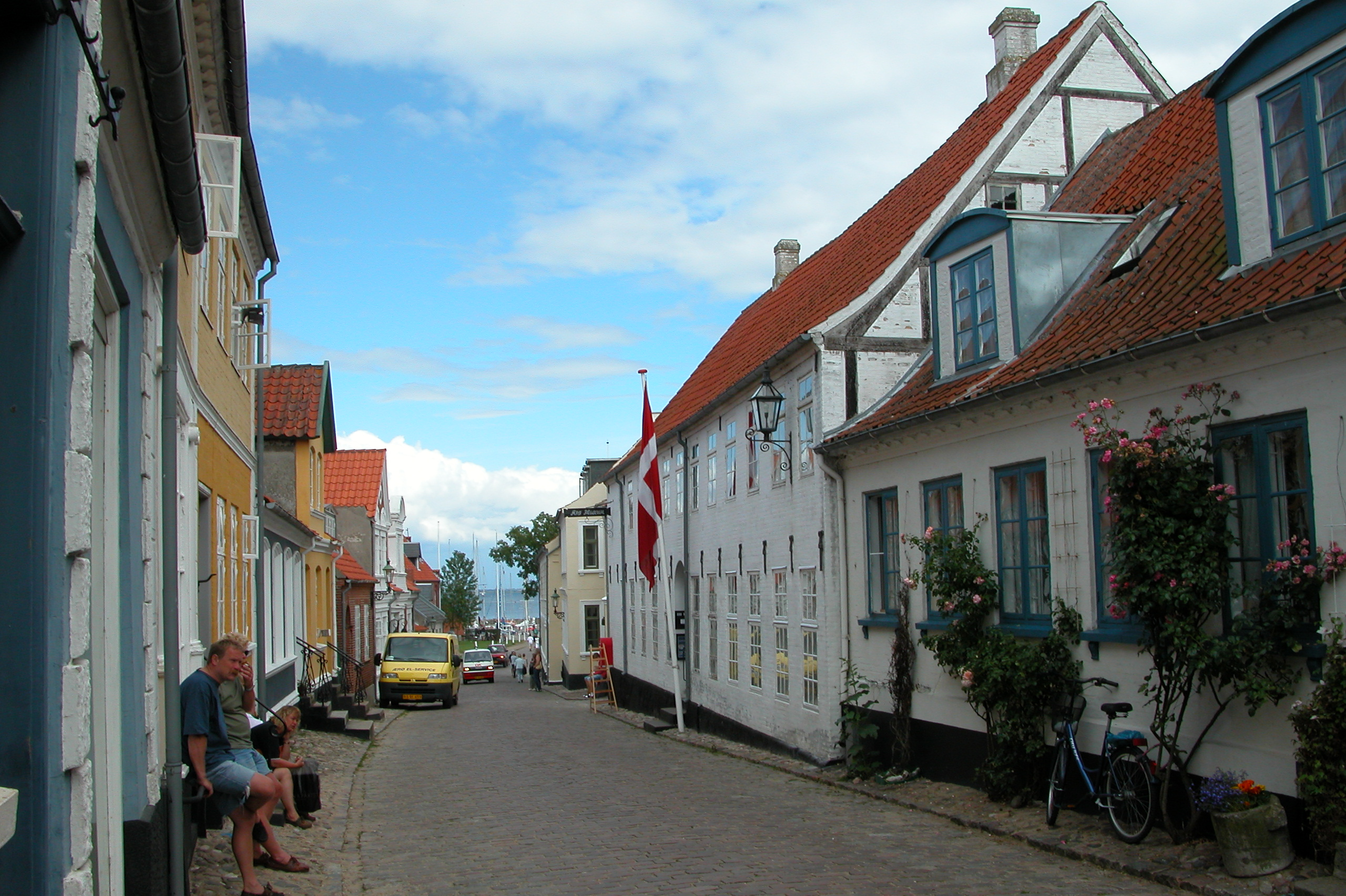
"Brogade" in Ærøskøbing

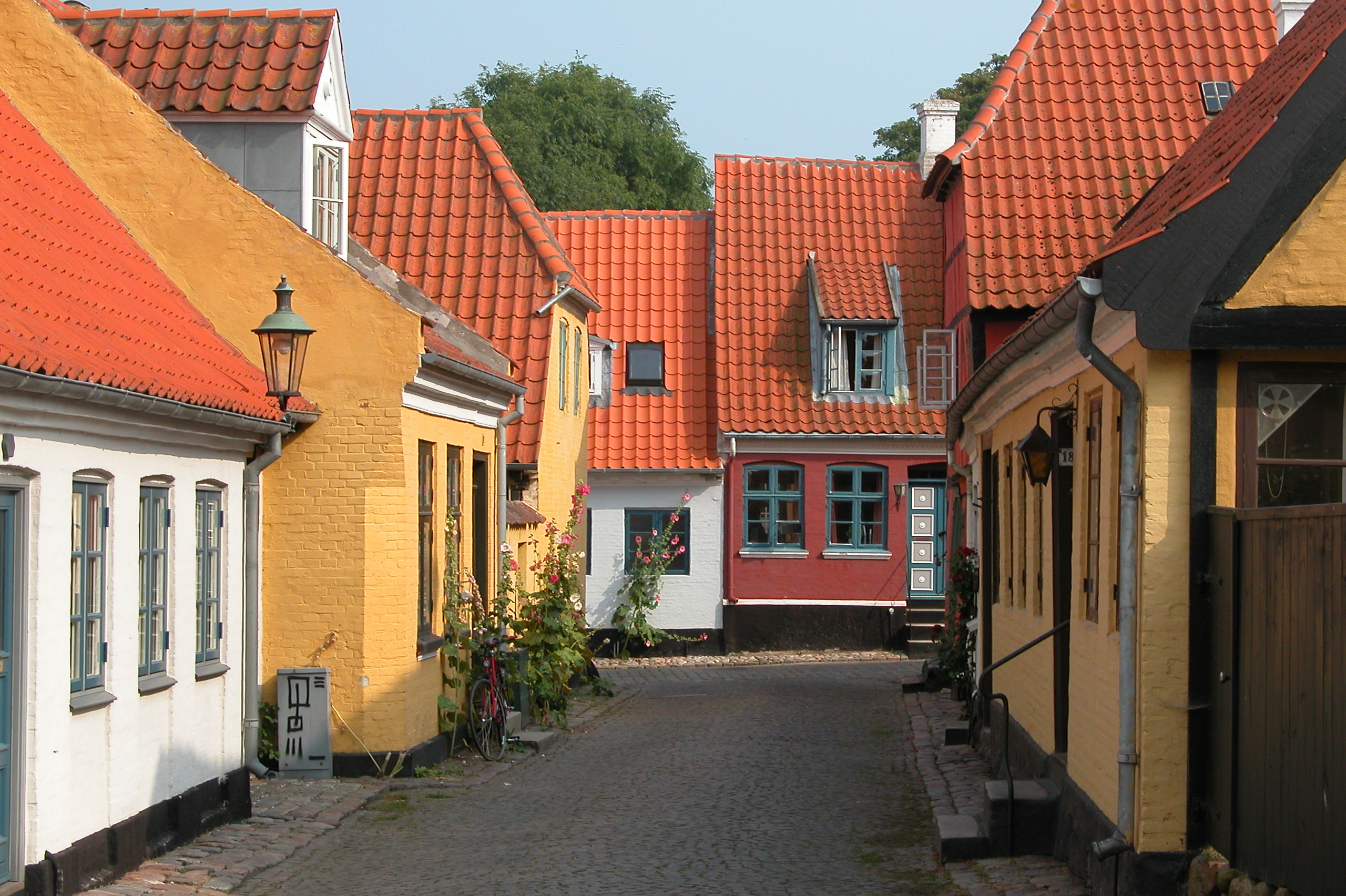
"Gyden" in Ærøskøbing

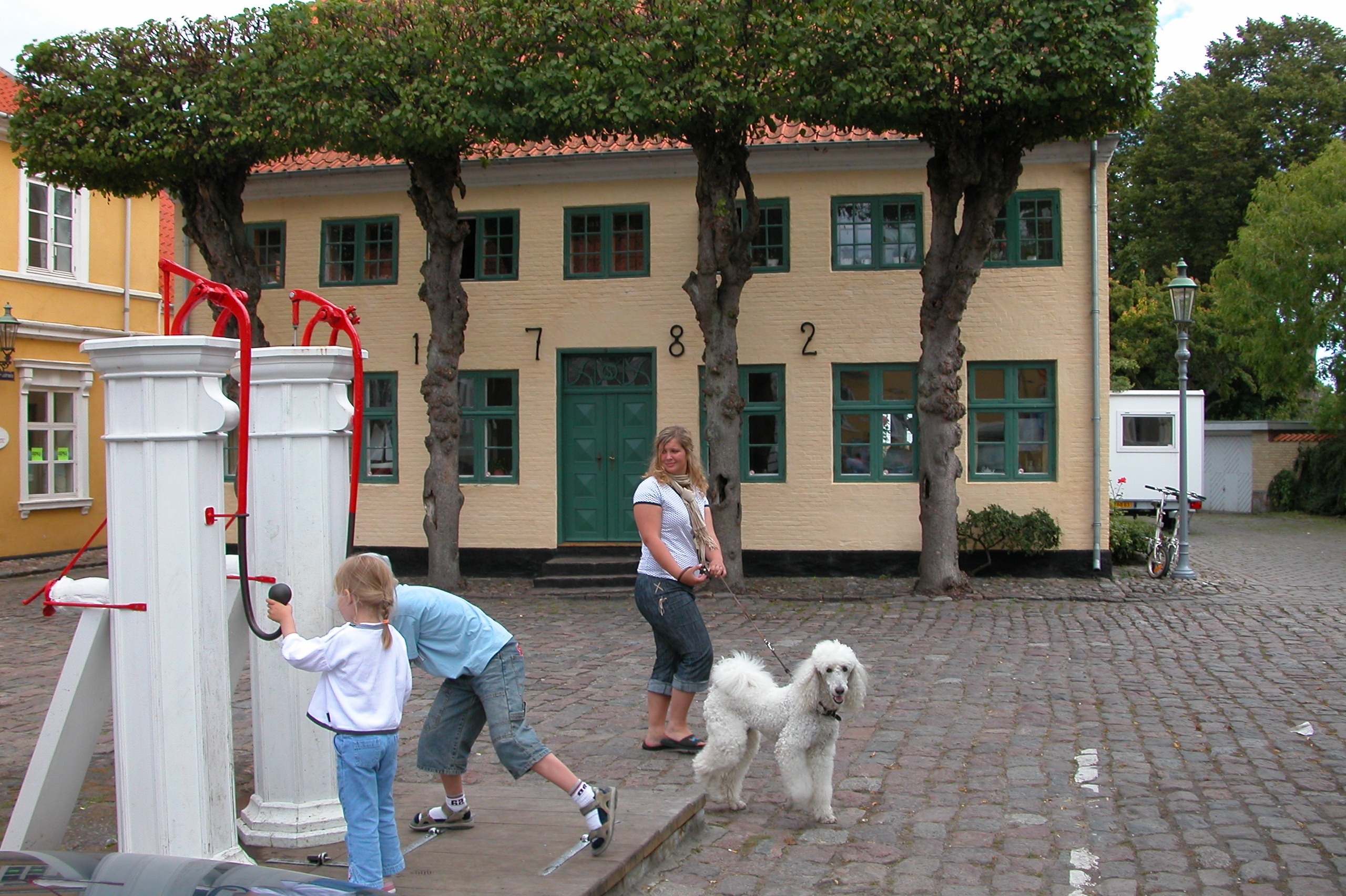
"Torvet" or town square in Ærøskøbing

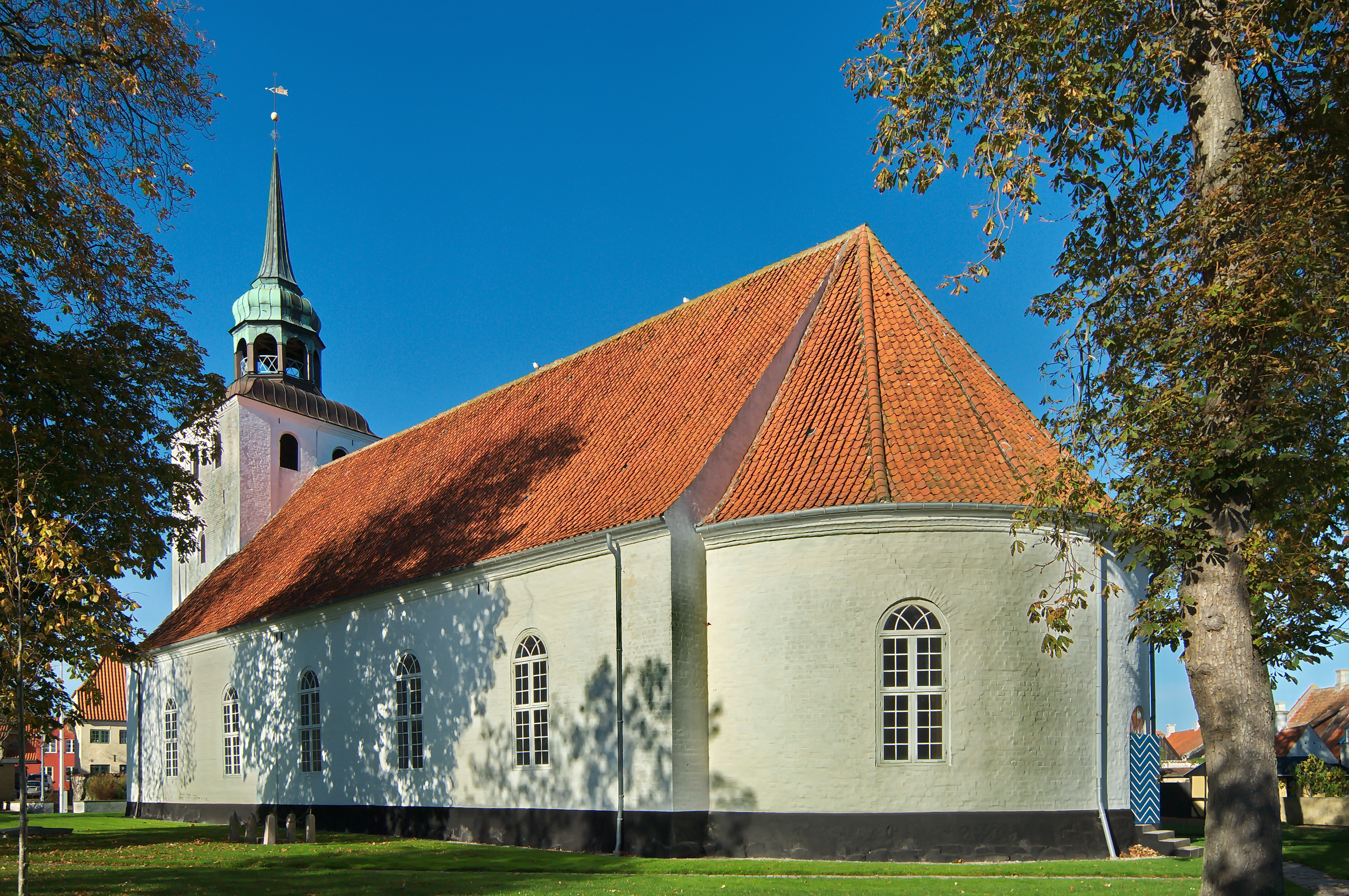
The church of Ærøskøbing

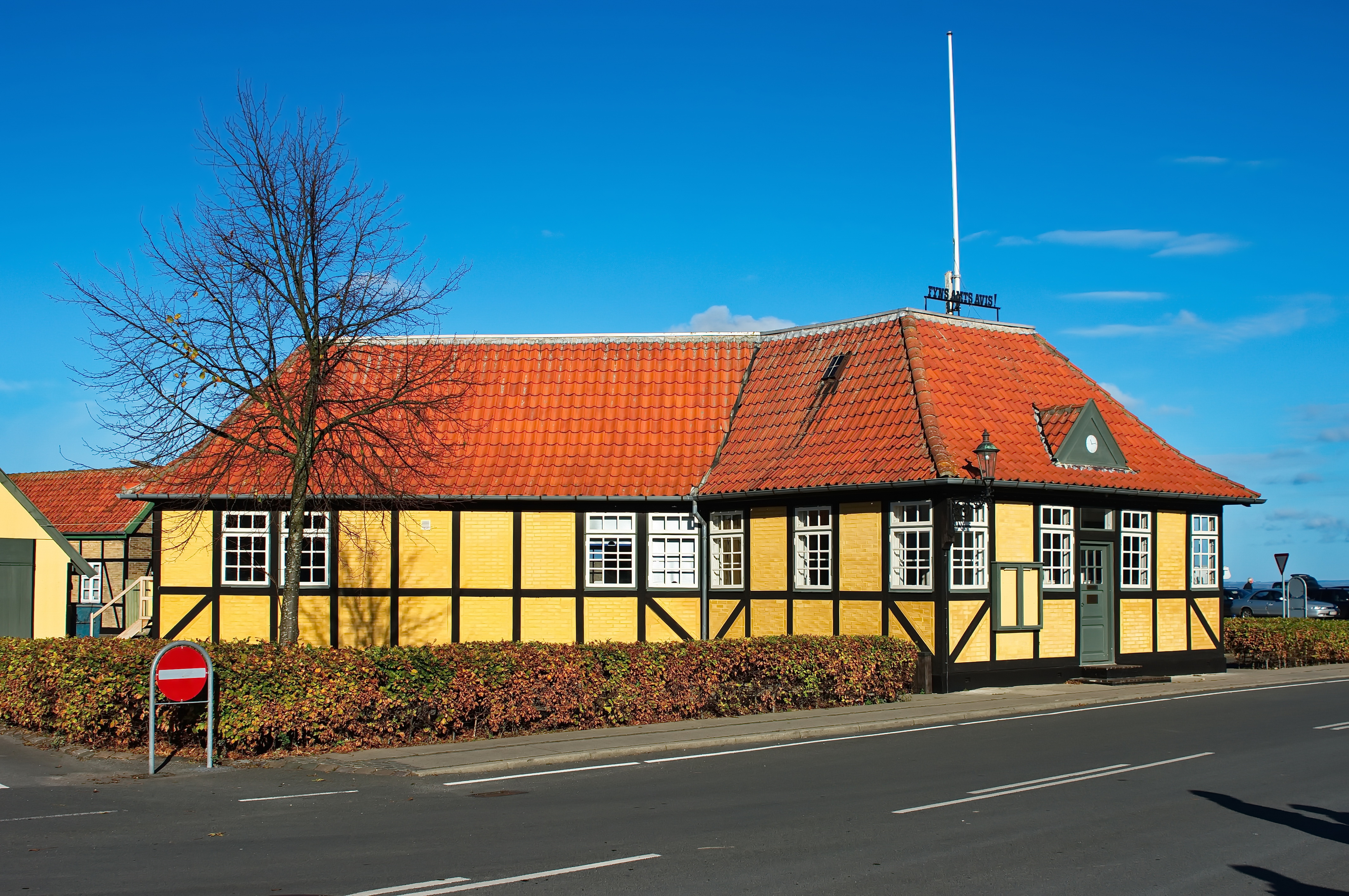
Official building in the harbour

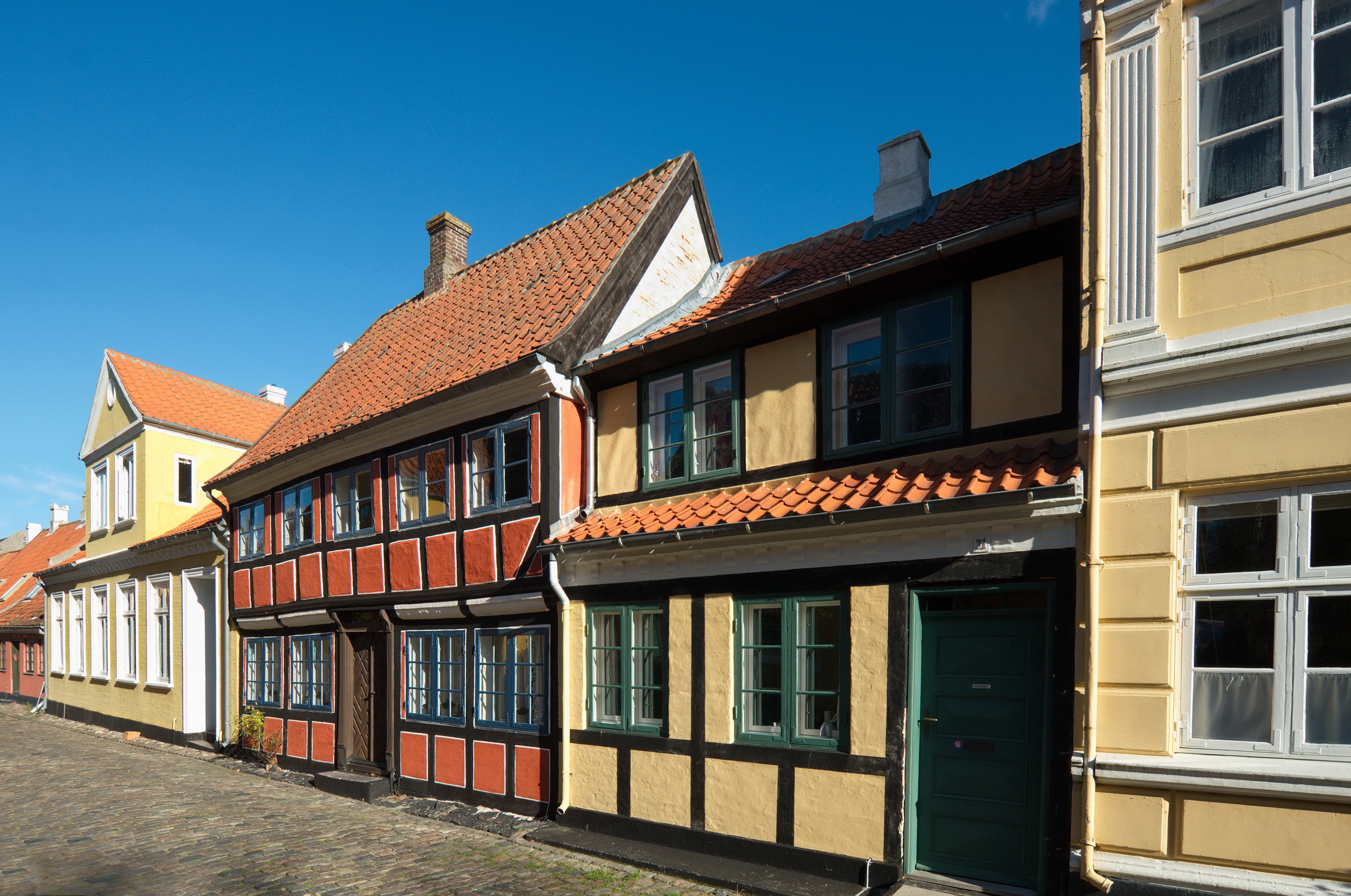
Street with timber framework

== Twin towns – Sister cities ==
Ærøskøbing is twinned with:

- Eksjö, Sweden
