= Grindstone Creek (Hinkson Creek tributary) =

Stream in the U.S. state of Missouri

Grindstone Creek is a stream in Boone County in the U.S. state of Missouri. It is a tributary of Hinkson Creek.

The stream headwaters arise at 38°55′44″N 92°17′32″W at the confluence of the North and South Forks just east of US Route 63 adjacent to the southeast side of Columbia. The stream meanders approximately 1.5 miles to its confluence with Hinkson Creek, just south of the University of Missouri campus at 38°55′40″N 92°19′19″W.

Grindstone Creek was named for the deposits of rock along its course which were the source of grindstones. Grindstone Parkway, a major road in Columbia, Missouri, is named after the creek.

== See also ==
- List of rivers of Missouri
