= Calcutta (1874 ship) =

Wrecked Canadian sailing ship

History

Canada
- Name: Calcutta
- Namesake: Calcutta
- Owner: James Ross (Quebec merchant)
- Port of registry: Quebec
- Builder: Charland, Pointe de Lévy
- Launched: 1874
- Fate: Wrecked 8 November 1875

General characteristics
- Tonnage: 1,454 GRT, or 1,448 GRT; 1,427 NRT, or 1,428 NRT
- Length: 209 ft 0 in (63.7 m)
- Beam: 40 ft 1 in (12.2 m)
- Depth: 21 ft 4 in (6.5 m)

Calcutta was a wooden three-masted sailing ship launched in Quebec in 1874. She wrecked on the north side of Grindstone Island in the Magdalen Islands, Quebec, on 8 November 1875.

Calcutta first appeared in Lloyd's Register (LR) in 1874.

Year	Master	Owner	Home port	Source
1874	W.Fullerton	J.G.Ross	Quebec	LR

Calcutta left Quebec on 4 November 1875, bound for Liverpool. Four days later, in poor visibility, a strong current caused her to strike a rock. The crew and a lady passenger took to a boat, against the captain's orders. The boat overturned, drowning them. The captain and four crew members stayed with the ship and were later saved. Twenty-three people had lost their lives. Calcutta, valued at $50,000, was a total loss, as was her cargo, valued at $20,000.
