= Grindstone Butte =

Summit in South Dakota, United States

Coordinates: 44°11′53″N 101°47′56″W

Grindstone Butte is a summit in Haakon County, South Dakota, in the United States. With an elevation of 2,595 feet (791 m), Grindstone Butte is the 417th highest summit in the state of South Dakota.

Grindstone Butte's name comes from the Native Americans of the area, who collected their grindstones from this summit.

The nearby Grindstone Creek takes its name from Grindstone Butte.
