= Grindstone Island (Magdalen Islands) =

Island in Quebec, Canada

Coordinates: 47°22′49″N 61°54′33″W

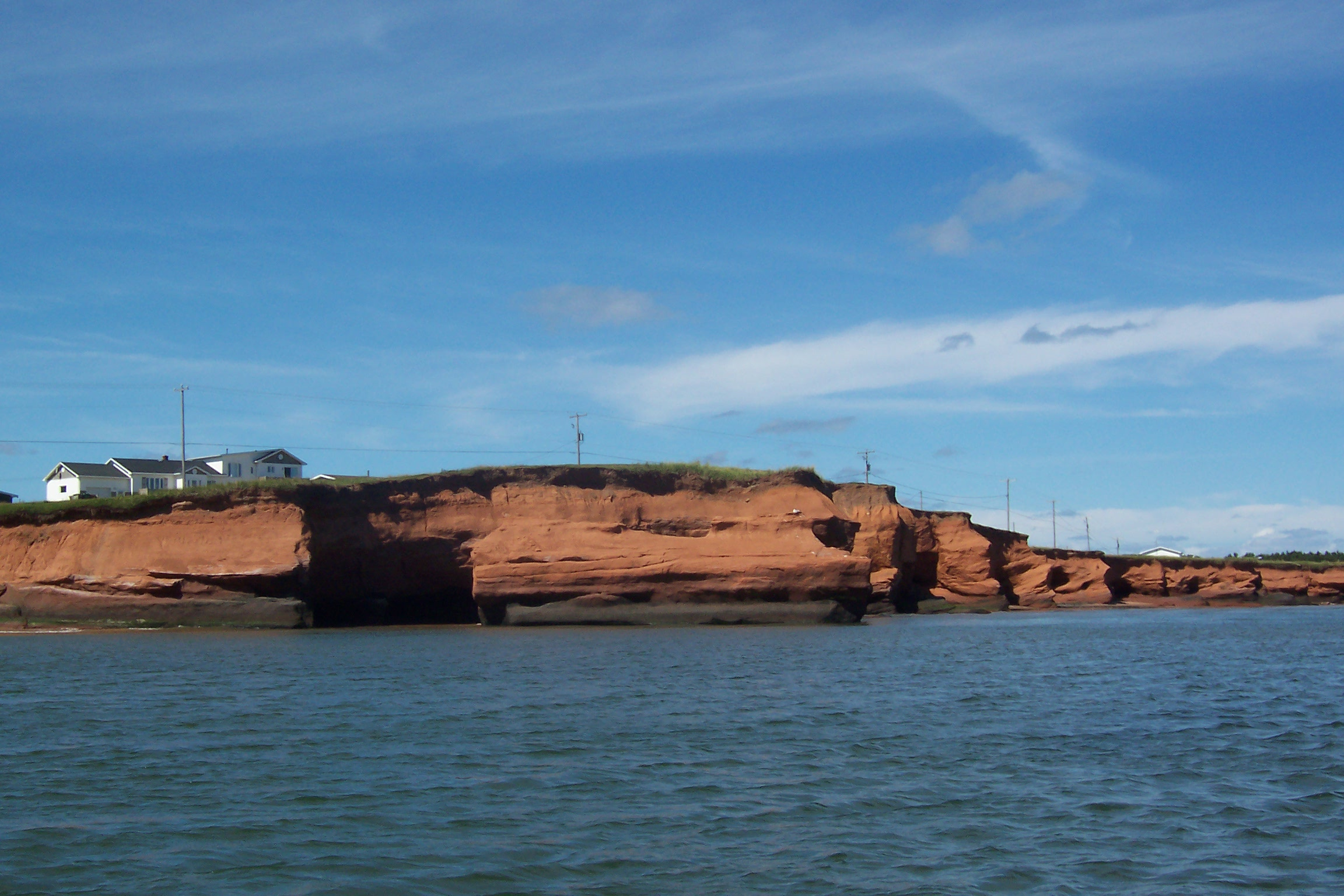
A view of the red cliffs of Île du Cap aux Meules.

Grindstone Island (French: Île du Cap aux Meules, pronounced [il dy kap o møl]) is located in the Gulf of St. Lawrence. The island is one of the Magdalen Islands of Quebec, Canada. The island is the second-largest island by area of the Magdalen Islands (les Îles de la Madeleine). The French name is official but rarely used in English.

Grindstone Island is the most important island of the archipelago. It has the hospital and other public services and is the port of arrival for tourists. The port is the departure point for fishing and touring other islands such as Entry Island. The island is divided into three parts: Cap-aux-Meules, Fatima, and Étang-du-Nord.
