= Italian destroyer Garibaldino =

Italian Soldato-class destroyer

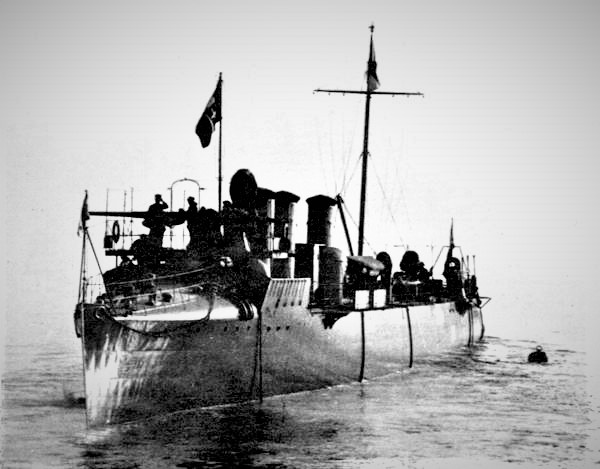
- Garibaldino on maneuvers.

History

Italy
- Name: Garibaldino
- Namesake: Alternative term for a "Redshirt," a volunteer soldier who followed the Italian patriot Giuseppe Garibaldi during his campaigns
- Builder: Gio. Ansaldo & C., Genoa, Kingdom of Italy
- Laid down: 23 October 1905
- Launched: 12 February 1910
- Completed: 1 June 1910
- Commissioned: June 1910
- Fate: Sunk in collision 16 July 1918

General characteristics
- Displacement: 395–424 long tons (401–431 t)
- Length: 64.4 m (211 ft 3 in) wl; 65.0 m (213 ft 3 in) oa
- Beam: 6.1 m (20 ft 0 in)
- Draught: 2.1 m (6 ft 11 in)
- Propulsion: 2 × Vertical triple-expansion steam engines; 3× Thornycroft boilers; 6,000 ihp (4,474 kW); As built: 95 t (93 long tons; 105 short tons) coal; Later: 65 t (64 long tons; 72 short tons) fuel oil
- Speed: 28.5 knots (52.8 km/h; 32.8 mph)
- Complement: 55
- Armament: 4× 76 mm (3 in)/40 guns; 3× 450 mm (17.7 in) torpedo tubes; 10 mines

Garibaldino (an alternative term for "Redshirt") was a Soldato-class ("Soldier"-class) destroyer of the Italian Regia Marina (Royal Navy). Commissioned in 1910, she served in the Italo-Turkish War and World War I. During the latter conflict she sank after a collision in 1918.

== Design ==
Garibaldino was powered by two sets of triple expansion steam engines fed by three Thornycroft water-tube boilers, producing an estimated 6,000 indicated horsepower (4,474 kW) and driving two propeller shafts. As built, she could reach a maximum speed of 28.5 knots (52.8 km/h; 32.8 mph). Originally, she had a fuel capacity of 95 tonnes (93 long tons) of coal, giving her a range of 1,500 nautical miles (2,800 km; 1,700 mi) at 12 knots (22 km/h; 14 mph) and 400 nautical miles (740 km; 460 mi) at 23.5 knots (43.5 km/h; 27.0 mph); she later was converted to burn fuel oil, with a fuel capacity of 65 tonnes (64 long tons) of oil. She was fitted with four 76-millimetre (3 in)/40 calibre guns and three 450-millimetre (17.7 in) torpedo tubes.

== Construction and commissioning ==
Garibaldino was laid down on 23 October 1905 at the Gio. Ansaldo & C. shipyard in Genoa, Italy. She was launched on 12 February 1910 and completed on 1 June 1910. She was commissioned in June 1910.

== Service history ==
=== Italo-Turkish War ===
The Italo-Turkish War began on 29 September 1911 with the Kingdom of Italy′s declaration of war on the Ottoman Empire. At the time, Garibaldino was part of the 2nd Squadron's 4th Destroyer Division along with her sister ships Bersagliere, Granatiere, and Lanciere. That day, she became the first ship to enter the port of Tripoli on the coast of Ottoman Tripolitania, where she demanded the port's surrender. Covered by the torpedo cruiser Coatit, she and Lanciere also conducted a close reconnaissance on 29 September of Argub beach, east of Tripoli, where the Italians expected to land troops for the seizure of Tripoli. By 30 September 1911, she was participating along with Coatit, Lanciere, the battleships Napoli and Roma, the armored cruisers Francesco Ferruccio, Giuseppe Garibaldi, and Varese, and the destroyers Euro, Freccia, Ostro, and Strale in a blockade of Tripoli.

In January 1912 Garibaldino, her sister ship Artigliere, and the protected cruiser Piemonte deployed to the Red Sea to search for Ottoman ships along the coast. On 7 January 1912 Artigliere came across a large group of Ottoman ships – the gunboats Ayintag (or Antep), Bafra, Gökçedağ, Kastamonu, Ordu, and Refahiye, the armed tug Muha, and the armed steam yacht Şipka (formerly Fuad, Fauwette, or Fouvette) — in the harbor at Kunfuda on the coast of the Arabian Peninsula. The Ottoman vessels moved to attack Artigliere, and Garibaldino and Piemonte rushed to her aid. The ensuing clash, the Battle of Kunfuda Bay, lasted for three hours. Opening fire at a range of 4,500 metres (4,900 yd), the Italians sank three of the gunboats and forced the other three to beach themselves to avoid sinking, their crews fleeing after reaching shore. Sources do not mention the fate of Muha. On 8 January, the Italian ships returned and put ashore landing parties which completed the destruction of the beached gunboats after salvaging guns and trophies from them. The ships then bombarded Kunfuda and captured four Arab dhows. After the Ottoman troops in the area fled, a landing party from Piemonte occupied the town. Sources are unclear as to whether Şipka sank or remained afloat during the events of 7–8 January, but agree that the Italians seized her as a prize, towed her to Massawa, and later took her to Italy, where she was incorporated into the Regia Marina as the gunboat Cunfuda.

In June 1912 Garibaldino departed the Red Sea and returned to Italy. The war ended on 18 October 1912 in an Italian victory.

=== World War I ===
World War I broke out in 1914, and Italy entered the war on the side of the Allies with its declaration of war on Austria-Hungary on 23 May 1915. At the time, Garibaldino, under the command of Capitano di fregata (Frigate Captain) De Grossi, was part of the 3rd Destroyer Squadron, based at Brindisi, which also included Artigliere, Bersagliere, Lanciere, and their sister ship Corrazziere. On 24 May 1915, the day after Italy's declaration of war, Garibaldino, Lanciere, and their sister ships Alpino, Carabiniere, and Fuciliere conducted a patrol in the upper Adriatic Sea.

On 29 May 1915 Garibaldino, Artigliere, Bersagliere, and Lanciere bombarded the Adria Werke chemical plant in Monfalcone, a production site for poison gases, while Alpino, Corazziere, and their sister ship Pontiere provided support. The ships carried out another bombardment of the Adria Werke on 7 June 1915.

On 23 February 1916, under the command of Capitano di fregata (Frigate Captain) Brescia, Garibaldino, Bersagliere, and Corazziere escorted 12 steamers and two tugs to Durrës (known to the Italians as Durazzo) on the coast of the Principality of Albania.

In October 1916 Garibaldino, her sister ship Ascaro, the destroyers Borea and Nembo, and four torpedo boats provided protection and support to a landing force consisting of Francesco Ferruccio and the steamers Ausonia, Bulgaria, Choising, and Polcevera sent to occupy Sarandë (known to the Italians as Santi Quaranta) in Albania. At 05:15 on 2 October 1916, four platoons of sailors, a unit of miners, and a unit of personnel from Francesco Ferruccio landed on the beach and quickly occupied the area, the 32 members of the Greek garrison at Sarandë having no option other than to retreat after protesting the Italian operation. After disembarking an infantry battalion and a cavalry squadron, the steamers departed at 16:00 on 2 October for Vlorë, where they embarked more troops. On 3 October, Ausonia and Polcevera landed a pack artillery battery and a second cavalry squadron, and on 4 October the operation was completed when Bulgaria and Choising put another infantry battalion and a third cavalry squadron ashore.

On 16 July 1918 Garibaldino sank in the Mediterranean Sea off Villefranche-sur-Mer, France, after a collision with the British naval trawler HMT Cygnet. (Note: Fraccaroli states that Garibaldino collided with the British destroyer HMS Cygnet, and many other sources repeat this. However, HMS Cygnet was serving as a ship's tender in British waters throughout World War I, and so is unlikely to be the ship involved.) She was the only ship of her class lost in the war.
