= Italian ship Bersagliere =

Bersagliere was the name of at least threec ships of the Italian Navy and may refer to:

- Italian destroyer Bersagliere (1906), a Soldato-class destroyer launched in 1906 and discarded in 1923.
- Italian destroyer Bersagliere (1938), a Soldati-class destroyer launched in 1938 and sunk in 1943.
- Italian frigate Bersagliere (F 584), a Soldati-class frigate launched in 1985 and decommissioned in 2018.
