= Italian destroyer Fuciliere =

Fuciliere was the name of at least two ships of the Italian Navy and may refer to:

- Italian destroyer Fuciliere (1909), a Soldato-class destroyer launched in 1909 and discarded in 1932.
- Italian destroyer Fuciliere (1938), a Soldati-class destroyer launched in 1938 and transferred to Russia under the designation Z 20. Stricken about 1958.
