= Italian destroyer Lanciere =

Lanciere was the name of at least three ships of the Italian Navy and may refer to:

- Italian destroyer Lanciere (1907), a Soldato-class destroyer launched in 1907 and discarded in 1923.
- Italian destroyer Lanciere (1938), a Soldati-class destroyer launched in 1938 and foundered in 1942.
- Italian destroyer Lanciere (D 560), a Fletcher-class destroyer launched in 1942 as USS Taylor and transferred to Italy in 1969. She was struck in 1971.
