= Italian ship Granatiere =

Granatiere was the name of at least three ships of the Italian Navy and may refer to:

- Italian destroyer Granatiere (1906), a Soldato-class destroyer launched in 1906 and discarded in 1927.
- Italian destroyer Granatiere (1938), a Soldati-class destroyer launched in 1938 and stricken in 1958.
- Italian frigate Granatiere (F 585), a Soldati-class frigate launched in 1985 and decommissioned in 2015.
