= Italian destroyer Bersagliere (1906) =

Italian Soldato-class destroyer

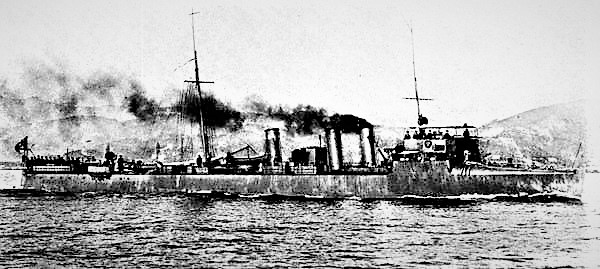

History

Italy
- Name: Bersagliere
- Namesake: A member of the Bersaglieri, Italian infantrymen trained as sharpshooters
- Builder: Gio. Ansaldo & C., Genoa, Kingdom of Italy
- Laid down: 13 July 1905
- Launched: 2 October 1906
- Completed: 13 April 1907
- Commissioned: 5 June 1907
- Stricken: 5 July 1923
- Identification: Pennant number BG
- Fate: Scrapped

General characteristics
- Displacement: 395–424 long tons (401–431 t)
- Length: 64.4 m (211 ft 3 in) wl; 65.0 m (213 ft 3 in) oa
- Beam: 6.1 m (20 ft 0 in)
- Draught: 2.1 m (6 ft 11 in)
- Propulsion: 2 × Vertical triple-expansion steam engines; 3× Thornycroft boilers; 6,000 ihp (4,474 kW); As built: 95 t (93 long tons; 105 short tons) coal; Later: 65 t (64 long tons; 72 short tons) fuel oil
- Speed: 28.5 knots (52.8 km/h; 32.8 mph)
- Complement: 55
- Armament: 4× 76 mm (3 in)/40 guns; 3× 450 mm (17.7 in) torpedo tubes; 10 mines

Bersagliere (a member of the Bersaglieri) was the lead ship of the Soldato-class ("Soldier"-class) destroyers of the Italian Regia Marina ("Royal Navy"). Commissioned in 1907, she served in the Italo-Turkish War and World War I. She was stricken in 1923.

== Design ==
Bersagliere was powered by two sets of triple expansion steam engines fed by three Thornycroft water-tube boilers, producing an estimated 6,000 indicated horsepower (4,474 kW) and driving two propeller shafts. As built, she could reach a maximum speed of 28.5 knots (52.8 km/h; 32.8 mph). Originally, she had a fuel capacity of 95 tonnes (93 long tons) of coal, giving her a range of 1,500 nautical miles (2,800 km; 1,700 mi) at 12 knots (22 km/h; 14 mph) and 400 nautical miles (740 km; 460 mi) at 23.5 knots (43.5 km/h; 27.0 mph); she later was converted to burn fuel oil, with a fuel capacity of 65 tonnes (64 long tons) of oil. She was fitted with four 76-millimetre (3 in)/40 calibre guns and three 450-millimetre (17.7 in) torpedo tubes.

== Construction and commissioning ==
Bersagliere was laid down on 13 July 1905 at the Gio. Ansaldo & C. shipyard in Genoa, Italy. She was launched on 2 October 1906 and completed on 13 August 1907. She was commissioned on 5 June 1907.

== Service history ==
=== 1907–1911 ===
During the summer of 1907, Bersaglieri engaged in crew training. A devastating earthquake in the Strait of Messina and subsequent tsunami struck Messina, Sicily, and Reggio Calabria on the Italian mainland on 28 December 1908. On 30 December 1908 Bersagliere, her sister ship Artigliere, and the battleship Vittorio Emanuele arrived at Messina to assist in rescue operations.

=== Italo-Turkish War ===
The Italo-Turkish War began on 29 September 1911 with the Kingdom of Italy′s declaration of war on the Ottoman Empire. At the time, Bersagliere was based at Taranto as part of the 2nd Squadron's 4th Division along with her sister ships Garibaldino, Granatiere, and Lanciere. During the war, she supported the Italian invasion of Ottoman Libya in the autumn of 1911, then deployed to the Red Sea to reinforce the Italian squadron there. She next operated in the Aegean Sea, returned to the Red Sea, and then served in the Dodecanese. The war ended on 18 October 1912 in an Italian victory.

=== World War I ===
==== 1915 ====
World War I broke out in 1914, and Italy entered the war on the side of the Allies with its declaration of war on Austria-Hungary on 23 May 1915. At the time, Bersagliere, under the command of Capitano di fregata (Frigate Captain) Lubelli, was part of the 3rd Destroyer Squadron, based at Brindisi, which also included Artigliere, Garibaldino, Lanciere, and their sister ship Corazziere. In the predawn hours of 24 May 1915, Bersagliere and Corazziere entered the waters off Grado to support the raid on Porto Buso, an incursion by the destroyer Zeffiro against the Austro-Hungarian border outpost on the island of Porto Buso in the Grado Lagoon, a part of the larger Marano Lagoon. While Zeffiro attacked the island, Bersagliere and Corazziere guarded against interference by Austro-Hungarian Navy ships and bombarded Austro-Hungarian positions.

On 29 May 1915 Artigliere, Bersagliere, Garibaldino, and Lanciere bombarded the Adria Werke chemical plant in Monfalcone, a production site for poison gases, while Corazziere and their sister ships Alpino and Pontiere provided support. The ships carried out another bombardment of the Adria Werke on 7 June 1915.

On 3 July 1915 Bersagliere was assigned to the 3rd Gruppo (Group) of the 4th Naval Division (or "Cagni" Division). She took part in coastal defense operations and the escort of convoys to the Principality of Albania in 1915–1916. At 01:00 on 6 July 1915 she got underway from Venice with the rest of her squadron and steamed to Porto Buso, then turned in the direction of Savudrija Point (known to the Italians as Punta Salvore) on the northern end of Istria on the coast of Austria-Hungary to conduct an offensive reconnaissance sweep. The sweep yielded no results, and the ships steamed back toward Venice. At 04:30 they were about 30 nautical miles (56 km; 35 mi) east of Chioggia, where they were to rendezvous with the armored cruiser Amalfi and another destroyer squadron led by the destroyer Impavido. Plans called for the combined force to sweep the Gulf of Venice in a search for Austro-Hungarian ships. While heading toward the rendezvous, however, Amalfi was torpedoed by the Austro-Hungarian Navy submarine U-26 and sank in ten minutes.

==== 1916–1918 ====
On 23 February 1916, under the command of Capitano di frgatta (Frigate Captain) Del Buono, Bersagliere joined Corazziere and Garibaldino in escorting 12 steamers and two tugs to Durrës (known to the Italians as Durazzo) on the coast of Albania. On 24 February, Bersagliere, the auxiliary cruisers Città di Catania and Città di Siracusa, and the destroyers Ardito and Irrequieto began to bombard advancing Austro-Hungarian troops in Albania who were about to occupy Durrës. In the following days they also bombarded Austro-Hungarian artillery positions on the mountain Sasso Bianco in the Dolomites near Durrës.

In 1917, Bersagliere deployed to the Tyrrhenian Sea, where she operated into 1918. On 8 January 1918 she took over escort duty from Lanciere at Savona, Italy, for the large passenger steamers San Giovanni and San Guglielmo, which had left Genoa that day bound for New York City. The ships were instructed to hug the Italian coast, and were in the Gulf of Genoa only 800 metres (870 yd) off Loano when the Imperial German Navy submarine U-63 attacked the convoy, torpedoing San Guglielmo and sinking her at 44°07′N 008°18′E.

Later in 1918, Bersagliere operated in the Dodecanese. By late October 1918, Austria-Hungary had effectively disintegrated, and the Armistice of Villa Giusti, signed on 3 November 1918, went into effect on 4 November 1918 and brought hostilities between Austria-Hungary and the Allies to an end. World War I ended a week later with an armistice between the Allies and the German Empire on 11 November 1918.

=== Post-World War I ===
After World War I, Bersagliere operated on patrol duty and as a training ship. She was reclassified as a torpedo boat on 1 July 1921. She was placed in reserve and decommissioned in 1923. Stricken from the naval register on 5 July 1923 and subsequently scrapped.
