= Italian destroyer Granatiere (1906) =

Italian Soldato-class destroyer

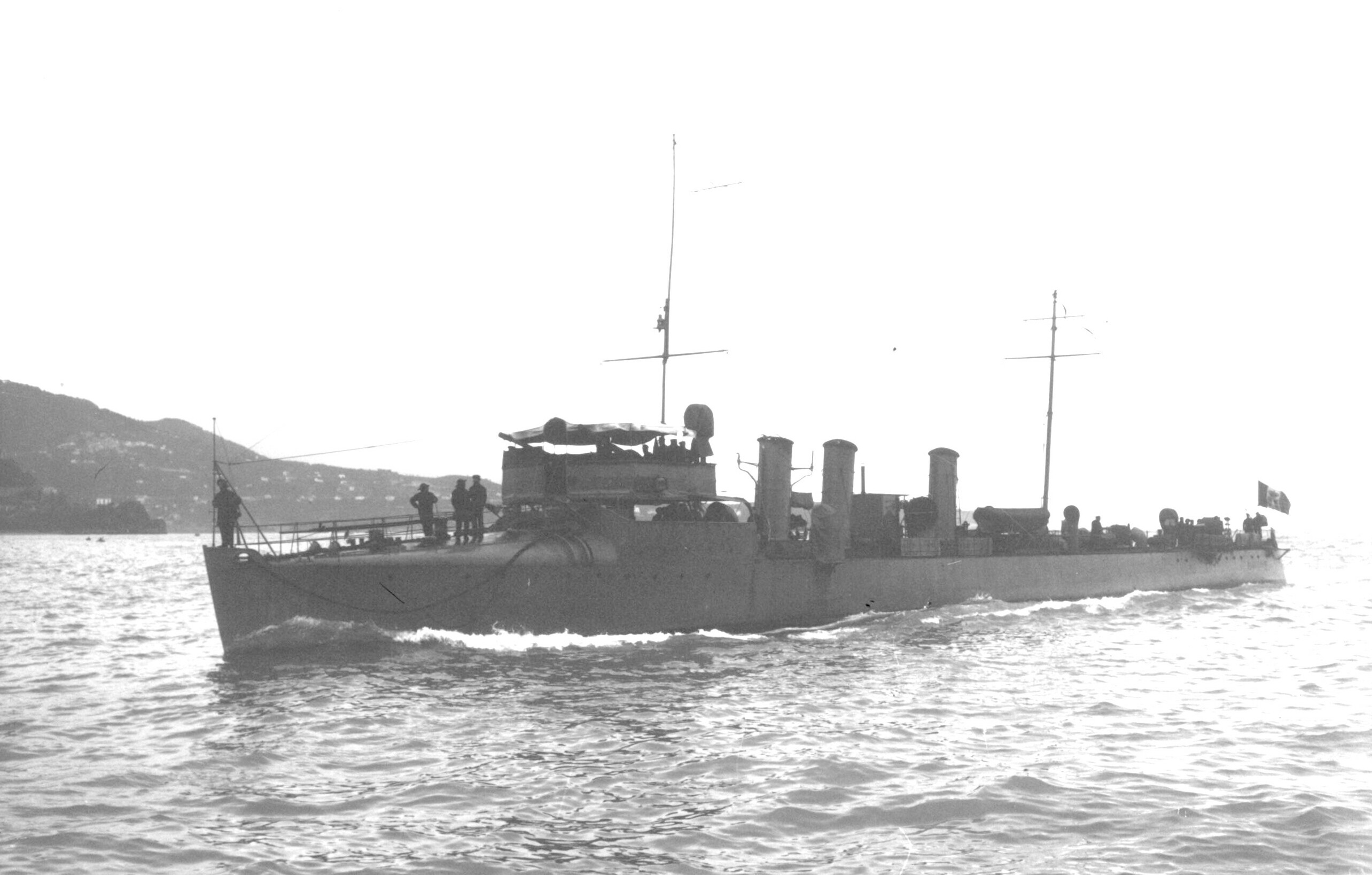
- Granatiere off Monaco on 4 April 1910.

History

Italy
- Name: Granatiere
- Namesake: Grenadier, a soldier who specializes in fighting in the vanguard of assaults
- Builder: Gio. Ansaldo & C., Genoa, Kingdom of Italy
- Laid down: 24 July 1905
- Launched: 27 October 1906
- Completed: 18 April 1907
- Commissioned: 5 June 1907
- Stricken: 3 November 1927
- Identification: Pennant number GR
- Fate: Scrapped

General characteristics
- Displacement: 395–424 long tons (401–431 t)
- Length: 64.4 m (211 ft 3 in) wl; 65.0 m (213 ft 3 in) oa
- Beam: 6.1 m (20 ft 0 in)
- Draught: 2.1 m (6 ft 11 in)
- Propulsion: 2 × Vertical triple-expansion steam engines; 3× Thornycroft boilers; 6,000 ihp (4,474 kW); As built: 95 t (93 long tons; 105 short tons) coal; Later: 65 t (64 long tons; 72 short tons) fuel oil
- Speed: 28.5 knots (52.8 km/h; 32.8 mph)
- Complement: 55
- Armament: 4× 76 mm (3 in)/40 guns; 3× 450 mm (17.7 in) torpedo tubes; 10 mines

Granatiere ("Grenadier") was a Soldato-class ("Soldier"-class) destroyer of the Italian Regia Marina ("Royal Navy"). Commissioned in 1907, she served in the Italo-Turkish War and World War I. She was stricken in 1927.

== Design ==
Granatiere was powered by two sets of triple expansion steam engines fed by three Thornycroft water-tube boilers, producing an estimated 6,000 indicated horsepower (4,474 kW) and driving two propeller shafts. As built, she could reach a maximum speed of 28.5 knots (52.8 km/h; 32.8 mph). Originally, she had a fuel capacity of 95 tonnes (93 long tons) of coal, giving her a range of 1,500 nautical miles (2,800 km; 1,700 mi) at 12 knots (22 km/h; 14 mph) and 400 nautical miles (740 km; 460 mi) at 23.5 knots (43.5 km/h; 27.0 mph); she later was converted to burn fuel oil, with a fuel capacity of 65 tonnes (64 long tons) of oil. She was fitted with four 76-millimetre (3 in)/40 calibre guns and three 450-millimetre (17.7 in) torpedo tubes.

== Construction and commissioning ==
Granatiere was laid down on 24 July 1905 at the Gio. Ansaldo & C. shipyard in Genoa, Italy. She was launched on 27 October 1906 and completed on 18 April 1907. She was commissioned on 5 June 1907.

== Service history ==
=== 1907–1911 ===
Assigned to the 3rd Destroyer Squadron in the Department of the Upper Tyrrhenian Sea, Granatiere spent an initial training period in the waters of La Spezia. On 13 May 1908, she steamed up the Tiber to Rome to receive a battle flag presented to her by the Italian Royal Army's Brigade "Granatieri di Sardegna" at the Port of Ripa Grande in the presence of King Victor Emmanuel III.

A devastating earthquake in the Strait of Messina and subsequent tsunami struck Messina, Sicily, and Reggio Calabria on the Italian mainland on 28 December 1908. On 1 January 1909 Granatiere and the auxiliary ship Volta arrived at Messina to assist in rescue operations. In 1909 she operated in the Middle East to defend Italians from anti-Christian violence.

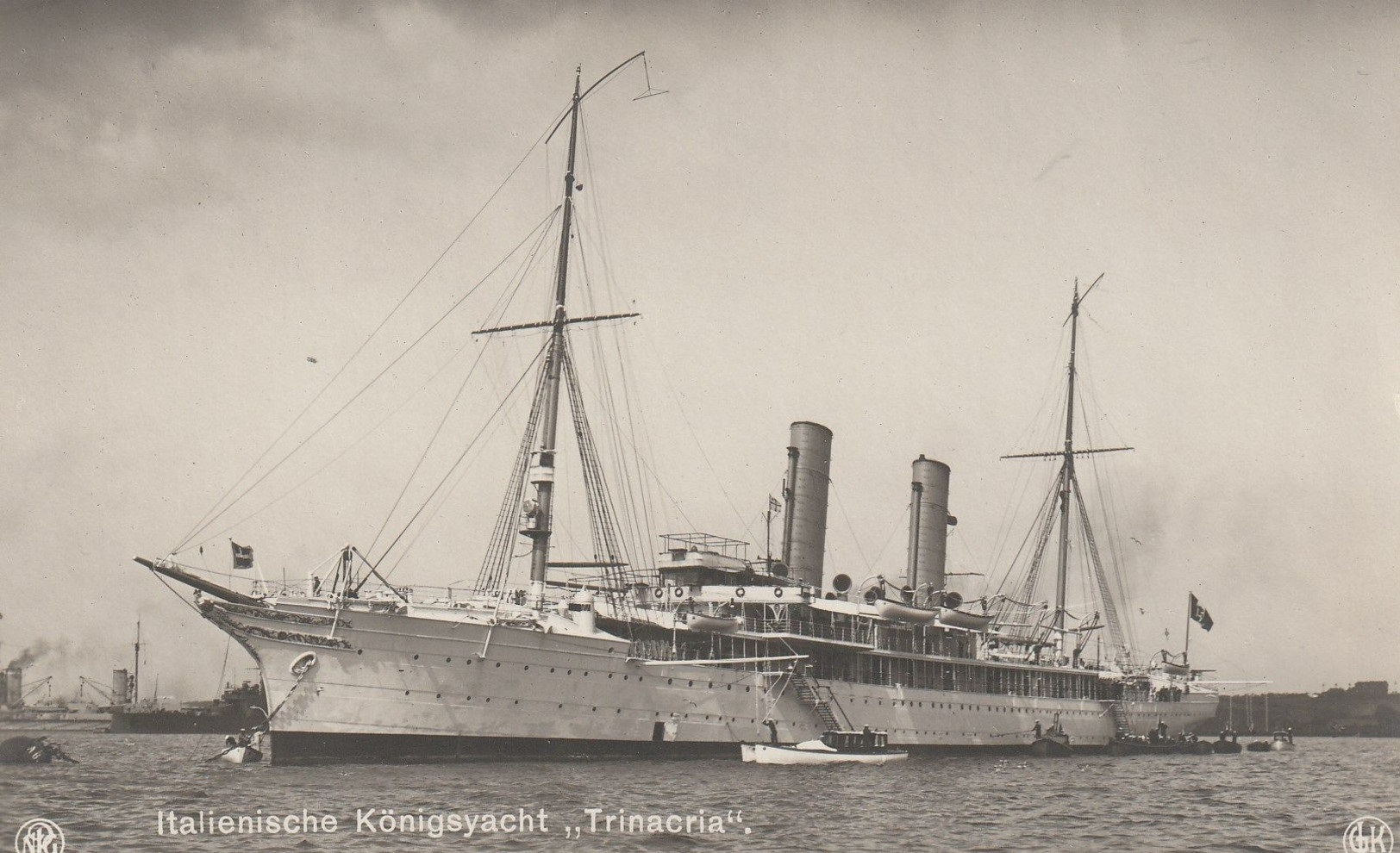
The Italian Royal Yacht Trinacria

In 1910, Granatiere visited Monaco to attend the dedication of the Oceanographic Museum of Monaco. During 1910 she also escorted the Italian royal yacht Trinacria to Sicily and Sardinia.

=== Italo-Turkish War ===
The Italo-Turkish War began on 29 September 1911 with the Kingdom of Italy′s declaration of war on the Ottoman Empire. At the time, Granatiere was part of the 2nd Squadron's 4th Destroyer Division along with her sister ships Bersagliere, Garibaldino, and Lanciere. She supported Italian operations off Ottoman Libya and in the Red Sea in 1911, and in 1912 operated in the Red Sea, in the Aegean Sea off Anatolia and Greece, and in the Dodecanese. The war ended on 18 October 1912 in an Italian victory.

=== World War I ===
==== 1915 ====
World War I broke out in 1914 — a year in which Granatiere underwent repairs at the Taranto Arsenal — and Italy entered the war on the side of the Allies with its declaration of war on Austria-Hungary on 23 May 1915. At the time, Granatiere, under the command of Capitano di corvetta (Corvette Captain) Landi, was part of the 2nd Destroyer Squadron, based at Taranto, which also included the destroyers Impavido, Insidioso, and Irrequieto. During the war she escorted convoys across the Adriatic Sea from Italy to the Principality of Albania and served on antisubmarine duty in the northern Tyrrhenian Sea and southern Adriatic, escorting ships on routes between Gibraltar, Marseille, Malta, and Sicily. On 1 December 1917 she recovered 160 survivors of the auxiliary cruiser Città di Sassari, torpedoed and sunk in the Gulf of Genoa off Borghetto Santo Spirito, Italy, at 44°08′N 008°14′E by the Imperial German Navy submarine U-65.

By late October 1918, Austria-Hungary had effectively disintegrated, and the Armistice of Villa Giusti, signed on 3 November 1918, went into effect on 4 November 1918 and brought hostilities between Austria-Hungary and the Allies to an end. World War I ended a week later with an armistice between the Allies and the German Empire on 11 November 1918.

=== Post-World War I ===
After World War I, Granatiere was reclassified as a torpedo boat on 1 July 1921. Between 1921 and 1924 she was deployed in the Italian Dodecanese, stationed at Rhodes as the flagship of the local senior naval commander. She then served as a training ship at the Mechanics School of Venice from 1925 to 1927.

Granatiere was stricken from the naval register on 3 November 1927. She subsequently was scrapped.
