= Italian destroyer Carabiniere (1909) =

Italian Soldato-class destroyer

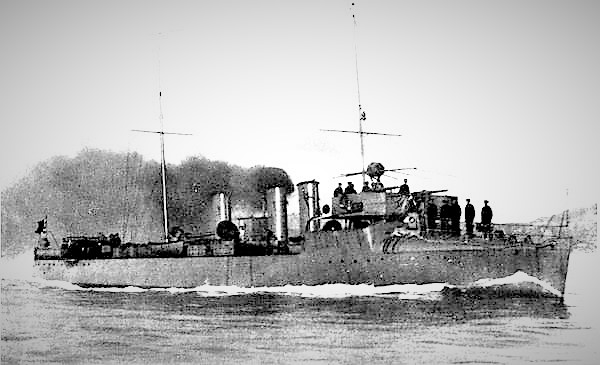

History

Italy
- Name: Carabiniere
- Namesake: Carabinier, a soldier armed with a carbine
- Builder: Gio. Ansaldo & C., Genoa, Kingdom of Italy
- Laid down: 7 November 1905
- Launched: 12 October 1909
- Completed: 26 January 1910
- Commissioned: 1910
- Reclassified: Torpedo boat 1 July 1921
- Stricken: 7 May 1925
- Fate: Discarded 7 May 1925; Scrapped
- Motto: 1910–1914: Usi obbedir tacendo e tacendo morir; 'Accustomed to obey in silence and to die in silence'; From 1914: Nei secoli fedele; 'Forever faithful'

General characteristics
- Class & type: Soldato-class destroyer
- Displacement: 395–415 long tons (401–422 t)
- Length: 65 m (213 ft 3 in) wl; 65.0 m (213 ft 3 in) oa
- Beam: 6.1 m (20 ft 0 in)
- Draught: 2.1 m (6 ft 11 in)
- Propulsion: 2 × Vertical triple-expansion steam engines; 3× Thornycroft water-tube boilers; 6,000 ihp (4,474 kW); 65 t (72 tons) fuel oil
- Speed: 28.5 knots (52.8 km/h; 32.8 mph)
- Range: 1,600 nmi (3,000 km; 1,800 mi) at 12 knots (22 km/h; 14 mph)
- Complement: 50
- Armament: 4 × 76 mm (3 in)/40 guns; 3 × 450 mm (17.7 in) torpedo tubes

Carabinere ("Carabinier") was a Soldato-class ("Soldier"-class) destroyer of the Italian Regia Marina (Royal Navy). Commissioned in 1910, she served in the Italo-Turkish War and World War I. Reclassified as a torpedo boat in 1921, she was stricken in 1925.

== Design ==
Carabiniere was powered by two sets of triple expansion steam engines fed by three Thornycroft water-tube boilers, producing an estimated 6,000 indicated horsepower (4,474 kW) and driving two propeller shafts. As built, she could reach a maximum speed of 28.5 knots (52.8 km/h; 32.8 mph). Her fuel capacity of 65 tonnes (64 long tons) of fuel oil gave her a range of 1,600 nautical miles (3,000 km; 1,800 mi) at 12 knots (22 km/h; 14 mph). She was fitted with four 76-millimetre (3 in)/40 calibre guns and three 450-millimetre (17.7 in) torpedo tubes.

== Construction and commissioning ==
Carabiniere was laid down on 7 November 1905 at the Gio. Ansaldo & C. shipyard in Genoa, Italy. She was launched on 12 October 1909 and completed on 26 January 1910. She was commissioned in 1910.

== Motto ==
The ship's motto initially was what then also was the motto of Italy's gendarmerie, the Carabinieri: Usi obbedir tacendo e tacendo morir ("[They are] accustomed to obey in silence and to die in silence"), taken from the 1861 short poem La rassegna di Novara ("The Review of Novara") by Costantino Nigra. In 1914, on the occasion of the 100th anniversary of the Carabinieri, the Carabinieri adopted the new motto Nei secoli fedele ("Forever faithful"). The destroyer then adopted the new motto as well, and it went on to become the motto of subsequent Regia Marina ("Royal Navy") and Marina Militare (Italian Navy) ships named Carabiniere.

== Service history ==
=== Italo-Turkish War ===
The Italo-Turkish War began on 29 September 1911 with the Kingdom of Italy′s declaration of war on the Ottoman Empire. At the time, Carabiniere was part of the 2nd Squadron's 3rd Destroyer Division along with her sister ships Alpino, Fuciliere, and Pontiere. On the afternoon of 29 September Carabinieri took part in one of the first clashes of the war, the Battle of Preveza, when she, along with Alpino, the destroyers Artigliere and Zeffiro, and the torpedo boat Spica engaged the Ottoman Navy torpedo boats Antalya and Tokad as they attempted to leave the port of Preveza on what then was the Ionian Sea coast of the Ottoman Empire. The Italian ships attacked the two torpedo boats at 14:00, and Artigliere seriously damaged Tokad and pursued her into the anchorage as she attempted to return to Preveza. Meanwhile, Carabiniere, Alpino, Spiga, and Zeffiro surrounded Antalya. Hit repeatedly, seriously damaged, and on fire, with four members of her crew killed in action and numerous other crewmen wounded, Antalya struck her colors and ran herself aground on a nearby beach. As Antalya′s crew abandoned ship, members of Alpino′s crew boarded and captured her and removed her flag and her only usable gun, after which Alpino finished her off with gunfire. Carabiniere, Alpino, Spiga, and Zeffiro then joined Artigliere in the harbor and sank Tokad and an Ottoman gunboat. As the Italian ships departed, the crew of the Greek steamer Marte cheered them.

In a 1912 magazine article and a 1913 book based on contemporary sources, United States Navy Commodore W. H. Beehler offers a different version of the events of 29 September 1911. According to Beehler, the Italian ships sighted Antalya and Tokad in the Ionian Sea between Corfu and Preveza, steering north-northwestward, at either 15:00 or 16:00. The Italians opened fire, and the Ottoman ships returned fire only feebly. Tokad steamed northward chased by three Italian destroyers, while Antalya headed south with two Italian destroyers in pursuit. Hit 15 times and on fire, Tokad beached herself near Nicopolis and was totally destroyed, with her commanding officer and eight of her sailors either killed by the Italian gunfire or drowned. Meanwhile, Antalya reached Preveza undamaged. The Italian destroyers were undamaged and fired 100 76-millimetre rounds during the engagement.

On 5 October 1911, a motorboat from Artigliere that had been searching an Austro-Hungarian mail steamer in the harbor at Shëngjin (known to the Italians as San Giovanni de Medua) on the coast of Albania came under fire from field guns in an earthwork. Artigliere responded by bombarding the earthwork, silencing its guns and damaging a number of buildings in the city of Shëngjin. Artigliere, which suffered minor damage before silencing the earthwork, ceased fire after 45 minutes when she ran out of ammunition. Meanwhile, Carabiniere arrived on the scene and also opened fire, bombarding the earthwork for 20 minutes before departing.

The war ended on 18 October 1912 in an Italian victory.

=== World War I ===
World War I broke out in 1914, and Italy entered the war on the side of the Allies with its declaration of war on Austria-Hungary on 23 May 1915. At the time, Carabiniere, under the command of Capitano di fregata (Frigate Captain) V. Piazza, was the flagship of the 4th Destroyer Squadron, based at Brindisi, which also included Alpino, Zeffiro, and the destroyers Ascaro, Fuciliere, and Pontiere. On 24 May 1915, the day after Italy's declaration of war, Carabiniere, Alpino, Fuciliere, and their sister ships Garibaldino and Lanciere conducted a patrol in the upper Adriatic Sea.

On 11 February 1917 Carabiniere — now under the command of an officer named Gais — Alpino, Fuciliere, Pontiere, the torpedo boats 19 OS, 20 OS, 21 OS, and 22 OS, and six French airplanes provided escort and support to a group of two French and three Italian seaplanes as the seaplanes conducted a reconnaissance of the Austro-Hungarian Navy base at Pola.

On the night of 13–14 August 1917 Carabiniere left Venice with Pontiere and the destroyers Animoso, Ardente, Audace, Francesco Stocco, Giovanni Acerbi, Giuseppe Cesare Abba, Giuseppe Sirtori, and Vincenzo Giordano Orsini to intercept an Austro-Hungarian force made up of the destroyers Dinara, Reka, Sharfschutze, Streiter, and Velebit and six torpedo boats which had supported an air raid by 32 aircraft against the fortress of Venice which had struck San Giovanni e Paolo Hospital, killing 14 people and injuring around 30 others. Only Vincenzo Giordano Orsini managed to make brief and fleeting contact with the Austro-Hungarian ships before they escaped.

On 24 September 1917 Carabiniere, Pontiere, and Zeffiro got underway from Venice to intervene in a clash between the Italian coastal torpedo boats 9 PN, 10 PN, 11 PN, and 12 PN and four Austro-Hungarian Navy destroyers. The battle ended following the intervention of Italian aircraft, and the Austro-Hungarian destroyers withdrew before the Italian destroyers could engage them.

By late October 1918, Austria-Hungary had effectively disintegrated, and the Armistice of Villa Giusti, signed on 3 November 1918, went into effect on 4 November 1918 and brought hostilities between Austria-Hungary and the Allies to an end. World War I ended a week later with an armistice between the Allies and the German Empire on 11 November 1918.

=== Post-World War I ===
After World War I, Carabiniere was stationed for various periods at Split (known to the Italians as Spalato), Trogir (known to the Italians as Traù), Dubrovnik (known to the Italians as Ragusa), and Korčula (known to the Italians as Curzola) because of tensions between Italians and populations in the Kingdom of the Serbs, Croats, and Slovenes (which in 1929 was renamed the Kingdom of Yugoslavia), including the 1918–1920 unrest in Split. Reclassified as a torpedo boat on 1 July 1921, Carabiniere was stricken from the naval register on 7 May 1925, discarded the same day, and subsequently scrapped.

== Bibliography ==
- Beehler, W. H. (1913). The History of the Italian-Turkish War, September 29, 1911 to October 18, 1912 (PDF). Annapolis, Maryland: William H. Beehler. (reprinted from Proceedings of the United States Naval Institute with additions)
- Favre, Franco. La Marina nella Grande Guerra. Le operazioni navali, aeree, subacquee e terrestri in Adriatico (in Italian).
- Fraccaroli, Aldo (1985). "Italy". In Gray, Randal (ed.). Conway's All the World's Fighting Ships 1906–1921. Annapolis: Naval Institute Press. pp. 252–290. ISBN 978-0-87021-907-8.
