= Italian destroyer Pontiere =

Italian Soldato-class destroyer

History

Italy
- Name: Pontiere
- Namesake: Bridgeman, a soldier who specializes in constructing bridges
- Builder: Gio. Ansaldo & C., Genoa, Kingdom of Italy
- Laid down: 18 November 1905
- Launched: 3 January 1910
- Completed: 11 February 1910
- Commissioned: 1910
- Reclassified: Torpedo boat 1 July 1921
- Stricken: 1 July 1929
- Fate: Scrapped

General characteristics
- Class & type: Soldato-class destroyer
- Displacement: 395–415 long tons (401–422 t)
- Length: 65 m (213 ft 3 in) wl; 65.0 m (213 ft 3 in) oa
- Beam: 6.1 m (20 ft 0 in)
- Draught: 2.1 m (6 ft 11 in)
- Propulsion: 2 × Vertical triple-expansion steam engines; 3× Thornycroft water-tube boilers; 6,000 ihp (4,474 kW); 65 t (72 tons) fuel oil
- Speed: 28.5 knots (52.8 km/h; 32.8 mph)
- Range: 1,600 nmi (3,000 km; 1,800 mi) at 12 knots (22 km/h; 14 mph)
- Complement: 50
- Armament: 4 × 76 mm (3 in)/40 guns; 3 × 450 mm (17.7 in) torpedo tubes

Pontiere ("Bridgeman") was a Soldato-class ("Soldier"-class) destroyer of the Italian Regia Marina (Royal Navy). Commissioned in 1910, she served in World War I. Reclassified as a torpedo boat in 1921, she was stricken in 1929.

== Design ==
Pontiere was powered by two sets of triple expansion steam engines fed by three Thornycroft water-tube boilers, producing an estimated 6,000 indicated horsepower (4,474 kW) and driving two propeller shafts. As built, she could reach a maximum speed of 28.5 knots (52.8 km/h; 32.8 mph). Her fuel capacity of 65 tonnes (64 long tons) of fuel oil gave her a range of 1,600 nautical miles (3,000 km; 1,800 mi) at 12 knots (22 km/h; 14 mph). She was fitted with four 76-millimetre (3 in)/40 calibre guns and three 450-millimetre (17.7 in) torpedo tubes.

== Construction and commissioning ==
Pontiere was laid down on 18 November 1905 at the Gio. Ansaldo & C. shipyard in Genoa, Italy. She was launched on 3 January 1910 and completed on 11 February 1910. She was commissioned in 1910.

== Service history ==
A member of the 2nd Squadron's 4th Division, Pontiere ran aground on a rock off Sardinia on 14 September 1911. She was salvaged, repaired at Taranto, and relaunched on 1 November 1913. Her grounding came 15 days before the Italo-Turkish War broke out, and she missed the entire war due to her lengthy repairs.

World War I broke out in 1914, and Italy entered the war on the side of the Allies with its declaration of war on Austria-Hungary on 23 May 1915. At the time, Pontiere, under the command of Capitano di corvetta (Corvette Captain) Mancini, was the flagship of the 4th Destroyer Squadron, based at Brindisi, which also included her sister ships Alpino, Ascaro, Carabiniere, and Fuciliere and the destroyer Zeffiro. On 29 May 1915 Pontiere, Alpino, and their sister ship Corazziere provided support to a formation of destroyers composed of Artigliere, Bersagliere, Garibaldino, and Lanciere as it bombarded the Adria Werke chemical plant in Monfalcone, a production site for poison gases. The ships carried out another bombardment of the Adria Werke on 7 June 1915.

At 19:00 on 8 June 1916 Pontiere departed Vlorë (known to the Italians as Valona) in the Principality of Albania with the protected cruiser Libia and the destroyers Espero, Impavido, and Insidioso to escort the armed merchant cruiser Principe Umberto and the troopship Romagna, which together had embarked the 2,605 men of the Italian Royal Army′s (Regio Esercito′s) 55th Infantry Regiment for transportation to Italy. The convoy had traveled only a short distance when the Austro-Hungarian submarine U-5 hit Principe Umberto in the stern with two torpedoes. Principe Umberto sank in a few minutes about 15 nautical miles (28 km; 17 mi) southwest of Cape Linguetta with the loss of 1,926 of the 2,821 men on board, the worst naval disaster of World War I in terms of lives lost. The escorting warships rescued the survivors but could not locate and counterattack U-5.

On 11 February 1917 Pontiere — now under the command of an officer named Cappelli — Alpino, Carabiniere, Fuciliere, the torpedo boats 19 OS, 20 OS, 21 OS, and 22 OS, and six French airplanes provided escort and support to a group of two French and three Italian seaplanes as the seaplanes conducted a reconnaissance of the Austro-Hungarian Navy base at Pola.

On the night of 13–14 August 1917 Pontiere left Venice with Carabiniere and the destroyers Animoso, Ardente, Audace, Francesco Stocco, Giovanni Acerbi, Giuseppe Cesare Abba, Giuseppe Sirtori, and Vincenzo Giordano Orsini to intercept an Austro-Hungarian force made up of the destroyers Dinara, Reka, Scharfschütze, Streiter, and Velebit and six torpedo boats which had supported an air raid by 32 aircraft against the fortress of Venice which had struck San Giovanni e Paolo Hospital, killing 14 people and injuring around 30 others. Only Vincenzo Giordano Orsini managed to make brief and fleeting contact with the Austro-Hungarian ships before they escaped.

On 24 September 1917 Pontiere, Carabiniere, and Zeffiro got underway from Venice to intervene in a clash between the Italian coastal torpedo boats 9 PN, 10 PN, 11 PN, and 12 PN and four Austro-Hungarian Navy destroyers. The battle ended following the intervention of Italian aircraft, and the Austro-Hungarian destroyers withdrew before the Italian destroyers could engage them.

By late October 1918, Austria-Hungary had effectively disintegrated, and the Armistice of Villa Giusti, signed on 3 November 1918, went into effect on 4 November 1918 and brought hostilities between Austria-Hungary and the Allies to an end. World War I ended a week later with an armistice between the Allies and the German Empire on 11 November 1918.

=== Post-World War I ===
Pontiere was reclassified as a torpedo boat on 1 July 1921. She was stricken from the naval register on 1 July 1929. and subsequently scrapped.

== Bibliography ==
- Beehler, W. H. (1913). The History of the Italian-Turkish War, September 29, 1911 to October 18, 1912 (PDF). Annapolis, Maryland: William H. Beehler. (reprinted from Proceedings of the United States Naval Institute with additions)
- Favre, Franco. La Marina nella Grande Guerra. Le operazioni navali, aeree, subacquee e terrestri in Adriatico (in Italian).
- Fraccaroli, Aldo (1985). "Italy". In Gray, Randal (ed.). Conway's All the World's Fighting Ships 1906–1921. Annapolis: Naval Institute Press. pp. 252–290. ISBN 978-0-87021-907-8.
