= Italian destroyer Lanciere (1907) =

Italian Soldato-class destroyer

History

Italy
- Name: Lanciere
- Namesake: Lancer, a type of cavalryman armed with a lance
- Builder: Gio. Ansaldo & C., Genoa, Kingdom of Italy
- Laid down: 24 July 1905
- Launched: 27 February 1907
- Completed: 1 August 1907
- Commissioned: August 1907
- Stricken: 4 March 1923
- Fate: Scrapped

General characteristics
- Displacement: 395–424 long tons (401–431 t)
- Length: 64.4 m (211 ft 3 in) wl; 65.0 m (213 ft 3 in) oa
- Beam: 6.1 m (20 ft 0 in)
- Draught: 2.1 m (6 ft 11 in)
- Propulsion: 2 × Vertical triple-expansion steam engines; 3× Thornycroft boilers; 6,000 ihp (4,474 kW); As built: 95 t (93 long tons; 105 short tons) coal; Later: 65 t (64 long tons; 72 short tons) fuel oil
- Speed: 28.5 knots (52.8 km/h; 32.8 mph)
- Complement: 55
- Armament: 4× 76 mm (3 in)/40 guns; 3× 450 mm (17.7 in) torpedo tubes; 10× mines

Lanciere ("Lancer") was a Soldato-class ("Soldier"-class) destroyer of the Italian Regia Marina ("Royal Navy"). Commissioned in 1907, she served in the Italo-Turkish War and World War I. She was stricken in 1923.

== Design ==
Lanciere was powered by two sets of triple expansion steam engines fed by three Thornycroft water-tube boilers, producing an estimated 6,000 indicated horsepower (4,474 kW) and driving two propeller shafts. As built, she could reach a maximum speed of 28.5 knots (52.8 km/h; 32.8 mph). Originally, she had a fuel capacity of 95 tonnes (93 long tons) of coal, giving her a range of 1,500 nautical miles (2,800 km; 1,700 mi) at 12 knots (22 km/h; 14 mph) and 400 nautical miles (740 km; 460 mi) at 23.5 knots (43.5 km/h; 27.0 mph); she later was converted to burn fuel oil, with a fuel capacity of 65 tonnes (64 long tons) of oil. She was fitted with four 76-millimetre (3 in)/40 calibre guns and three 450-millimetre (17.7 in) torpedo tubes.

== Construction and commissioning ==
Lanciere was laid down on 24 July 1905 at the Gio. Ansaldo & C. shipyard in Genoa, Italy. She was launched on 27 February 1907 and completed on 1 August 1907. She was commissioned in August 1907.

== Service history ==
=== 1907–1911 ===
A devastating earthquake in the Strait of Messina and subsequent tsunami struck Messina, Sicily, and Reggio Calabria on the Italian mainland on 28 December 1908. On 2 January 1909 Lanciere and the auxiliary ships Atlante, Olimpia, Orfeo, and Verde arrived at Messina to assist in rescue operations.

=== Italo-Turkish War ===
The Italo-Turkish War began on 29 September 1911 with the Kingdom of Italy′s declaration of war on the Ottoman Empire. At the time, Lanciere was part of the 2nd Squadron's 4th Destroyer Division along with her sister ships Bersagliere, Garibaldino, and Granatiere. By 30 September 1911, she was participating along with Bersagliere, Garibaldino, the battleships Napoli and Roma, the armored cruisers Francesco Ferruccio, Giuseppe Garibaldi, and Varese, the torpedo cruiser Coatit, and the destroyers Euro, Freccia, Ostro, and Strale in a blockade of Tripoli.

On 5 May 1912 Lanciere, Coatit, and the auxiliary cruiser Duca di Genova went on patrol in the Aegean Sea between Bodrum and Smyrna on the coast of Anatolia to prevent Ottoman torpedo boats based at Bodrum from attempting an attack to hinder the Italian invasion of Rhodes. After noting a lack of activity by Ottoman forces at Bodrum, the Italian ships returned to Rhodes. On the morning of 17 May 1912, Lanciere and the battleship Emanuele Filiberto supported the advance of Italian troops in the Psithos valley on Rhodes, where the last Ottoman troops remaining on the island had barricaded themselves. The war ended on 18 October 1912 in an Italian victory.

=== World War I ===
==== 1915 ====
World War I broke out in 1914, and Italy entered the war on the side of the Allies with its declaration of war on Austria-Hungary on 23 May 1915. At the time, Lanciere, under the command of Capitano di corvetta (Corvette Captain) Comolli, was part of the 3rd Destroyer Squadron, based at Brindisi, which also included Bersagliere, Garibaldino, and their sister ships Artigliere and Corazziere. On 24 May 1915, the day after Italy's declaration of war, Lanciere, Garibaldino, and their sister ships Alpino, Carabiniere, and Fuciliere conducted a patrol in the upper Adriatic Sea.

On 29 May 1915 Lanciere, Artigliere, Bersagliere, and Garibaldino bombarded the Adria Werke chemical plant in Monfalcone, a production site for poison gases, while Alpino, Corazziere, and their sister ship Pontiere provided support. The ships carried out another bombardment of the Adria Werke on 7 June 1915.

As the war continued, Lanciere also engaged in escort operations. On 8 January 1918 she escorted the large passenger steamers San Giovanni and San Guglielmo as they left Genoa, Italy, bound for New York City. The convoy had instructions to hug the Italian coast. Bersagliere took over the escort from Lanciere off Savona. Shortly thereafter, the Imperial German Navy submarine U-63 attacked the convoy, torpedoing and sinking San Guglielmo in the Gulf of Genoa 800 metres (870 yd) off Loano at 44°07′N 008°18′E.

By late October 1918, Austria-Hungary had effectively disintegrated, and the Armistice of Villa Giusti, signed on 3 November 1918, went into effect on 4 November 1918 and brought hostilities between Austria-Hungary and the Allies to an end. World War I ended a week later with an armistice between the Allies and the German Empire on 11 November 1918.

=== Post-World War I ===
After World War I, Lanciere was reclassified as a torpedo boat on 1 July 1921. She was decommissioned in 1923, stricken from the naval register on 4 March 1923, and subsequently scrapped.
