= Italian destroyer Alpino (1909) =

Italian Soldato-class destroyer

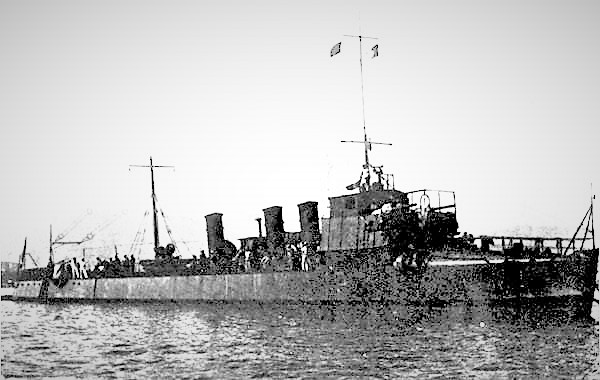

History

Italy
- Name: Alpino
- Namesake: Alpino, a mountain infantryman of the Italian Alpini
- Builder: Gio. Ansaldo & C., Genoa, Kingdom of Italy
- Laid down: 4 December 1905
- Launched: 27 November 1909
- Completed: 1 April 1910
- Commissioned: April 1910
- Reclassified: Torpedo boat 1 July 1921
- Stricken: 1 June 1928
- Identification: Pennant number AP
- Fate: Scrapped

General characteristics
- Class & type: Soldato-class destroyer
- Displacement: 395–415 long tons (401–422 t)
- Length: 65 m (213 ft 3 in) wl; 65.0 m (213 ft 3 in) oa
- Beam: 6.1 m (20 ft 0 in)
- Draught: 2.1 m (6 ft 11 in)
- Propulsion: 2 × Vertical triple-expansion steam engines; 3× Thornycroft water-tube boilers; 6,000 ihp (4,474 kW); 65 t (72 tons) fuel oil
- Speed: 28.5 knots (52.8 km/h; 32.8 mph)
- Range: 1,600 nmi (3,000 km; 1,800 mi) at 12 knots (22 km/h; 14 mph)
- Complement: 50
- Armament: 4 × 76 mm (3 in)/40 guns; 3 × 450 mm (17.7 in) torpedo tubes

Alpino was a Soldato-class ("Soldier"-class) destroyer of the Italian Regia Marina (Royal Navy). Commissioned in 1910, she served actively in the Italo-Turkish War, operating in the Ionian, Aegean, and Red Seas. During World War I she initially operated in the upper Adriatic Sea, conducting reconnaissance and minelaying operations and supporting actions by motor torpedo boats and aircraft. She subsequently operated in the southern Adriatic and the Ionian Sea, where she was assigned to escort operations and patrolling the Otranto Barrage in the Strait of Otranto. Reclassified as a torpedo boat in 1921, she was stricken in 1928.

== Design ==
Alpino was powered by two sets of triple expansion steam engines fed by three Thornycroft water-tube boilers, producing an estimated 6,000 indicated horsepower (4,474 kW) and driving two propeller shafts. As built, she could reach a maximum speed of 28.5 knots (52.8 km/h; 32.8 mph). She had a fuel capacity of 65 tonnes (64 long tons) of fuel oil, giving her a range of 1,600 nautical miles (3,000 km; 1,800 mi) at 12 knots (22 km/h; 14 mph). She was fitted with four 76-millimetre (3 in)/40 calibre guns and three 450-millimetre (17.7 in) torpedo tubes.

== Construction and commissioning ==
Alpino was laid_down on 4 December 1905 at the Gio. Ansaldo & C. shipyard in Genoa, Italy. She was launched on 27 November 1909 and completed on 1 April 1910. She was commissioned in April 1910.

== Service history ==
=== Italo-Turkish War ===
The Italo-Turkish War began on 29 September 1911 with the Kingdom of Italy′s declaration of war on the Ottoman Empire. At the time, Alpino was part of the 2nd Squadron's 3rd Division. On the afternoon of 29 September Alpino took part in one of the first clashes of the war, the Battle of Preveza, when she, along with the destroyers Artigliere, Carabiniere, and Zeffiro and the torpedo boat Spica, engaged the Ottoman Navy torpedo boats Antalya and Tokad as they attempted to leave the port of Preveza on what then was the Ionian Sea coast of the Ottoman Empire. According to some accounts, the Italian ships attacked the two torpedo boats at 14:00, and Artigliere seriously damaged Tokad and pursued her into the anchorage as she attempted to return to Preveza. Meanwhile, Alpino, Carabiniere, Spica, and Zeffiro surrounded Antalya. Hit repeatedly, seriously damaged, and on fire, with four members of her crew killed in action and numerous other crewmen wounded, Antalya struck her colors and ran herself aground on a nearby beach. As Antalya′s crew abandoned ship, members of Alpino′s crew boarded and captured her and removed her flag and her only usable gun, after which Alpino finished her off with gunfire. Carabiniere, Alpino, Spica, and Zeffiro then joined Artigliere in the harbor and sank Tokad and an Ottoman gunboat. As the Italian ships departed, the crew of the Greek steamer Marte cheered them.

In a 1912 magazine article and a 1913 book based on contemporary sources, United States Navy Commodore W. H. Beehler offers a different version of the events of 29 September 1911. According to Beehler, the Italian ships sighted Antalya and Tokad in the Ionian Sea between Corfu and Preveza, steering north-northwestward, at either 15:00 or 16:00. The Italians opened fire, and the Ottoman ships returned fire only feebly. Tokad steamed northward chased by three Italian destroyers, while Antalya headed south with two Italian destroyers in pursuit. Hit 15 times and on fire, Tokad beached herself near Nicopolis and was totally destroyed, with her commanding officer and eight of her sailors either killed by the Italian gunfire or drowned. Meanwhile, Antalya reached Preveza undamaged. The Italian destroyers were undamaged and fired 100 76-millimetre rounds during the engagement.

The battle continued on the morning of 30 September 1911 when, according to some sources, Alpino was operating off Igoumenitsa with other Italian ships when they sighted a force of Ottoman torpedo boats leaving Preveza. When they reported the sighting to higher command, they received orders to let the torpedo boats move away from the coast and then, taking advantage of the greater speed of the Italian ships, close with them and sink them. The Italian ships managed to surround the torpedo boats, which at that point attempted to escape at full steam towards the south instead of heading back toward Preveza. The Italians found this suspicious, and while Artigliere and the destroyer Corazziere pursued the torpedo boats, Alpino steamed north to conduct a reconnaissance of the approaches to Preveza. Alpino soon discovered that the Ottoman torpedo boats were heading south to draw the Italians away from ships which appeared to be trying to reach Preveza unscathed. After sighting suspicious ships heading toward Preveza, Alpino reported the sighting and received orders to stop a steamer flying the Greek flag that was proceeding at her maximum speed toward Preveza. As Alpino approached the ship, she hauled down the Greek flag. After Alpino threatened to torpedo the ship if she did not stop, she came to a halt. She turned out to be the steamer Newa (or Neua) with a Greek captain and crew but carrying Ottoman troops (five officers and 162 soldiers) and a load of ammunition and grain. Meanwhile, Artigliere and Corazziere sank the torpedo boats Alpagot and Hamidiye without the Ottoman vessels being able to return fire, and the rest of the Ottoman torpedo boat force returned safely to Prevenza. Beehler again provides a different narrative, stating that Artigliere and Corazziere penetrated the harbor at Preveza and sank Alpagot and Hamidiye while the two torpedo boats were at anchor, without mentioning Alpino or her activities. According to Beehler, Corazziere then seized the armed yacht "Telied" and tow her away as a prize as the two destroyers put back to sea.

The historian Charles Stephenson offers yet another version of events. According to him, the Italians decided not to attempt an incursion into the harbor at Preveza to attack Antalya after she reached that port on 29 September and instead proceeded to the waters off Igoumenitsa, (Note: Beehler states that the incident took place at Prevesa, not Igoumenitsa, which is contradicted by Stephenson and as well as Bernd Langensiepen and Ahmet Güleryüz, who agree that it took place at Igoumenitsa. That Beehler makes no mention of Antalya in the engagement of 30 September 1911 suggests he is incorrect.) where Alpagot and Hamidiye were anchored in the harbor. Alpino, Artigliere, and Corazziere penetrated the harbor at Igoumenitsa on the morning of 30 September, where Artigliere and Corazziere sank Alpagot and Hamidiye with gunfire while they still were at anchor. Meanwhile, Alpino came alongside the armed yacht "Trablus," whose boilers were under repair. The yacht's crew opened her seacocks in an attempt to scuttle her and abandoned ship. Alpino sent a boarding party aboard the yacht and closed the seacocks to prevent her from sinking. The Alpino crewmen were cutting the yacht's mooring lines when civilians on shore opened fire on the boarding party, prompting Corazziere to bombard the town, silencing the civilian gunfire and damaging the fort at Igoumenitsa, which did not fire during the battle. Alpino then towed the yacht out of port.

On 4 May 1912 Alpino, under the command of Gustavo Nicastro, went to Rhodes, which Italian troops had occupied, to demand the surrender of the local wali (Ottoman governor), but he stalled the Italians and then escaped. The Italian destroyer Ostro captured him later. On 12 May, as Italian forces occupied the Dodecanese, Alpino and the battleship Regina Elena landed troops on Karpathos (known as to the Italians as Scarpanto), taking possession of the island. Alpino subsequently deployed to the Red Sea to reinforce the Italian squadron there. The war ended on 18 October 1912 in an Italian victory.

=== World War I ===
World War I broke out in 1914, and Italy entered the war on the side of the Allies with its declaration of war on Austria-Hungary on 23 May 1915. At the time, Alpino, under the command of Capitano di corvetta (Corvette Captain) Ruta, was part of the 4th Destroyer Squadron, based at Brindisi, which also included Carabiniere, Zeffiro, and the destroyers Ascaro, Fuciliere, and Pontiere. On 24 May 1915, the day after Italy's declaration of war, Alpino, Carabiniere, Fuciliere, and their sister ships Garibaldino and Lanciere conducted a patrol in the upper Adriatic Sea.

On 29 May 1915 Alpino, Corazziere, and Pontiere provided support to a formation of destroyers composed of Artigliere, Bersagliere, Garibaldino, and Lanciere as it bombarded the Adria Werke chemical plant in Monfalcone, a production site for poison gases. The ships carried out another bombardment of the Adria Werke on 7 June 1915.

Supported by Alpino, Fuciliere, and the coastal torpedo boats 40 PN and 46 OS, Zeffiro, under the command of Capitano di fregata (Frigate Captain) Costanzo Ciano and with Lieutenant Nazario Sauro, an Italian irredentist, aboard as pilot, entered the port of Poreč on the western side of Istria, a peninsula on Austria-Hungary's coast, at dawn on 12 May 1916. A group of men from Zeffiro, including Sauro, captured a gendarme who showed them the location of an aircraft hangar. In the meantime, Alpino and the other ships had joined Zeffiro, and at 04:50 they began a bombardment which lasted about 20 minutes. The hangar suffered damage from hits by 76-millimetre (3 in) shells from the Italian ships. Austro-Hungarian coastal artillery batteries returned fire, and then 10 Austro-Hungarian seaplanes attacked the Italian ships. Allied aircraft came to the defense of the Italians, resulting in a dogfight in which Austro-Hungarian seaplanes collided with two Italian and one French aircraft. All the Italian ships returned to base, although they suffered damage and a number of casualties, including four men killed in action. Alpino herself suffered one man killed and one seriously wounded.

On 11 February 1917 Alpino, Carabiniere, Fuciliere, Pontiere, the torpedo boats 19 OS, 20 OS, 21 OS, and 22 OS, and six French airplanes provided escort and support to a group of two French and three Italian seaplanes as the seaplanes conducted a reconnaissance of the Austro-Hungarian Navy base at Pola.

By late October 1918, Austria-Hungary had effectively disintegrated, and the Armistice of Villa Giusti, signed on 3 November 1918, went into effect on 4 November 1918 and brought hostilities between Austria-Hungary and the Allies to an end. World War I ended a week later with an armistice between the Allies and the German Empire on 11 November 1918.

=== Post-World War I ===
Alpino was reclassified as a torpedo boat on 1 July 1921. She was stricken from the naval register on 1 June 1928, and subsequently scrapped.

== Bibliography ==
- Beehler, W. H. (1913). The History of the Italian-Turkish War, September 29, 1911 to October 18, 1912 (PDF). Annapolis, Maryland: William H. Beehler. (reprinted from Proceedings of the United States Naval Institute with additions)
- Favre, Franco. La Marina nella Grande Guerra. Le operazioni navali, aeree, subacquee e terrestri in Adriatico (in Italian).
- Fraccaroli, Aldo (1985). "Italy". In Gray, Randal (ed.). Conway's All the World's Fighting Ships 1906–1921. Annapolis: Naval Institute Press. pp. 252–290. ISBN 978-0-87021-907-8.
- Langensiepen, Bernd & Güleryüz, Ahmet (1995). The Ottoman Steam Navy 1828–1923. London: Conway Maritime Press. ISBN 978-0-85177-610-1.
- Stephenson, Charles (2014). A Box of Sand: The Italo-Ottoman War 1911–1912. Ticehurst: Tattered Flag Press. ISBN 978-0-9576892-2-0.
