= SS San Guglielmo (1911) =

Italian passenger ship (1911–1918)

History

Italy
- Name: San Guglielmo
- Owner: Transoceanica Soc. Italiana Di Navigazione
- Port of registry: Kingdom of Italy, Naples
- Route: Italy - New York
- Builder: D. & W. Henderson & Co., Ltd., Glasgow
- Yard number: 473
- Completed: 1911
- Acquired: 1911
- Maiden voyage: 31 October 1911
- In service: 31 October 1911
- Out of service: 8 January 1918
- Identification: Official number: 148
- Fate: Torpedoed and sunk on 8 January 1918

General characteristics
- Type: Passenger ship
- Tonnage: 8,145 GRT
- Length: 143.3 m (470 ft 2 in)
- Beam: 17.1 m (56 ft 1 in)
- Depth: 10.2 m (33 ft 6 in)
- Installed power: Two 3 cyl. triple expansion steam engine
- Propulsion: 2 screw propellers
- Speed: 15 knots (28 km/h; 17 mph)
- Capacity: 2,425 passengers (50 first class, 175 second class and 2,200 third class)
- Crew: 124
- Notes: 2 masts and 2 funnels

SS San Guglielmo was an Italian passenger ship that was torpedoed and sunk by the German submarine SM U-63 in the Gulf of Genoa off Loano in the Mediterranean Sea on 8 January 1918 with the loss of a single life, while she was travelling from Genoa, Italy to New York, United States via Gibraltar.

== Construction ==
San Guglielmo was built at the D. & W. Henderson & Co., Ltd. shipyard in Glasgow, United Kingdom in 1911, and completed that same year. The ship was 143.3 metres (470 ft 2 in) long, had a beam of 17.1 metres (56 ft 1 in) and a depth of 10.2 metres (33 ft 6 in). She was assessed at 8,145 gross register tons (GRT) and had two 3-cylinder triple expansion steam engine producing 1,033 nhp, driving two screw propellers. The ship could reach a maximum speed of 15 knots (28 km/h; 17 mph) and possessed two masts and two funnels. As built, she had the capacity to carry 2,425 passengers (50 first class, 175 second class and 2,200 third class).

== Career and loss ==
San Guglielmo departed Naples, Italy for New York, United States for her maiden voyage on 31 October 1911. She continued on her transatlantic voyages, carrying mostly immigrants to the New World until Italy entered the First World War and San Guglielmo was converted to be used as a troopship in May 1915. On 8 January 1918 at 7 am, San Guglielmo departed Genoa for New York via Gibraltar as part of a convoy alongside her sister ship SS San Giovanni and under the escort of the Italian destroyer Lanciere. The ships reached Savona that same day, where Lanciere was replaced by her sister ship the Italian destroyer Bersagliere before the convoy continued on to Gibraltar. As the convoy was sailing in the Gulf of Genoa that same day, San Guglielmo was hit by a torpedo from the German submarine SM U-63. As the ships had been instructed to sail near the Italian coast, San Guglielmo's captain attempted to save the sinking ship by steaming towards the nearby shore in an effort to ground her. The ship however was taking on water too quickly and ultimately foundered within 7 minutes, 800 metres (870 yd) from shore with the loss of a single life. Her 123 surviving crew were rescued in a timely manner due to their close proximity to the Italian coast.

== Wreck ==
The wreck of San Guglielmo lies at (44°07′N 08°18′E) some 800 metres (870 yd) from the coast of Loano in 98 feet (30 m) of water. The wreck was visited by the Artiglio in the 1920s, who recovered all the possible materials, thereby leaving the wreck as an empty skeleton from which the plates and beams stand out. The wreck's close proximity to shore and shallow depth, makes it a good site for recreational divers to explore although visibility can fluctuate due to the muddy seabed the wreck rests on. They also have to be careful of the broken metal plates and sharp beams that still stick out of the seabed from the scattered and broken wreck.
