= Italian destroyer Ascaro =

Italian Soldato-class destroyer

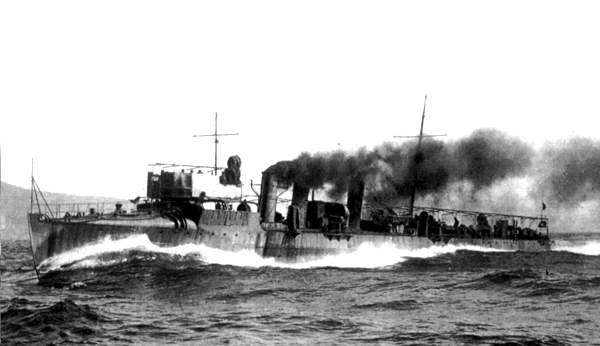

Chinese Empire
- Name: Tsing Po (or Ching Po)
- Ordered: 1910
- Builder: Gio. Ansaldo & C., Genoa, Kingdom of Italy
- Laid down: 1911
- Fate: Sold to Kingdom of Italy 1912

Italy
- Name: Ascaro
- Namesake: Ascaro, the Italian singular for an askari, an African colonial soldier
- Acquired: 1912
- Launched: 6 December 1912
- Completed: 21 July 1913
- Commissioned: July 1913
- Reclassified: Torpedo boat 1 July 1921
- Identification: Pennant number AS, AO
- Stricken: 31 May 1930
- Fate: Scrapped

General characteristics
- Class & type: Soldato-class destroyer
- Displacement: 395–415 long tons (401–422 t)
- Length: 65 m (213 ft 3 in) wl; 65.0 m (213 ft 3 in) oa
- Beam: 6.1 m (20 ft 0 in)
- Draught: 2.1 m (6 ft 11 in)
- Propulsion: 2 × Vertical triple-expansion steam engines; 3× Thornycroft water-tube boilers; 6,000 ihp (4,474 kW); One coal-fired boiler, two oil-fired boilers
- Speed: 28.5 knots (52.8 km/h; 32.8 mph)
- Range: 1,500 nmi (2,800 km; 1,700 mi) at 12 knots (22 km/h; 14 mph)
- Complement: 55
- Armament: As ordered: 2 × 76 mm (3 in)/40 guns; 4 x 47 mm (1.9) guns; 3 × 450 mm (17.7 in) torpedo tubes; As completed: 4 × 76 mm (3 in)/40 guns; 3 × 450 mm (17.7 in) torpedo tubes

Ascaro ("Askari") was a Soldato-class ("Soldier"-class) destroyer of the Italian Regia Marina ("Royal Navy"). Commissioned in 1913, she served during World War I. Reclassified as a torpedo boat in 1921, she was stricken in 1930.

== Design, construction, and commissioning ==
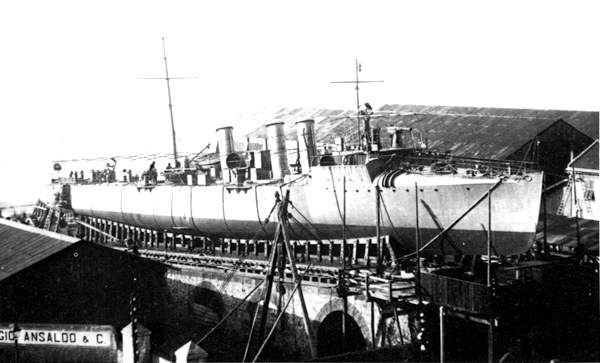
Ascaro in December 1912, just before her launch.

Ascaro originated as Tsing Po (or Ching Po), a destroyer based on the Italian Soldato class that the Chinese Empire ordered in 1910 for the Imperial Chinese Navy. Tsing Po differed from the other destroyers of her class in having a unique mixed-fuel propulsion system, with one coal-fired boiler and two oil-fired ones. Her armament also differed: While the other Soldato-class ships had four 76-millimetre (3 in)/40 calibre guns, Tsing Po was to have a mixed armament of two 76-millimetre (3 in)/40 calibre and four 47 mm (1.9) guns in addition to three 450-millimetre (17.7 in) torpedo tubes.

The eleventh and last Soldato-class ship to be constructed, Tsing Po was laid down in 1911 at the Gio. Ansaldo & C. shipyard in Genoa, Italy, a year after the completion of all the other units of the class. While she was on the building ways, the Kingdom of Italy purchased her in 1912 for service in the Italian Regia Marina ("Royal Navy") Renamed Ascaro, she was launched on 6 December 1912 and completed on 21 July 1913. She was commissioned in July 1913.

As completed, Ascaro was powered by two sets of triple expansion steam engines fed by three Thornycroft water-tube boilers, producing an estimated 6,000 indicated horsepower (4,474 kW) and driving two propeller shafts. She could reach a maximum speed of 28.5 knots (52.8 km/h; 32.8 mph). Uniquely among the Soldato-class ships, she retained her mixed-fuel propulsion system, which gave her a range comparable to that of the other ships of her class, 1,500 nautical miles (2,800 km; 1,700 mi) at 12 knots (22 km/h; 14 mph). The Italians abandoned the gun armament the Chinese envisioned for her, and instead fitted her with the same armament as the rest of the Soldato class, i.e., four 76-millimetre (3 in)/40 calibre guns and three 450-millimetre (17.7 in) torpedo tubes.

== Service history ==
World War I broke out in 1914, and Italy entered the war on the side of the Allies with its declaration of war on Austria-Hungary on 23 May 1915. At the time, Ascaro, under the command of Capitano di corvetta (Corvette Captain) Baistrocchi, was part of the 4th Destroyer Squadron, based at Brindisi, which also included her sister ships Alpino, Carabiniere, Fuciliere, and Pontiere and the destroyer Zeffiro.

In October 1916 Ascaro, the destroyers Borea, Garibaldino, and Nembo and four torpedo boats provided protection and support to a landing force consisting of the armored cruiser Francesco Ferruccio and the steamers Ausonia, Bulgaria, Choising, and Polcevera sent to occupy Sarandë (known to the Italians as Santi Quaranta), in the Principality of Albania. At 05:15 on 2 October 1916, four platoons of sailors, a unit of miners, and a unit of personnel from Francesco Ferruccio landed on the beach and quickly occupied the area, the 32 members of the Greek garrison at Sarandë having no option other than to retreat after protesting the Italian operation. After disembarking an infantry battalion and a cavalry squadron, the steamers departed at 16:00 on 2 October for Vlorë, where they embarked more troops. On 3 October, Ausonia and Polcevera landed a pack artillery battery and a second cavalry squadron, and on 4 October the operation was completed when Bulgaria and Choising put another infantry battalion and a third cavalry squadron ashore.

Ascaro continued her war service but did not participate in any other significant operations during the war. By late October 1918, Austria-Hungary had effectively disintegrated, and the Armistice of Villa Giusti, signed on 3 November 1918, went into effect on 4 November 1918 and brought hostilities between Austria-Hungary and the Allies to an end. World War I ended a week later with an armistice between the Allies and the German Empire on 11 November 1918.

=== Post-World War I ===
Ascaro was reclassified as a torpedo boat on 1 July 1921. She was stricken from the naval register on 31 May 1930. She subsequently was scrapped.

== Bibliography ==
- Favre, Franco. La Marina nella Grande Guerra. Le operazioni navali, aeree, subacquee e terrestri in Adriatico (in Italian).
- Fraccaroli, Aldo (1985). "Italy". In Gray, Randal (ed.). Conway's All the World's Fighting Ships 1906–1921. Annapolis: Naval Institute Press. pp. 252–290. ISBN 978-0-87021-907-8.
