= Battle of Kunfuda Bay =

Naval battle of the Italo-Turkish War

Coordinates: 19°8′9.2″N 41°3′54.3″E

- Part of the Italo-Turkish War
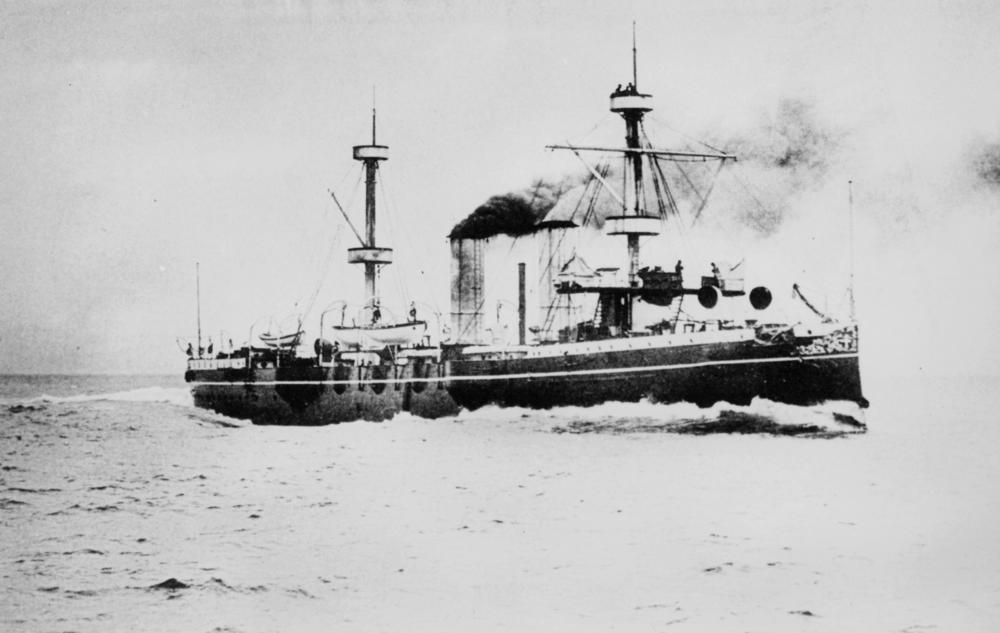
- The Italian cruiser Piemonte
Date	7 and 8 January 1912
Location	Kunfuda Bay, Red Sea
Result	Italian victory

Belligerents
Kingdom of Italy	Ottoman Empire

Commanders and leaders
Osvaldo Paladini	Unknown

Strength
1 protected cruiser 2 destroyers	6 gunboats 1 armed tugboat 1 armed yacht

Casualties and losses
None	6 gunboats destroyed 1 tugboat sunk 1 yacht captured

The Battle of Kunfuda Bay was a naval battle of the Italo-Turkish War between small squadrons of the Italian and Ottoman navies. On 7 January 1912, the Italian protected cruiser Piemonte and the Soldato-class destroyers Artigliere and Garibaldino, cruising the Red Sea, discovered six Ottoman gunboats, a tugboat, and a yacht in the harbor at Kunfuda. The vessels engaged for over three hours and five Ottoman vessels were sunk and four dhows were captured. Three of the gunboats were damaged during the battle and grounded on the beach to prevent them from sinking. The following morning, the Italian vessels returned to destroy the remaining three vessels; the yacht, which had been sunk, was later salvaged and seized by Italy. After the battle and until the war's end, the Italian squadron established a blockade of Ottoman ports in the Red Sea and frequently bombarded Ottoman positions.

== Background ==
Following the outbreak of the Italo-Turkish War in September 1911, the Italian Regia Marina (Royal Navy) concentrated a squadron of cruisers, destroyers, and light craft in the Red Sea to protect Italian Eritrea from a perceived threat of invasion by Ottoman forces in the Arabian peninsula. In late 1911, Italian warships attacked Ottoman ports along the Red Sea to destroy any vessels that might be used to ferry an army to Eritrea. By the end of the year, the Italians had amassed a squadron of three protected cruisers, a torpedo cruiser, four destroyers, and two gunboats, among other vessels. This force was commanded by Captain Giovanni Cerrina Feroni.

To answer the Italians, the only major Ottoman naval unit in the region was the torpedo cruiser Peyk-i Şevket; after briefly engaging the Italian torpedo cruiser Aretusa and the gunboat Volturno off Al Hudaydah, she fled into the port, and was later interned in British-controlled Suez. The bulk of the Ottoman fleet was concentrated in the Mediterranean Sea, and it remained in the safety of the Sea of Marmara, where it could support the coastal defenses along the Dardanelles. Six gunboats that had been stationed in the Persian Gulf were recalled to the Mediterranean, but after their arrival in the Red Sea, they had run low on coal. A steamer, Kayseri, was to provide coal for the vessels, but she had been captured by the Italian cruiser Puglia on 16 December.

== Battle ==
The Italians had learned of the presence of the gunboats, so in early January, the protected cruiser Piemonte and the destroyers Artigliere and Garibaldino searched for the gunboats while the cruisers Calabria and Puglia carried out diversionary bombardments against Jebl Tahr, and Al Luḩayyah. Piemonte and the destroyers located the Ottoman flotilla on 7 January. The Ottoman force consisted of the gunboats Ordu, Bafra, Refahiye, Gökçedağ, Kastamonu, and Ayintag, the armed tugboat Muha, and the armed yacht Şipka.

The Italians opened fire at a range of 4,500 meters (4,900 yd), and in a bombardment that lasted for three hours, sank three of the gunboats and forced the other three to run themselves aground to avoid sinking. The following morning, the Italian vessels returned and sent landing parties ashore to destroy the remaining gunboats and seize some light guns from the vessels. The Italian warships then bombarded the port itself, before seizing four dhows. Şipka was later raised and taken to Italy as a prize; she was later commissioned into Italian service under the name Cunfida.

== Aftermath ==
With the destruction of the remaining Ottoman naval force in the area, the Italians proclaimed a blockade of the Arabian Red Sea coast and began seizing vessels carrying contraband, though they did allow Muslims to cross the Red Sea on their pilgrimage to Mecca. For the remainder of the war, Italian cruisers operated in the area, bombarding Ottoman positions with impunity. The Ottomans eventually agreed to surrender in October, ending the war.
