= Italian destroyer Zeffiro (1904) =

Italian Nembo-class destroyer

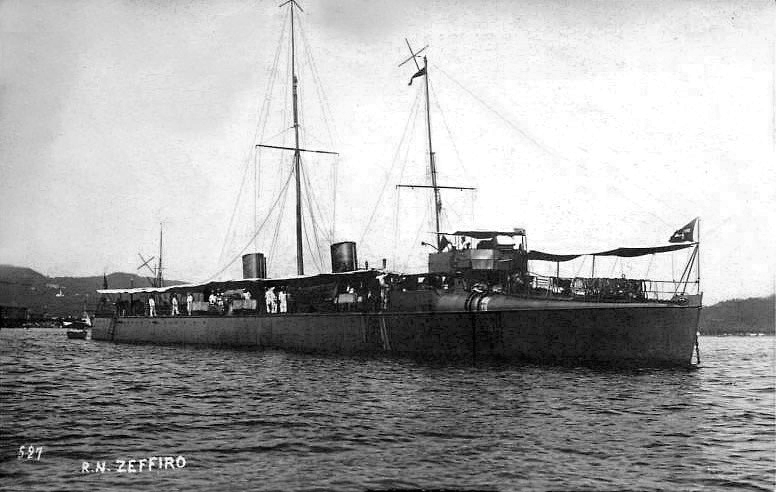
- Zeffiro anchored in the Gulf of La Spezia in 1905. She is in her original two-funnel configuration.

History

Kingdom of Italy
- Name: Zeffiro
- Namesake: Zephyr, a west wind
- Builder: Cantiere Pattison, Naples, Kingdom of Italy
- Launched: 14 May 1904
- Commissioned: April 1905
- Reclassified: Torpedo boat 1921
- Decommissioned: March 1924
- Fate: Discarded 13 March 1924; Scrapped

General characteristics
- Type: Destroyer
- Displacement: 325 long tons (330 t) normal; 380 long tons (390 t) full load
- Length: 63.39 m (208 ft 0 in) pp; 64.00 m (210 ft 0 in) oa
- Beam: 5.94 m (19 ft 6 in)
- Draught: 2.29 m (7 ft 6 in)
- Propulsion: As built: 2 × vertical triple-expansion steam engines; 3× Thornycroft boilers; 5,000 ihp (3,728 kW); Post-World War I; 3,400 ihp (2,535 kW)
- Speed: As built: 30 knots (56 km/h; 35 mph); Post-World War I: 25 knots (46 km/h; 29 mph)
- Complement: 55
- Armament: As built: 5 × QF 6 pounder Nordenfelt 57 mm/43 guns; 3 × 356 mm (14 in) torpedo tubes; 1 × 356 mm (14 in) bow torpedo tube; 1910: 4 × Cannon 76/40 (3 in) Model 1916 guns; 2 x 450 mm (17.7 in) torpedo tubes; Post-World War I: 3 × Cannon 76/40 (3 in) Model 1916 guns; 1 × Colt Browning 65-mm/80 machine gun; 2 x 450 mm (17.7 in) torpedo tubes

Zeffiro ("Zephyr") was an Italian Nembo-class destroyer. Commissioned into service in the Italian Regia Marina (Royal Navy) in 1905, she served in the Italo-Turkish War and World War I, playing an active role in the Adriatic campaign. Reclassified as a torpedo boat in 1921, she was decommissioned in 1924.

== Construction, commissioning, and modernization ==
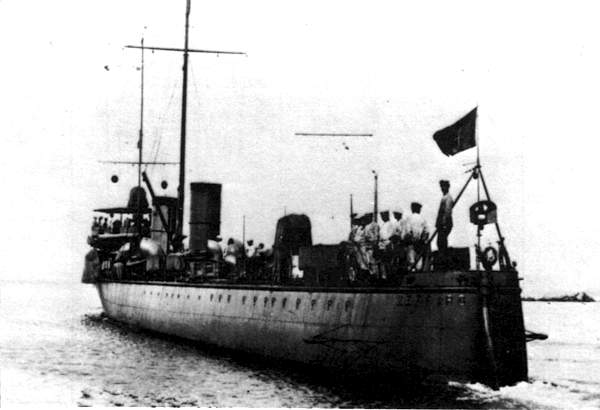
Zeffiro sometime between 1908 and 1910 in her original two-funnel configuration.

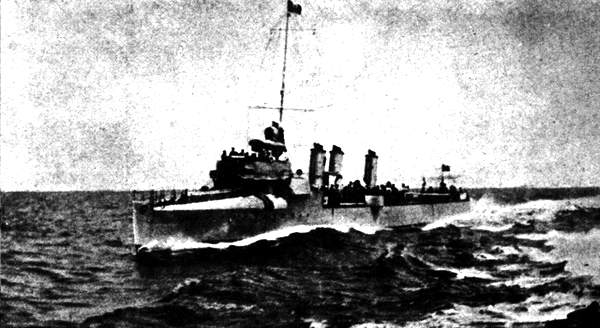
Zeffiro with three funnels after her 1912 modernization.

Zeffiro was laid down at the Cantiere Pattison (English: Pattison Shipyard) in Naples, Italy, and launched on 14 May 1904 and completed on 1 April 1905. She was commissioned in April 1905.

At various times between 1909 and 1912, each of the Nembo-class destroyers underwent a radical modernization; Zeffiro′s took place in 1912. Her coal-fired boilers were converted into oil-fired ones, and her original two short, squat funnels were replaced with three smaller, more streamlined ones, profoundly altering her appearance. Her armament also changed, with her original five QF 6 pounder Nordenfelt 57 mm/43 guns replaced by four Cannon 76/40 (3 in) Model 1916 guns, and her original four 356-millimetre (14 in) torpedo tubes replaced by two 450-millimetre (17.7 in) tubes. Sometime between 1914 and 1918, Zeffiro underwent additional modifications in which minelaying equipment was installed aboard her.

== Service history ==
=== Italo-Turkish War ===
The Italo-Turkish War began on 29 September 1911 with the Kingdom of Italy′s declaration of war on the Ottoman Empire. At the time, Zeffiro was assigned to the Division of the Torpedo Boat Inspector and was being held in reserve at La Spezia. On the afternoon of 29 September, however, she took part in one of the first clashes of the war, the Battle of Preveza, when she, along with the destroyers Alpino, Artigliere, and Carabiniere and the torpedo boat Spica engaged the Ottoman Navy torpedo boats Antalya and Tokad as they attempted to leave the port of Preveza on what then was the Ionian Sea coast of the Ottoman Empire. The Italian ships attacked the two torpedo boats at 14:00, and Artigliere seriously damaged Tokad and pursued her into the anchorage as she attempted to return to Preveza. Meanwhile, Zeffiro, Alpino, Carabiniere and Spica surrounded Antalya. Hit repeatedly, seriously damaged, and on fire, with four members of her crew killed in action and numerous other crewmen wounded, Antalya struck her colors and ran herself aground on a nearby beach. As Antalya′s crew abandoned ship, members of Alpino′s crew boarded and captured her and removed her flag and her only usable gun, after which Alpino finished her off with gunfire. Zeffiro, Alpino, Carabiniere, and Spica then joined Artigliere in the harbor and sank Tokad and an Ottoman gunboat. As the Italian ships departed, the crew of the Greek steamer Marte cheered them.

In a 1912 magazine article and a 1913 book based on contemporary sources, United States Navy Commodore W. H. Beehler offers a different version of the events of 29 September 1911. According to Beehler, the Italian ships sighted Antalya and Tokad in the Ionian Sea between Corfu and Preveza, steering north-northwestward, at either 15:00 or 16:00. The Italians opened fire, and the Ottoman ships returned fire only feebly. Tokad steamed northward chased by three Italian destroyers, while Antalya headed south with two Italian destroyers in pursuit. Hit 15 times and on fire, Tokad beached herself near Nicopolis and was totally destroyed, with her commanding officer and eight of her sailors either killed by the Italian gunfire or drowned. Meanwhile, Antalya reached Preveza undamaged. The Italian destroyers were undamaged and fired 100 76-millimetre rounds during the engagement.

=== World War I ===
==== 1915 ====
World War I broke out in 1914, and Italy entered the war on the side of the Allies with its declaration of war on Austria-Hungary on 23 May 1915. At the time, Zeffiro, under the command of Capitano di corvetta (Corvette Captain) Arturo Ciano – a future admiral – as well as Alpino, Carabiniere, and the destroyers Ascaro, Fuciliere, and Pontiere made up the 4th Destroyer Squadron, based at Brindisi. In the predawn hours of 24 May 1915, during the first night of Italy's participation in the war, Zeffiro took part in the Raid on Porto Buso. At 02:00, she entered the navigable channel that led to the island of Porto Buso at the mouth of the river Ausa in the Grado Lagoon, a part of the larger Marano Lagoon, on which an Austro-Hungarian barracks and small port were located. At 03:00, from a range of about 500 metres (550 yd), she fired a torpedo at the port's jetty, damaging it. She then destroyed the motor boats and other small boats moored there and bombarded the barracks, damaging them and setting them on fire. The bombardment killed 11 Austro-Hungarians, who either died in the shelling itself or drowned while trying to swim to safety, and 48 others, including the commanding officer, surrendered to Zeffiro, which brought them aboard and took them to Venice as prisoners-of-war. Of the Austro-Hungarians based on Porto Buso, only 23 avoided death or capture, only six of whom were on Porto Buso itself: The other 17 were on other islands in the lagoon at the time of the raid.

==== 1916 ====
On 30 April 1916, Zeffiro got underway to lay a minefield in the Adriatic Sea off Šibenik (known to the Italians as Sebenico) on the coast of Austria-Hungary, but had to abort the mission and return to base after encountering the Austro-Hungarian hospital ships Anfitride and Tirol. On the nights of 3–4 May and 4–5 May 1916, Zeffiro and Fuciliere succeeded in laying a minefield off Šibenik.

Supported by Alpino, Fuciliere, and the coastal torpedo boats 40 PN and 46 OS, Zeffiro, under the command of Capitano di fregata (Frigate Captain) Costanzo Ciano – brother of her previous commander – and with Lieutenant Nazario Sauro, an Italian irredentist, aboard as pilot, entered the port of Poreč on the western side of Istria, a peninsula on Austria-Hungary's coast, at dawn on 12 May 1916. A group of men from Zeffiro, including Sauro, captured a gendarme who showed them the location of an aircraft hangar. In the meantime the other ships had joined Zeffiro, and at 04:50 they began a bombardment which lasted about 20 minutes. The hangar suffered damage from hits by 76-millimetre (3 in) shells from the Italian ships. Austro-Hungarian coastal artillery batteries returned fire, and then 10 Austro-Hungarian seaplanes attacked the Italian ships. Allied aircraft came to the defense of the Italians, resulting in a dogfight in which Austro-Hungarian seaplanes collided with two Italian and one French aircraft. All the Italian ships returned to base, although they suffered damage and a number of casualties, including four men killed in action.

On 18 July 1916 Zeffiro and the torpedo boats Climene and Procione towed three seaplanes – L 141, L 156, and L 157 – to a point in the Adriatic Sea about 20 nautical miles (37 km; 23 mi) from the Dalmatian island of Mljet (known to the Italians as Meleda) – and supported them as they made an incursion into the Velebit Channel (known to the Italians as the Morlacca Channel) between the Dalmatian coast and the island of Pag (known to the Italians as Pago). The incursion was unsuccessful, yielding no results except for the loss of two of the seaplanes.

==== 1917–1918 ====
On 24 September 1917 Zeffiro, Carabiniere, and Pontiere got underway from Venice to intervene in a clash between the Italian coastal torpedo boats 9 PN, 10 PN, 11 PN, and 12 PN and four Austro-Hungarian Navy destroyers. The battle ended following the intervention of Italian aircraft, and the Austro-Hungarian destroyers withdrew before the Italian destroyers could engage them.

By late October 1918, Austria-Hungary had effectively disintegrated, and the Armistice of Villa Giusti, signed on 3 November 1918, went into effect on 4 November 1918 and brought hostilities between Austria-Hungary and the Allies to an end. World War I ended a week later with an armistice between the Allies and the German Empire on 11 November 1918.

=== Post-World War I ===
After World War I ended, Zeffiro underwent modifications to her superstructure, propulsion system, and armament. Her bridge was moved aft, one of her three funnels was removed, and her engine power dropped to 3,400 horsepower (2,535 kW) and her maximum speed to 25 knots (46 km/h; 29 mph). In addition, one of her 76-millimetre guns was removed and a Colt Browning 65-millimeter/80-caliber antiaircraft machine gun was installed. Reclassified as a torpedo boat in 1921, she was stricken from the naval register in 1923 and subsequently scrapped.
