= Italian destroyer Fuciliere (1909) =

Italian Soldato-class destroyer

History

Italy
- Name: Fuciliere
- Namesake: Fusilier, a type of soldier
- Builder: Gio. Ansaldo & C., Genoa, Kingdom of Italy
- Laid down: 28 October 1905
- Launched: 21 August 1909
- Completed: 26 January 1910
- Commissioned: 1910
- Reclassified: Torpedo boat 1 July 1921
- Identification: Pennant number FC, FL
- Decommissioned: 1932
- Stricken: 15 December 1932
- Fate: Scrapped

General characteristics
- Class & type: Soldato-class destroyer
- Displacement: 395–415 long tons (401–422 t)
- Length: 65 m (213 ft 3 in) wl; 65.0 m (213 ft 3 in) oa
- Beam: 6.1 m (20 ft 0 in)
- Draught: 2.1 m (6 ft 11 in)
- Propulsion: 2 × Vertical triple-expansion steam engines; 3× Thornycroft water-tube boilers; 6,000 ihp (4,474 kW); 65 t (72 tons) fuel oil
- Speed: 28.5 knots (52.8 km/h; 32.8 mph)
- Range: 1,600 nmi (3,000 km; 1,800 mi) at 12 knots (22 km/h; 14 mph)
- Complement: 50
- Armament: 4 × 76 mm (3 in)/40 guns; 3 × 450 mm (17.7 in) torpedo tubes

Fuciliere ("Fusilier") was a Soldato-class ("Soldier"-class) destroyer of the Italian Regia Marina (Royal Navy). Commissioned in 1910, she served during World War I. Reclassified as a torpedo boat in 1921, she was stricken in 1932.

== Design ==
Fuciliere was powered by two sets of triple expansion steam engines fed by three Thornycroft water-tube boilers, producing an estimated 6,000 indicated horsepower (4,474 kW) and driving two propeller shafts. As built, she could reach a maximum speed of 28.5 knots (52.8 km/h; 32.8 mph). She had a fuel capacity of 65 tonnes (64 long tons) of fuel oil, giving her a range of 1,600 nautical miles (3,000 km; 1,800 mi) at 12 knots (22 km/h; 14 mph). She was fitted with four 76-millimetre (3 in)/40 calibre guns and three 450-millimetre (17.7 in) torpedo tubes.

== Construction and commissioning ==
Fuciliere was laid down on 28 October 1905 at the Gio. Ansaldo & C. shipyard in Genoa, Italy. She was launched on 21 August 1909 and completed on 26 January 1910. She was commissioned in 1910.

== Service history ==
=== World War I ===
World War I broke out in 1914, and Italy entered the war on the side of the Allies with its declaration of war on Austria-Hungary on 23 May 1915. At the time, Fuciliere, under the command of Capitano di corvetta (Corvette Captain) Angelo Levi Bianchini, was part of the 4th Destroyer Squadron, based at Brindisi, which also included her sister ships Alpino, Ascaro, Carabiniere, and Pontiere and the destroyer Zeffiro. On 24 May 1915, the day after Italy's declaration of war, Fuciliere, Alpino, Carabiniere, and their sister ships Garibaldino and Lanciere conducted a patrol in the upper Adriatic Sea.

On the nights of 3–4 May and 4–5 May 1916, Fuciliere and Zeffiro laid a minefield in the Adriatic Sea off Šibenik (known to the Italians as Sebenico) on the coast of Austria-Hungary.

Escorted as far as the Austro-Hungarian defensive barrage by the scout cruisers Cesare Rossarol and Guglielmo Pepe and supported by Fuciliere — still under Bianchini's command — as well as Alpino and the coastal torpedo boats 40 PN and 46 OS, Zeffiro, under the command of Capitano di fregata (Frigate Captain) Costanzo Ciano and with Lieutenant Nazario Sauro, an Italian irredentist, aboard as pilot, entered the port of Poreč on the western side of Istria, a peninsula on Austria-Hungary's coast, at dawn on 12 June 1916. A group of men from Zeffiro, including Sauro, captured a gendarme who showed them the location of an aircraft hangar. In the meantime, Fuciliere and the other ships had joined Zeffiro, and at 04:50 they began a bombardment which lasted about 20 minutes. The hangar suffered damage from hits by 76-millimetre (3 in) shells from the Italian ships. Austro-Hungarian coastal artillery batteries returned fire, and then 10 Austro-Hungarian seaplanes attacked the Italian ships. Allied aircraft came to the defense of the Italians, resulting in a dogfight in which Austro-Hungarian seaplanes collided with two Italian and one French aircraft. All the Italian ships returned to base, although they suffered damage and a number of casualties, including four men killed in action.

On 11 February 1917 Fuciliere, Alpino, Carabiniere, Pontiere, the torpedo boats 19 OS, 20 OS, 21 OS, and 22 OS, and six French airplanes provided escort and support to a group of two French and three Italian seaplanes as the seaplanes conducted a reconnaissance of the Austro-Hungarian Navy base at Pola.

By late October 1918, Austria-Hungary had effectively disintegrated, and the Armistice of Villa Giusti, signed on 3 November 1918, went into effect on 4 November 1918 and brought hostilities between Austria-Hungary and the Allies to an end. World War I ended a week later with an armistice between the Allies and the German Empire on 11 November 1918.

=== Post-World War I ===
Fuciliere was reclassified as a torpedo boat on 1 July 1921. She was decommissioned in 1932 — the last Soldato-class ship to be decommissioned — and was stricken from the naval register on 15 December 1932. She subsequently was scrapped.

== Bibliography ==
- Favre, Franco. La Marina nella Grande Guerra. Le operazioni navali, aeree, subacquee e terrestri in Adriatico (in Italian).
- Fraccaroli, Aldo (1985). "Italy". In Gray, Randal (ed.). Conway's All the World's Fighting Ships 1906–1921. Annapolis: Naval Institute Press. pp. 252–290. ISBN 978-0-87021-907-8.
