= Soldato-class destroyer =

Italian Regia Marina class of destroyers

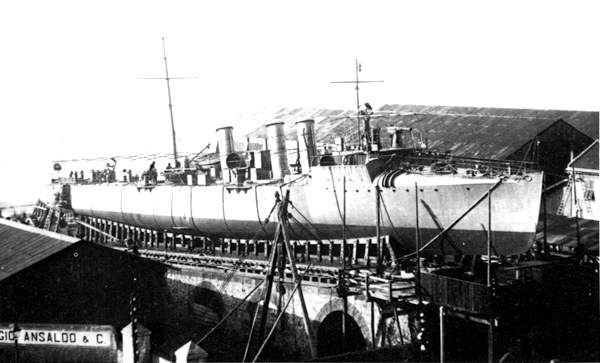
- Ascaro before launch

Class overview
- Builders: Ansaldo, Genoa
- Operators: Regia Marina
- Preceded by: Nembo class
- Succeeded by: Indomito class
- Built: 1905–1913
- In commission: 1907–1932
- Completed: 11
- Lost: 1
- Scrapped: 10

General characteristics
- Displacement: 395–424 long tons (401–431 t)
- Length: 64.4 m (211 ft 3 in) wl; 65.0 m (213 ft 3 in) oa
- Beam: 6.1 m (20 ft 0 in)
- Draught: 2.1 m (6 ft 11 in)
- Propulsion: 2 × Vertical triple-expansion steam engines; 3× Thornycroft boilers; 6,000 ihp (4,500 kW)
- Speed: 28.5 knots (52.8 km/h; 32.8 mph)
- Complement: 55 (Artigliere group and Ascaro); 50 (Alpino group)
- Armament: 4× 76 mm (3 in)/40 guns; 3× 450 mm (17.7 in) torpedo tubes; 10 mines

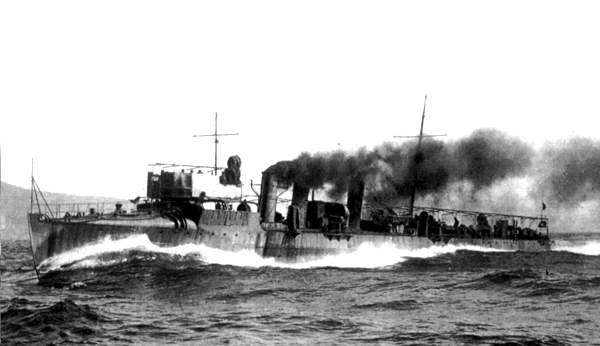
Ascaro at high speed

The Soldato class (also known as the Soldati class (Note: Fraccaroli and the current Italian Navy refer to the class as the Soldato class, while Gardiner and Gray refer to the class as the Soldati class.)) was a class of destroyers of the Italian Regia Marina (Royal Navy) built by Ansaldo of Genoa prior to the First World War. Ten were built for the Regia Marina between 1905 and 1910, while an eleventh ship was built for China but purchased by Italy before completion. They served during the First World War, where one was lost, with the remaining ships sold for scrap in the 1920s and early 1930s.

== Design ==
The Soldato class was ordered from Ansaldo as an improved version of the Nembo-class destroyer, a class of six turtleback destroyers built for the Italian Navy by the Pattison shipyard of Naples to a modified Thornycroft design between 1899 and 1905. The new design carried a more powerful armament than the earlier ships, with four 76 mm (3 in)/40 calibre guns (capable of firing a 5.9 kg (13 lb) shell to a range of 9,850 m (32,320 ft) at a rate of fire of 15 rounds per minute per gun) and three 450 mm (17.7 in) torpedo tubes instead of the five 57 mm guns and four 356 mm (14 in) tubes carried by the Nembo class.

The ships were powered by two sets of triple expansion steam engines fed by three Thornycroft water-tube boilers and driving two propeller shafts. The machinery was rated at 6,000 ihp (4,500 kW) to give a speed of 28.5 knots (52.8 km/h; 32.8 mph). The ships were fitted with three funnels. Six ships (the Artigliere group) had coal-fired boilers, carrying 95 t of coal, sufficient to give a range of 1,500 nautical miles (1,700 mi; 2,800 km) at a speed of 12 knots (22 km/h; 14 mph) or 400 nautical miles (740 km; 460 mi) at 23.5 knots (43.5 km/h; 27.0 mph). Four more ships (the Alpino group) were fitted with oil-fired boilers, with 65 t of oil giving a range of 1,600 nautical miles (3,000 km; 1,800 mi) at 12 knots.

All 10 ships were laid down in 1905, with the first four ships of the Artigliere group completed in 1907, with the remaining ships delivered in 1910. In 1910, China placed an order for a single destroyer based on the Soldato class, to be named Ching Po or Tsing Po. This ship was to have a gun armament of two 76 mm and four 47 mm guns, and was designed to use mixed fuel, with one boiler being coal-fired and two being oil-fired. In 1912, the under-construction ship was acquired by Italy, and renamed Ascaro. The ship's armament was revised to conform with the rest of the class, but the ship retained its non-standard machinery.

== Service ==
The Soldato class were the most modern destroyers in the Regia Marina when the Italo-Turkish War broke out. Soldato-class destroyers took place in both the Battle of Preveza, where Italian destroyers, including Artigliere and Corazziere sank three Turkish torpedo boats. and the Battle of Kunfuda Bay, where the protected cruiser Piemonte, together with Artigliere and Garibaldino sank seven gunboats.

One ship, Garibaldino, was lost following a collision on 16 July 1918. The remaining ships were reclassified as torpedo boats on 1 July 1921 and were gradually discarded through the 1920s and early 1930s, with the final ship, Fuciliere stricken on 15 December 1932.

== Ships ==
Artigliere group

Ship	Laid down	Launched	Completed	Operational History
Artigliere	24 July 1905	18 January 1907	26 August 1907	Stricken 14 June 1923
Bersagliere	13 July 1905	2 October 1906	13 April 1907	Stricken 5 July 1923
Corazziere	23 October 1905	11 December 1909	16 May 1910	Sticken 1 June 1928
Garibaldino	23 October 1905	12 February 1910	1 June 1910	Sank following collision with trawler Cygnet (Note: Fraccaroli states that the collision was with the British destroyer HMS Cygnet HMS Cygnet was based in British waters during the First World War, however, and so is unlikely to be the ship involved.) off Villefranche-sur-Mer 16 July 1918.
Granatiere	24 July 1905	27 October 1906	18 April 1907	Stricken 3 November 1927
Lanciere	24 July 1905	27 February 1907	1 August 1907	Stricken 4 March 1923

Alpino group

Ship	Laid down	Launched	Completed	Operational History
Alpino	4 December 1905	27 November 1909	1 April 1910	Stricken 1 June 1928
Carabiniere	7 November 1905	12 October 1909	26 January 1910	Stricken 7 May 1925
Fuciliere	28 October 1905	21 August 1909	26 January 1910	Stricken 15 December 1932
Pontiere	18 November 1905	3 January 1910	11 February 1910	Ran aground off Sardinia 14 September 1911, salvaged and repaired at Taranto and relaunched 1 November 1913. Stricken 1 July 1929.

Ascaro

Ship	Laid down	Launched	Completed	Operational History
Ascaro	1911	6 December 1912	21 July 1913	Stricken 31 May 1930
