= Gulf of Genoa =

Northernmost part of the Ligurian Sea

Coordinates: 44°10′N 8°55′E

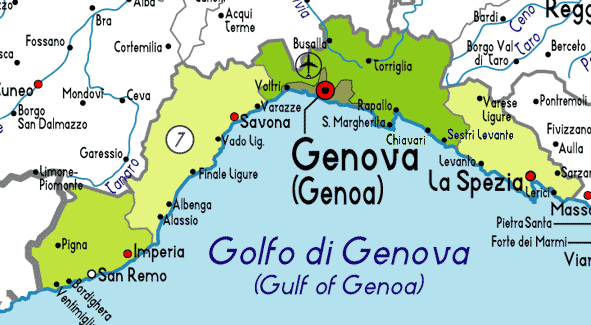
Gulf of Genoa

The Gulf of Genoa (Golfo di Genova) is the northernmost part of the Ligurian Sea. This Italian gulf is about 145 km (90 mi) wide from the city of Imperia in the west to La Spezia in the east. The largest city on its coast is Genoa, which has an important port.
