= Thornycroft =

English vehicle manufacturer

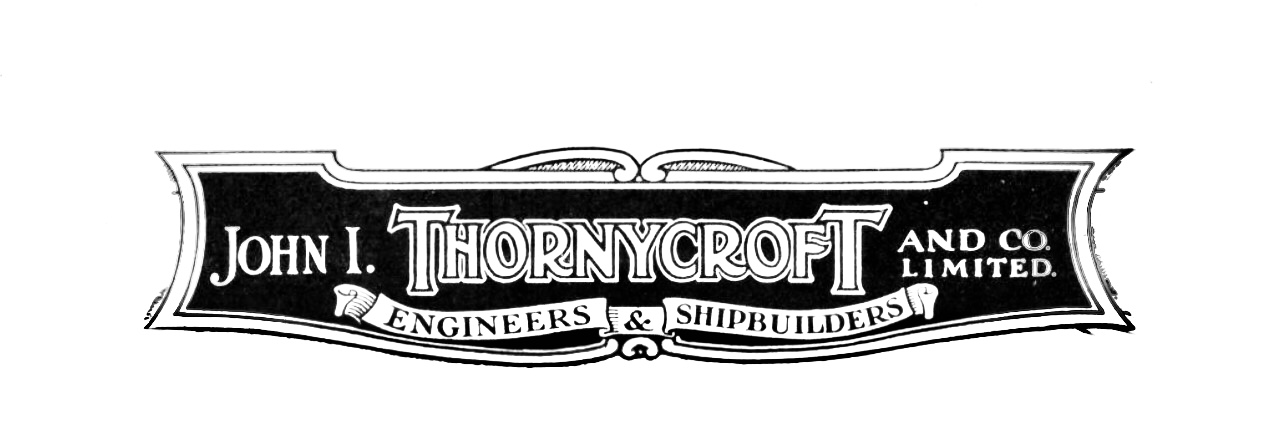

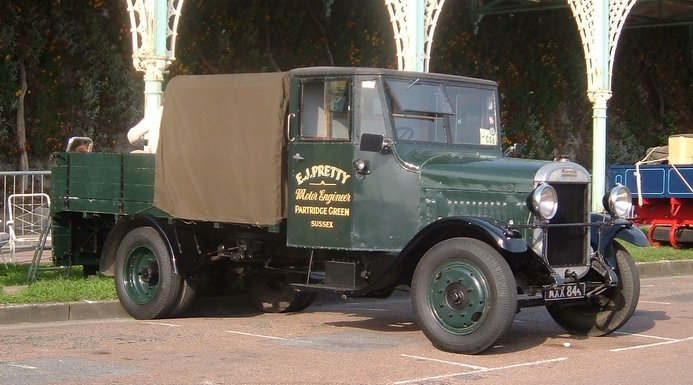
- Preserved 1934 Thornycroft Handy dropside lorry
- Type: Manufacturing
- Industry: Road vehicles
- Founded: 1896; 130 years ago in Chiswick, England
- Founder: John Isaac Thornycroft
- Defunct: 1977; 49 years ago
- Fate: Taken over
- Successor: Scammell
- Headquarters: Gerrards Cross, United Kingdom
- Owner: British Leyland

Thornycroft was an English vehicle manufacturer which built coaches, buses, and trucks from 1896 until 1977.

== History ==
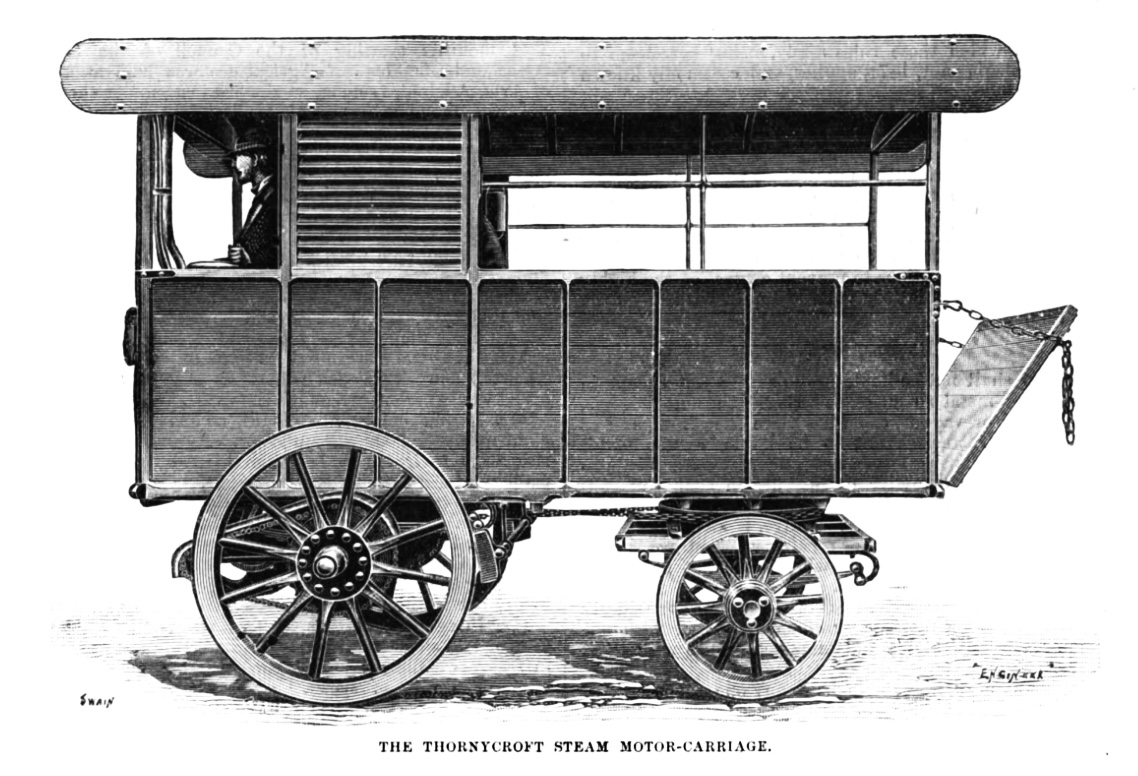
Thornycroft steam van of 1896

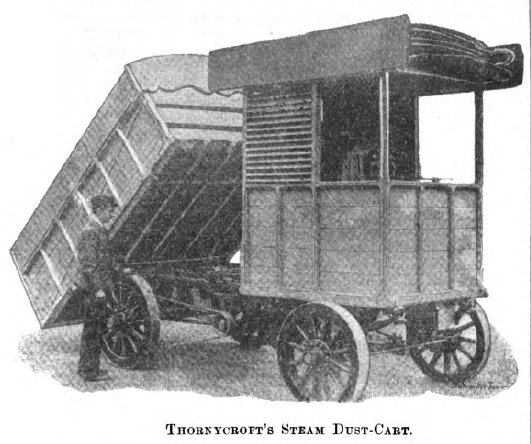
Thornycroft steam wagon of 1897 with tipper body to act as a dust-cart

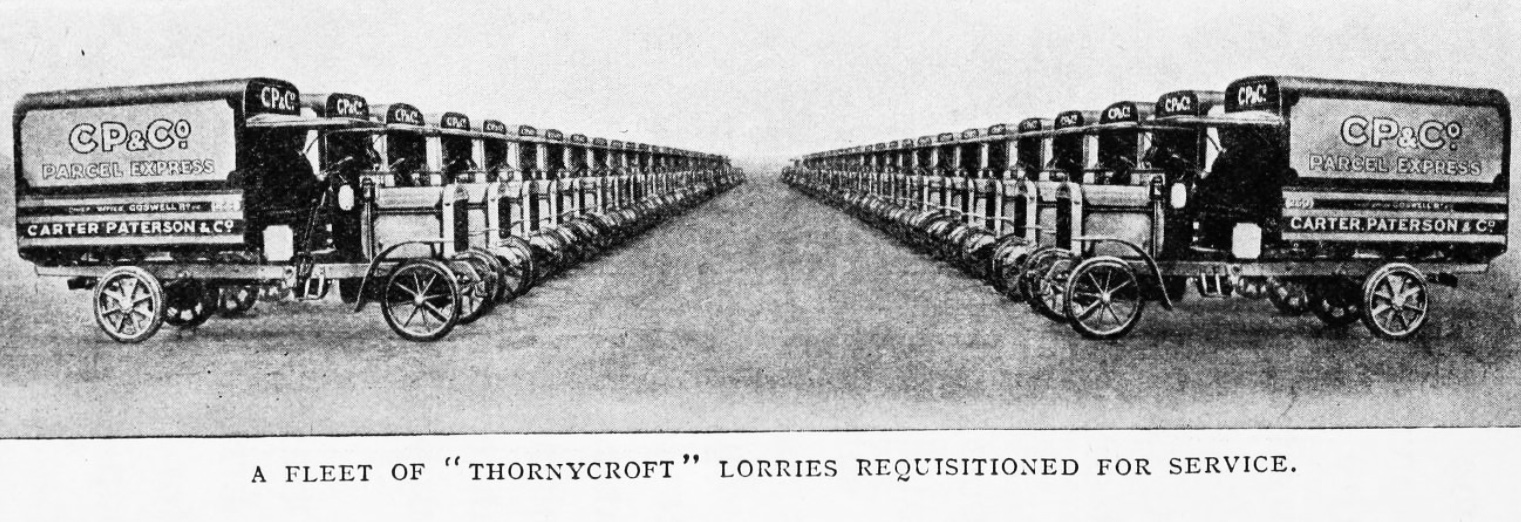
Thornycroft lorries requisitioned for service (1914).

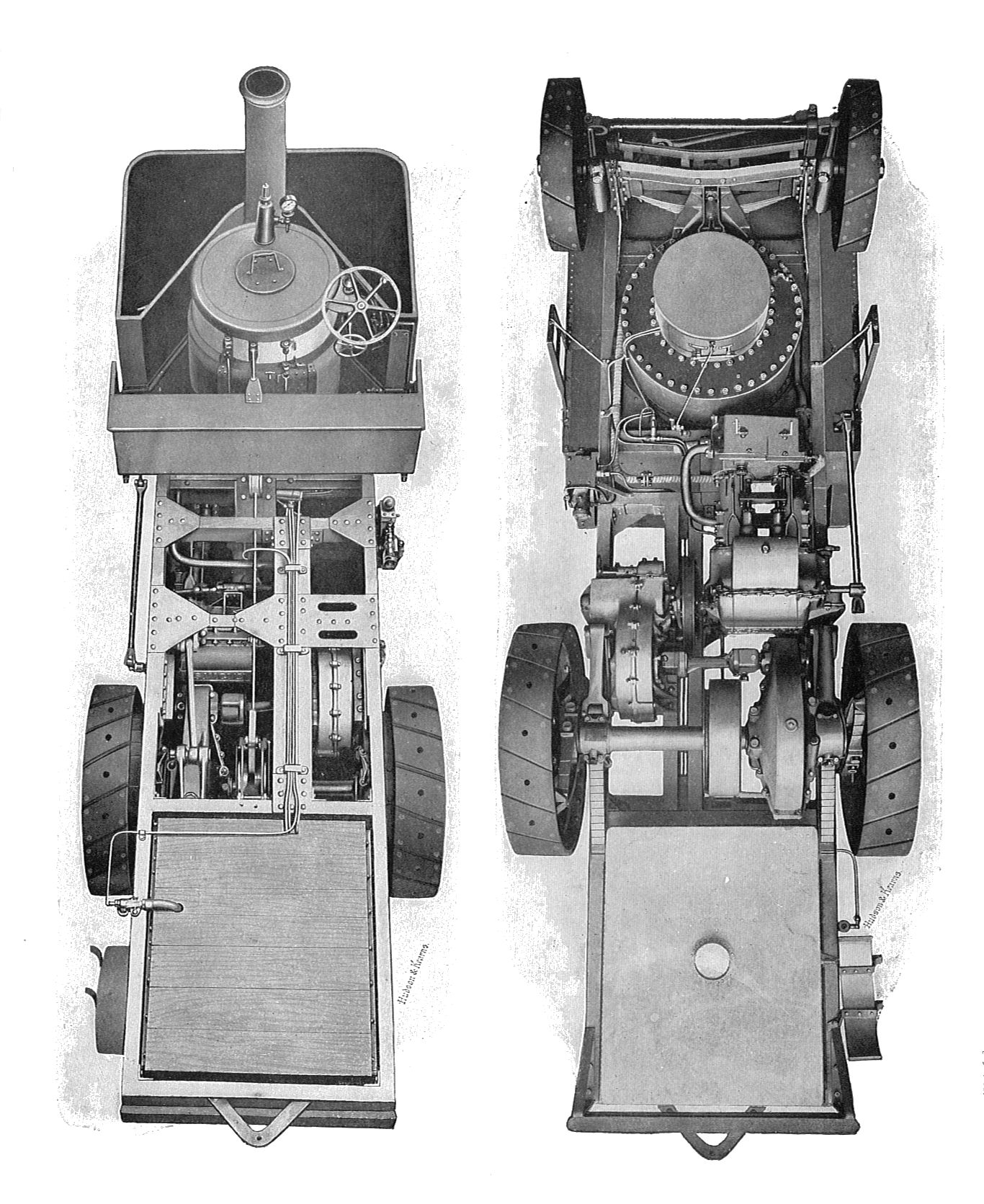
Thornycroft steam wagon of 1905

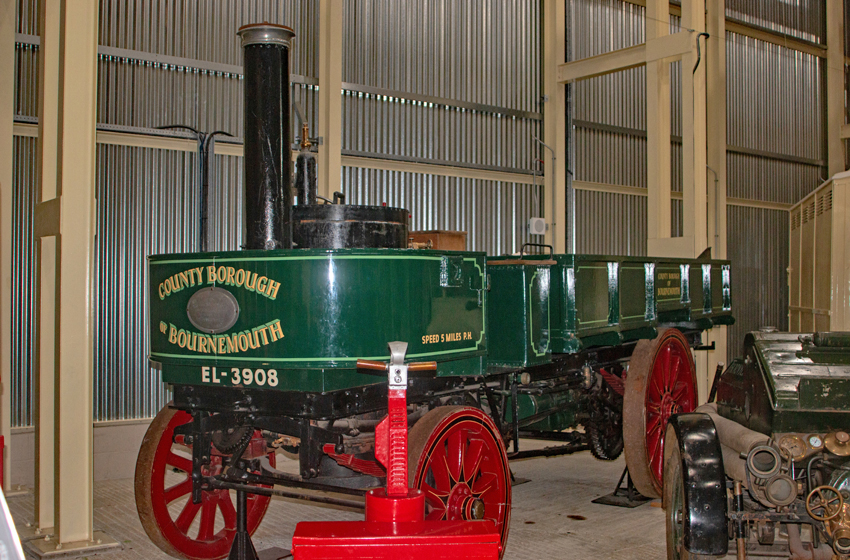
1902 Thornycroft steam lorry, ex County Borough of Bournemouth

In 1896, naval engineer John Isaac Thornycroft formed the Thornycroft Steam Carriage and Van Company which built its first steam van. This was exhibited at the Crystal Palace Show, and could carry a load of 1 ton. It was fitted with a Thornycroft marine launch-type boiler (Thornycroft announced a new boiler designed for its steam carriages in October 1897). The engine was a twin-cylinder compound engine arranged so that high-pressure steam could be admitted to the low-pressure cylinder to give extra power for hill-climbing. A modified version of the steam wagon with a 6-cubic-yard tipper body was developed for Chiswick council in 1896 and went into service as a very early self-propelled dust-cart. While the original 1896 wagon had front-wheel drive with rear-wheel steering, the tipper dust-cart had rear-wheel drive and front-wheel steering. The Thornycroft tipper was built by the Bristol Wagon & Carriage Works, though engined by Thornycroft.

Thornycroft's first petrol vehicle was built in 1902, and the company completed the move into internal combustion engine power in 1907.

Thornycroft's Basingstoke factory supplied nearly 5,000 motor vehicles for the World War I effort. It also provided large numbers of engines of various powers to the Admiralty, War Office and other government departments at the beginning of the war and for the next two years. Thereafter the Basingstoke factory manufactured marine engines for the Coastal Motor Boats being built at the John I. Thornycroft & Company works in Woolston, Southampton. The 180HP 6-cylinder Thornycroft marine engine was also used in 20 petrol shunters made for war use by Manning Wardle & Co. Thornycroft also made the Thornycroft depth-charge thrower for anti-submarine warfare.

In 1924, the War Office, anticipating the immediate need for motorised transport in the event of another war, set up a subsidy scheme whereby purchasers of approved vehicles would receive a £120 subsidy per vehicle with the proviso that the War Office could buy the vehicles at a pre-arranged price when needed. The Thornycroft A1 chassis was chosen for this scheme.

From 1931, Thornycroft used descriptive names for its vehicle range. During World War II the company designed the Terrapin and other war-related vehicles.

In 1948, the company name was changed to Transport Equipment (Thornycroft) Ltd to prevent confusion with the shipbuilding Thornycroft company. The company was well known for providing fire engine chassis, with multi-axle drive for uses such as airports. A limited number of 4x4 chassis were also provided to Worcester-based fire engine manufacturer, Carmichael for sale to civilian brigades in the 1950s.

Thornycroft was taken over on 1 March 1961 by AEC parent Associated Commercial Vehicles (ACV), with production limited to Antars, Big Bens and Nubians, although the Thornycroft-designed six-speed constant mesh gearbox was used in AEC and later medium weight Albion and Leyland trucks. ACV was taken over by Leyland in 1962. Leyland already had a specialist vehicle unit in Scammell. Vehicle production at Basingstoke ceased in 1969 with production transferred to Scammell at Watford. The factory continued to manufacture gearboxes. It was sold in 1972 to Eaton Corporation.

== Models ==
=== Bus and coach ===
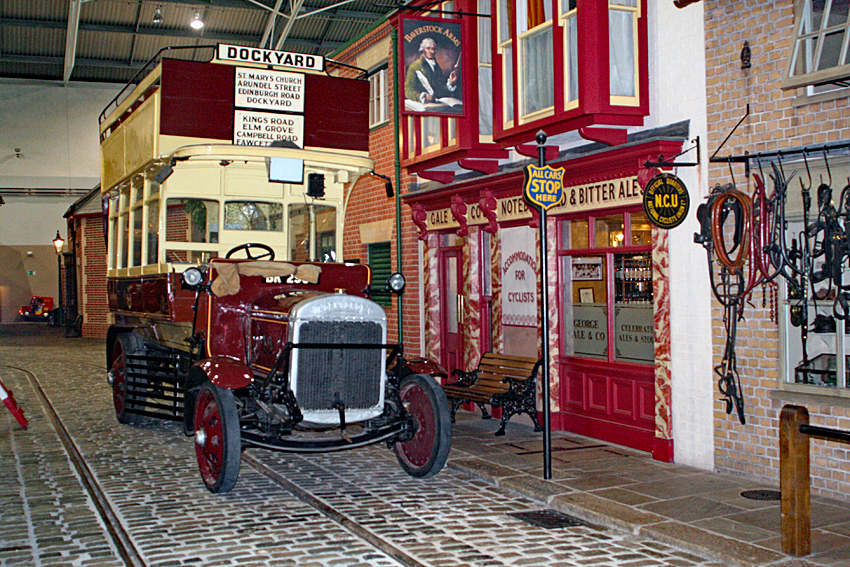
Thornycroft Type J bus

- Type J
- Beautyride
- Boudicea
- Cygnet (Single Deck)
- Daring (Double Deck)
- Lightning
- Nippy
- Patrician

=== Lorry ===
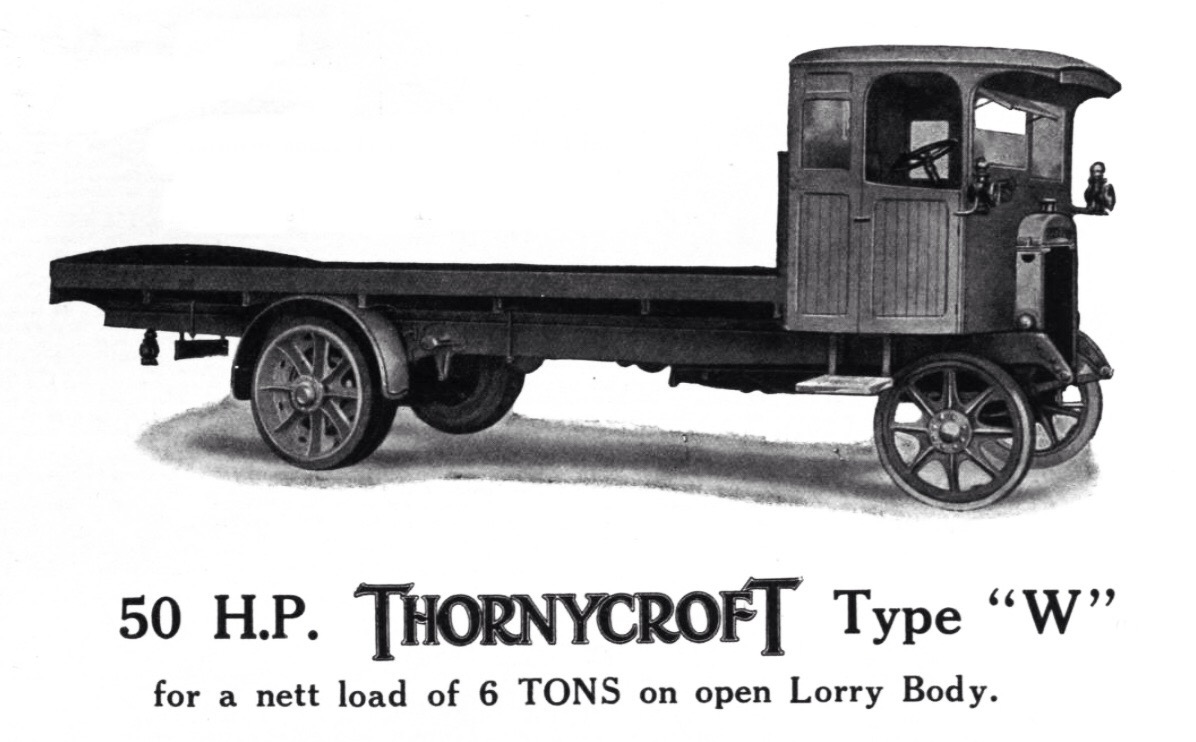
Thornycroft Type W (1920-1925)

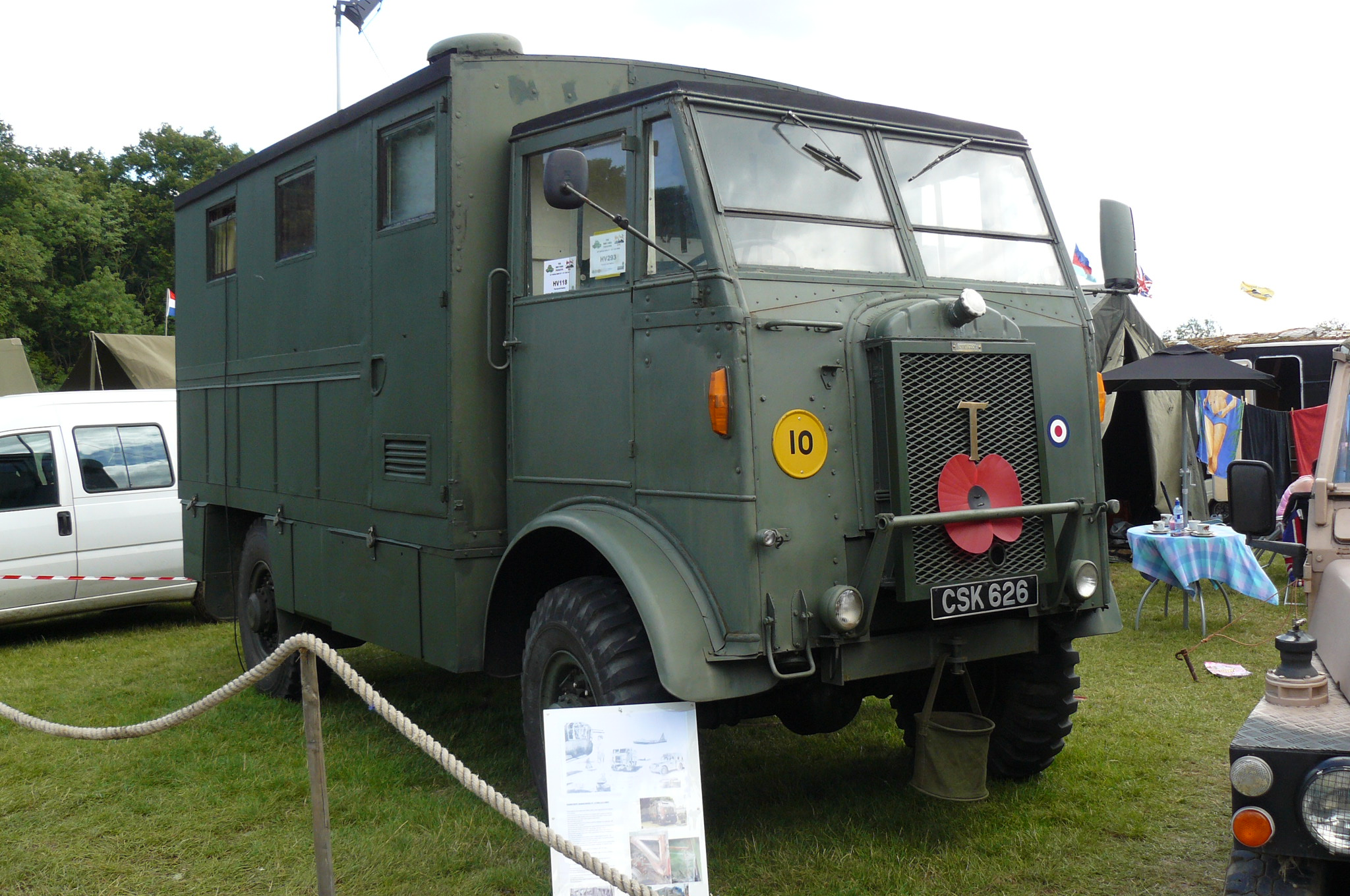
Thornycroft Nubian

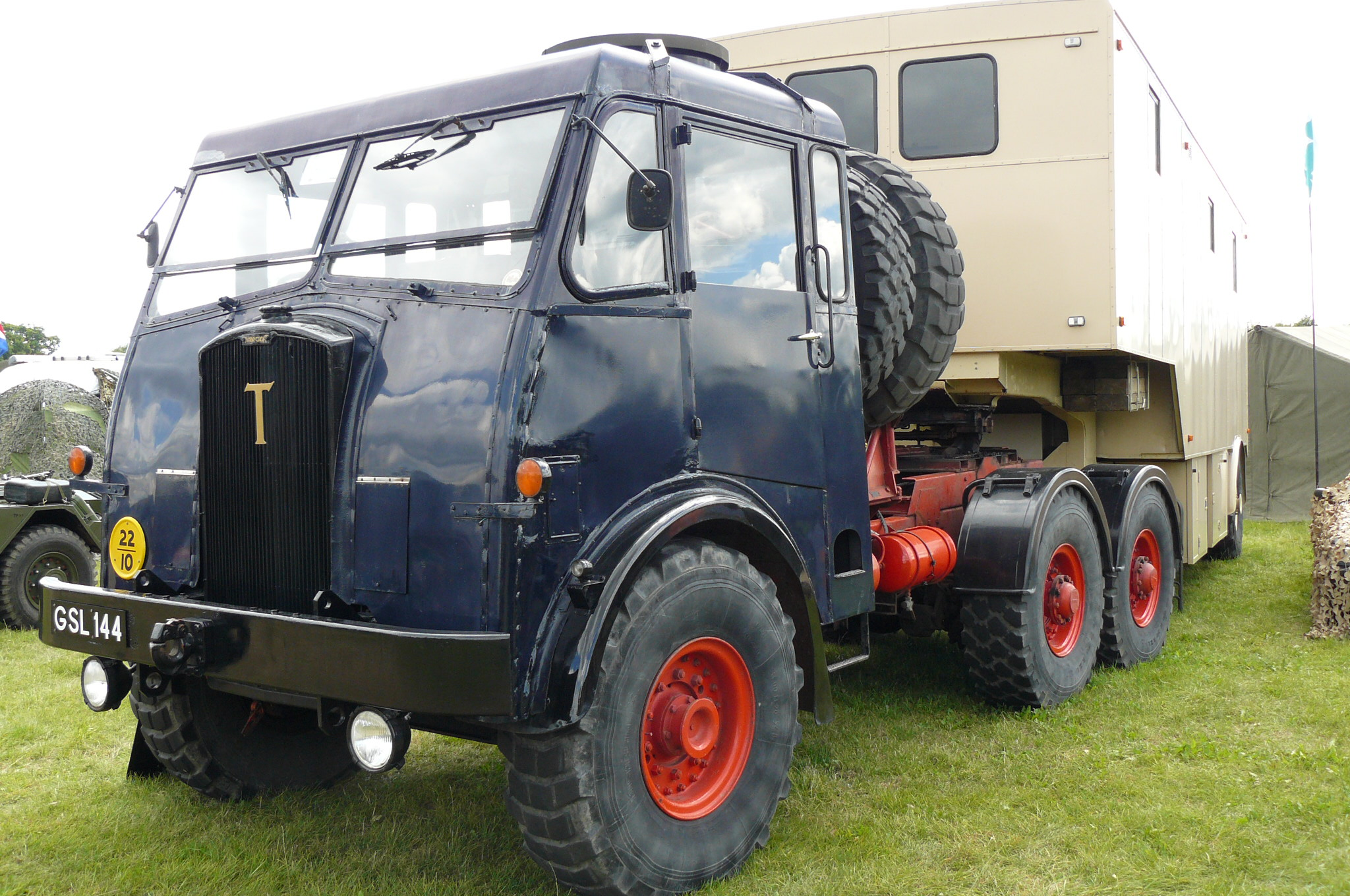
Thornycroft Big Ben

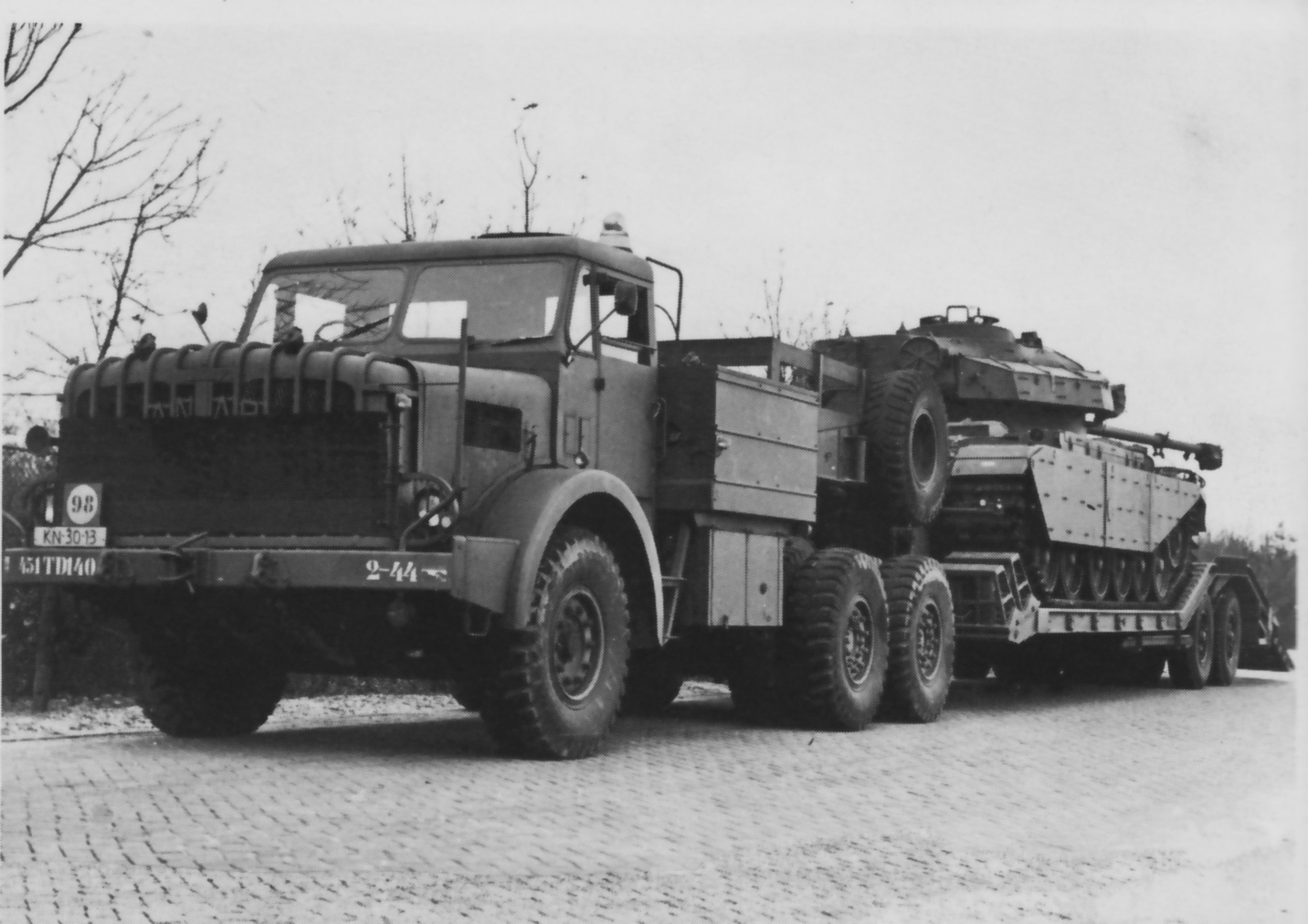
Thornycroft Antar

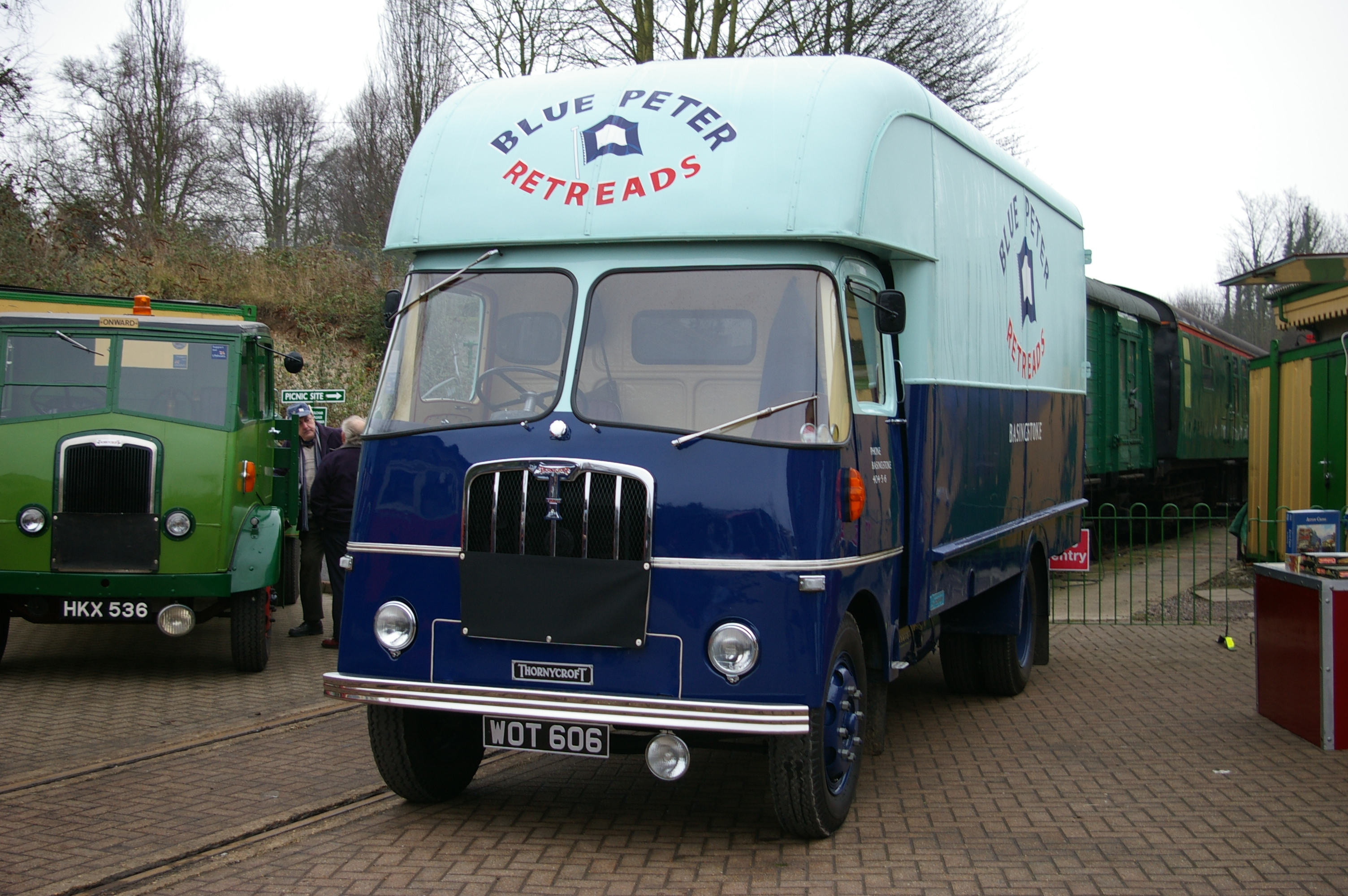
Thornycroft Swift

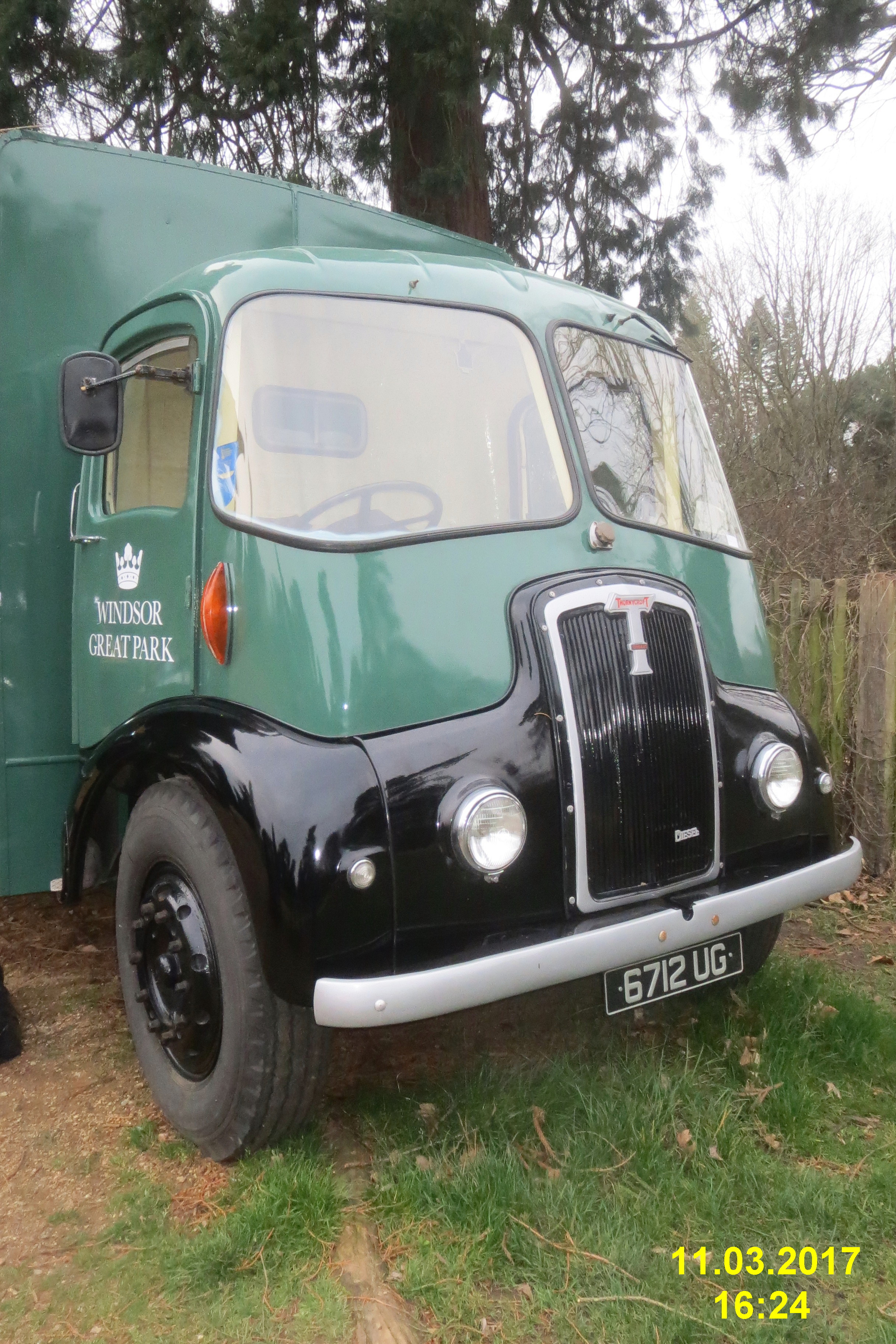
Thornycroft Trident

- Type J 40 hp, 1913
- Type K 30 hp, 1913
- Type W 50 hp, (1920-1925)
- Hathi, 1924 – four-wheel drive artillery tractor for the army
- A1 Subsidy, 1924
- A1 RSW / A3 RSW, – an off-road capable rigid six-wheeler to an army specification, 1926
- A2
- QC / Dreadnought, 1930 – 12 ton rigid six-wheel chassis.
- Hardy
- Dandy
- Sturdy - 5/6 tonner
- Trusty - 8 ton forward control 4 wheeler
- Bullfinch
- Strenuous
- Mastiff
- Tartar 3-ton 6x4, both civilian & military versions and production (3,000 - 4,000) between 1938 and 1945.
- Taurus
- Iron Duke
- Amazon
- Stag
- Bulldog
- Jupiter - 6.5 ton
- Nubian – 3-ton vehicle available as 4 x 4, 6 x 4, 6 x 6
- Big Ben
- Antar – 85-ton – 6 x 4 pipeline and tank transporter
- Swift
- Trident

=== Trolleybuses ===
- MS1 (1931)
- MS2 (1932-40; 1947-51)
- MS2C (1940-1942)
- MS3 (1934)
- MF1 (1934-36)
- MF2 (1934-40)
- MF2A (1933-40)
- W (1943-48)
- F4 (1948-52)
- S7 (1948-50)
- MF2B (1950-62)
- F4A (1952-61)
- S7A (1959)

== See also ==
- Thornycroft military vehicles
- Thornycroft Athletic F.C.
