= List of wrecked or lost ships of the Ottoman steam navy =

This is a list of Ottoman Navy steamships lost during Italo-Ottoman War, Balkan Wars and World War I:

== Italo-Ottoman War ==
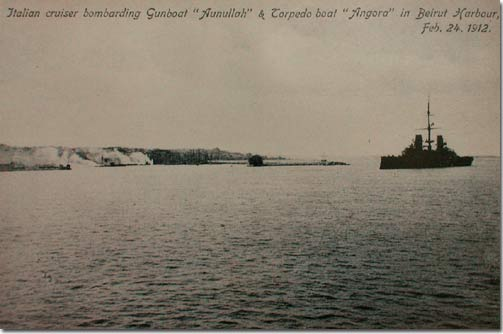
Italian cruiser bombarding Ottoman vessels in Beirut harbor.

Name	Location	Date	Cause
Antalya (torpedo boat)	Preveza	29 Sept. 1911	Scuttled by crew after the Battle of Preveza. Salvaged by Greeks on 29 Nov. 1912. Royal Hellenic Navy Nikopolis in 1913.
Tokad (torpedo boat)	Preveza	29 Sept. 1911	Run aground by crew at the Battle of Preveza. Salvaged by Greeks on 29 Nov. 1912. Royal Hellenic Navy Totoi in 1913.
Hamidiye (torpedo boat)	Reşadiye (present day: Igoumenitsa)	30 Sep. 1911	Sunk by gunfire from Italian destroyers at the Battle of Preveza.
Alpagot (torpedo boat)	Reşadiye, (present day: Igoumenitsa)	30 Sep. 1911	Sunk by gunfire from Italian destroyers at the Battle of Preveza.
Kastamonu (gunboat)	Konfida (Kunfuda, present day: Al Qunfudhah, Al Bahah Province, Saudi Arabia), Red Sea	7 Jan. 1912	Sunk by gunfire from Italian cruiser Piemonte and destroyer Artigliere at the Battle of Kunfuda Bay.
Gökçedağ (gunboat)	Konfida, Red Sea	7 Jan. 1912	Sunk by gunfire from Italian cruiser Piemonte and destroyer Artigliere at the Battle of Kunfuda Bay.
Refahiye (gunboat)	Konfida, Red Sea	7 Jan. 1912	Sunk by gunfire from Italian cruiser Piemonte and destroyer Artigliere at the Battle of Kunfuda Bay
Ayintab (gunboat)	Konfida, Red Sea	7 Jan. 1912	Sunk by gunfire from Italian cruiser Piemonte and destroyer Artigliere at the Battle of Kunfuda Bay
Ordu (gunboat)	Konfida, Red Sea	7 Jan. 1912	Sunk by gunfire from Italian cruiser Piemonte and destroyer Artigliere at the Battle of Kunfuda Bay
Bafra (gunboat)	Konfida, Red Sea	7 Jan. 1912	Sunk by gunfire from Italian cruiser Piemonte and destroyer Artigliere at the Battle of Kunfuda Bay.
Avnillah (armoured corvette)	33°54′N 35°31′E, Port of Beirut	24 Feb. 1912	Sunk by gunfire from Italian cruiser Giuseppe Garibaldi and Varese at the Battle of Beirut.
Ankara (torpedo boat)	33°54′N 35°31′E, Port of Beirut	24 Feb. 1912	Sunk by gunfire from Italian Giuseppe Garibaldi and Varese at the Battle of Beirut.

== Balkan Wars ==
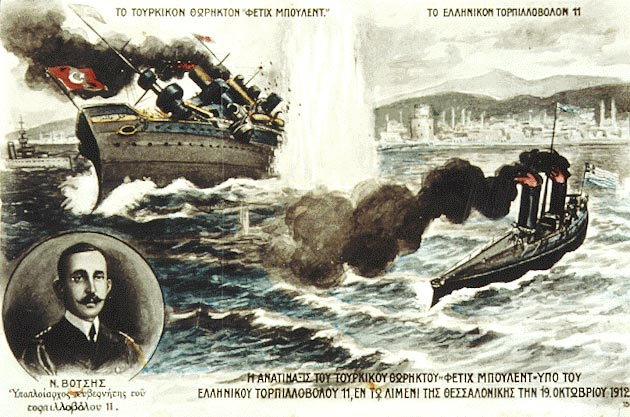
The sinking of the Ottoman armoured corvette Feth-i Bülend as depicted in a lithograph. The commander of torpedo boat No 11 Nikolaos Votsis is shown in the lower left corner.

Name	Location	Date	Cause
No 9 (gunboat)	Preveza	20 Oct. 1912	Scuttled by crew.
No 10 (gunboat)	Preveza	20 Oct. 1912	Scuttled by crew.
Feth-i Bülend (armoured corvette)	Port of Thessaloniki	31 Oct. 1912	Sunk by torpedo by Greek torpedo boat No 11 with the loss of seven crew, including ship's imam.
Trabzon (armed steamer)	off Lesbos	9 Nov. 1912	Sunk by torpedo by Greek torpedo boat No 14. Captain and engineer were killed in the explosion.
Âsâr-ı Tevfik (armoured corvette)	41°25′N 28°29′E, near Çernes, Black Sea	8-11 Feb. 1913	Run aground on an uncharted sandbank while approaching to Podima (present day: Yalıköy, Çatalca).

== First World War ==
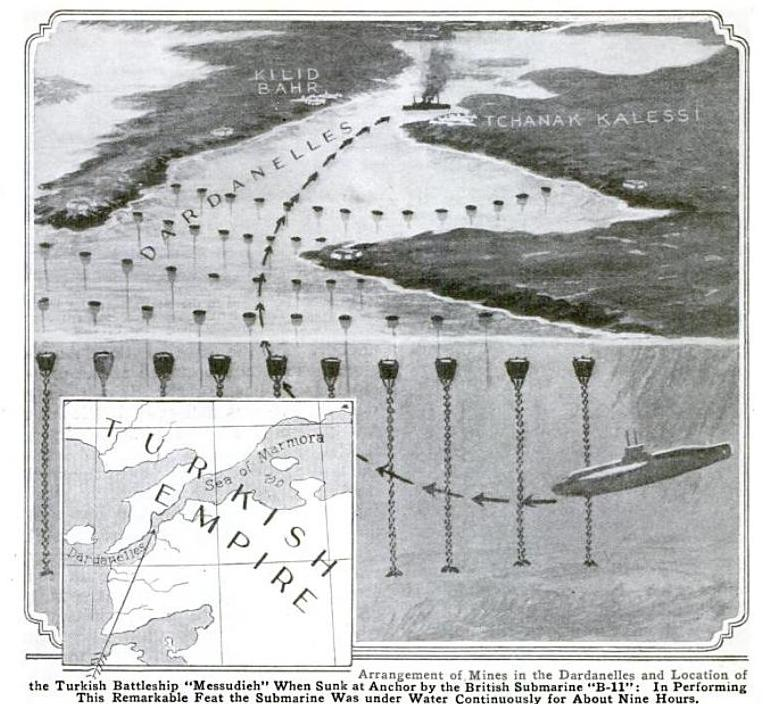
Graphic depiction of the raid by British submarine HMS B11, commanded by Norman Douglas Holbrook, on the Dardanelles leading to the sinking of the Ottoman armoured frigate Mesudiye

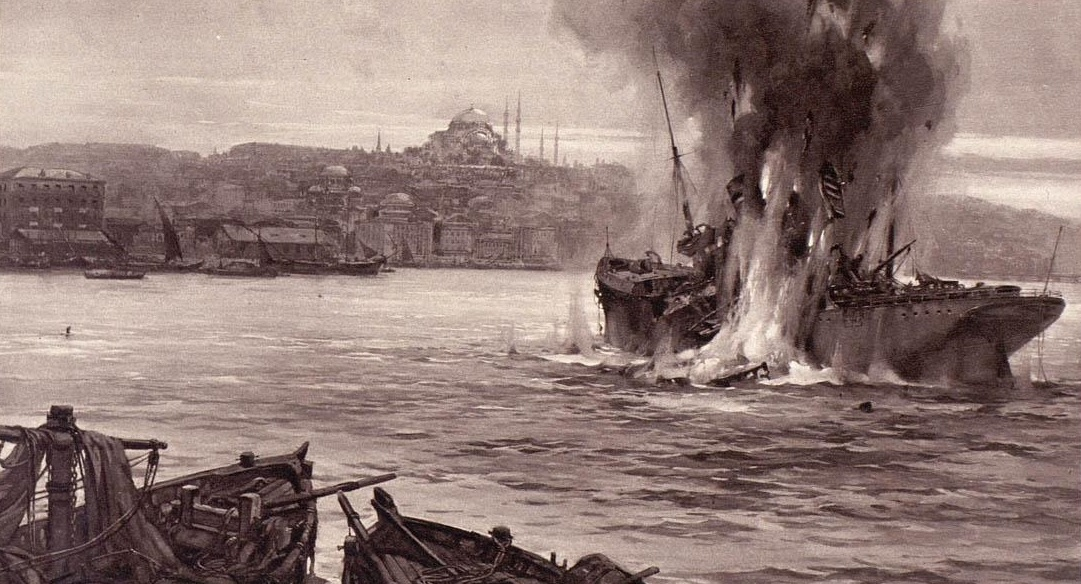
HMS E11 commanded by Martin Dunbar-Nasmith torpedoes the Stamboul off Constantinople, 25 May 1915. Drawing from the Illustrated London News.

Name	Location	Date	Cause
Nilüfer (minelayer)	about 10 miles northwest of the Bosporus	19 Nov. 1914	Sunk by Russian mine. 55 lives lost.
Mesudiye (armoured frigate)	near Erenköy	26 Dec. 1914	Sunk by British submarine HMS B11.
Mecidiye (protected cruiser)	15 nautical miles off Vorontsoskiy Lighthouse, Odessa	3 Apr. 1915	Sunk by Russian mine. Salvaged by Russians on 8 June 1915. Commissioned as Prut Imperial Russian Navy.
Demirhisar (torpedo boat)	Chios	16 Apr. 1915	Beached, the crew of one German and 23 Ottomans in interned by the Greeks. Later Blown up by the British at Chios.
Peleng-i Deryâ (torpedo gunboat)	near Bakırköy	23 May 1915	Torpedoed and sunk in shallow water by British submarine HMS E11
Nûr-ül Bâhir (gunboat)	near Mürefte	1 May 1915	Sunk by the British submarine HMS E14 with loss four officers and thirty-two crew. Twenty-nine men are rescued by Zuhaf.
Barbaros Hayreddin (battleship)	40°27′N 26°48′E, Sea of Marmara	8 Aug. 1915	Sunk by British submarine HMS E11 in the Sea of Marmara. 253 lives lost.
Samsun (minelayer)	Erdek	14 Aug. 1915	Sunk by British submarine HMS E2 with two officer and eight crew.
Yozgat (gunboat)	near Kefken Island, Kandıra	9 Dec. 1915	Sunk by gunfire from Russian Derzky-class destroyers Derzky, Gnevny and Bespokoyny at Second Battle of Kirpen Island
Taşköprü (gunboat)	near Kefken Island, Kandıra	9 Dec. 1915	Sunk by gunfire from Russian Derzky-class destroyers Derzky, Gnevny and Bespokoyny at Second Battle of Kirpen Island.
Yarhisar (destroyer)	off Yalova	3 Dec. 1915	Sunk by British submarine HMS E11.
Kütahya (torpedo boat)	north of Karaburun, Arnavutköy	12 Sep. 1916	Sunk by mine north of Karaburun
Gayret-i Vataniye (destroyer)	Varna	30 Oct. 1916	Grounded off Varna. Blown up by crew after all useful equipment had been removed.
Yadigâr-ı Millet (destroyer)	İstinye	9–10 Jul. 1917	Bombed and sunk by British aircraft at İstinye. Refloated and drydocked at Tersâne-i Âmire on 24 Oct. 1917.
Hamidabad (torpedo gunboat)	near İğneada	31 Oct. 1917	Sunk by Russian Derzky-class destroyers Pylky and Bystry.
Midilli (cruiser)	40°05′N 26°02′E, near Imbros	20 Jan. 1918	Sunk after hitting four mines during the Battle of Imbros.
