= Italian destroyer Corazziere (1909) =

Italian Soldato-class destroyer

History

Italy
- Name: Corazziere
- Namesake: Cuirassier, a cavalryman equipped with a cuirass, sword, and pistols
- Builder: Gio. Ansaldo & C., Genoa, Kingdom of Italy
- Laid down: 23 October 1905
- Launched: 11 December 1909
- Completed: 16 May 1910
- Commissioned: 1910
- Stricken: 1 June 1928
- Fate: Scrapped

General characteristics
- Displacement: 395–424 long tons (401–431 t)
- Length: 64.4 m (211 ft 3 in) wl; 65.0 m (213 ft 3 in) oa
- Beam: 6.1 m (20 ft 0 in)
- Draught: 2.1 m (6 ft 11 in)
- Propulsion: 2 × Vertical triple-expansion steam engines; 3× Thornycroft boilers; 6,000 ihp (4,474 kW); As built: 95 t (93 long tons; 105 short tons) coal; Later: 65 t (64 long tons; 72 short tons) fuel oil
- Speed: 28.5 knots (52.8 km/h; 32.8 mph)
- Complement: 55
- Armament: 4× 76 mm (3 in)/40 guns; 3× 450 mm (17.7 in) torpedo tubes; 10 mines

Corazziere ("Cuirassier") was a Soldato-class ("Soldier"-class) destroyer of the Italian Regia Marina (Royal Navy). Commissioned in 1910, she served in the Italo-Turkish War and World War I. She was stricken in 1928.

== Design ==
Corazziere was powered by two sets of triple expansion steam engines fed by three Thornycroft water-tube boilers, producing an estimated 6,000 indicated horsepower (4,474 kW) and driving two propeller shafts. As built, she could reach a maximum speed of 28.5 knots (52.8 km/h; 32.8 mph). Originally, she had a fuel capacity of 95 tonnes (93 long tons) of coal, giving her a range of 1,500 nautical miles (2,800 km; 1,700 mi) at 12 knots (22 km/h; 14 mph) and 400 nautical miles (740 km; 460 mi) at 23.5 knots (43.5 km/h; 27.0 mph); she later was converted to burn fuel oil, with a fuel capacity of 65 tonnes (64 long tons) of oil. She was fitted with four 76-millimetre (3 in)/40 calibre guns and three 450-millimetre (17.7 in) torpedo tubes.

== Construction and commissioning ==
Corazziere was laid down on 23 October 1905 at the Gio. Ansaldo & C. shipyard in Genoa, Italy. She was launched on 11 December 1909 and completed on 16 May 1910. She was commissioned in 1910.

== Service history ==
=== Italo-Turkish War ===
The Italo-Turkish War began on 29 September 1911 with the Kingdom of Italy′s declaration of war on the Ottoman Empire. At the time, Corazziere was in reserve at Taranto. One of the first clashes of the war, the Battle of Preveza, began on the afternoon of 29 September, when a force of Italian ships engaged Ottoman torpedo boats off what was then the Ionian Sea of the Ottoman Empire.

Corazziere joined the battle on its second day when, according to some sources, she was operating off Igoumenitsa with other Italian ships on the morning of 30 September 1911 and the Italians sighted a force of Ottoman torpedo boats leaving the port of Preveza. When they reported the sighting to higher command, they received orders to let the torpedo boats move away from the coast and then, taking advantage of the greater speed of the Italian ships, close with them and sink them. The Italian ships managed to surround the torpedo boats, which at that point attempted to escape at full steam towards the south instead of heading back toward Preveza. The Italians found this suspicious, and while Corazziere and her sister ship Artigliere pursued the torpedo boats, the destroyer Alpino steamed north to conduct a reconnaissance of the approaches to Preveza, where she discovered steamers attempting to reach Prevenza while the Ottoman torpedo boats distracted the Italian ships, and she seized one of the steamers. Meanwhile, Corazziere and Artigliere closed with the Ottoman torpedo boats, which opened fire ineffectively. Corazziere and Artigliere returned fire, reducing the torpedo boats Alpagot and Hamidiye to wrecks and inducing an ammunition magazine explosion aboard one of them. The two torpedo boats struggled back to port and sank there, and the two Italian destroyers rescued some members of their crews. Those members of their crews who reached a nearby beach opened rifle fire on the two Italian destroyers, which returned fire and silenced them. Other Ottoman torpedo boats that had been operating with Alpagot and Hamidiye returned safely to port. Meanwhile, Corazziere and Artigliere captured the armed yacht Teties (referred to as "Thetis" or "Tarabulus" in some sources); the yacht was later incorporated into the Regia Marina as the gunboat Capitano Verri.

In a 1912 magazine article and a 1913 book based on contemporary sources, United States Navy Commodore W. H. Beehler offers a different version of the events of 30 September 1911. He states that an officer from Corazziere went ashore at Prevenza on the evening of 29 September 1911 and ascertained the positions at which Alpagot and Hamidiye were anchored, which he reported to Capitano di fregata (Frigate Captain) Guido Biscaretti di Ruffia, the commanding officer of Artigliere and a future ammiraglio di squadra (squadron admiral). Artigliere and Corazziere penetrated the harbor on the morning of 30 September, where they sank Alpagot and Hamidiye with gunfire while they were at anchor; all but one man from the two torpedo boats' crews escaped to shore. Corazziere then made preparations to tow the armed yacht "Telied" away as a prize, and a "mob" on shore opened fire on her. She returned fire, silencing the mob and damaging the fort at Prevenza, which did not fire during the battle. The two destroyers then put back to sea with the yacht in tow, having fired 76 shells in an engagement lasting 45 minutes.

The historian Charles Stephenson offers yet another version of events. According to him, the Italians decided not to attempt an incursion into the harbor at Preveza to attack the Ottoman torpedo boat Antalya, which had reached that port at the end of the first day of the battle on 29 September, and instead proceeded to the waters off Igoumenitsa, (Note: Beehler states that the incident took place at Prevesa, not Igoumenitsa, which is contradicted by Stephenson and as well as Bernd Langensiepen and Ahmet Güleryüz, who agree that it took place at Igoumenitsa. That Beehler makes no mention of Antalya in the engagement of 30 September 1911 suggests he is incorrect.) where Alpagot and Hamidiye were anchored in the harbor. Corazziere, Alpino, and Artigliere then penetrated the harbor at Igoumenitsa on the morning of 30 September, where Artigliere and Corazziere sank Alpagot and Hamidiye with gunfire while they still were at anchor. Meanwhile, Alpino came alongside the armed yacht "Trablus," whose boilers were under repair. The yacht's crew opened her seacocks in an attempt to scuttle her and abandoned ship. Alpino sent a boarding party aboard the yacht and closed the seacocks to prevent her from sinking. The Alpino crewmen were cutting the yacht's mooring lines when civilians on shore opened fire on the boarding party, prompting Corazziere to bombard the town, silencing the civilian gunfire and damaging the fort at Igoumenitsa, which did not fire during the battle. Alpino then towed the yacht out of port.

The war ended on 18 October 1912 in an Italian victory.

=== World War I ===
World War I broke out in 1914, and Italy entered the war on the side of the Allies with its declaration of war on Austria-Hungary on 23 May 1915. At the time, Artigliere, under the command of Capitano di corvetta (Corvette Captain) Failla, was part of the 3rd Destroyer Squadron, based at Brindisi, which also included Artigliere and their sister ships Bersagliere, Garibaldino, and Lanciere. In the predawn hours of 24 May 1915, Corazziere and Bersagliere entered the waters off Grado to support the raid on Porto Buso, an incursion by the destroyer Zeffiro against the Austro-Hungarian border outpost on the island of Porto Buso in the Grado Lagoon, a part of the larger Marano Lagoon. While Zeffiro attacked the island, Corazziere and Bersagliere guarded against interference by Austro-Hungarian Navy ships and bombarded Austro-Hungarian positions.

On 29 May 1915 Artigliere, Bersagliere, Garibaldino, and Lanciere bombarded the Adria Werke chemical plant in Monfalcone, a production site for poison gases, while Corazziere, Alpino, and their sister ship Pontiere provided support. The ships carried out another bombardment of the Adria Werke on 7 June 1915.

On 23 February 1916, under the command of Capitano di corvetta (Corvette Captain) Bernotti, Corazziere joined Bersagliere and Garibaldino in escorting 12 steamers and two tugs to Durrës (known to the Italians as Durazzo) on the coast of the Principality of Albania. The British light cruiser HMS Liverpool, the French destroyer Casque, and the Italian destroyer Rosolino Pilo provided distant cover for the convoy.

Corazziere continued her World War I service without participating in any other significant events. By late October 1918, Austria-Hungary had effectively disintegrated, and the Armistice of Villa Giusti, signed on 3 November 1918, went into effect on 4 November 1918 and brought hostilities between Austria-Hungary and the Allies to an end. World War I ended a week later with an armistice between the Allies and the German Empire on 11 November 1918.

=== Post-World War I ===
Corazziere was reclassified as a torpedo boat on 1 July 1921. She was stricken from the naval register on 1 June 1928 and subsequently scrapped.
