= Italian destroyer Artigliere (1907) =

Italian Soldato-class destroyer

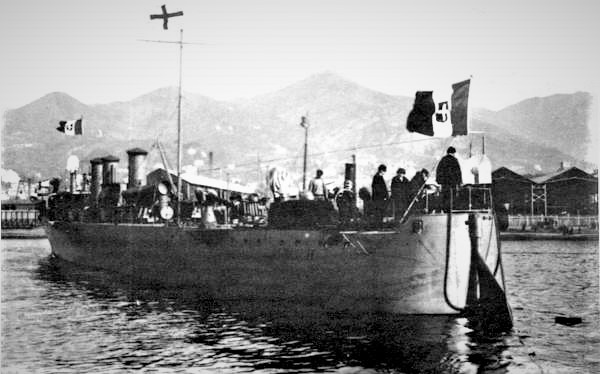

History

Italy
- Name: Artigliere
- Namesake: Artillerist, artilleryman, or gunner, a soldier who specializes in artillery
- Builder: Gio. Ansaldo & C., Genoa, Kingdom of Italy
- Laid down: 24 July 1905
- Launched: 18 January 1907
- Completed: 26 August 1907
- Commissioned: September 1907
- Stricken: 14 June 1923
- Identification: Pennant number AR
- Fate: Scrapped

General characteristics
- Displacement: 395–424 long tons (401–431 t)
- Length: 64.4 m (211 ft 3 in) wl; 65.0 m (213 ft 3 in) oa
- Beam: 6.1 m (20 ft 0 in)
- Draught: 2.1 m (6 ft 11 in)
- Propulsion: 2 × Vertical triple-expansion steam engines; 3× Thornycroft boilers; 6,000 ihp (4,474 kW); As built: 95 t (93 long tons; 105 short tons) coal; Later: 65 t (64 long tons; 72 short tons) fuel oil
- Speed: 28.5 knots (52.8 km/h; 32.8 mph)
- Complement: 55
- Armament: 4× 76 mm (3 in)/40 guns; 3× 450 mm (17.7 in) torpedo tubes; 10 mines

Artigliere ("Artillerist," "Artilleryman," or "Gunner") was a Soldato-class ("Soldier"-class) destroyer of the Italian Regia Marina (Royal Navy). Commissioned in 1907, she served in the Italo-Turkish War and World War I. She was stricken in 1923.

== Design ==
Artigliere was powered by two sets of triple expansion steam engines fed by three Thornycroft water-tube boilers, producing an estimated 6,000 indicated horsepower (4,474 kW) and driving two propeller shafts. As built, she could reach a maximum speed of 28.5 knots (52.8 km/h; 32.8 mph). Originally, she had a fuel capacity of 95 tonnes (93 long tons) of coal, giving her a range of 1,500 nautical miles (2,800 km; 1,700 mi) at 12 knots (22 km/h; 14 mph) and 400 nautical miles (740 km; 460 mi) at 23.5 knots (43.5 km/h; 27.0 mph); she later was converted to burn fuel oil, with a fuel capacity of 65 tonnes (64 long tons) of oil. She was fitted with four 76-millimetre (3 in)/40 calibre guns and three 450-millimetre (17.7 in) torpedo tubes.

== Construction and commissioning ==
Artigliere was laid down on 24 July 1905 at the Gio. Ansaldo & C. shipyard in Genoa, Italy. She was launched on 18 January 1907 and completed on 26 August 1907. She was commissioned in September 1907.

== Service history ==
=== 1907–1911 ===
A devastating earthquake in the Strait of Messina and subsequent tsunami struck Messina, Sicily, and Reggio Calabria on the Italian mainland on 28 December 1908. On 30 December 1908 Artigliere, her sister ship Bersagliere, and the battleship Vittorio Emanuele arrived at Messina to assist in rescue operations.

=== Italo-Turkish War ===
The Italo-Turkish War began on 29 September 1911 with the Kingdom of Italy′s declaration of war on the Ottoman Empire. At the time, Artigliere was in reserve at Taranto under the command of Capitano di fregata Frigate Captain Guido Biscaretti di Ruffia, a future ammiraglio di squadra (squadron admiral). On the afternoon of 29 September Artigliere took part in one of the first clashes of the war, the Battle of Preveza, when she, along with the destroyers Alpino, Carabiniere, and Zeffiro and the torpedo boat Spica engaged the Ottoman Navy torpedo boats Antalya and Tokad as they attempted to leave the port of Preveza on what then was the Ionian Sea coast of the Ottoman Empire. According to some accounts, the Italian ships attacked the two torpedo boats at 14:00, and Artigliere seriously damaged Tokad and pursued her into the anchorage as she attempted to return to Preveza. Meanwhile, Carabiniere, Alpino, Spiga, and Zeffiro surrounded Antalya. Hit repeatedly, seriously damaged, and on fire, with four members of her crew killed in action and numerous other crewmen wounded, Antalya struck her colors and ran herself aground on a nearby beach. As Antalya′s crew abandoned ship, members of Alpino′s crew boarded and captured her and removed her flag and her only usable gun, after which Alpino finished her off with gunfire. Carabiniere, Alpino, Spiga, and Zeffiro then joined Artigliere in the harbor and sank Tokad and an Ottoman gunboat. As the Italian ships departed, the crew of the Greek steamer Marte cheered them.

In a 1912 magazine article and a 1913 book based on contemporary sources, United States Navy Commodore W. H. Beehler offers a different version of the events of 29 September 1911. According to Beehler, the Italian ships sighted Antalya and Tokad in the Ionian Sea between Corfu and Preveza, steering north-northwestward, at either 15:00 or 16:00. The Italians opened fire, and the Ottoman ships returned fire only feebly. Tokad steamed northward chased by three Italian destroyers, while Antalya headed south with two Italian destroyers in pursuit. Hit 15 times and on fire, Tokad beached herself near Nicopolis and was totally destroyed, with her commanding officer and eight of her sailors either killed by the Italian gunfire or drowned. Meanwhile, Antalya reached Preveza undamaged. The Italian destroyers were undamaged and fired 100 76-millimetre rounds during the engagement.

The battle continued on the morning of 30 September 1911 when, according to some sources, Artigliere was operating off Igoumenitsa with other Italian ships when the Italians sighted a force of Ottoman torpedo boats leaving Preveza. When they reported the sighting to higher command, they received orders to let the torpedo boats move away from the coast and then, taking advantage of the greater speed of the Italian ships, close with them and sink them. The Italian ships managed to surround the torpedo boats, which at that point attempted to escape at full steam towards the south instead of heading back toward Preveza. The Italians found this suspicious, and while Artigliere and her sister ship Corazziere pursued the torpedo boats, Alpino steamed north to conduct a reconnaissance of the approaches to Preveza, where she discovered steamers attempting to reach Prevenza while the Ottoman torpedo boats distracted the Italian ships, and she seized one of the steamers. Meanwhile, Artigliere and Corazziere closed with the Ottoman torpedo boats, which opened fire ineffectively. Artigliere and her sister ships Corazziere returned fire, reducing the torpedo boats Alpagot and Hamidiye to wrecks and inducing an ammunition magazine explosion aboard one of them. The two torpedo boats struggled back to port and sank there, and the two Italian destroyers rescued some members of their crews. Those members of their crews who reached a nearby beach opened rifle fire on the two Italian destroyers, which returned fire and silenced them. Other Ottoman torpedo boats that had been operating with Alpagot and Hamidiye returned safely to port. Meanwhile, Artigliere and Corazziere captured the armed yacht Teties (referred to as "Thetis" or "Tarabulus" in some sources) and captured her; she was later incorporated into the Regia Marina as the gunboat Capitano Verri.

Beehler provides a different narrative stating an officer from Corazziere went ashore at Prevenza on the evening of 29 September 1911 and ascertained the positions at which Alpagot and Hamidiye were anchored, which he reported to di Ruffia. Artigliere and Corazziere penetrated the harbor on the morning of 30 September, where Artigliere and Corazziere sank Alpagot and Hamidiye with gunfire while they were at anchor; all but one man from the two torpedo boats' crews escaped to shore. Corazziere then made preparations to tow the armed yacht "Telied" away as a prize, and a "mob" on shore opened fire on her. She returned fire, silencing the mob and damaging the fort at Prevenza, which did not fire during the battle. The two destroyers then put back to sea with the yacht in tow, having fired 76 shells in an engagement lasting 45 minutes.

The historian Charles Stephenson offers yet another version of events. According to him, the Italians decided not to attempt an incursion into the harbor at Preveza to attack Antalya after she reached that port on 29 September and instead proceeded to the waters off Igoumenitsa, (Note: Beehler states that the incident took place at Prevesa, not Igoumenitsa, which is contradicted by Stephenson and as well as Bernd Langensiepen and Ahmet Güleryüz, who agree that it took place at Igoumenitsa. That Beehler makes no mention of Antalya in the engagement of 30 September 1911 suggests he is incorrect.) where Alpagot and Hamidiye were anchored in the harbor. Alpino, Artigliere, and Corazziere penetrated the harbor at Igoumenitsa on the morning of 30 September, where Artigliere and Corazziere sank Alpagot and Hamidiye with gunfire while they still were at anchor. Meanwhile, Alpino came alongside the armed yacht "Trablus," whose boilers were under repair. The yacht's crew opened her seacocks in an attempt to scuttle her and abandoned ship. Alpino sent a boarding party aboard the yacht and closed the seacocks to prevent her from sinking. The Alpino crewmen were cutting the yacht's mooring lines when civilians on shore opened fire on the boarding party, prompting Corazziere to bombard the town, silencing the civilian gunfire and damaging the fort at Igoumenitsa, which did not fire during the battle. Alpino then towed the yacht out of port.

On 5 October 1911, a motorboat from Artigliere that had been searching an Austro-Hungarian mail steamer in the harbor at Shëngjin (known to the Italians as San Giovanni de Medua) on the coast of Albania came under fire from field guns in an earthwork. Artigliere responded by bombarding the earthwork, silencing its guns and damaging a number of buildings in the city of Shëngjin. Artigliere, which suffered minor damage before silencing the earthwork, ceased fire after 45 minutes when she ran out of ammunition. Meanwhile, Carabiniere arrived on the scene and also opened fire, bombarding the earthwork for 20 minutes before departing.

In January 1912 Artigliere, her sister ship Garibaldino, and the protected cruiser Piemonte deployed to the Red Sea to search for Ottoman ships along the coast. On 7 January 1912 Artigliere came across a large group of Ottoman ships – the gunboats Ayintag (or Antep), Bafra, Gökçedağ, Kastamonu, Ordu, and Refahiye, the armed tug Muha, and the armed steam yacht Şipka (formerly Fuad, Fauwette, or Fouvette) — in the harbor at Kunfuda on the coast of the Arabian Peninsula. The Ottoman vessels moved to attack Artigliere, and Garibaldino and Piemonte rushed to her aid. The ensuing clash, the Battle of Kunfuda Bay, lasted for three hours. Opening fire at a range of 4,500 metres (4,900 yards), the Italians sank three of the gunboats and forced the other three to beach themselves to avoid sinking, their crews fleeing after reaching shore. Sources do not mention the fate of Muha. On 8 January, the Italian ships returned and put ashore landing parties which completed the destruction of the beached gunboats after salvaging guns and trophies from them. The ships then bombarded Kunfuda and captured four Arab dhows. After the Ottoman troops in the area fled, a landing party from Piemonte occupied the town. Sources are unclear as to whether Şipka sank or remained afloat during the events of 7–8 January, but agree that the Italians seized her as a prize, towed her to Massawa, and later took her to Italy, where she was incorporated into the Regia Marina as the gunboat Cunfuda.

In June 1912 Artigliere departed the Red Sea and returned to Italy. The war ended on 18 October 1912 in an Italian victory.

=== World War I ===
World War I broke out in 1914, and Italy entered the war on the side of the Allies with its declaration of war on Austria-Hungary on 23 May 1915. At the time, Artigliere, under the command of Capitano di fregata (Frigate Captain) De Grossi, was part of the 3rd Destroyer Squadron, based at Brindisi, which also included Bersagliere, Corazziere, Garibaldino, and their sister ship Lanciere. On 29 May 1915 Artigliere, Bersagliere, Garibaldino, and Lanciere bombarded the Adria Werke chemical plant in Monfalcone, a production site for poison gases, while Alpino, Corazziere, and their sister ship Pontiere provided support. The ships carried out another bombardment of the Adria Werke on 7 June 1915.

Artigliere continued her World War I service without participating in any other significant events. By late October 1918, Austria-Hungary had effectively disintegrated, and the Armistice of Villa Giusti, signed on 3 November 1918, went into effect on 4 November 1918 and brought hostilities between Austria-Hungary and the Allies to an end. World War I ended a week later with an armistice between the Allies and the German Empire on 11 November 1918.

=== Post-World War I ===
Artigliere was reclassified as a torpedo boat on 1 July 1921. She was stricken from the naval register on 14 June 1923 and subsequently scrapped.
