= Ie =

Ie, ie, IE or I/E may refer to:

== Arts and entertainment ==
- Iced Earth, a band from Florida, US
- Improv Everywhere, a comedy group
- Into Eternity (band), a band from Canada
- Individual events (speech), events centred around public speaking
- IE, a 2015 studio album by the Norwegian guitarist and composer Eivind Aarset

== Businesses and organizations ==
- Iarnród Éireann, or Irish Rail
- Identity Evropa, a white supremacist group in the United States
- Ie (trading houses), a Japanese cottage industry
- IE Business School, formerly Instituto de Empresa, a business school in Spain
- Immigration Enforcement, a UK law enforcement command
- Institut Eksekutif, an educational institution in Malaysia
- Institute for Energy, of the European Union
- Instituto Escuela (disambiguation), various entities
- Solomon Airlines (IATA airline designator)

== Language ==
- id est (i.e.), Latin for "that is" or "in other words"
- ie (digraph)
- Ie (letter), a Georgian letter
- Indian English, the form of English spoken in the Republic of India
- International English, a global English language
- -ie, an English diminutive suffix
- Ye (Cyrillic), also spelled Ie, a Cyrillic letter that looks exactly like the Latin E
- Ukrainian Ye, also spelled Ie, the Cyrillic letter Є
- Interlingue, originally the Occidental language (ISO 639-1 code IE)
- Indo-European language family

== Places ==
- Republic of Ireland, by ISO 3166-1 alpha-2 code
- Inland Empire, California, US
- Ie, Okinawa, Japan
- Old Irish name for the Scottish island of Iona (or Ì Chaluim Chille)
- Ie, Noardeast-Fryslân, Netherlands

== Science and technology ==
=== Computing ===
- Internet Explorer, a web browser by Microsoft
- .ie, Internet top-level domain for Ireland
- Industrial Ethernet, a version of Ethernet
- Infinity Engine, a video game engine
- Information extraction, a type of information retrieval
- IntelliMouse Explorer, a brand of mouse by Microsoft

=== Other uses in science and technology ===
- Inclusion/exclusion criteria, in clinical trials
- Industrial ecology, the study of sustainable industrial systems
- Industrial engineering, an engineering discipline
- Information engineering, an engineering discipline
- Infective endocarditis, a form of endocarditis caused by infectious agents
- Information Element, a basic building block of wireless messages in a cellular network
- Ionization energy, the energy required to strip an atom or molecule of an electron

== Other uses ==
- Ie, the classical Japanese family system
- Ie, a shirt in traditional Romanian dress

== See also ==
- "i before e except after c", a spelling guideline of the English language
- Indo-European (disambiguation), as in:
  - Indo-European languages
  - Proto-Indo-Europeans, Indo-European people
  - Indo-European studies
- Ee, Dongeradeel, (West Frisian Ie), a Dutch village
