= Ottoman torpedo boat Akhisar =

Ottoman torpedo boat

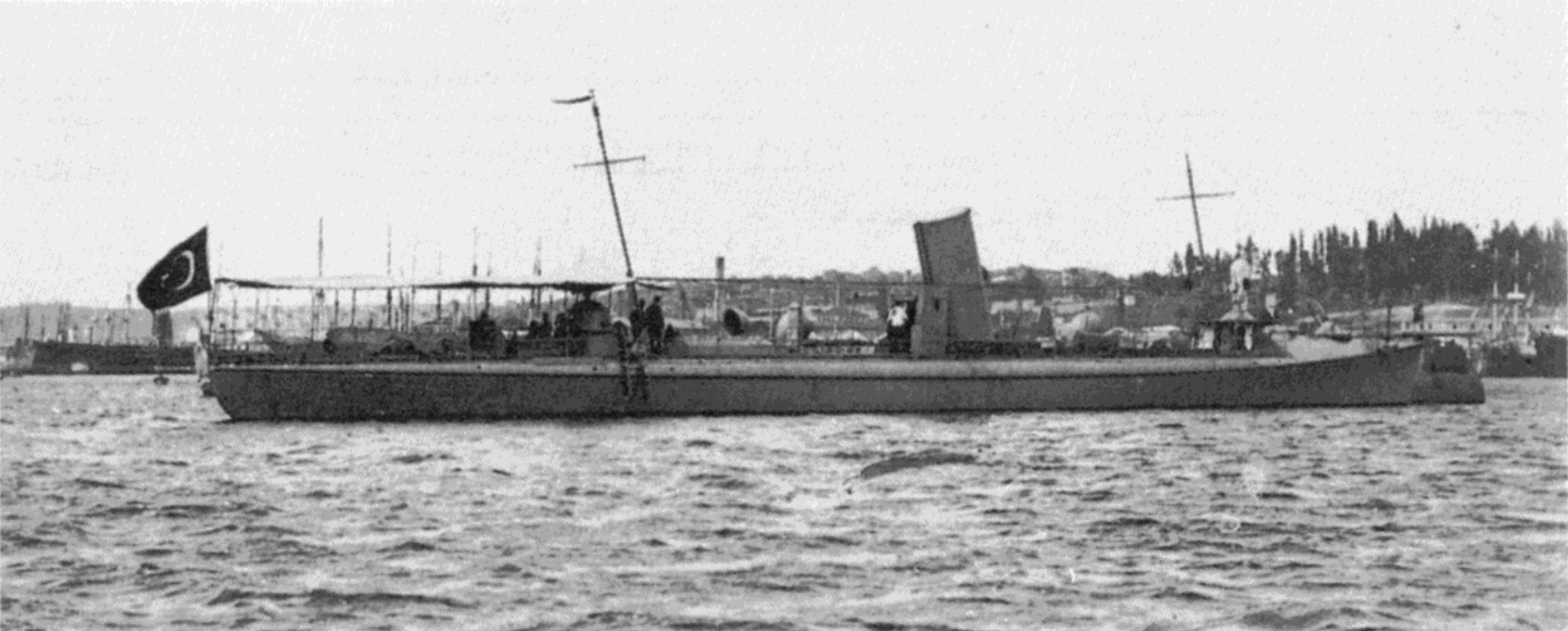
- Akhisar in Istanbul, 1906

History

Ottoman Empire
- Name: Akhisar
- Namesake: Akhisar
- Ordered: December 1902
- Builder: Ansaldo, Armstrong & Cie, Genoa
- Laid down: 1904
- Launched: 25 April 1904
- Commissioned: June 1904
- Stricken: 1930
- Fate: Scrapped, 1935

General characteristics as built
- Class & type: Akhisar-class torpedo boat
- Displacement: 165 t (162 long tons)
- Length: 50.5 m (165 ft 8 in) (p/p)
- Beam: 5.7 m (18 ft 8 in)
- Draft: 1.4 m (4 ft 7 in)
- Installed power: 2 × Ansaldo boilers; 2,400 hp (1,800 kW)
- Propulsion: 2 × Shafts; 2 × steam engines
- Speed: 24 knots (44 km/h; 28 mph)
- Complement: 4 officers, 26 enlisted men
- Armament: 2 × 37 mm (1.5 in) Hotchkiss guns; 2 × 450 mm (18 in) torpedo tubes

Akhisar was a torpedo boat built in Italy during the early 20th century, the lead ship of her class. The ship was launched on 25 April 1904 at the Ansaldo shipyard in Genoa, and became part of the Ottoman Navy in June 1904. The torpedo boat took part in the First Balkan War and World War I, and after an overhaul in the 1920s served under the flag of the Republic of Turkey until 1930. The ship was scrapped in 1935.

== Technical data ==
The Akhisar-class torpedo boats had a hull made of steel, divided into nine watertight compartments. Their overall length was 51 m (167 ft 4 in) (50.5 m (165 ft 8 in) between perpendiculars), their width was 5.7 m (18 ft 8 in) and their draft was 1.4 m (4 ft 7 in). They weighed 165 t (162 long tons). The boats were powered by two vertical three-cylinder Ansaldo triple-expansion steam engines with a total power of 2,400 hp (1,800 kW), to which steam was supplied by two locomotive boilers (also made by Ansaldo). The maximum speed of the boats, which were propelled by two screws, was 24 knots The ships carried a reserve of 60 tons of coal.

Their artillery armament consisted of two single 37 mm quick-firing Hotchkiss guns. Torpedo weapons consisted of two 450 mm deck-mounted single rotatable torpedo launchers mounted behind and in front of the bridge.

The ship's crew consisted of 4 officers and 26 non-commissioned officers and sailors. (Note: Gardiner & Gray stated that the ship's crew numbered 20 people.)

== Construction ==
The torpedo boats of the Akhisar-class were ordered by the Ottoman Empire from Italy in December 1902 and a contract was signed that month for the delivery of two vessels.

Akhisar was built at the Ansaldo shipyard in Genoa (shipyard number 131). The keel of the ship was laid in 1904, and was launched on 25 April 1904.

== Operational history ==
Akhisar was commissioned into the Ottoman Navy in June 1904 in Istanbul. During the First Balkan War on 16 December 1912, Akhisar, along with most of the Ottoman fleet, took part in the Battle of Elli.

At the outbreak of World War I, she was already obsolete and of low combat value. On August 29, 1914, the ship with a German officer, Oberleutnant zur See Frige on board left the Dardanelles and went under Imbros on a reconnaissance mission. The torpedo boat was stopped by British ships and the crew was informed that the Entente had begun a blockade of the Turkish Straits. In 1915, the ship's depleted engine room allowed it to reach a top speed of 14 knots, and the crew size was increased to 43 (4 Germans and 39 Turks). That year, one of the torpedo launchers was also dismantled, installing instead a single 47 mm caliber SK L/45 C/99 gun.

On 18 May 1915, Akhisar escorted three ferries loaded with soldiers and ammunition, which became the target of an attack by a British submarine operating in the Sea of Marmara, HMS E11. It sank the 1879-built ferry Bandırma (474 BRT) with a torpedo, on board of which, despite the rescue operation carried out by the torpedo boat, 250 people died (this was the largest loss of the Ottoman army suffered at sea during the war). On October 24, near Gallipoli, Akhisar detected a British submarine (HMS E12) returning to base, which was forced to make an emergency dive, descending to a dangerous depth of 76 meters. On December 11, she ran aground near Silivri, from where it was towed to Istanbul. On December 17, the ship skirted HMS E2, which sank two dhows and a schooner by the time the torpedo boat arrived.

On 22 January 1918, Akhisar and the destroyers Taşoz and Numûne-i Hamiyet were based in Çanakkale, ready to protect the stranded battlecruiser Yavuz Sultan Selim from attack by enemy submarines. As of July 14, the torpedo boats Akhisar, Draç, Musul and Sultanhisar along with torpedo cruisers Berk-i Satvet and Peyk-i Şevket were the only ships of the Ottoman fleet to operate actively in the Black Sea. In October, the ship was put back in reserve.

After the end of the war, from February 1919 to 1920, the unit was on patrol duty, fighting smugglers. On 19 October 1923, the Akhisar was formally incorporated into the newly formed Turkish Navy, although its technical condition did not allow for operation. Between 1924 and 1925, the vessel underwent an overhaul at Deniz Fabrikaları in Istanbul, and after its completion she entered active service. The ship was withdrawn from the fleet in 1930 and scrapped in 1935. (Note: Gardiner & Gray states that the ship was withdrawn from service in 1927.)
