= Ottoman torpedo boat Kütahya =

Ottoman torpedo boat

- Kütahya in 1913

History

Ottoman Empire
- Name: Kütahya
- Owner: Ottoman Navy
- Ordered: 1904
- Builder: Ansaldo, Armstrong & Co, Genoa
- Way number: 139
- Laid down: April 1904
- Launched: 1904
- Acquired: 29 November 1906
- Commissioned: 8 January 1907
- Fate: Sunk, 1916

General characteristics
- Type: Antalya-class torpedo boat
- Displacement: 165 long tons (168 t)
- Length: 165 ft 8 in (50.5 m) (between perpendiculars)
- Beam: 18 ft 8 in (5.7 m)
- Draft: 4 ft 7 in (1.4 m)
- Installed power: 2,400 ihp (1,800 kW)
- Propulsion: 2 × engines; 2 × boilers; 2 propellers
- Speed: 24 knots (44 km/h; 28 mph)
- Capacity: 60 long tons (61 t) of coal
- Complement: 20
- Armament: 2 × 37 mm (1.5 in) guns; 2 × 356 mm (14.0 in) torpedo tubes

Kütahya (also written as Kutahya) was an Antalya-class torpedo boat operated by the Ottoman Navy. Built as part of an effort to modernize the fleet, the vessel was launched in 1904 and commissioned in 1907. During the First Balkan War, she was used to defend the Bosporus. She was used in a similar role during World War I and was fitted with minesweeping gear in 1916 to clear naval mines. On 12 September 1916, the torpedo boat struck a mine and sank.

== Development and design ==
In the early 20th century, Sultan Abdul Hamid II began a modest modernization of the neglected Ottoman Navy following a buildup of the rival Greek Navy. Rather than construct ships for their military capabilities, his government ordered warships from foreign governments as a diplomatic measure to serve as compensation for the destruction of foreign assets during domestic unrest in the 1890s. In 1904, the Navy ordered seven torpedo boats from Italy, with a similar design to the Akhisar-class torpedo boat ordered several years prior. The orders from Ansaldo, Armstrong & Co in Genoa were the last part of compensation payments to Italy.

The seven Antalya-class torpedo boats had a length between perpendiculars of 165 feet 8 inches (50.5 m), with a beam of 18 feet 8 inches (5.7 m) and a draught of 4 feet 7 inches (1.4 m). They displaced 165 long tons (168 t) and carried a complement of 20. Propulsion was provided by two propellers powered by triple-expansion steam engines supplied by two locomotive-type boilers. The first two vessels developed 2,700 indicated horsepower (2,000 kW) and had a maximum speed of 27 knots (50 km/h; 31 mph), while the remaining seven produced 2,400 indicated horsepower (1,800 kW) and had a maximum speed of 24 knots (44 km/h; 28 mph). The boats carried 60 long tons (61 t) of coal. Armament consisted of two 37 mm (1.5 in) Hotchkiss revolving cannon and two 356 mm (14.0 in) torpedo tubes.

== Service history ==
Initially designated Yard Number 139, Kütahya was laid down in April 1904, launched that year, and preformed sea trials throughout 1905 before she was handed over to the Ottomans at Genoa on 29 November 1906 and commissioned on 8 January 1907. In May 1908, the Ottoman Navy held its first fleet maneuver, in the Sea of Marmara. While the exercise was not effective, it included a simulated attack by Kütahya and other torpedo boats on the larger ships in the fleet. By the First Balkan War, parts of the Ottoman fleet were is disrepair due to chronic maintenance issues. While Kütahya herself was not affected, the Navy made the ships look as if they were maintained and prepared and assigned them to defend the Bosporus. In October 1912, Kütahya, along with the ironclad Mesudiye and torpedo boat Hamidabad, anchored off Büyükdere near the Black Sea to serve as guardships.

By World War I, the Antalya-class torpedo boats were obsolete and worn out, but the Navy lacked replacements. At the start of the war, Kütahya and her flotilla patrolled the Bosporus. In multiple instances throughout the spring and summer, she is detected by enemy submarines, but neither side are able to hit each other. By September 1916, Russian minefields cut off supplies from reaching Istanbul, forcing food rationioning in the city. As a result, Kütahya and several other ships were fitted with minesweeping gear, but she struck a mine on 12 September east of Karaburun while minesweeping. An attempt was made to tow the ship, but her bulkheads gave out and she soon sank, killing three crewmembers.
