= Ottoman torpedo boat Ankara =

Ottoman torpedo boat

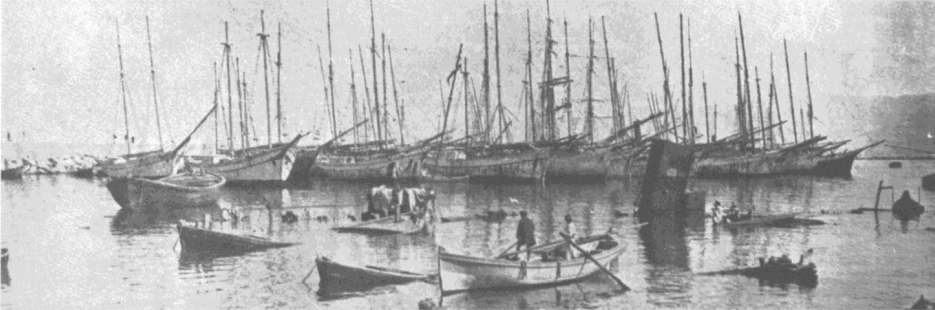
- Wreck of Ankara in Beirut harbor

History

Ottoman Empire
- Name: Ankara
- Owner: Ottoman Navy
- Builder: Ansaldo, Armstrong & Co, Genoa
- Way number: 136
- Laid down: April 1904
- Launched: 1904
- Acquired: 29 November 1906
- Commissioned: December 1906
- Fate: Scuttled, 1912

General characteristics
- Class & type: Antalya-class torpedo boat
- Displacement: 165 long tons (168 t)
- Length: 165 ft 8 in (50.5 m) (between perpendiculars)
- Beam: 18 ft 8 in (5.7 m)
- Draft: 4 ft 7 in (1.4 m)
- Installed power: 2,400 ihp (1,800 kW)
- Propulsion: 2 × engines; 2 × boilers; 2 propellers
- Speed: 24 knots (44 km/h; 28 mph)
- Capacity: 60 long tons (61 t) of coal
- Complement: 20
- Armament: 2 × 37 mm (1.5 in) guns; 2 × 356 mm (14.0 in) torpedo tubes

Ankara was a Antalya-class torpedo boat operated by the Ottoman Navy between 1906 and 1912. She was built in Italy during a larger modernization of the fleet, and operated for six years. During the Italo-Turkish War, she was scuttled after two Italian cruisers attacked Beirut on 24 January 1912.

== Development and design ==
In the early 20th century, Sultan Abdul Hamid II began a modest modernization of the neglected Ottoman Navy following a buildup of the rival Greek Navy. Rather than construct ships for their military capabilities, his government ordered warships from foreign governments as a diplomatic measure to serve as compensation for the destruction of foreign assets during domestic unrest in the 1890s. In 1904, the Navy ordered seven torpedo boats from Italy, with a similar design to the Akhisar-class torpedo boat ordered several years prior. The orders from Ansaldo, Armstrong & Co in Genoa were the last part of compensation payments to Italy.

The seven Antalya-class torpedo boats had a length between perpendiculars of 165 feet 8 inches (50.5 m), with a beam of 18 feet 8 inches (5.7 m) and a draught of 4 feet 7 inches (1.4 m). They displaced 165 long tons (168 t) and carried a complement of 20. Propulsion was provided by two propellers powered by triple-expansion steam engines supplied by two locomotive-type boilers. The first two vessels developed 2,700 indicated horsepower (2,000 kW) and had a maximum speed of 27 knots (50 km/h; 31 mph), while the remaining seven produced 2,400 indicated horsepower (1,800 kW) and had a maximum speed of 24 knots (44 km/h; 28 mph). The boats carried 60 long tons (61 t) of coal. Armament consisted of two 37 mm (1.5 in) Hotchkiss revolving cannon and two 356 mm (14.0 in) torpedo tubes.

== Service history ==
Initially designated Yard Number 136, Ankara was laid down in April 1904, launched that year and preformed sea trials throughout 1905 before she was handed over to the Ottomans at Genoa on 29 November 1906. She was commissioned in December at Istanbul During the Italo-Turkish War, Italian heavy cruisers Gisuseppe Garibaldi and Francesco Ferruccio bombarded Beirut on 24 January 1912. At 11 am, Gisuseppe Garibaldi entered the port and torpedoed the Ottoman ironclad Avnillah. Ankara was the only other Ottoman warship in the port; her captain believed resistance would be futile, and ordered the torpedo boat to be scuttled.
