= IEE =

IEE may stand for:

- Industrial Electronic Engineers, an aerospace display manufacturer
- Initial Environmental Evaluation, a preliminary environmental impact assessment
- Institute for Energy Efficiency, a research institute at the University of California, Santa Barbara
- Institute for Energy & Environment, at New Mexico State University
- Institution of Electrical Engineers, a British professional organisation now part of the Institution of Engineering and Technology
- Instituto de Estudos Empresariais, a Brazilian non-profit
- Intuitive Ethical Extrovert, in socionics
- Intelligent Energy Europe, CIP Operational programme

== See also ==
- Institute of Electrical and Electronics Engineers (IEEE)
- IIE (disambiguation)
- IE (disambiguation)
