= IIE =

IIE may stand for:

- The Independent Institute of Education, South Africa
- Innovative Interstellar Explorer, a proposed mission to send a probe to the heliopause
- Institut d'Informatique d'Entreprise, French public Grandes écoles specializing in computer science
- Institute for International Economics, economics think tank based in Washington, D.C.
- Institute of Industrial Engineers, world's largest professional society for industrial engineering professionals
- Institute of International Education, a world leader in the international exchange of people and ideas
- Institution of Incorporated Engineers, once the UK's largest multidisciplinary engineering association, now part of IET
- Instituto de Investigaciones Estéticas, art history research institute at Mexico's National Autonomous University (UNAM)
- Indian Institute of Entrepreneurship, an autonomous entrepreneurship development institute located in Guwahati, Assam, India.
- The Apple IIe, the third model in Apple's line of Apple II computers

== See also ==
- 2E (disambiguation), including a list of topics named II-E, etc.
- IEE (disambiguation)
- IE (disambiguation)
