= E2 =

E2, e2, E02, E.II, e^{2} or E-2 may refer to:

== Science and technology ==
- E2 reaction, a type of elimination reaction
- Honda E2, one of the predecessors of Honda's ASIMO robot
- E2, a communications channel defined in the E-carrier standard
- G_{2} (mathematics) (old name E2 or E_{2}), a group
- E-2 process, an obsolete film developing method for photographic transparency film

=== Biology and medicine ===
- Ubiquitin-conjugating enzyme, a protein component of proteasome-mediated protein degradation
- E2 regulatory sequence, for the insulin gene
- Levuglandin E2, an aldehyde
- Prostaglandin E2, an abortifacient
- Prostaglandin E2 receptor, a human gene
- Iodine-deficiency (ICD-10 code: E02)
- Estradiol, an estrogen steroid hormone
- Dihydrolipoyl transacetylase, the second element of the multienzyme pyruvate dehydrogenase complex
- Acireductone dioxygenase (iron(II)-requiring), an enzyme
- Haplogroup E2 (Y-DNA), a human Y-chromosome DNA haplogroup

=== Computing ===
- E2 (cipher), a block cipher submitted to the AES competition by NTT
- Tungsten E2, a business-class Palm OS-based handheld computer
- Motorola ROKR E2, a smartphone
- Everything2, a collaborative web-based community consisting of a database of interlinked user-submitted written material

== Arts and entertainment ==
- E^{2} (album), a 2007 album by Eros Ramazzotti

=== Television ===
- "E²", an episode of Star Trek: Enterprise
- MTV e2, a Canadian entertainment news program that airs on MTV Canada
- E2 (TV channel), a Turkish TV channel
- e2 by SKY PerfecTV!, a satellite television service in Japan operated by SKY Perfect

== Transport ==
=== Air ===
- Northrop Grumman E-2 Hawkeye, an American carrier-based AWACS aircraft
- Fokker E.II, a 1915 German single-seat monoplane fighter aircraft
- Pfalz E.II, a German aircraft powered by the Oberursel U.I engine
- Taylor E-2, a small, light and simple utility aircraft
- Embraer E-Jet E2 family, an updated version of the E-jet family
- Eastman E-2 Sea Rover, a 1920s seaplane
- Eurowings Europe (former IATA code: E2), an Austrian airline subsidiary of Lufthansa
- Kampuchea Airlines (former IATA code: E2), a Cambodian airline

=== Rail ===
- E2 Series Shinkansen, a Japanese high-speed train
- EMC E2, an early American passenger-train diesel locomotive
- LB&SCR E2 class, a class of 0-6-0T steam locomotives designed by Lawson Billington
- PRR E2, an American PRR 4-4-2 locomotive
- CNW Class E-2, a class of 4-6-2 steam locomotives built by the American Locomotive Company in 1923

=== Roads and footpaths ===
- E02 expressway (Sri Lanka), in Sri Lanka
- E2 European long distance path, a long-distance footpath that runs from Galway in Ireland to France's Mediterranean coast
- North–South Expressway Southern Route (E2), in Malaysia
- European route E002, in Azerbaijan and Armenia
- E2 expressway (Philippines), expressway route in the Philippines
- San'yō Expressway, Hiroshiwa-Iwakuni Road, Ogori Road and Yamaguchi-Ube Road, numbered as E2 in Japan

=== Submarines ===
- HMS E2, an E-class submarine of the Royal Navy
- USS E-2, an E-class submarine of the US Navy

=== Other transport ===
- London Buses route E2, England

== Other uses ==
- E-2 visa, a type of US visa
- E2, a postcode district in the E postcode area for east London, England
- Private E-2, a pay grade for the rank of Private in the US Army
- E2 (nightclub), a nightclub in Chicago, US
- Eternity II puzzle, a puzzle competition
- E-II Holdings, Inc., an investment holding company formerly owned by Meshulam Riklis, and later by Carl Icahn
- E2 grade, an assessment of difficulty in rock climbing

== See also ==
- E2c, earphones by Shure
- 2E (disambiguation)
- EII (disambiguation)
