= Antalya-class torpedo boat =

Ottoman torpedo boat class

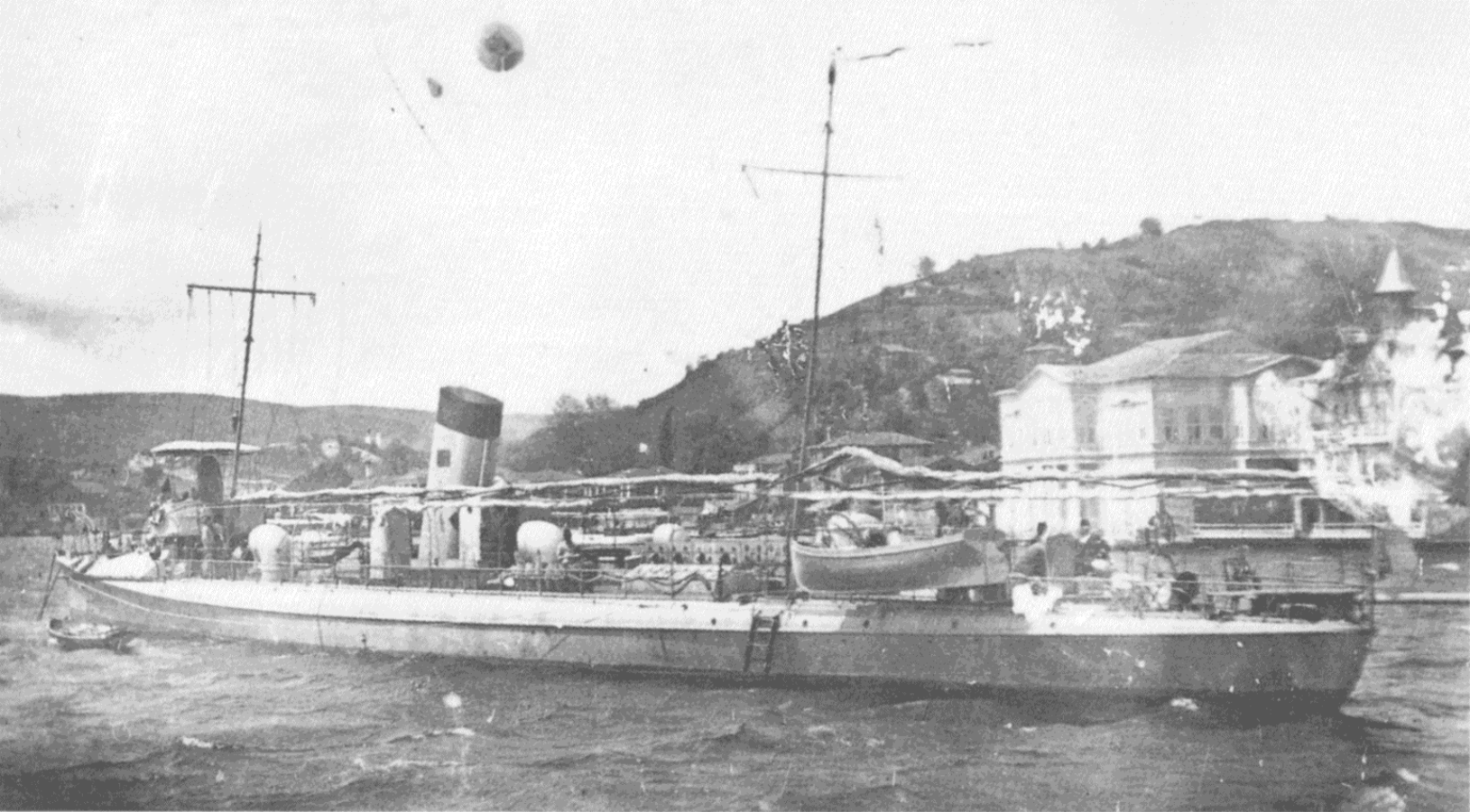
- Stern view of Draç in 1910

Class overview
- Name: Antalya class
- Builders: Ansaldo, Armstrong & Co, Genoa
- Operators: Ottoman Navy; Turkish Navy; Hellenic Navy
- Built: 1904
- In service: 1907–1918; 1924–1929
- Completed: 7
- Lost: 3
- Scrapped: 4

General characteristics
- Type: Torpedo boat
- Displacement: 165 long tons (168 t)
- Length: 165 ft 8 in (50.5 m) (between perpendiculars)
- Beam: 18 ft 8 in (5.7 m)
- Draft: 4 ft 7 in (1.4 m)
- Installed power: 2,400 ihp (1,800 kW)
- Propulsion: 2 × engines; 2 × boilers; 2 propellers
- Speed: 24 knots (44 km/h; 28 mph)
- Capacity: 60 long tons (61 t) of coal
- Complement: 20
- Armament: 2 × 37 mm (1.5 in) guns; 2 × 356 mm (14.0 in) torpedo tubes

The Antalya-class torpedo boat was a series of seven torpedo boats operated by the Ottoman Navy. Ordered to modernize the Ottoman fleet, they were built in Italy in 1904 with a similar design to Italian torpedo boats and nearly identical to the Ottoman Akhisar-class torpedo boats built at the same shipyard. One ship in the class sank in a storm and one was sunk during the Italo-Turkish War.

During the war, two were scuttled, then salvaged and operated by the Hellenic Navy until 1916. During World War I, the torpedo boats were outdated but served in a variety of roles. One torpedo boat struck a mine and sank. The two Ottoman ships were interned in accordance with the Armistice of Mudros, and later recommissioned into the subsequent Turkish Navy.

== Development and design ==
In the early 20th century, Sultan Abdul Hamid II began a modest modernization of the neglected Ottoman Navy following a buildup of the rival Greek Navy. Rather than construct ships for their military capabilities, his government ordered warships from foreign governments as a diplomatic measure to serve as compensation for the destruction of foreign assets during domestic unrest in the 1890s. In 1902, the Navy ordered two torpedo boats from Italy, known as the Akhisar-class torpedo boat. They were followed by a further seven in 1904, known as the Antalya class. Both classes featured a very similar design based on the Italian torpedo boat Condore and are occasionally referred to as one class of nine vessels. The orders from Ansaldo, Armstrong & Co in Genoa were the last part of compensation payments to Italy.

The seven Antalya-class torpedo boats had a length between perpendiculars of 165 feet 8 inches (50.5 m), with a beam of 18 feet 8 inches (5.7 m) and a draught of 4 feet 7 inches (1.4 m). They displaced 165 long tons (168 t) and carried a complement of 20. Propulsion was provided by two propellers powered by triple-expansion steam engines supplied by two locomotive-type boilers. The first two vessels developed 2,700 indicated horsepower (2,000 kW) and had a maximum speed of 27 knots (50 km/h; 31 mph), while the remaining seven produced 2,400 indicated horsepower (1,800 kW) and had a maximum speed of 24 knots (44 km/h; 28 mph). The boats carried 60 long tons (61 t) of coal. Armament consisted of two 37 mm (1.5 in) Hotchkiss revolving cannon and two 356 mm (14.0 in) torpedo tubes.

== Service history ==
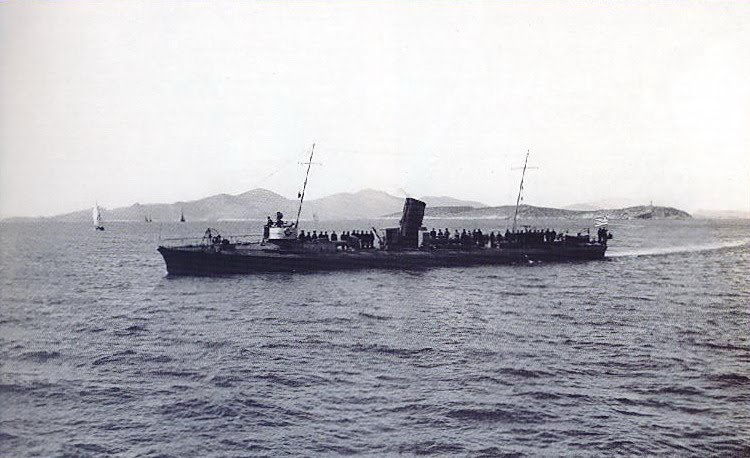
The former Antalya in Greek service as Nikopolis

Ordered in 1904, all seven of the ships were laid down and launched in 1904. After sea trials, four were commissioned at Istanbul in December 1906 while the last three were commissioned in January 1907. Urfa sank in a storm off Selanik in 1908, and during the Italo-Turkish War, Ankara was scuttled during the Battle of Beirut. After Preveza was captured by Greece, the local Ottoman commander scuttled Antalya and Tokad. The two ships were salvaged and commissioned into the Greek Navy as Nikopolis and Totoi, respectfully. They both were decommissioned in 1916. The torpedo boats were obsolete and worn out by World War I, but the Navy lacked replacements. The ships were used to escort convoys, hunt submarines, and in 1916, were equipped with German minesweeping gear to clear a path through the Bosphorus. Due to chronic coal shortages, the ships spent parts of the war laid up at İstinye along with other elements of the Ottoman fleet. In September 1916, Kütahya struck a mine and sank.

Musul and Draç were the only members of the class to survive World War I. The two were decommissioned in 1918 and interned in the Gulf of İzmit with other former Ottoman ships in accordance with the Armistice of Mudros. Following the Turkish War of Independence, Turkey was permitted to operate several of the former Ottoman ships in the Treaty of Sèvres, and the torpedo boats were recommissioned into the Turkish Navy in 1924. The Treaty limited the Navy to only six torpedo boats, each armed with only a single 77 mm (3.0 in) gun and no torpedoes. Draç was recommissioned briefly that year before she was hulked and scrapped in 1936, while Musul was recommissioned in 1924, decommissioned again in 1929, and dismantled in 1936.

== Ships in class ==
Data
Name	Ordered	Laid down	Launch	Commissioned	Fate
Antalya	1904	April 1904	1904	December 1906	Captured by Greece and renamed Nikopolis, decommissioned in 1916
Urfa	1904	April 1904	1904	December 1906	Foundered 11 December 1908
Ankara	1904	April 1904	1904	December 1906	Sunk 24 February 1912
Tokad	1904	April 1904	1904	December 1906	Captured by Greece and renamed Totoi, decommissioned in 1916
Draç	1904	April 1904	1904	8 January 1907	Hulked in 1926, broken up in 1936
Kütahya	1904	April 1904	1904	8 January 1907	Struck a mine 14 September 1916
Musul	1904	April 1904	1904	8 January 1907	Decommissioned in 1929, broken up in 1936
