= 2E =

2E or II-E may refer to:

- 2nd meridian east, a longitude coordinate
- Apple IIe, a 1983 model in the Apple II series of personal computers
- Aptera 2e, the 2009 and first model in the Aptera 2 Series by Aptera Motors
- Oflag II-E, a prisoner of war camp in Germany
- 2nd arrondissement of Paris
- Transcription Factor II E
- Twice exceptional, an individual with special needs who is also gifted.
- A reference to data collected by the Einstein Observatory (version 2)
- YoRHa No. 2 Type E, the actual designation of YoRHa No. 2 Type B in Nier: Automata
- Advanced Dungeons & Dragons 2nd Edition, a version of the Dungeons & Dragons role-playing game that debuted in 1989.
- Pathfinder Second Edition, a version of the Pathfinder role playing game that debuted in 2019.

== See also ==
- E2 (disambiguation)
- IIE (disambiguation)
