= EII =

EII may refer to:

== People ==
- Edward II (1284–1327)
- Elizabeth II (1926–2022), Queen of the United Kingdom and the other Commonwealth realms

== Other uses ==
- Edward II (band), English fusion band
- Egegik Airport (FAA LID: EII), in Alaska, US
- Enterprise information integration
- Ethical Intuitive Introvert, a sociotype

== See also ==
- European Intervention Initiative (EI2), a joint military project
- E2 (disambiguation), including a list of topics named E.II
