= Battle of Preveza (1911) =

Part of the Italo-Turkish War

Coordinates: 38.9500°N 20.7333°E

- Part of the Italo-Turkish War
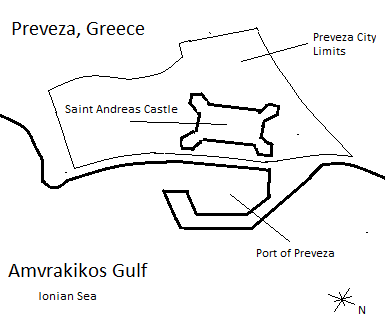
Date	29–30 September 1911
Location	Off Preveza and at Gomenítza, Ionian Sea
Result	Italian victory: Diplomatic dispute with Austria-Hungary

Belligerents
Kingdom of Italy	Ottoman Empire

Commanders and leaders
Guido Biscaretti di Ruffia	Captain Tevfik

Strength
5 destroyers	4 torpedo boats 1 armed yacht

Casualties and losses
None	~10 killed 3 torpedo boats sunk 1 armed yacht captured

This engagement should not be confused with the Battle of Preveza in 1538.

The Battle of Preveza was the first naval engagement fought during the Italo-Turkish War, which took place in the Ionian Sea on 29–30 September 1911. The action took part in two separate engagements, the first off Preveza, and the second at Gomenítza the following day. Five Italian destroyers encountered a pair of Ottoman torpedo boats off the port of Preveza on 29 September and forced one aground; the second fled into the safety of Preveza. The next day, the Italian destroyers raided Gomenítza, where another two torpedo boats and an armed yacht were at anchor. The Italians sank both torpedo boats and seized the yacht as a prize.

The Italian attacks raised considerable tensions with other European states, particularly the Austro-Hungarian Empire, which saw Italy's actions as destabilizing to the Balkans. Concerned that further operations in the region might start a broader war, the Austro-Hungarians pressured Italy to limit their attacks on Ottoman forces to Ottoman Tripolitania. A further incident on 5 October that involved an Austro-Hungarian vessel resulted in stronger Austro-Hungarian protests and a formal apology from Italy. The dispute was one of many that Italy later cited when it decided to declare war on Austria-Hungary in 1915 during World War I.

== Background ==
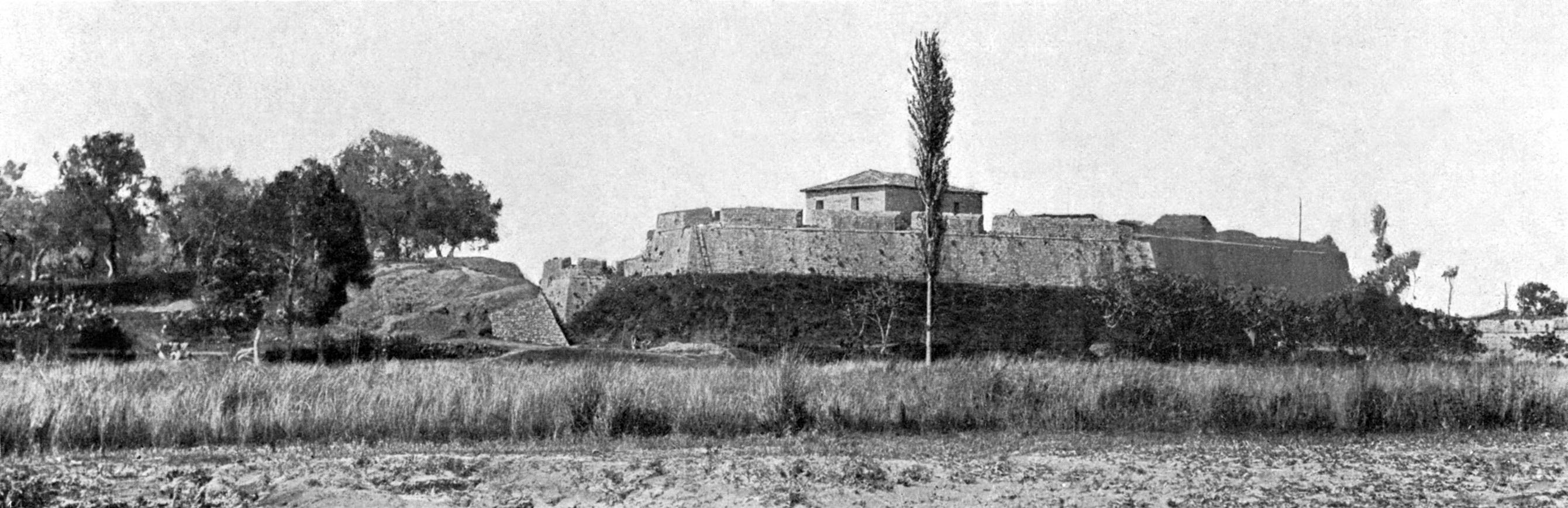
St. George's Castle photographed in 1911

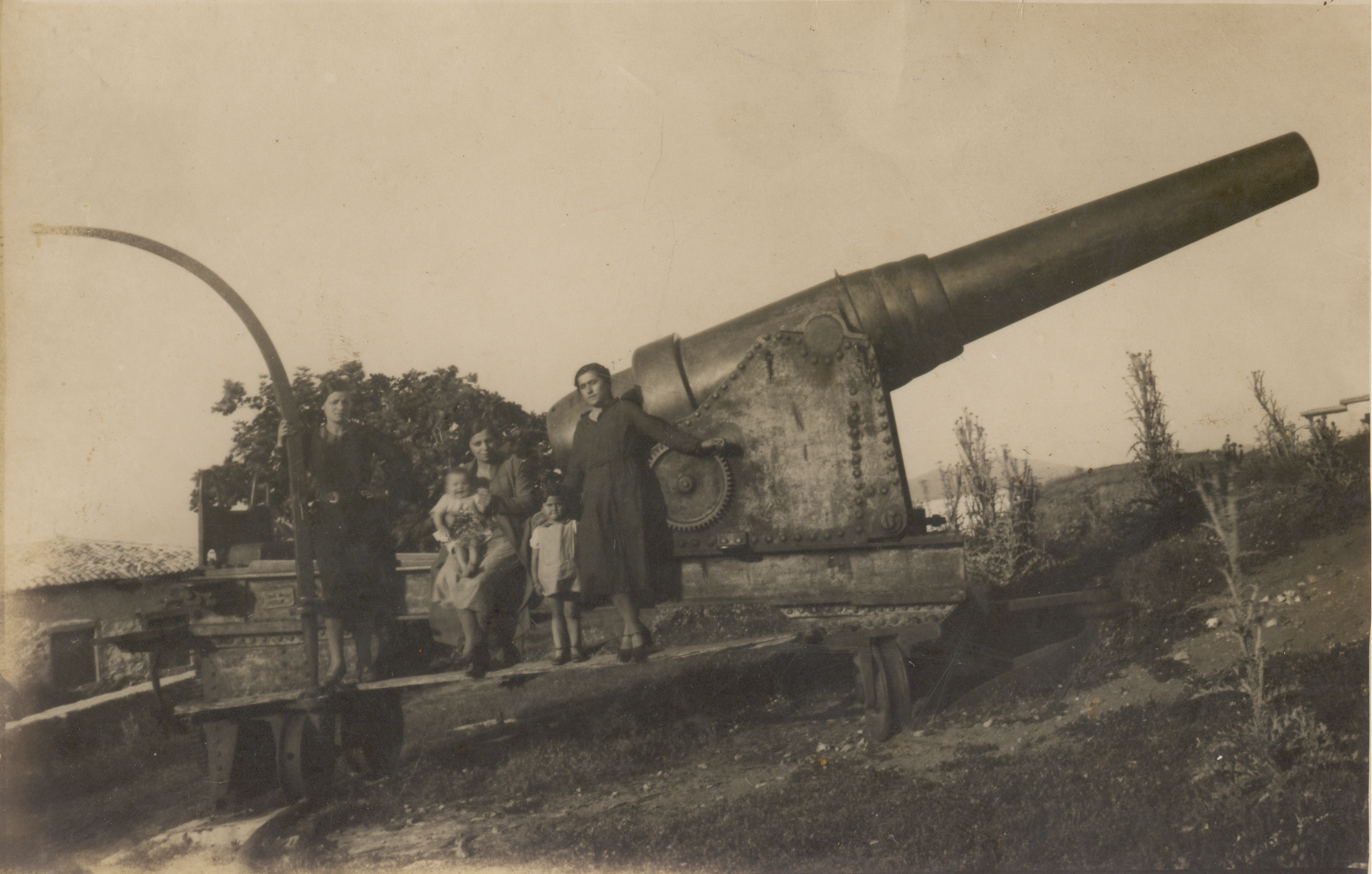
Ottoman 210 mm coastal defense gun at Paleosaraga in Preveza, Greece.

In 1911, the Ottoman Navy maintained a small anti-smuggling force of six torpedo boats dispersed along the Albanian coast, patrolling between Preveza, Gomenítza, and Durazzo. At that time, the Preveza detachment consisted of the torpedo boats Tokad, Antalya, Hamidiye, and Alpagot, the armed yacht Trablus, and the small gunboats No. 9 and No. 10. The unit was commanded by Binbasi (Captain) Tevfik. At Preveza, the Ottomans relied upon a series of obsolete fortifications for local defense, including some that had been erected in the 1400s. The defensive works were armed with a total of five 150 mm (5.9 in) Krupp guns and twenty field guns. The primary fortress was the Castle of Saint Andrew, built in the early 1800s, but reequipped with some modern artillery. It was supported by St George's castle and Fort Pantokrator, of a similar age, and a modern coastal artillery battery of two 210 mm (8.3 in) guns.

Over the course of the year, tensions between the Ottoman Empire and Italy rose as the latter sought a pretext under which it could participate in the colonization of North Africa, following French moves into Algeria and Morocco. On 27 September, Italy issued an ultimatum to cede control of Tripolitania, which the Ottoman government rejected the following day. The imminent state of war prompted the Ottoman naval command to order the torpedo boats in Albania to seek refuge in neutral Austro-Hungarian ports further north in the Adriatic Sea, but the orders did not reach the torpedo boat crews in time. The Italian Prince Luigi Amedeo planned to carry out a raid with a small force of destroyers to sink the torpedo boats in the first hours of the conflict. Amedeo was at that time the commander of the Division of the Torpedo Boat Inspector, holding the rank of rear admiral.

== Battle ==
=== At Preveza ===
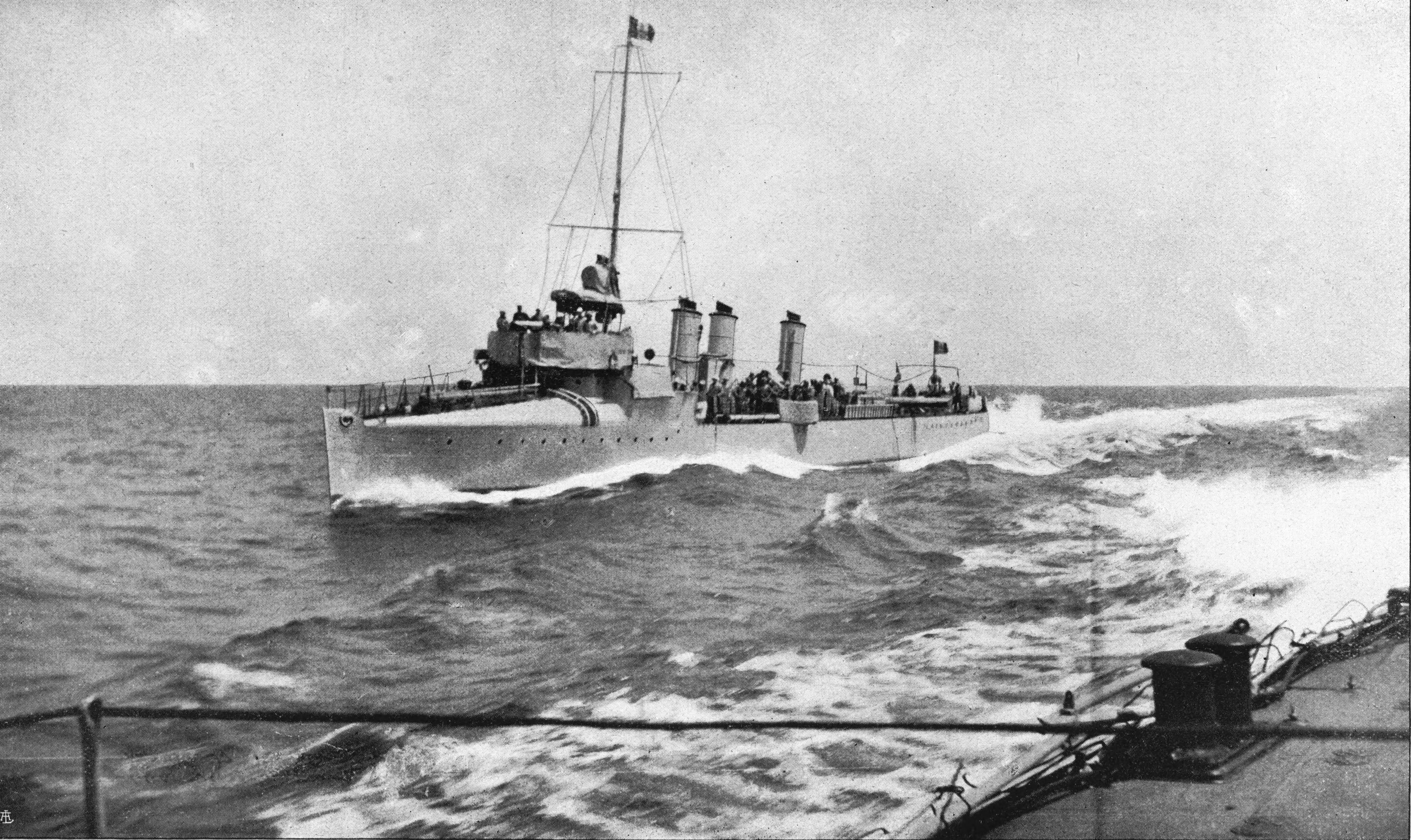
Zeffiro underway

Italy formally declared war at 15:00 on the afternoon of 29 September, and Amedeo immediately sent the five destroyers to sweep the Albanian coast; the force consisted of Artigliere, Corazziere, Fuciliere, Zeffiro, and Alpino, and was commanded by Commander Guido Biscaretti di Ruffia. About an hour after the declaration, the Italians spotted a pair of Ottoman torpedo boats—Tokad and Antalya. The Ottoman vessels had been steaming northwest between Preveza and the island of Corfu, and were en route to Singin.

The Italians opened fire and the badly outnumbered Ottomans split up, Tokad heading north and Antalya fleeing south back to Preveza. Three of the Italian destroyers chased Tokad, forcing her ashore near Nicopolis with heavy damage from their 75 mm (3 in) guns, having scored fifteen hits. Nine men were killed aboard Tokad, including her captain. Antalya, meanwhile, successfully evaded her pursuers and reached the safety of Preveza. The Ottoman 210 mm guns opened fire to cover Antalya's withdrawal, firing some 76 shells, though without scoring a hit on the Italian vessels. In the course of the action, the Italians had fired some one hundred 75 mm shells, but inflicted only light damage on Antalya.

Amedeo thereafter issued an ultimatum to the Ottoman commander of the city defenses on 3 October, demanding he surrender Antalya and other Ottoman vessels in the harbor within twenty-four hours or he would return and bombard the city. Amedeo was at that time sailing aboard the armored cruiser Vettor Pisani and was accompanied by pre-dreadnought battleship Ammiraglio di Saint Bon. By that time, however, foreign protests against Italy's actions in the Balkans had forced the Italian government to forbid further operations, and Amedeo was recalled.

=== At Gomenítza ===
Unwilling to attempt to break into the defended harbor to sink Antalya, the Italians departed for Gomenítza, where they knew other Ottoman vessels to be. That evening, an Italian officer from Corazziere went ashore to conduct a reconnaissance on the port. He observed the location of Alpagot and Hamidiye, returned to his ship, and reported the information to Biscaretti di Ruffia. Early on 30 September, Artigliere, Corazziere, and Alpino entered Gomenítza; the first two vessels opened fire on the anchored Ottoman torpedo boats. The Ottomans were unable to return fire before they were sunk. Ottoman troops in the coastal fortification protecting the port were completely surprised by the attack and offered no help, though the Italians fired seventy-six rounds into the structure and heavily damaged its sea wall.

In the meantime, Alpino had come alongside Trablus, which had been undergoing repairs to her boilers, and whose crew had attempted to scuttle her. The Italians boarded her, closed the seacocks, and cut her from her moorings. While they were working aboard the ship, Ottoman civilians in the town opened fire on the boarding party, prompting Corazziere to shell the town, which drove off the shooters. The Italians then attached a tow line to one of the destroyers to seize Trablus as a prize. According to the contemporary author William Beehler, Corazziere towed Trablus, while the historian Charles Stephenson indicates Alpino carried out the task. (Note: Beehler also states that the incident took place at Prevesa, not Gomenítza, which is contradicted both by Stephenson and the historians Bernd Langensiepen and Ahmet Güleryüz, who agree that it took place at the latter. That Beehler makes no mention of Antalya in this second engagement suggests he is incorrect.) The engagement lasted about forty-five minutes.

== Aftermath ==
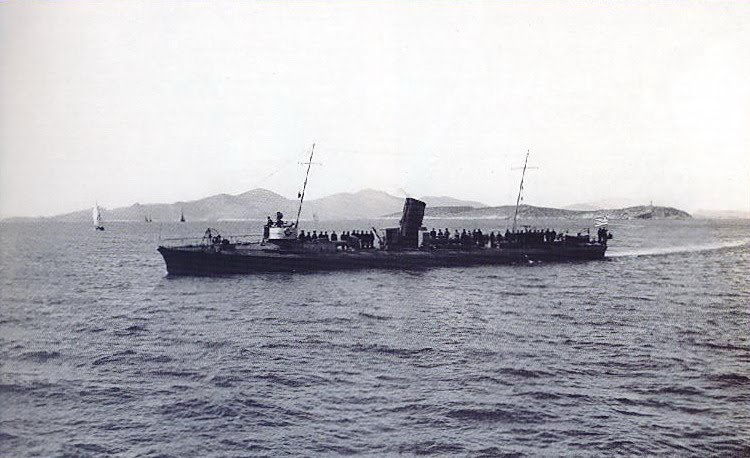
Antalya during her Greek service as Nikopolis

Italian actions prompted rumors of a planned landing in Ottoman Rumelia, which threatened to destabilize the Balkans. Alois Lexa von Aehrenthal, the Austro-Hungarian foreign minister, summoned the Italian ambassador to Austria-Hungary to object to the operations in the Adriatic. Aehrenthal characterized them as a "flagrant breach of [the Italian] promises to localize the war in the Mediterranean", and threatened "serious consequences" for failing to adhere to their assurances to avoid conflict in the Balkans. (Note: Quoted in Stephenson.) Aehrenthal believed that Italy carried out the raid to further destabilize Ottoman Albania, which had been in revolt for over a year, in an attempt to gain influence there.

Giovanni Giolitti, then the Prime Minister of Italy, ordered Amedeo to abandon further operations in the Adriatic, as he believed further provocations might lead to an Austro-Hungarian occupation of Durazzo. Additionally, the Italian government decided that halting action in the region was necessary to avoid widening the war beyond the periphery of the Ottoman Empire, despite pressure from several of the Balkan states who wished to enter the war against the Ottomans. The Italian government feared this could create a general European crisis between the great powers, which they sought to avoid. The Balkan League, consisting of Greece, Serbia, Montenegro, and Bulgaria, nevertheless declared war on the Ottoman Empire on 18 October 1912, the day the Treaty of Ouchy ended the Italo-Turkish War; this began the First Balkan War.

Despite the prohibition on further attacks in the Adriatic, on 5 October 1911, Artigliere, Corraziere, and the armored cruiser Marco Polo inspected Singin, where they found an Austro-Hungarian flagged vessel. A boarding party from Artigliere was sent to inspect the vessel, but the boat carrying the men came under fire from an Ottoman artillery battery. Artigliere then engaged in an artillery duel with the fortification, and after forty-five minutes of firing, silenced the Ottoman guns. In the course of the action, Artigliere expended most of her ammunition, and the Ottoman gunners had inflicted slight damage. Shell splinters also wounded Biscaretti. The incident prompted further protests from Austria-Hungary and Italy formally apologized on 7 October. The Austro-Hungarian Navy sent a division of battleships from Pola south to Cattaro Bay to place additional pressure on Italy. Austro-Hungarian interference chafed many in the Italian government and military, and it was included in the list of justifications for Antonio Salandra's declaration of war on Austria-Hungary in 1915 during World War I.

The Ottomans, for their part, were unconvinced by Italian assurances the war would be localized to East and North Africa, and set about reinforcing the defenses of its European and Anatolian cities, particularly Selanik and İzmir. Minefields were laid and several old vessels were scuttled in harbor entrances as block ships to prevent Italian vessels from raiding the ports.

Tokad was later salvaged by the Greek Navy after the First Balkan War brought Preveza under Greek control; she were repaired and commissioned as Totoi. Antalya, which remained at Prevesa, was also seized and commissioned as Nikopolis. Trablus was later commissioned into the Italian fleet as Capitano Verri, serving in that capacity through 1926.
