= Ottoman torpedo boat Antalya =

Ottoman and Greek torpedo boat

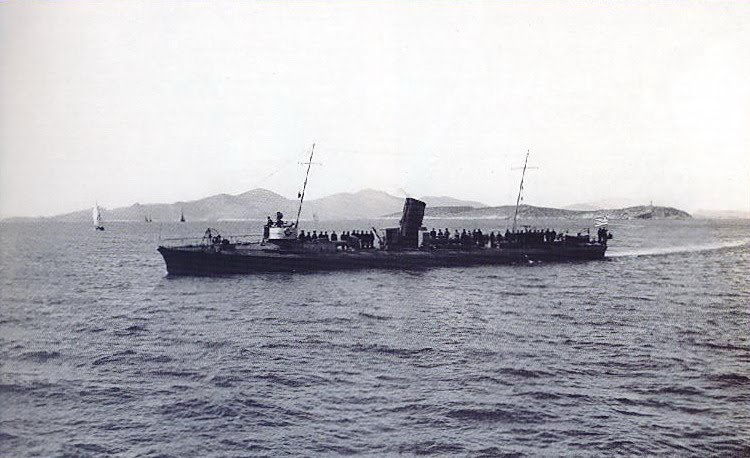
- Nikopolis, formally Antalya, in 1913 under Greek control

History

Ottoman Empire
- Name: Ankara
- Owner: Ottoman Navy
- Builder: Ansaldo, Armstrong & Co, Genoa
- Way number: 134
- Laid down: April 1904
- Launched: 1904
- Acquired: 29 November 1906
- Commissioned: December 1906
- Fate: Scuttled, 1912

History

Kingdom of Greece
- Name: Nikopolis
- Owner: Greek Navy
- Acquired: 1912
- Commissioned: 1913
- Fate: Disposed of, 1921

General characteristics
- Class & type: Antalya-class torpedo boat
- Displacement: 165 long tons (168 t)
- Length: 165 ft 8 in (50.5 m) (between perpendiculars)
- Beam: 18 ft 8 in (5.7 m)
- Draft: 4 ft 7 in (1.4 m)
- Installed power: 2,400 ihp (1,800 kW)
- Propulsion: 2 × engines; 2 × boilers; 2 propellers
- Speed: 24 knots (44 km/h; 28 mph)
- Capacity: 60 long tons (61 t) of coal
- Complement: 20
- Armament: 2 × 37 mm (1.5 in) guns; 2 × 356 mm (14.0 in) torpedo tubes

Antalya was a Antalya-class torpedo boat built in Italy for the Ottoman Navy in 1904. Commissioned in 1906, she was routed during the Battle of Preveza in 1911 and scuttled during the First Balkan War on 31 October 1912 when the port she was in surrendered. She was salvaged by Greece in 1912 and renamed Nikopolis; she operated with the Royal Greek Navy for three years until the ship was decommissioned in 1916.

== Development and design ==
In the early 20th century, Sultan Abdul Hamid II began a modest modernization of the neglected Ottoman Navy following a buildup of the rival Greek Navy. Rather than construct ships for their military capabilities, his government ordered warships from foreign governments as a diplomatic measure to serve as compensation for the destruction of foreign assets during domestic unrest in the 1890s. In 1904, the Navy ordered seven torpedo boats from Italy, with a similar design to the Akhisar-class torpedo boat ordered several years prior. The orders from Ansaldo, Armstrong & Co in Genoa were the last part of compensation payments to Italy.

The seven Antalya-class torpedo boats had a length between perpendiculars of 165 feet 8 inches (50.5 m), with a beam of 18 feet 8 inches (5.7 m) and a draught of 4 feet 7 inches (1.4 m). They displaced 165 long tons (168 t) and carried a complement of 20. Propulsion was provided by two propellers powered by triple-expansion steam engines supplied by two locomotive-type boilers. The first two vessels developed 2,700 indicated horsepower (2,000 kW) and had a maximum speed of 27 knots (50 km/h; 31 mph), while the remaining seven produced 2,400 indicated horsepower (1,800 kW) and had a maximum speed of 24 knots (44 km/h; 28 mph). The boats carried 60 long tons (61 t) of coal. Armament consisted of two 37 mm (1.5 in) Hotchkiss revolving cannon and two 356 mm (14.0 in) torpedo tubes.

== Service history ==
=== Ottoman service ===
Initially designated Yard Number 134, Ankara was laid down in April 1904, launched that year and conducted sea trials throughout 1905 before she was handed over to the Ottomans at Genoa on 29 November 1906. She was commissioned in December at Istanbul. At the outbreak of the Italo-Turkish War, the Ottoman Navy dispatched four torpedo boats stationed at Preveza to reinforce the Adriatic and sail to Shëngjin, Albania. On the day Italy declared war—29 September 1911—Antalya and her sister ship Tokad were intercepted by four Italian Soldato-class destroyers off Kanali during the voyage in what became the Battle of Preveza. The Italian destroyers were more better and better armed; Tokad was heavily damaged and fled North while Antalya suffered minor damage and retreated South to Preveza. A year later during the First Balkan War, the garrison commander of Preveza had Antalya, two gunboats, and the damaged Tokad scuttled before the port was surrendered during the Siege of Ioannina on 31 October 1912.

=== Greek service ===
Antalya was salvaged by the Greeks in November 1912 and commissioned into the Royal Greek Navy as Nikopolis in the next year. Alongside the captured Tokad, which was renamed Tatoi, the two torpedo boats were refitted with two single 1 pound (0.45 kg) guns and a torpedo tube. Nikopolis operated for three years, was decommissioned in 1916, and disposed of in 1921.
