= Instituto Escuela =

Instituto Escuela can refer to:

- Instituto Escuela del Sur, a private middle school and high school in Tlalpan, Mexico City
- U.E. Instituto Escuela (Caracas)
- Instituto Escuela (Madrid)
