= Executive College =

College in Kuching, Sarawak, Malaysia

- Institut Eksekutif
- Established: 2004
- Location: Kuching, Sarawak, Malaysia

The Executive College (Malay: Institut Eksekutif) is a private higher education institution, established in 2004 in Kuching, Sarawak, Malaysia.

The facilities in IE include campus' resources such as computer labs, libraries, theatres, and lecture rooms.

IE was one of the first five private educational institutions in Malaysia to achieve Full Lembaga Akreditasi Negara (now known as Malaysian Qualifications Agency) status and Board of Quantity Surveyors Malaysia (BQSM) recognition status for its Quantity Surveying program. Its Business Administration and Civil Engineering programs are certified as Full Lembaga Akreditasi Negara (LAN) or Malaysian Qualifications Agency (MQA) recognition status.
