= Ie, Noardeast-Fryslân =

Ie
- Village
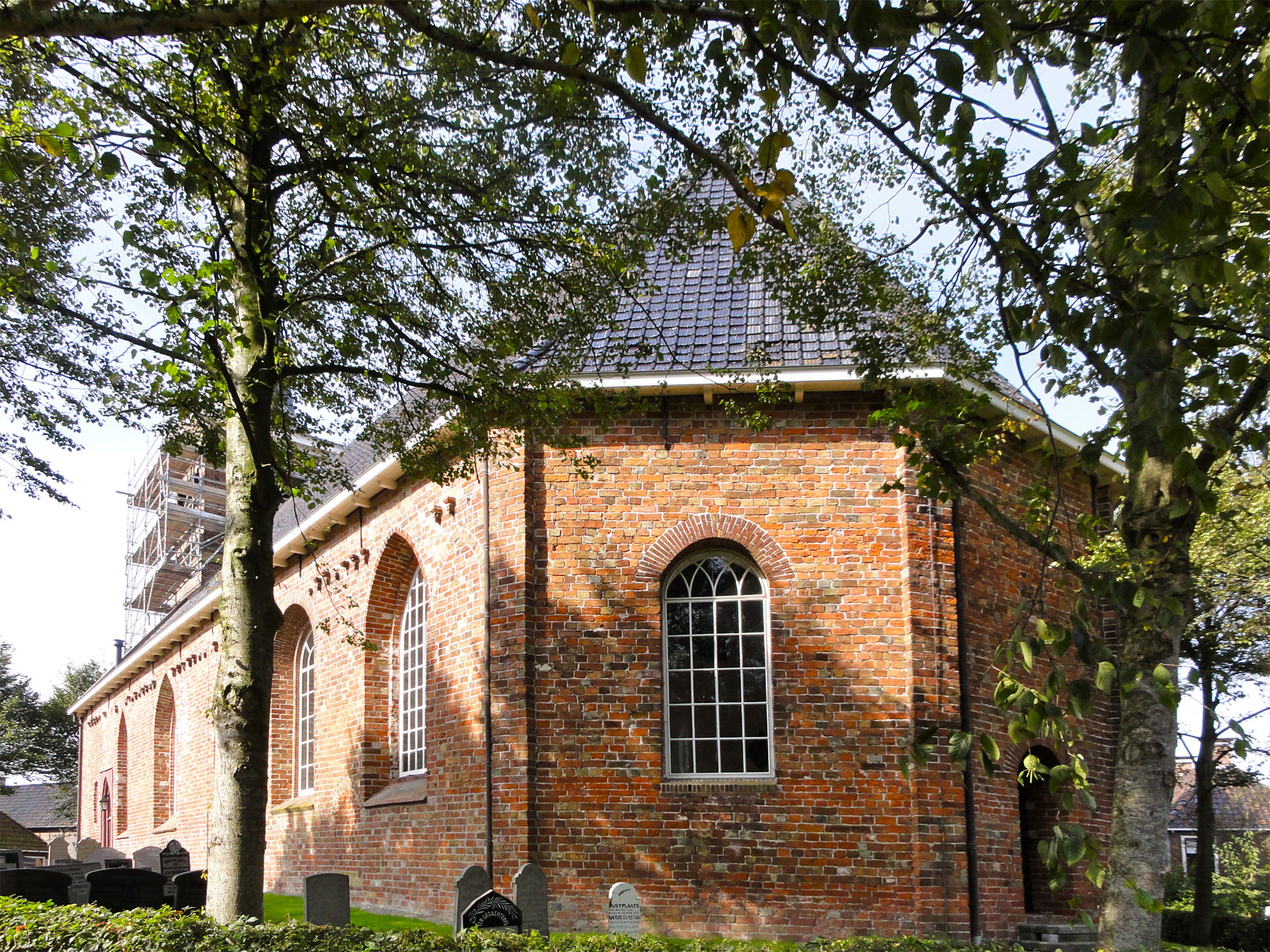
- St Gangulf church

- Flag Coat of arms

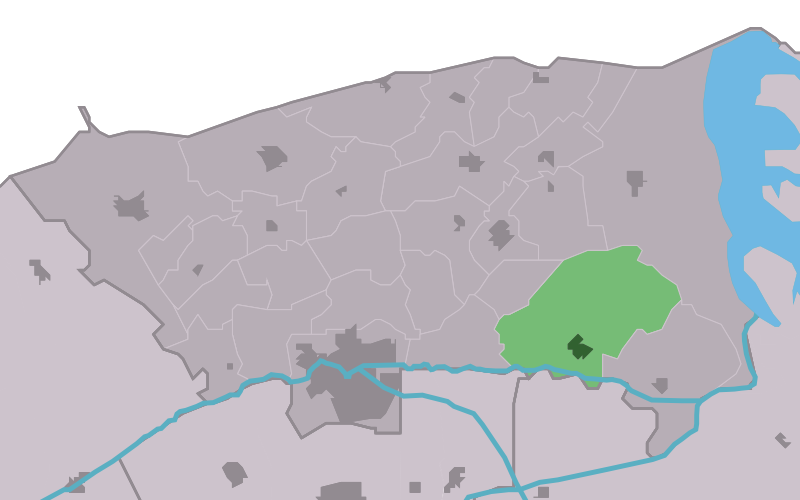
- Location in the former Dongeradeel municipality

- Location in the Netherlands Ie (Netherlands)
- Country: Netherlands
- Province: Friesland
- Municipality: Noardeast-Fryslân

Area
  - Total: 13.26 km^{2} (5.12 sq mi)
- Elevation: 0.2 m (0.66 ft)

Population (2021)
  - Total: 645
  - Density: 48.6/km^{2} (126/sq mi)
- Time zone: UTC+1 (CET)
  - Summer (DST): UTC+2 (CEST)
- Postal code: 9131
- Dialing code: 0519
- Website: Official

Ie is a village in the northern Netherlands. It is located in the municipality of Noardeast-Fryslân, Friesland, east of Dokkum. Ie had approximately 834 inhabitants in January 2017. Before 2019, the village was part of the Dongeradeel municipality.

There are various types of buildings in Ie, including a church built in the 13th century. A flax museum of the Netherlands is also located in Ie. Ie has mostly remained an intact rural village.

Ie has the shortest name of all places in the Netherlands.

== History ==
The village was first mentioned in 1450 as Ee, and means "water / river". Ie is a terp (artificial living mound) village with a radial structure. It developed several centuries before Christ. The Dutch Reformed church dates from the 16th century and has a 13th-century nave. The tower was built in 1869. Up to 1729, a dike made inland navigation, and the nearby hamlet of Tibma had to be used as inland harbour.

Ie was densely populated. There was no construction outside the terp until the 18th century. In 1840, Ie was home to 904 people.

The village's official name was changed from Ee to Ie in 2023.

== Transportation ==
The N 358 passes through town.

Bus routes 63 and 562 connect Ie with Dokkum.

== Gallery ==
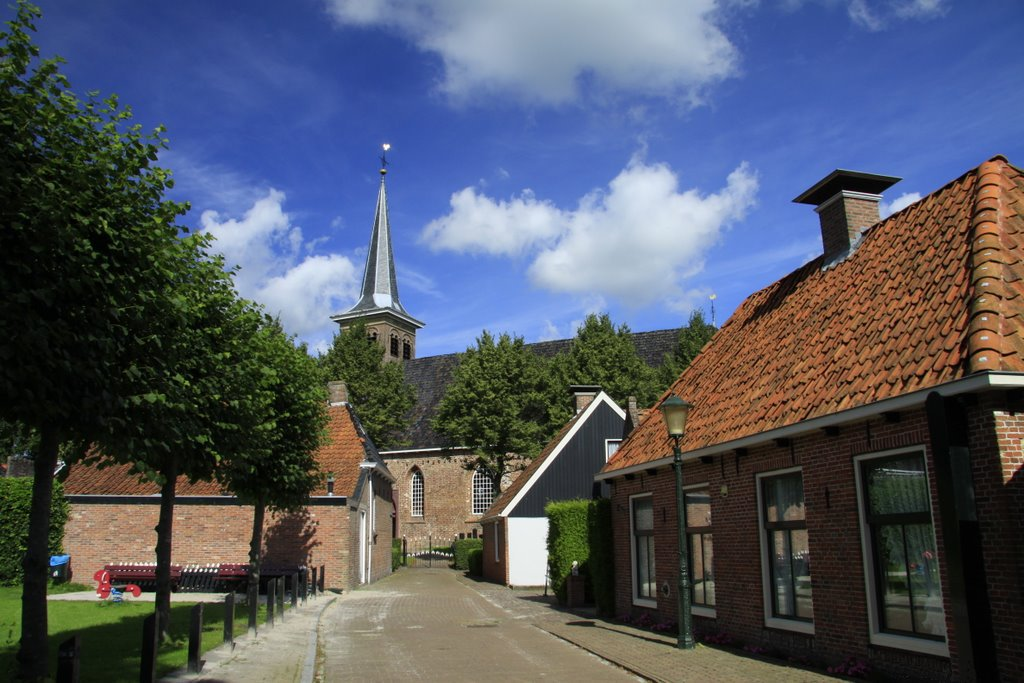
View on Ie

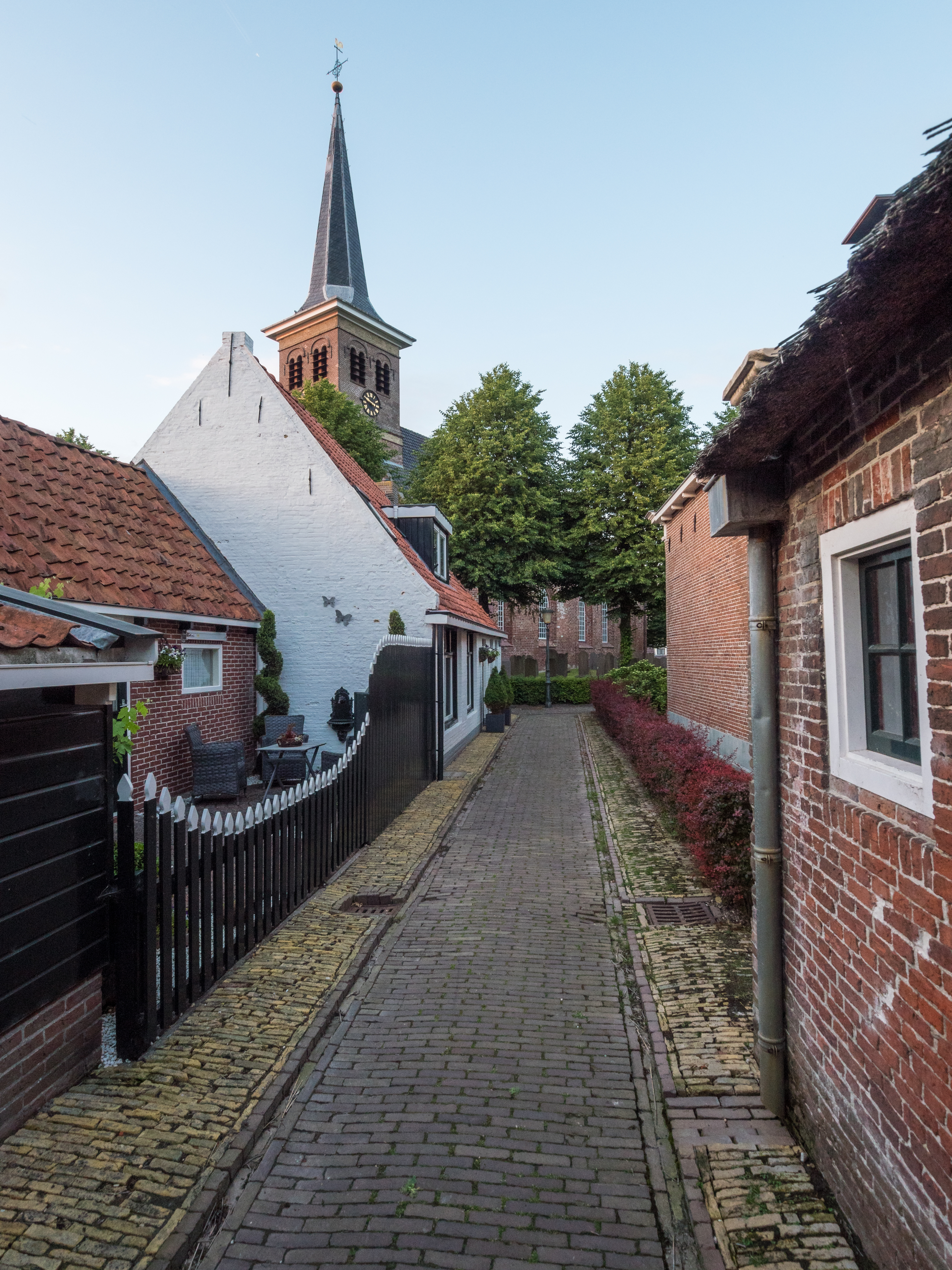
Alley in Ie

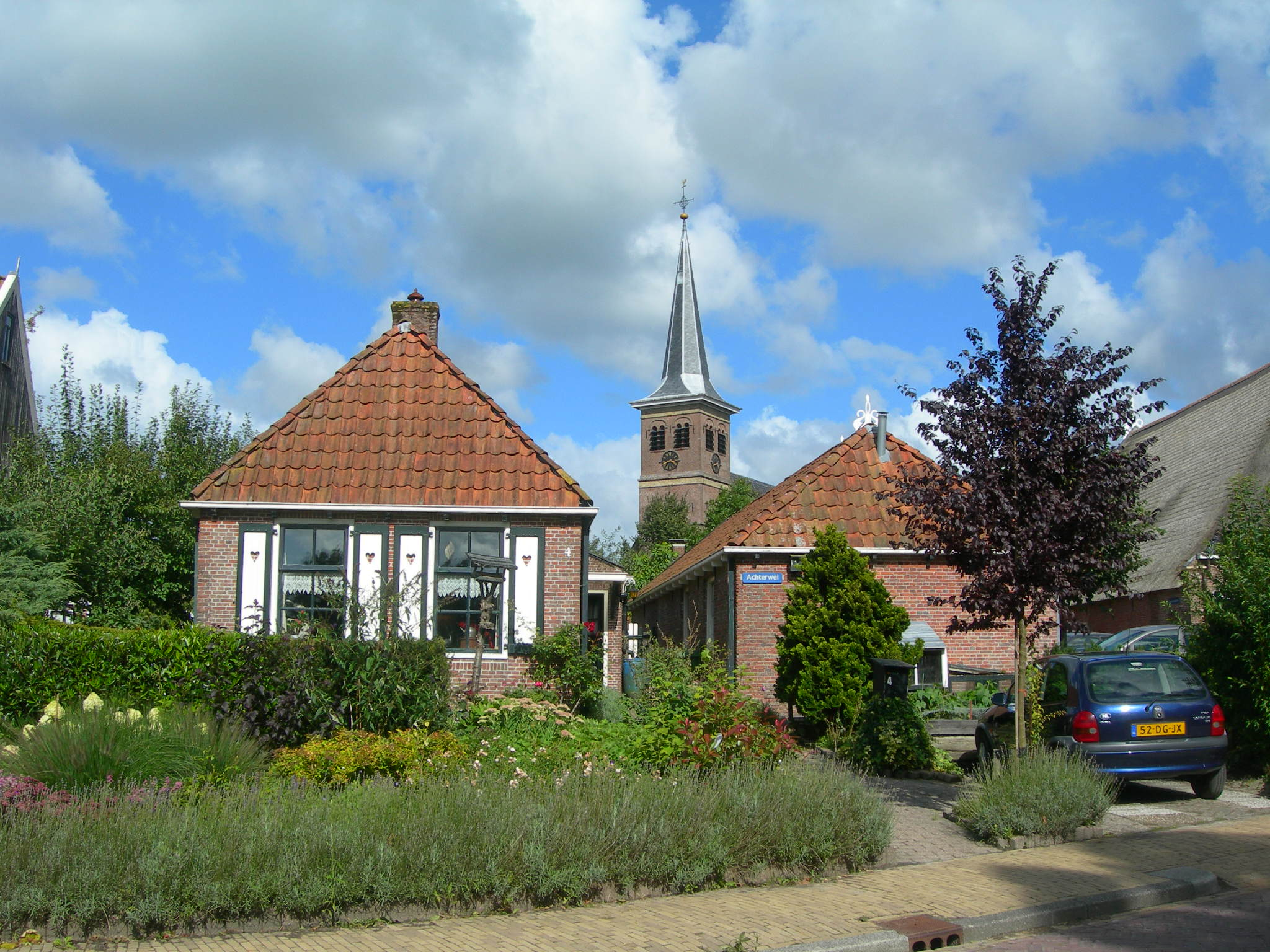
Road in Ie

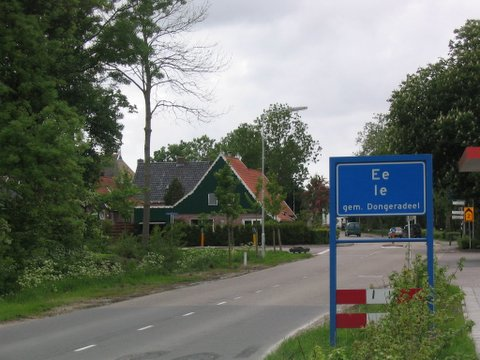
Sign at the entrance of town
