= Akhisar-class torpedo boat =

Ottoman torpedo boat class

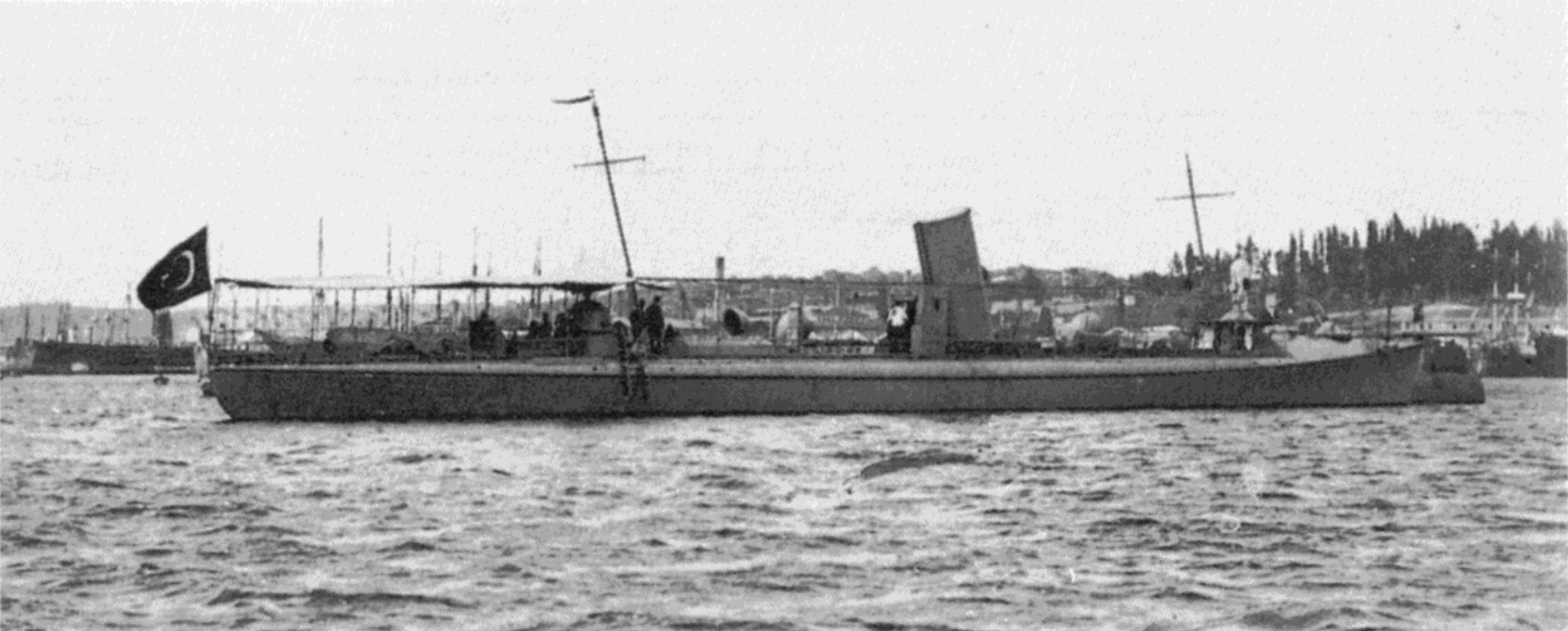
- Lead of her class Akhisar in 1906

Class overview
- Name: Akhisar-class
- Builders: Ansaldo, Armstrong & Co, Genoa
- Operators: Ottoman Navy; Turkish Navy
- Built: 1904
- In service: 1904–1927
- Completed: 2
- Lost: 1
- Scrapped: 1

General characteristics
- Type: Torpedo boat
- Displacement: 165 long tons (168 t)
- Length: 165 ft 8 in (50.5 m)
- Beam: 18 ft 8 in (5.7 m)
- Draft: 4 ft 7 in (1.4 m)
- Installed power: 2,700 ihp (2,000 kW)
- Propulsion: 2 × engines; 2 × boilers; 2 propellers
- Speed: 27 knots (50 km/h; 31 mph)
- Capacity: 60 long tons (61 t) of coal
- Complement: 30
- Armament: 2 × 37 mm (1.5 in) guns; 2 × 356 mm (14.0 in) torpedo tubes

The Akhisar-class torpedo boat was a pair of torpedo boats operated by the Ottoman Navy. Ordered as part of an effort to modernize the Ottoman fleet, they were built in Italy in 1904 with a similar design to Italian torpedo boats. An additional seven Ottoman torpedo boats ordered from the same shipyard are sometimes considered to be apart of the class. The two torpedo boats, Akhisar and Alpagot, were commissioned in 1904. Alpagot was sunk during the Italo-Turkish War and Akhisar survived World War I, operated by the subsequent Turkish Navy, and decommissioned in 1927.

== Development and design ==
In the early 20th century, Sultan Abdul Hamid II began a modest modernization of the neglected Ottoman Navy following a buildup of the rival Greek Navy. Rather than construct ships for their military capabilities, his government ordered warships from foreign governments as a diplomatic measure to serve as compensation for the destruction of foreign assets during domestic unrest in the 1890s. In 1902, the Navy ordered two torpedo boats from Italy, named Akhisar and Alpagot. The duo were known as the Akhisar-class torpedo boat. A further seven were procured two years later, which became the Antalya class. The orders from Ansaldo, Armstrong & Co in Genoa were the last part of compensation payments to Italy.

The Akhisar and Antalya-class torpedo boats featured a nearly identical design based on the Italian torpedo boat Condore and are sometimes treated as one class of nine ships. The Akhisar-class torpedo boats had a length between perpendiculars of 165 feet 8 inches (50.5 m), with a beam of 18 feet 8 inches (5.7 m) and a draught of 4 feet 7 inches (1.4 m). They displaced 165 long tons (168 t) and carried a complement of 30. Propulsion was provided by two propellers powered by triple-expansion steam engines supplied by two locomotive-type boilers that produced 2,700 indicated horsepower (2,000 kW) and a top speed of 27 knots (50 km/h; 31 mph). They carried 60 long tons (61 t) of coal. Armament at launch consisted of two 37 mm (1.5 in) Hotchkiss revolving cannon and two 356 mm (14.0 in) torpedo tubes.

== Service history ==
Both ships were laid down in 1904, with Akhisar launched on 25 April and Alpagot on 30 April 1904. Following sea trials, they were both commissioned in Istanbul in June. In the first naval battle of the Italo-Turkish War, Alpagot was shelled and sunk by Italian destroyers Artigliere and Corazziere during the Battle of Preveza (1911). By World War I, Akhisar and the remaining Antalya-class ships were obsolete and worn out, but the Navy lacked replacements. As a result, the ships were used in various duties such as escorting convoys, searching for enemy submarines, and clearing mines. Following World War I, most of the Ottoman fleet was interned in accordance with the Armistice of Mudros. Akhisar was briefly interned, but allowed to patrol the Sea of Marmara to suppress weapons smuggling. The Treaty of Sèvres allowed the newly formed Turkey to operate several former Ottoman warships. Akhisar was one of six torpedo boats granted to the Turkish Navy with no torpedoes and only one 77 mm (3.0 in) gun. After a refit, she continued to operate with the Turkish Navy intermediately until she was decommissioned in 1927 and scrapped in 1935.

== Ships in class ==
Data
| Name | Ordered | Laid down | Launched | Commissioned | Fate |
|---|---|---|---|---|---|
| Akhisar | December 1902 | 1904 | 1904 | June 1904 | Decommissioned in 1927, broken up in 1935 |
| Alpagot | December 1902 | 1904 | 30 April 1904 | June 1904 | Sunk 30 September 1911 |
