= HMS E2 =

Submarine of the Royal Navy

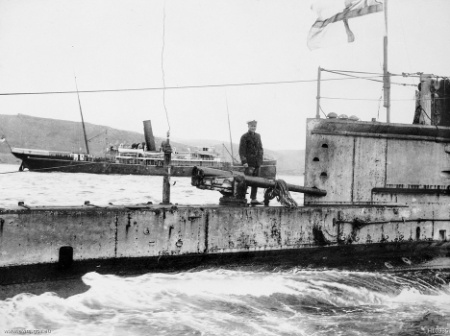
- Lt-Cmdr D de B Stocks on deck after a mission in the Dardanelles, circa. August 1915

History

United Kingdom
- Name: E2
- Builder: HM Dockyard, Chatham
- Laid down: 14 February 1911
- Launched: 23 November 1912
- Completed: 30 June 1913
- Fate: Sold, 7 March 1921

General characteristics
- Class & type: E-class submarine
- Displacement: 652 long tons (662 t) surfaced; 795 long tons (808 t) submerged
- Length: 178 ft (54 m)
- Beam: 15 ft 5 in (4.70 m)
- Propulsion: 2 × 800 hp (597 kW) diesel; 2 × 420 hp (313 kW) electric; 2 screws
- Speed: 15 knots (28 km/h; 17 mph) surfaced; 9.5 knots (17.6 km/h; 10.9 mph) submerged
- Range: 3,000 nmi (5,600 km) at 10 kn (19 km/h; 12 mph); 65 nmi (120 km) at 5 kn (9.3 km/h; 5.8 mph)
- Complement: 31
- Armament: 4 × 18-inch (450-mm) torpedo tubes (1 bow, 2 beam, 1 stern)

HMS E2 (originally ordered as HMS D10) was a British E class submarine built by Chatham Dockyard. E2 was laid down on 14 February 1911 and launched on 23 November 1912.

She was sold 7 March 1921 to B Zammit, Malta.

== Design ==
The early British E-class submarines, from E1 to E8, had a displacement of 652 long tons (662 t) at the surface and 795 long tons (808 t) while submerged. They had a length overall of 180 feet (55 m) and a beam of 22 feet 8.5 inches (6.922 m), and were powered by two 800 horsepower (600 kW) Vickers eight-cylinder two-stroke diesel engines and two 420 horsepower (310 kW) electric motors. The class had a maximum surface speed of 16 knots (30 km/h; 18 mph) and a submerged speed of 10 knots (19 km/h; 12 mph), with a fuel capacity of 50 long tons (51 t) of diesel affording a range of 3,225 miles (5,190 km; 2,802 nmi) when travelling at 10 knots (19 km/h; 12 mph), while submerged they had a range of 85 miles (137 km; 74 nmi) at 5 knots (9.3 km/h; 5.8 mph).

The early 'Group 1' E class boats were armed with four 18 inch (450 mm) torpedo tubes, one in the bow, one either side amidships, and one in the stern; a total of eight torpedoes were carried. Group 1 boats were not fitted with a deck gun during construction, but those involved in the Dardanelles campaign had guns mounted forward of the conning tower while at Malta Dockyard.

E-Class submarines had wireless systems with 1 kilowatt (1.3 hp) power ratings; in some submarines, these were later upgraded to 3 kilowatts (4.0 hp) systems by removing a midship torpedo tube. Their maximum design depth was 100 feet (30 m) although in service some reached depths of below 200 feet (61 m). Some submarines contained Fessenden oscillator systems.

== Crew ==
Her complement was three officers and 28 men.

== Service history ==
When war was declared with Germany on 5 August 1914, E2 was based at Harwich, in the 8th Submarine Flotilla of the Home Fleets.

On 14 August 1915, E2 sank Turkish minelayer Samsun with her two officers and eight crew near Erdek.

== Bibliography ==
- Colledge, J. J.; Warlow, Ben (2006) [1969]. Ships of the Royal Navy: The Complete Record of All Fighting Ships of the Royal Navy from the 15th Century to the Present (3rd Rev ed.). London: Chatham Publishing. ISBN 978-1-86176-281-8. OCLC 67375475.
