= Seacock =

Valve on the hull of a boat

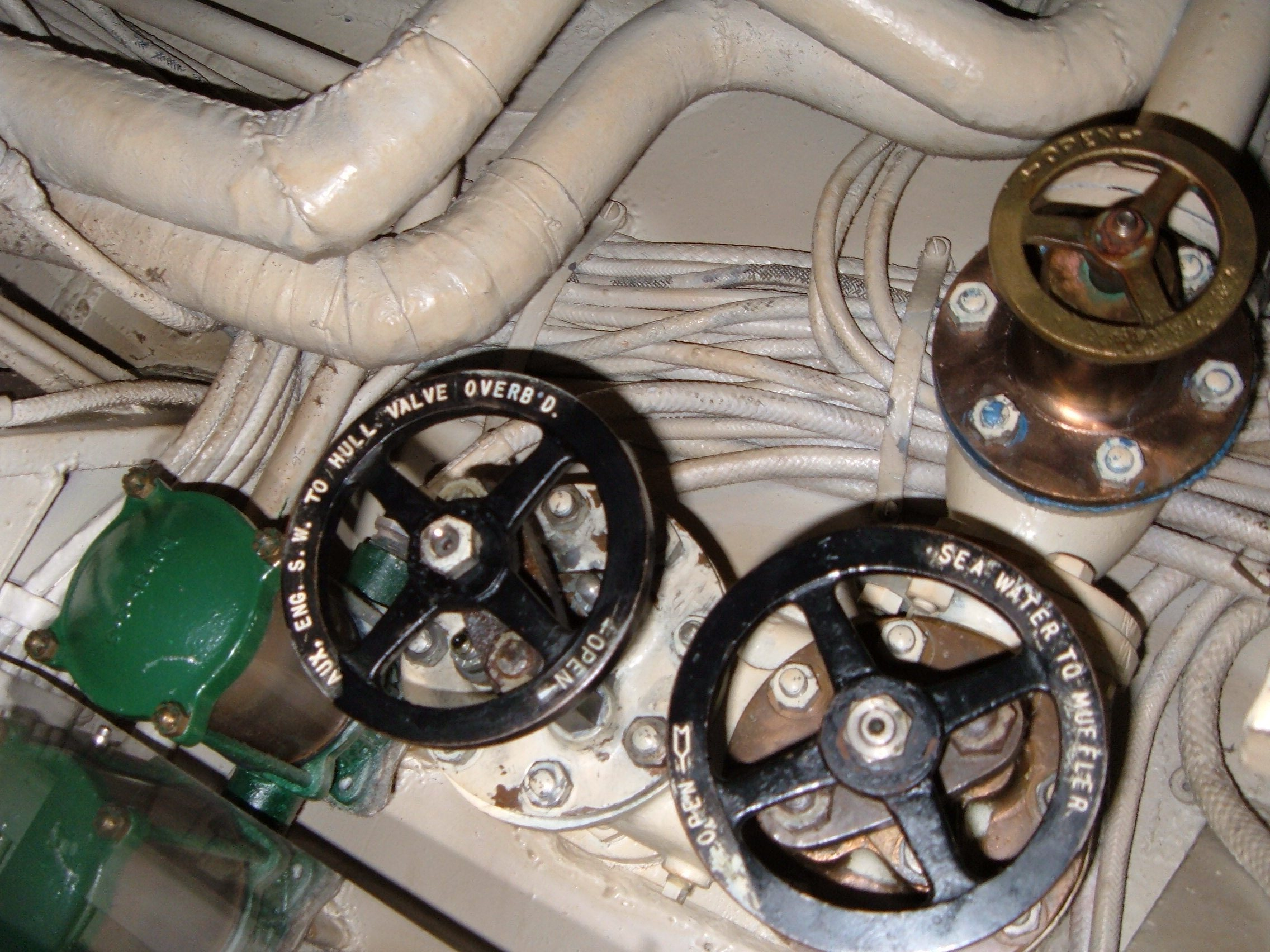
Engine room sea water valves

A seacock is a valve on the hull of a boat or a ship, permitting water to flow into the vessel, such as for cooling an engine or for a salt water faucet; or out of the boat, such as for a sink drain or a toilet. Seacocks are often Kingston valves.

Seacocks are left open or are closed depending on the situation. Seacocks feeding into or out of a closed system, like the engine cooling system, are almost always left open. Seacocks connected to something open, such as a sink drain, might be opened up in port but closed when at sea. The reason for this is that when the boat is level, the drain or other opening will always be above the waterline, and so water will only flow out. At sea, when the boat rolls in the waves, the opening may sometimes be below the waterline. If the seacock is open, water may flood the boat, causing it to sink.

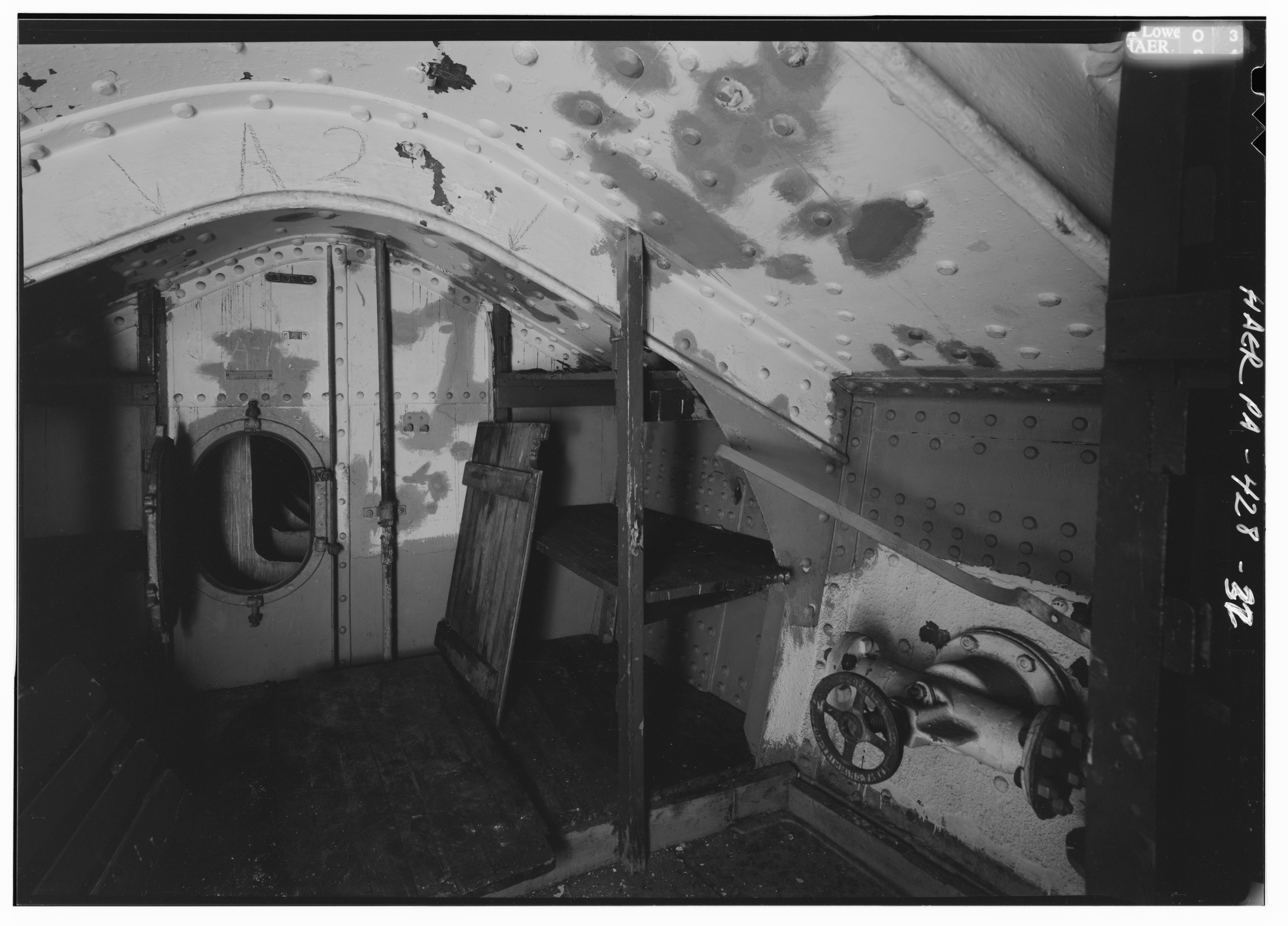
Sea valve at lower right

Along the same lines, some seacocks on warships are designed to flood the ship when opened. Typically, this is done to magazines to prevent detonation of the ammunition in the event of fire, such as the case with HMS Glatton or to maintain trim due to battle damage (counterflooding). Opening the seacocks is one of the main methods used to scuttle a ship so that it cannot be captured by an opponent (for example in the scuttling of the German fleet at Scapa Flow in 1919).

Seacocks can be constructed from either metal or plastic components.

The Royal Yacht Association recommends that replacement sea-cocks for recreational vessels should nowadays comply with ISO 9093-1.
