= Ottoman torpedo boat Alpagot =

Ottoman torpedo boat

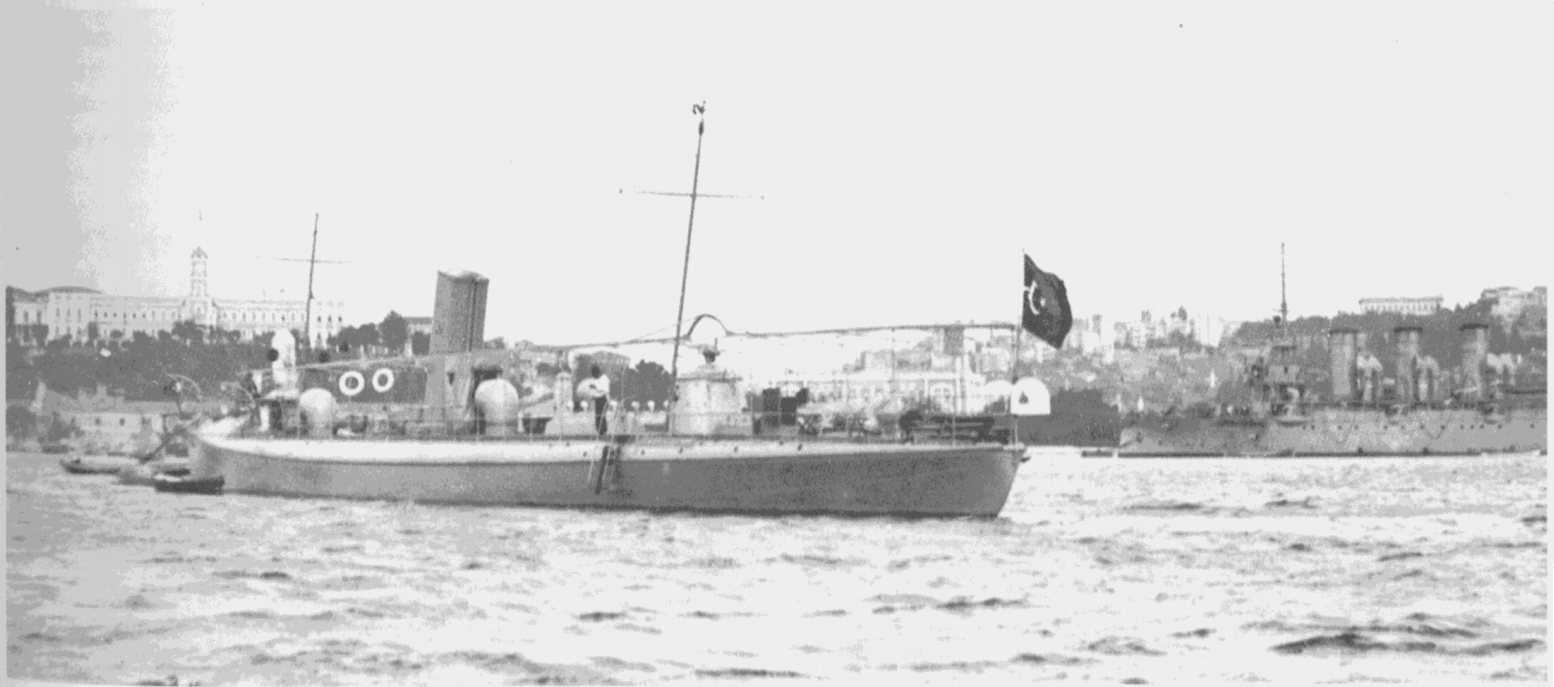
- Alpagot in Istanbul, 1910

History

Ottoman Empire
- Name: Alpagot
- Ordered: December 1902
- Builder: Ansaldo, Armstrong & Cie, Genoa
- Laid down: 1904
- Launched: 30 April 1904
- Commissioned: June 1904
- Fate: Sunk by Italian destroyers, 30 September 1911

General characteristics as built
- Class & type: Akhisar-class torpedo boat
- Displacement: 165 t (162 long tons)
- Length: 50.5 m (165 ft 8 in) (p/p)
- Beam: 5.7 m (18 ft 8 in)
- Draft: 1.4 m (4 ft 7 in)
- Installed power: 2 × Ansaldo boilers; 2,400 hp (1,800 kW)
- Propulsion: 2 × Shafts; 2 × steam engines
- Speed: 24 knots (44 km/h; 28 mph)
- Complement: 4 officers, 26 enlisted men
- Armament: 2 × 37 mm (1.5 in) Hotchkiss guns; 2 × 450 mm (18 in) torpedo tubes

Alpagot was one of the two Akhisar-class torpedo boats built in Italy for the Ottoman Navy in the early 20th century. The ship was launched on April 30, 1904 at the Ansaldo shipyard in Genoa, and was commissioned in June 1904. She took part in the Italo-Turkish War, during which she was sunk in Preveza on September 30, 1911.

== Technical data ==
The Akhisar-class torpedo boats had a hull made of steel, divided into nine watertight compartments. Their overall length was 51 m (167 ft 4 in) (50.5 m (165 ft 8 in) between perpendiculars), their width was 5.7 m (18 ft 8 in) and their draft was 1.4 m (4 ft 7 in). They weighed 165 t (162 long tons). The boats were powered by two vertical three-cylinder triple-expansion steam engines with a total power of 2,400 hp (1,800 kW), to which steam was supplied by two boilers that came from locomotive engines (also made by Ansaldo). The maximum speed of the boats, which were propelled by two screws, was 24 knots The ships carried a reserve of 60 tons of coal.

Their artillery armament consisted of two single 37 mm quick-firing Hotchkiss guns. Torpedo weapons consisted of two 450 mm deck-mounted single rotatable torpedo launchers mounted behind and in front of the bridge.

The ship's crew consisted of 4 officers and 26 non-commissioned officers and sailors. (Note: Gardiner & Gray states that the ship's crew numbered 20.)

== Construction ==
The torpedo boats of the Akhisar-class were ordered by the Ottoman Empire from Italy in December 1902 and a contract was signed that month for the delivery of two vessels.

Alpagot was built at the Ansaldo shipyard in Genoa (shipyard number 132). The keel of the ship was laid in 1904, and was launched on 30 April 1904.

== Operational history ==
Having joined the Ottoman Navy in June 1904, Alpagot took part in training in May 1909 as part of the reforming program of Admiral Douglas Gamble, commander of the British naval mission in Istanbul. During this training, the flagships Mesudiye, Asar-ı Tevfik and Mecidiye were positioned between Büyükada and Maltepe, while Peyk-i Şevket, Berk-i Satvet, Samsun and her sister Yarhisar guarded the passages between the Princes' Islands. The torpedo boats Draç, Mosul, Kütahya, Alpagot, Hamidiye, Demirhisar and Sivrihisar sailed from Sivriada and joined the fleet, practicing torpedo attacks against larger ships. Representatives of the United Kingdom observed the exercise from the Tirimüjgan. Although the exercise was not in realistic combat conditions, it was the first naval exercise of the Ottoman Navy in twenty years. At the end of the exercise, all ships passed in front of the royal yacht Ertuğrul, which was waiting off Sarayburnu.

On 30 September 1911, during the Italo-Turkish War, Alpagot and the torpedo boat Hamidiye were stationed in the port of Preveza when they were attacked by gunfire from the Italian destroyers Artigliere and Corazziere. The two torpedo boats were unable to return fire before they were sunk.
