= Piedmont (disambiguation) =

Piedmont is a region in Northwest Italy.

In physical geography, piedmont denotes a region of foothills in a mountain range.

Piedmont may also refer to:

== Regions in the United States ==
- Piedmont (plateau), a plateau between the Atlantic Plain and Appalachian Mountains
  - Central North Carolina, the Piedmont region of North Carolina
    - Piedmont Crescent, an urban area in North Carolina
      - Piedmont Triad, a region centered on three cities in North Carolina
  - Piedmont region of Virginia
- Colorado Piedmont, a valley in the foothills of the Front Range in Colorado

== Populated places ==
=== Canada ===
- Piedmont, Nova Scotia
- Piedmont, Quebec

=== United States ===
- Piedmont, Alabama
- Piedmont, California
- Piedmont, Georgia
- Piedmont, Kansas
- Piedmont, Missouri
- Piedmont, Ohio
- Piedmont, Oklahoma
- Piedmont, Portland, Oregon, a neighborhood in Portland, Oregon
- Piedmont, South Carolina, a census-designated place
- Piedmont, South Dakota
- Piedmont, Virginia (disambiguation)
- Piedmont, Washington
- Piedmont, West Virginia
  - Piedmont, Mercer County, West Virginia
- Piedmont, Wyoming

== Colleges ==
- Piedmont University, in Demorest, Georgia
- Piedmont Community College, in Rixboro, North Carolina
- Piedmont Technical College, with several locations in South Carolina
- Central Piedmont Community College, in Charlotte, North Carolina
- Georgia Piedmont Technical College, in Clarkston, Georgia
- Piedmont Virginia Community College, in Albemarle County, Virginia
- Piedmont Baptist College, in Winston-Salem, North Carolina
- South Piedmont Community College, in Anson and Union counties, North Carolina
- Western Piedmont Community College, in Morganton, North Carolina

== People ==
- Prince of Piedmont
  - James of Piedmont (1315–1367), Lord of Piedmont from 1334
  - Louis of Piedmont (1364–1418), Lord of Piedmont and titular Prince of Achaea from 1402
- Matt Piedmont (born 1970), American writer
- Nicolaas Piemont (1644–1709), Dutch Golden Age landscape painter

== Transportation ==
- Piedmont (automobile), a car made by the Piedmont Motor Car Company of Lynchburg, Virginia
- Piedmont (train), an Amtrak passenger train in North Carolina
- Piedmont Airlines, a regional airline operating under the name American Eagle
- Piedmont Airlines (1948–1989), an airline that was merged into US Air
- Piedmont Limited, a former passenger train of the Southern Railway (US)

== Other uses ==
- Piedmont (Greenwood, Virginia), a historic house and farm in Virginia in the United States
- Piedmont wine, the range of Italian wines made in the region of Piedmont
- Piedmont blues or "Piedmont fingerstyle", a style of blues guitar playing
- Piedmont League, defunct minor league baseball organization in the United States
- Kingdom of Piedmont-Sardinia, the name given to the possessions of the House of Savoy in 1723
- Piedmont, Arizona, fictional setting for part of the miniseries The Andromeda Strain
- The Cumberland Rooters, a minor league baseball team in the United States known briefly as "Piedmont" during 1907
- Ice piedmont, a geographic feature
- Piedmont Atlanta Hospital, a hospital in Atlanta, Georgia.

== See also ==
- Piedmont Avenue (disambiguation)
- Piedmont Council
- Piedmont High School (disambiguation)
- Piedmont Hotel
- Piemonte (disambiguation)
- Beskidian Piedmont (disambiguation)
