= Piemonte (disambiguation) =

Piemonte is the Italian name for Piedmont, a region of northern Italy.

Piemonte may also refer to:

- Piemonte (wine)
- Piemonte FC (Piemonte Football Club)
- 5162 Piemonte, a main-belt asteroid
- 29th Infantry Division "Piemonte", an infantry division of Italy of the Second World War
- Italian cruiser Piemonte, former warship
- SS Principe di Piemonte, former passenger ship

== People with the surname ==
- Gabriel Piemonte (1909-1991), American attorney and politician
- Martina Piemonte (born 1997), Italian footballer
- Patrick Piemonte, American inventor and computer scientist

== See also ==
- Piemonte-Sardinia, the Kingdom of Sardinia
- Piemontesi, a surname
- Piemont (disambiguation)
- Piedmont (disambiguation)
- Piamonte (disambiguation)
