= Italian cruiser Calabria =

Protected cruiser of the Italian Royal Navy

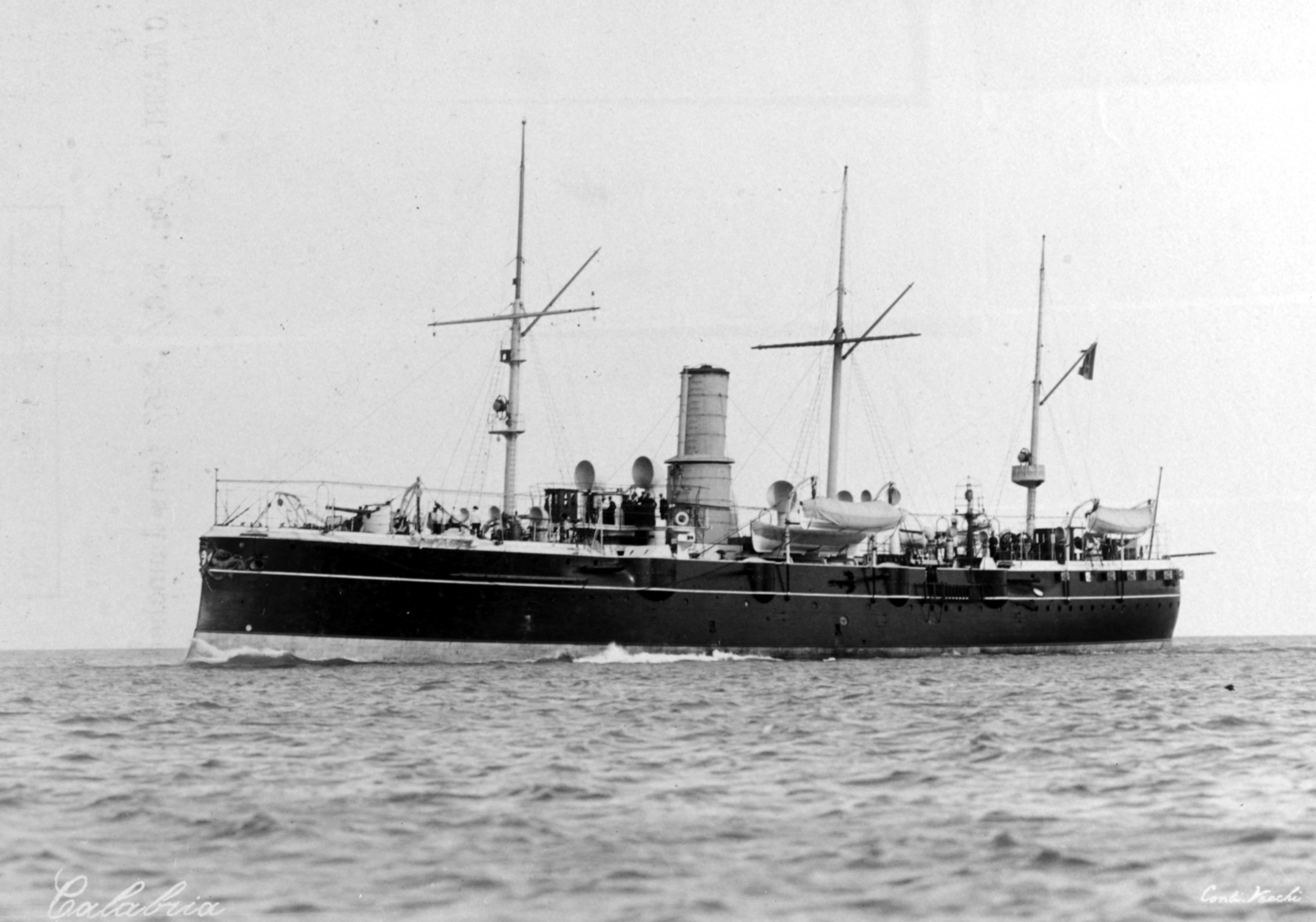
- Calabria photographed soon after completion

Class overview
- Preceded by: Regioni class
- Succeeded by: Libia

History

Italy
- Builder: Arsenale di La Spezia
- Laid down: February 1892
- Launched: 20 September 1894
- Commissioned: 12 July 1897
- Fate: Sold for scrapping, 13 November 1924

General characteristics
- Type: Protected cruiser
- Displacement: Normal: 2,453 long tons (2,492 t); Full load: 2,660 long tons (2,700 t)
- Length: 81 m (265 ft 9 in)
- Beam: 12.71 m (41 ft 8 in)
- Draft: 5.05 m (16 ft 7 in)
- Installed power: 4 × fire-tube boilers; 4,260 ihp (3,180 kW)
- Propulsion: 2 × triple-expansion steam engines; 2 × screw propellers
- Speed: 16.4 knots (30.4 km/h; 18.9 mph)
- Range: 2,500 nmi (4,600 km; 2,900 mi) at 10 knots (19 km/h; 12 mph)
- Complement: 214–254
- Armament: 4 × 15 cm (5.9 in) guns; 4 × 12 cm (4.7 in) guns; 8 × 5.7 cm (2.24 in) guns; 8 × 3.7 cm (1.5 in) guns; 2 × 450 mm (17.7 in) torpedo tubes
- Armor: Deck: 50 mm (2 in); Conning tower: 50 mm

Calabria was a small protected cruiser built for the Italian Regia Marina (Royal Navy) in the 1890s, intended for service in Italy's overseas empire. She was laid down in 1892, launched in 1894, and completed in 1897, and was armed with a main battery of four 15-centimeter (5.9 in) and four 12 cm (4.7 in) guns. Calabria spent significant periods abroad, ranging from deployments to Chinese, North American, and Australian waters, in addition to periods in Italy's East African empire. She saw action during the Italo-Turkish War in 1912 in the Red Sea, primarily bombarding Turkish ports in the area. Calabria was reclassified as a gunboat in 1921, reduced to a training ship in 1924, and sold for scrap at the end of the year.

== Design ==
Plan and profile drawing of Calabria

Calabria was designed by the Chief Engineer, Edoardo Masdea, and was intended for overseas service in the Italian colonial empire. She had a steel hull sheathed with wood and zinc to protect it from fouling during lengthy deployments abroad, where shipyard facilities would not be readily available. The hull was 76 meters (249 ft 4 in) long between perpendiculars and 81 m (265 ft 9 in) long overall. She had a beam of 12.71 m (41 ft 8 in) and a draft of 5.05 m (16 ft 7 in). Her normal displacement was 2,453 long tons (2,492 t) but increased to 2,660 long tons (2,700 t) at full load. She had a flush deck and a ram bow; her superstructure was fairly minimal, consisting primarily of a small conning tower forward. She was fitted with three pole masts for signaling and spotting purposes. Calabria had a crew of between 214 and 254 officers and enlisted crew.

The cruiser was powered by two vertical triple-expansion steam engines that each drove a screw propeller. Steam was supplied by four coal-fired, cylindrical fire-tube boilers that were vented into a single funnel placed amidships, directly astern of the conning tower. The engines had an output of 4,260 indicated horsepower (3,180 kW) and produced a top speed of 16.4 knots (30.4 km/h; 18.9 mph). Calabria had a cruising radius of about 2,500 nautical miles (4,600 km; 2,900 mi) at a more economical speed of 10 knots (19 km/h; 12 mph).

Calabria was armed with a main battery of four 15 cm (5.9 in) L/40 guns, supported by a secondary battery of four 12 cm (4.7 in) L/40 guns, all mounted individually. (Note: L/40 refers to the length of the gun in terms of caliber.) Light armament for close-range defense against torpedo boats included eight 5.7 cm (2.24 in) L/40 guns, eight 3.7 cm (1.5 in) L/20 guns, and a pair of machine guns. She was also equipped with a pair of 450 mm (17.7 in) torpedo tubes. Armor protection consisted of a curved 50 mm (2 in) thick deck that sloped downward at the sides of the hull to provide a measure of vertical protection against incoming fire. Her conning tower also received 50 mm of steel plating on the sides.

== Service history ==
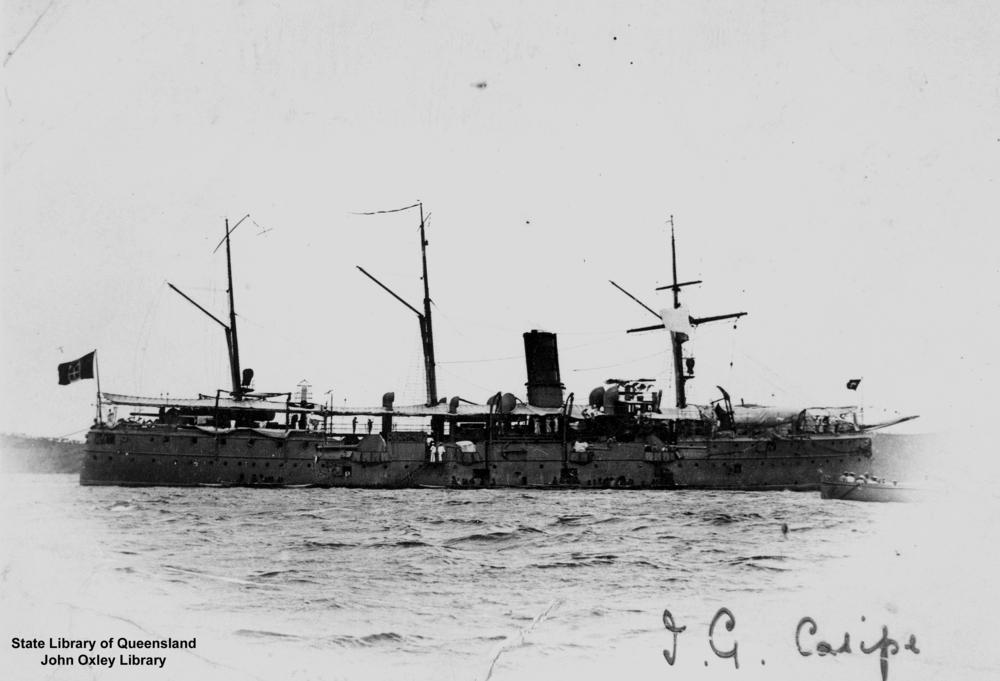
Calabria, probably while in Australia in 1905

Calabria was built at the La Spezia dockyard, with her keel being laid down in February 1892. She was launched on 20 September 1894, and fitting-out work was completed by mid-1897; the new cruiser was commissioned into the Regia Marina (Royal Navy) on 12 July. Upon entering service, Calabria was assigned to the Reserve Division of the Italian fleet, along with the ironclad warships Lepanto, Italia, Duilio, Francesco Morosini, and Ruggiero di Lauria, the protected cruiser Lombardia, the torpedo cruiser Calatafimi, and a pair of torpedo boats.

Calabria spent long periods abroad in her first decade of service. She was operating in Chinese waters in 1899 when the Boxer Uprising broke out. She joined an international fleet that included representatives from the fleets of the Eight Nation Alliance in the mouth of the Hai River while a contingent of 475 soldiers traveled to Beijing to reinforce the Legation Quarter.

The ship was present on 20 May 1902 when the United States formally granted independence to the Republic of Cuba, following the Spanish–American War three years earlier. Calabria and the British protected cruiser HMS Psyche fired salutes to the United States armored cruiser USS Brooklyn. In April 1903, Calabria joined a naval review held for the Japanese Emperor Meiji in Kobe, Japan. The foreign naval contingent included the British pre-dreadnought battleship HMS Glory and protected cruiser Blenheim, the German protected cruiser SMS Hansa, the French protected cruiser Pascal, and the Russian protected cruiser Askold.

Calabria embarked on another major overseas cruise in early 1905 with the then-midshipman Prince Ferdinando aboard, departing Venice on 4 February. By this time, the ship had been fitted with wireless telegraphy equipment. She made a call in Gibraltar before sailing to the West Indies, where she stopped in Santo Domingo in the Dominican Republic. The visit represented an attempt at gunboat diplomacy, aimed at securing payments for debts to Italian nationals. From there, she continued on south to South America, stopping in many ports as she made her way around the continent, including Buenos Aires, Argentina; Rio de Janeiro, Brazil; Montevideo, Uruguay; Callao and Lima, Peru; Valparaíso, Chile; and Acapulco, Mexico. By 11 September, she had reached San Francisco in the United States. Later in the year, as she continued her circumnavigation of the globe, Calabria visited Australia on a trip to show the flag. By May 1906, Calabria was in Chinese waters, and on the 18th, she was present in Nanking in company with the French cruiser Descartes and the German gunboat SMS Vorwärts. In October 1909, Calabria took part in the Portola Festival in San Francisco, marking the 140th anniversary of the Portolà expedition, the first recorded European exploration of what became California.

=== Italo-Turkish War ===
Map of the Red Sea, where Calabria operated during the war

On 29 September 1911, Italy declared war on the Ottoman Empire to seize Ottoman Tripolitania and incorporate it into its overseas empire. The Ottomans intended to distract Italian attention by threatening the colony of Italian Eritrea, across the Red Sea from Ottoman Arabia. For their part, the Italians decided to support anti-Ottoman rebels in Yemen to tie up Ottoman forces away from Tripolitania. At that time, Calabria was stationed in the Far East, but she was immediately recalled to reinforce the naval forces in Eritrea. After arriving in East African waters, she joined the cruiser Puglia in bombarding the Turkish port of Aqaba on 19 November to disperse a contingent of Ottoman soldiers there. Hostilities were temporarily ceased while the British King George V passed through the Red Sea following his coronation ceremony in India—the ceasefire lasted until 26 November. Four days later, Calabria and the gunboat Volturno attacked a quarantine station near Perim. She took part in further attacks at Mokha and Cheikh Saïd.

In early 1912, the Italian Red Sea Fleet searched for a group of seven Ottoman gunboats thought to be planning an attack on Eritrea, though they were in fact immobilized due to a lack of coal. Calabria and Puglia carried out diversionary bombardments against Jebl Tahr, and Al Luḩayyah, while the cruiser Piemonte and the destroyers Artigliere and Garibaldino searched for the gunboats. On 7 January, they found the gunboats and quickly sank four in the Battle of Kunfuda Bay; the other three were forced to beach to avoid sinking as well. The next day, the Italian warships sent a shore party to destroy the grounded gunboats. With the Ottoman naval threat neutralized, the Italians turned their attention to supporting the anti-Ottoman insurgents in the region. Calabria and the rest of the Italian ships returned to bombarding the Turkish ports in the Red Sea before declaring a blockade of the city of Al Hudaydah on 26 January. Calabria returned to Italy by April for refitting. The Ottomans eventually agreed to surrender in October, ending the war.

=== Later career ===
In 1914, her armament was reduced; the 15 cm guns were removed and two additional 12 cm guns were installed in their place. Two of the 5.7 cm guns and six of the 3.7 cm guns were also removed. In January 1915, while Italy was still neutral during World War I, Calabria was sent to the coast of Ottoman Syria to assist with the protection of refugees in the area. During this period, she cooperated with the United States armored cruiser USS North Carolina. The ship took a diplomatic mission from Massawa across the Red Sea to visit Hussein bin Ali, the recently proclaimed King of Hejaz, in Mecca in July 1917. Calabria returned to East African waters in January 1918 on another mission to show the flag, particularly off the coast of Somalia. Stops included Aden and Djibouti. Calabria was reclassified as a gunboat in 1921, and she saw her armament modified again; a 15 cm gun was reinstalled, as were two of the 5.7 cm guns. A 4 cm (1.6 in) L/39 autocannon was also added at this time. She served in this role for only a short time, and was reduced to a training ship for naval gunners in early 1924. This duty ended quickly, and she was sold for scrap on 13 November 1924.
