= Italian cruiser Lombardia =

Protected cruiser of the Italian Royal Navy

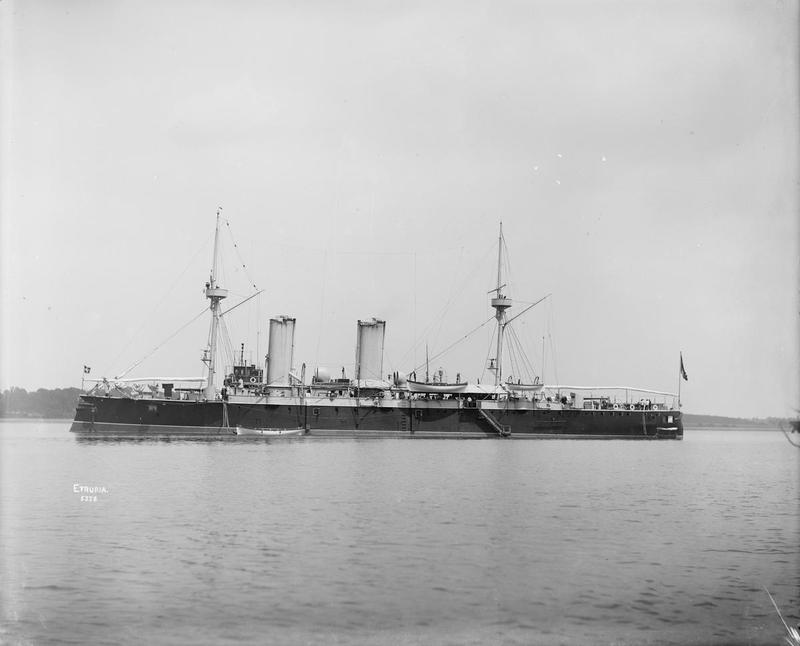
- Lombardia's sister ship Etruria in 1895

History

Italy
- Name: Lombardia
- Namesake: Region of Lombardy
- Builder: Regio Cantiere di Castellammare di Stabia
- Laid down: 19 November 1889
- Launched: 12 July 1890
- Commissioned: 16 February 1893
- Fate: Sold for scrap, 4 July 1920

General characteristics
- Class & type: Regioni-class cruiser
- Displacement: Normal: 2,245 to 2,689 long tons (2,281 to 2,732 t); Full load: 2,411 to 3,110 long tons (2,450 to 3,160 t)
- Length: 84.8 m (278 ft 3 in)
- Beam: 12.03 m (39 ft 6 in)
- Draft: 4.87 m (16 ft 0 in)
- Installed power: 4 × fire-tube boilers; 6,010 ihp (4,480 kW)
- Propulsion: 2 × screw propellers; 2 × triple-expansion steam engines
- Speed: 18.4 knots (34.1 km/h; 21.2 mph)
- Range: 2,100 nmi (3,900 km; 2,400 mi) at 10 knots (19 km/h; 12 mph)
- Complement: 213–278
- Armament: 4 × 15 cm (5.9 in) guns; 6 × 12 cm (4.7 in) guns; 10 × 57 mm (2.24 in) guns; 2 × 450 mm (17.7 in) torpedo tubes
- Armor: Deck: 50 mm (2 in); Conning tower: 50 mm

Lombardia was a protected cruiser of the Italian Regia Marina (Royal Navy) built in the 1890s. The ship was the second of six vessels in its class, but was the first to enter service. Named for the region of Lombardy, she was laid down in November 1889, was launched in July 1890, and was completed in February 1893. The ship was equipped with a main armament of four 15 cm (5.9 in) and six 12 cm (4.7 in) guns, and she could steam at a speed of 18 knots (33 km/h; 21 mph).

Lombardia served in a variety of roles throughout her career. She was initially assigned as a scout for the main Italian fleet before a stint abroad in South America, where an outbreak of yellow fever killed half of her crew. Another period in the main fleet followed in the late 1890s, and in 1901, the ship was deployed to the China station. In late 1903, she cruised off Italian Somaliland, and in 1906 she was converted to a depot ship for submarines. She served in this role for the remainder of her career, including during the Italo-Turkish War in 1911–1912 and World War I in 1915–1918. Lombardia was eventually sold for scrap in July 1920.

== Design ==
Plan and profile drawing of the Regioni class

Lombardia was 84.8 meters (278 ft 3 in) long overall and had a beam of 12.03 m (39 ft 6 in) and a draft of 4.87 m (16 ft 0 in). Specific displacement figures have not survived for individual members of the class, but they displaced 2,245 to 2,689 long tons (2,281 to 2,732 t) normally and 2,411 to 3,110 long tons (2,450 to 3,160 t) at full load. The ships had a ram bow and a flush deck. Each vessel was fitted with a pair of pole masts. She had a crew of between 213 and 278.

Her propulsion system consisted of a pair of horizontal triple-expansion steam engines that drove two screw propellers. Steam was supplied by four cylindrical fire-tube boilers that were vented into two funnels. On her speed trials, she reached a maximum of 18.4 knots (34.1 km/h; 21.2 mph) at 6,010 indicated horsepower (4,480 kW). The ship had a cruising radius of about 2,100 nautical miles (3,900 km; 2,400 mi) at a speed of 10 knots (19 km/h; 12 mph).

Lombardia was armed with a main battery of four 15 cm (5.9 in) L/40 guns mounted singly, with two side by side forward and two side by side aft. A secondary battery of six 12 cm (4.7 in) L/40 guns were placed between them, with three on each broadside. Close-range defense against torpedo boats consisted of ten 57 mm (2.24 in) guns and a pair of machine guns. She was also equipped with two 450 mm (17.7 in) torpedo tubes. Lombardia was protected by a 50 mm (2 in) thick deck, and her conning tower had 50 mm thick sides.

== Service history ==
Lombardia was built by the Regio Cantieri di Castellammare di Stabia in the eponymous city; her keel was laid on 19 November 1889. She was launched on 12 July 1890, and after completing fitting-out work, the new cruiser was commissioned into the Italian fleet on 16 February 1893, the first member of her class to enter service. The new ship did not immediately enter active service, however, and in 1894 was still kept in reserve status along with her sisters Umbria and Etruria. Beginning on 14 October that year, the Italian fleet, including Lombardia, assembled in Genoa for a naval review held in honor of King Umberto I at the commissioning of the new ironclad Re Umberto. The festivities lasted three days.

In late 1895, Lombardia was sent South American waters to relieve her sister ship Liguria, arriving in Rio de Janeiro on 27 November. The city was in the midst of a yellow fever outbreak, which quickly spread to the crew. By February 1896, 137 men out of her crew, including the ship's captain and chief engineer, had died as a result of the epidemic. The men were buried in local cemeteries and were eventually re-interred in a large mausoleum in Rio de Janeiro in 1904. After returning to Italy in 1897, the ship was assigned to the cruiser squadron, alongside Etna and Dogali. For the periodic fleet maneuvers during the year, Lombardia was assigned to the First Division of the Reserve Squadron, which was centered on the ironclad battleships Duilio, Ruggiero di Lauria, and Lepanto. She remained in the Reserve Squadron the following year.

Lombardia was deployed to the China station in 1901 to replace her sister Elba. She was joined on the voyage by the armored cruiser Marco Polo, which in turn replaced Vettor Pisani. In September 1902 Lombardia was in Nagasaki, Japan, with the Italian cruiser Piemonte. The following month, she joined an international fleet that took part in the funeral of the Chinese Viceroy of Liangjiang, Liu Kunyi. Kunyi had protected Europeans during the Boxer Uprising in 1900–1901, for which he was lauded in the Western press. On 10 May 1903, Lombardia went to Shanghai and steamed up the Yangtze River. She thereafter departed the China station. Later that year, Lombardia was stationed in Italian Somaliland where she visited Illig, a small town on cliffs about 150 miles (240 km) northeast of Hobyo. A landing party attempted to go to shore to negotiate with a group of raiders who had fortified the town, but they were driven off by rifle fire. Lombardia shelled the town in response, but to no effect. The ship then made a stop in Aden in late November – early December.

In 1906, Lombardia was converted into a depot ship for submarines; this work lasted until 1908. By the outbreak of the Italo-Turkish War in September 1911, she was still serving in this capacity, under the command of Prince Luigi Amedeo, then the Inspector of Torpedo Boats. Lombardia remained in the Adriatic Sea during the war and as a result she did not see action in the conflict. She served in this capacity through World War I until 4 July 1920, when she was sold for scrap and subsequently broken up.
