= Regioni-class cruiser =

Protected cruiser class of the Italian Royal Navy

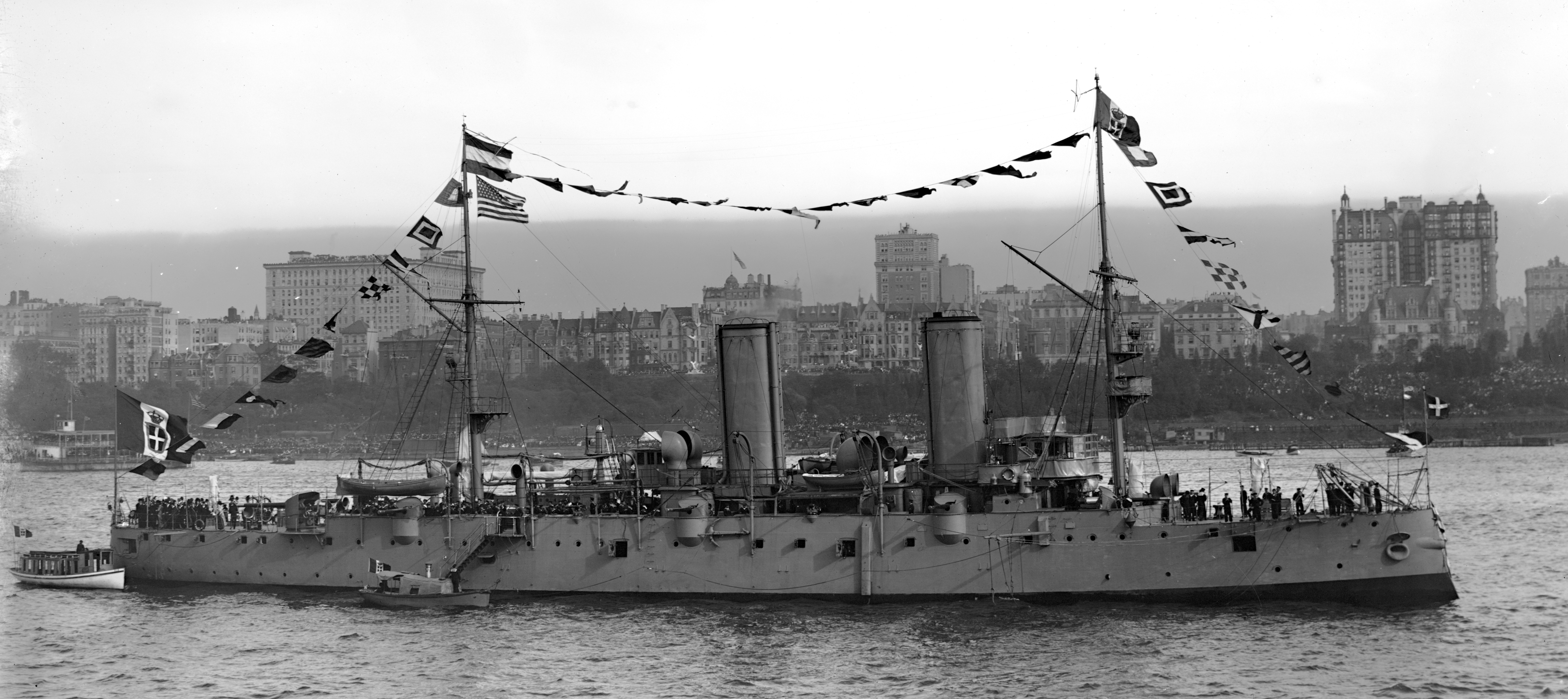
- Etruria in 1909

Class overview
- Preceded by: Piemonte
- Succeeded by: Calabria
- Built: 1888–1901
- In commission: 1893–1923
- Completed: 6
- Lost: 1
- Scrapped: 4
- Preserved: 1

General characteristics
- Type: Protected cruiser
- Displacement: Normal: 2,245 to 2,689 long tons (2,281 to 2,732 t); Full load: 2,411 to 3,110 long tons (2,450 to 3,160 t)
- Length: 84.8 to 88.25 m (278 ft 3 in to 289 ft 6 in)
- Beam: 12.03 to 12.73 m (39 ft 6 in to 41 ft 9 in)
- Draft: 4.67 to 5.45 m (15 ft 4 in to 17 ft 11 in)
- Installed power: 4 × fire-tube boilers; 5,536 to 7,471 ihp (4,128 to 5,571 kW)
- Propulsion: 2 × screw propellers; 2 × triple-expansion steam engines
- Speed: 17.9 to 20 kn (33.2 to 37.0 km/h; 20.6 to 23.0 mph)
- Range: 2,100 nmi (3,900 km; 2,400 mi) at 10 kn (19 km/h; 12 mph)
- Complement: 213–278
- Armament: 4 × 15 cm (5.9 in) guns; 6 × 12 cm (4.7 in) guns; 1 × 75 mm (3 in) gun; 8 × 57 mm (2.24 in) guns; 2 × 37 mm (1.5 in) guns; 2 × 45 cm (17.7 in) torpedo tubes
- Armor: Deck: 25 to 50 mm (1 to 2 in); Conning tower: 50 mm

The Regioni class was a group of six protected cruisers built for the Italian Regia Marina (Royal Navy) in the late 1880s through the early 1900s. The class comprised Umbria, Lombardia, Etruria, Liguria, Elba, and Puglia, all of which were named for regions of Italy with the exception of Elba, which was named for the island. The class is sometimes referred as the Umbria class, for the first ship to be laid down. The ships, built by four different shipyards, varied slightly in their size, speed, and armament, but all could steam at about 18 knots (33 km/h; 21 mph) and their main armament consisted of four 15-centimeter (5.9 in) guns and six 12 cm (4.7 in) guns.

The ships served in a variety of roles throughout their careers, including scouts for the main fleet, colonial cruisers, and representatives of Italy at major foreign events. Elba observed the Russo-Japanese War, including the Battle of Chemulpo Bay in 1904, where she picked up Russian survivors. Lombardia was converted into a depot ship for submarines in 1906. Elba and Liguria were equipped with observation balloons in 1907–1908. In 1910, Umbria was sold to Haiti and renamed Consul Gostrück, though she quickly sank under the care of her inexperienced crew. The remaining ships, except for Lombardia, took part in the Italo-Turkish War in 1911–1912, where they provided gunfire support to Italian troops, bombarded Ottoman ports, and instituted a blockade in the Red Sea.

By World War I, most of the ships had been withdrawn to secondary roles, with Elba having been converted into a seaplane tender. Puglia was the only member of the class to take an active role, based out of Durazzo. Etruria was deliberately blown up by the Regia Marina as a deception operation against Austria-Hungary. The remaining ships were broken up for scrap in the early 1920s, though the bow section of Puglia was preserved at the Vittoriale degli italiani museum.

== Design ==
The design for the Regioni class, sometimes referred to as the Umbria class after the lead ship, was prepared by the naval architect Edoardo Masdea, and it was the first protected cruiser designed in Italy. All previous ships of the type had been designed in Britain, or in the case of the Etna class, enlarged copies of the British-designed Giovanni Bausan. As a first attempt, the ships of the Regioni class proved to be a disappointment, owing to their slow speed and insufficient armor protection.

=== General characteristics and machinery ===
Plan and profile drawing of the Regioni class

All six ships varied slightly in their dimensions. The ships were 80 to 83.2 meters (262 ft 6 in to 273 ft 0 in) long at the waterline and 88.25 m (289 ft 6 in) long overall. They had a beam of 12.03 to 12.72 m (39 ft 6 in to 41 ft 9 in) and a draft of 4.67 to 5.35 m (15 ft 4 in to 17 ft 7 in). The ships displaced 2,245 to 2,689 long tons (2,281 to 2,732 t) normally and 2,411 to 3,110 long tons (2,450 to 3,160 t) at full load. The ships were originally designed with a fore and aft sailing rig, though this was quickly removed. Instead, they were fitted with two pole masts equipped with spotting tops. They had a crew of between 213–278.

The first five ships' propulsion system consisted of a pair of horizontal triple-expansion steam engines, while Puglia was fitted with vertical triple-expansion machinery. The engines drove a pair of screw propellers. Steam was supplied by four cylindrical fire-tube boilers, which were vented into a pair of funnels on the centerline.

On her speed trials, Umbria reached a maximum of 19 knots (35 km/h; 22 mph) at 7,400 indicated horsepower (5,500 kW). Lombardia made 18.4 kn (34.1 km/h; 21.2 mph) at 6,010 ihp (4,480 kW), while Etruria reached 18.3 kn (33.9 km/h; 21.1 mph) at 7,018 ihp (5,233 kW). Liguria made 18.1 kn (33.5 km/h; 20.8 mph) at 5,536 ihp (4,128 kW) and Elba, the slowest member of the class, made 17.9 kn (33.2 km/h; 20.6 mph) at 7,471 ihp (5,571 kW) Puglia was by far the fastest, capable of steaming at a speed of 20 kn (37 km/h; 23 mph). The ships had a cruising radius of about 2,100 nautical miles (3,900 km; 2,400 mi) at a speed of 10 knots (19 km/h; 12 mph).

=== Armament and armor ===
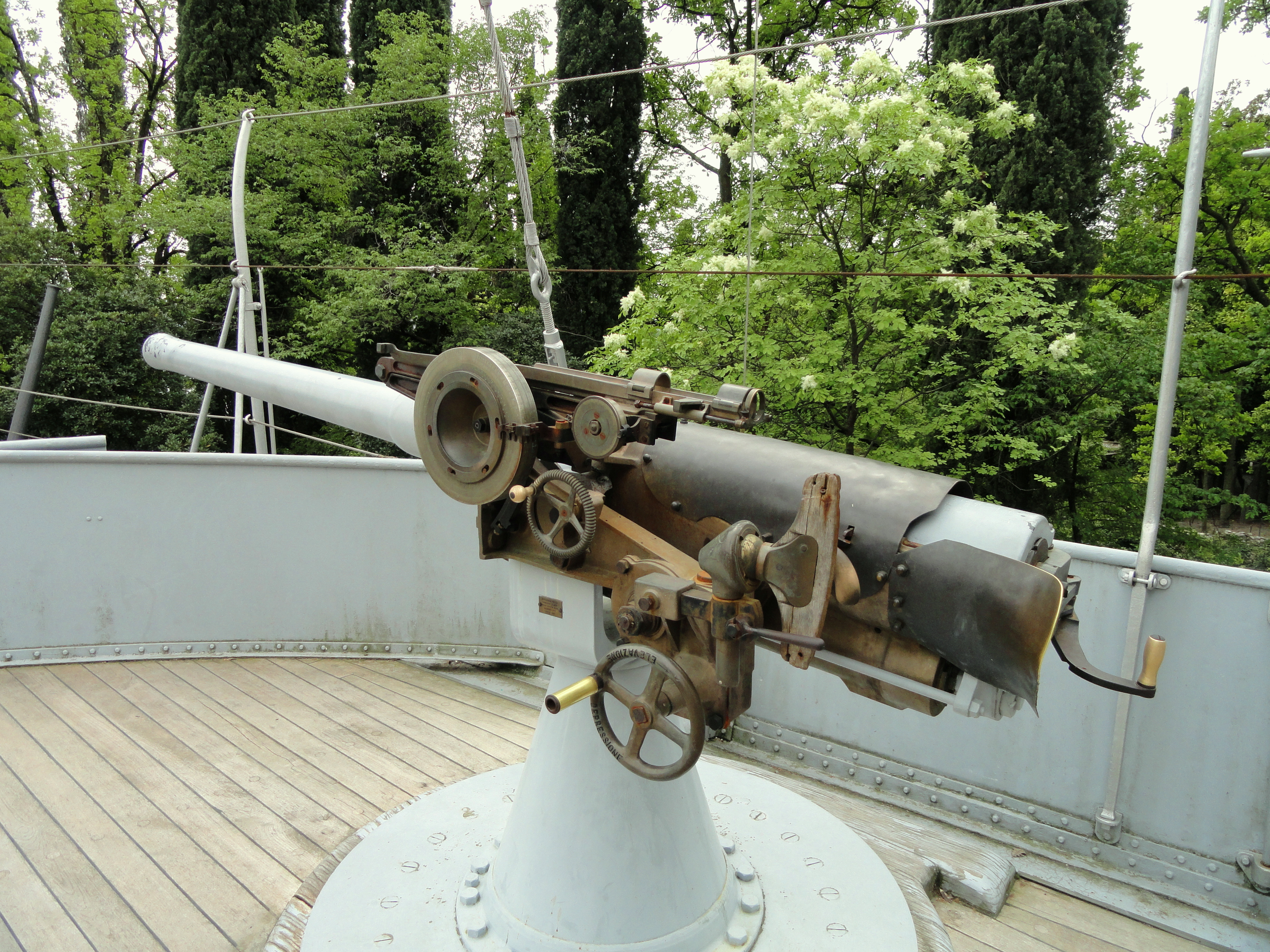
One of Puglia's light guns

All six ships were armed with a main battery of four 15 cm (5.9 in) L/40 guns mounted singly, with two side by side forward and two side by side aft. A secondary battery of six 12 cm (4.7 in) L/40 guns were placed between them, with three on each broadside. The ships' light armament varied. All of the ships save Lombardia were equipped with eight 57 mm (2.24 in) guns, which had an additional two of these guns. Umbria was also equipped with one 75 mm (3 in) gun and nine 37 mm (1.5 in) guns, while Puglia had eight of the 37 mm guns and Elba had six of them. Liguria and Etruria only had two 37 mm guns, and Lombardia had none. All six ships had a pair of machine guns and two 450 mm (17.7 in) torpedo tubes.

The ships all had their armament repeatedly revised throughout their careers. By 1905, each ship had had two of the 15 cm guns replaced with two additional 12 cm guns, and their secondary battery was standardized at eight 57 mm guns and eight 37 mm guns, with the exception of Puglia, which had six and two guns, respectively. Puglia had also had her two torpedo tubes removed by this point. In 1914, Liguria had all of her 15 cm guns removed, along with six of the 37 mm guns. Her armament was reduced further in 1917 when she was refitted as a minelayer; at this point, she mounted only six 12 cm guns and two 37 mm guns. Starting in 1915, Etruria and Lombardia were equipped with only six 12 cm guns, six 57 mm guns for Etruria and eight for Lombardia, two 37 mm guns, and their torpedo tubes. At the same time, Elba was rearmed with six 12 cm guns, two 37 cm guns, and one machine gun; she retained her torpedo tubes.

The first five ships were protected by a 50 mm (2 in) thick deck, which sloped downward at the sides of the hull to provide a measure of vertical protection against incoming fire. Their conning tower had 50 mm thick sides. Puglia had a deck that was only 25 mm (1 in) thick, though she had the same thickness of armor on her conning tower.

== Ships ==
Construction data
Name	Builder	Laid down	Launched	Completed
Umbria	Cantiere navale fratelli Orlando	1 August 1888	23 April 1891	16 February 1894
Lombardia	Regio Cantieri di Castellammare di Stabia	19 November 1889	12 July 1890	16 February 1893
Etruria	Cantiere navale fratelli Orlando	1 April 1889	23 April 1891	11 July 1894
Liguria	Ansaldo	1 July 1889	8 June 1893	1 December 1894
Elba	Regio Cantieri di Castellammare di Stabia	22 September 1890	12 August 1893	27 February 1896
Puglia	Arsenal of Taranto	October 1893	22 September 1898	26 May 1901

== Service history ==
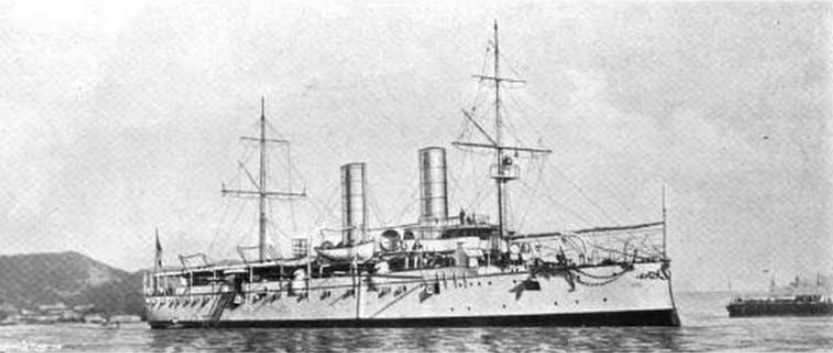
Elba c. 1899

The ships of the Regioni class served in a variety of roles throughout their careers. Their first decade in service was marked by frequent deployments abroad, interspersed between stints in the main Italian fleet, where they served as scouts for the battleships. In 1895, Etruria and much of the main fleet visited Germany for the opening ceremonies for the Kaiser Wilhelm Canal. Lombardia was stationed in South America in 1896, when an outbreak of yellow fever killed half of her crew while she was in Rio de Janeiro. In 1897, Umbria and Liguria were assigned to the Cruiser Squadron of the main fleet. Lombardia was deployed to China in 1901, where she replaced Elba, and to Italian Somaliland in 1903. There, she briefly skirmished with Somali rebels.

Elba was present in Korea during the Russo-Japanese War, which took place primarily in neighboring Manchuria. She witnessed the Battle of Chemulpo Bay in February 1904 and rescued Russian survivors along with British and French cruisers. In 1905, Umbria represented Italy at the Lewis and Clark Centennial Exposition in Portland, Oregon. Lombardia was converted into a depot ship for submarines in 1906–1908. Etruria visited the United States twice for major events, the Jamestown Exposition in 1907 and the Hudson–Fulton Celebration in 1909. Elba and Liguria were modified to operate an observation balloon to assist in spotting naval mines, which could be more easily seen from the air. In December 1910, Umbria was sold to the Haitian Navy and renamed Consul Gostrück, though she sank shortly after the transfer due to her new crew's inexperience. She was sold for scrap in 1913.

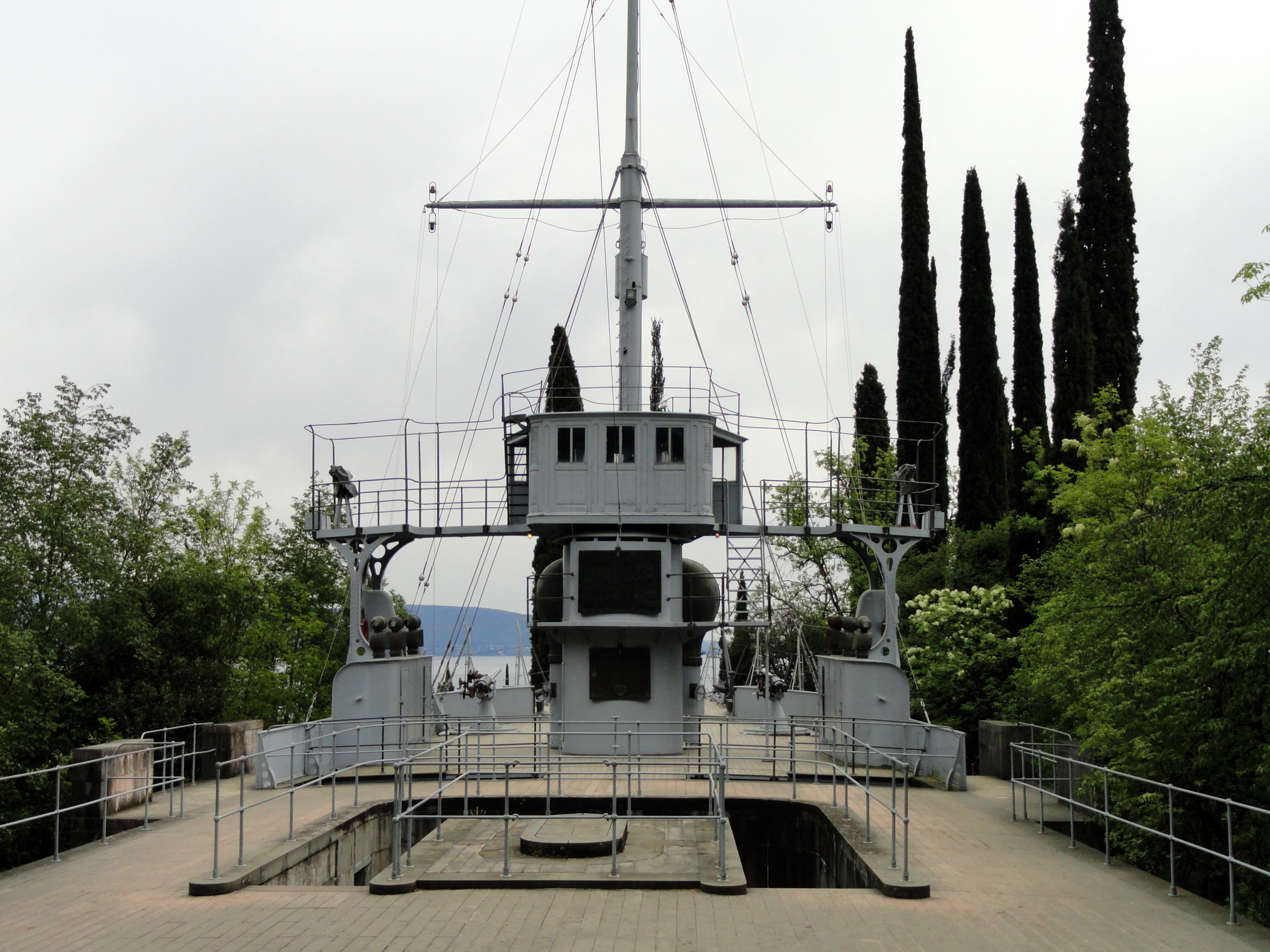
The bow of Puglia, preserved at the Vittoriale degli italiani museum

All of the remaining ships participated in the Italo-Turkish War of 1911–1912, with the exception of Lombardia which was stationed in the Adriatic. Etruria and Liguria took part in the assault on Benghazi and thereafter provided gunfire support to Italian forces in North Africa. Puglia was stationed in East Africa for the duration of the war, and frequently bombarded Ottoman ports. These included a diversionary attack that helped the cruiser Piemonte and two destroyers sink or force aground a flotilla of seven Ottoman gunboats in the Battle of Kunfuda Bay. In January 1912, Liguria and Elba joined the fleet in the Red Sea, where they imposed a blockade on Ottoman ports in the region, coupled with frequent bombardments of Ottoman positions.

In 1914 Elba was converted into the first dedicated seaplane tender in the Italian fleet. She was nevertheless too small to be of real use, and she remained in service for only two years. Puglia was the only ship of the class to take an active role in the First World War; in 1915, while patrolling off Durazzo she briefly encountered the Austro-Hungarian cruiser SMS Novara, which retreated before either ship could open fire. She covered the withdrawal of elements of the Serbian Army from Durazzo and shelled the pursuing Austro-Hungarian Army. Etruria was deliberately blown up in Livorno on 13 August 1918 to fool Austria-Hungary into believing its espionage network, which had been thoroughly compromised, was still operational.

After the war, the surviving ships discarded as the navy reduced its strength to peacetime levels. Elba was sold for scrapping in January 1920, followed by her sister Lombardia in July. That month, Puglia became involved in the civil unrest in Split, and the ship's captain and another sailor were murdered by a group of Croat nationalists. Liguria was sold in May 1921 and broken up. The Navy sold 'Puglia in March 1923, but while she was being dismantled Benito Mussolini donated her bow section to the Vittoriale degli italiani museum.
