= Piamonte (disambiguation) =

Piamonte may refer to:

- Piamonte, town and municipality in the Cauca Department, Colombia
- Alberto Jover Piamonte, Roman Catholic Archbishop of Jaro in the Philippines
- Giovanni di Piamonte, 15th-century Italian painter

== See also ==
- Piemonte (disambiguation)
- Piemont (disambiguation)
