= Piedmont Council =

Piedmont Council may refer to:

- Piedmont Council (California)
- Piedmont Council (North Carolina)

== See also ==
- Piedmont (disambiguation)
