= Italian cruiser Etruria =

Protected cruiser of the Italian Royal Navy

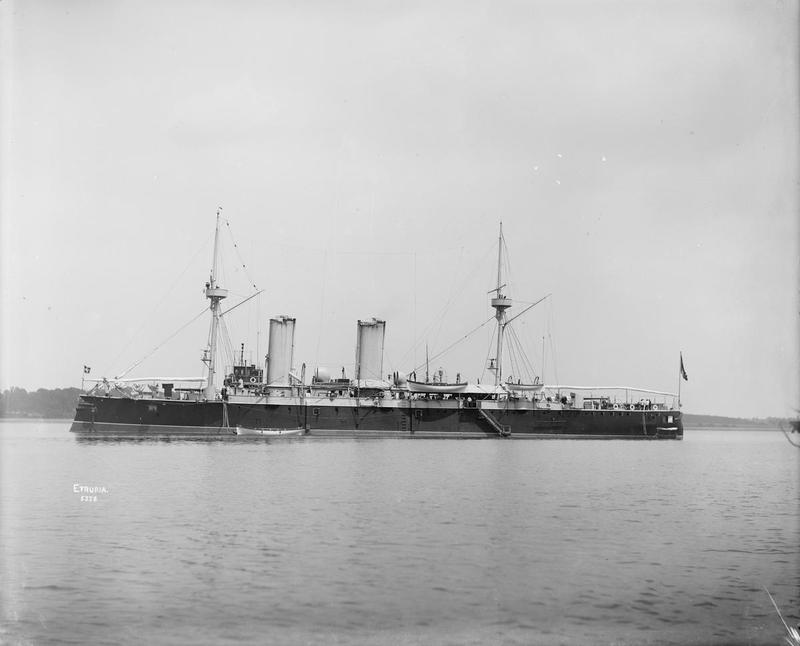
- Etruria in 1895

History

Italy
- Name: Etruria
- Namesake: Region of Etruria
- Builder: Cantiere navale fratelli Orlando, Livorno
- Laid down: 1 April 1889
- Launched: 23 April 1891
- Commissioned: 11 July 1894
- Fate: Sunk, 13 August 1918

General characteristics
- Class & type: Regioni-class cruiser
- Displacement: Normal: 2,245 to 2,689 long tons (2,281 to 2,732 t); Full load: 2,411 to 3,110 long tons (2,450 to 3,160 t)
- Length: 84.8 m (278 ft 3 in)
- Beam: 12.03 m (39 ft 6 in)
- Draft: 4.87 m (16 ft 0 in)
- Installed power: 4 × fire-tube boilers; 5,536 ihp (4,128 kW)
- Propulsion: 2 × screw propellers; 2 × triple-expansion steam engines
- Speed: 18.3 knots (33.9 km/h; 21.1 mph)
- Range: 2,100 nmi (3,900 km; 2,400 mi) at 10 knots (19 km/h; 12 mph)
- Complement: 213–278
- Armament: 4 × 15 cm (5.9 in) guns; 6 × 12 cm (4.7 in) guns; 8 × 57 mm (2.24 in) guns; 2 × 37 mm (1.5 in) guns; 2 × 450 mm (17.7 in) torpedo tubes
- Armor: Deck: 50 mm (2 in); Conning tower: 50 mm

Etruria was a protected cruiser of the Italian Regia Marina (Royal Navy) built in the 1891 by the Cantiere navale fratelli Orlando shipyard of Livorno. She was the third of six vessels of the Regioni class, all of which were named for current, or in the case of Etruria, former regions of Italy. The ship was equipped with a main armament of four 15 cm (5.9 in) and six 12 cm (4.7 in) guns, and she could steam at a speed of 18 knots (33 km/h; 21 mph).

Etruria spent her early career with the main fleet in the Mediterranean Sea. In the early 1900s, she spent much of her time in North and South American waters; she visited the United States for the Jamestown Exposition and the Hudson–Fulton Celebration in 1907 and 1909. The ship took part in the Italo-Turkish War of 1911–1912, primarily by providing gunfire support to Italian troops in North Africa. Reduced to a training ship by World War I, Etruria was deliberately sunk by the Regia Marina in Livorno to convince Austria-Hungary that its espionage network had not been compromised by double agents.

== Design ==
Plan and profile drawing of the Regioni class

Etruria was 84.8 meters (278 ft 3 in) long overall, had a beam of 12.03 m (39 ft 6 in) and a draft of 4.87 m (16 ft 0 in). Specific displacement figures have not survived for individual members of the class, but they displaced 2,245 to 2,689 long tons (2,281 to 2,732 t) normally and 2,411 to 3,110 long tons (2,450 to 3,160 t) at full load. The ships had a ram bow and a flush deck. Each vessel was fitted with a pair of pole masts. She had a crew of between 213 and 278.

Her propulsion system consisted of a pair of horizontal triple-expansion steam engines that drove two screw propellers. Steam was supplied by four cylindrical fire-tube boilers that were vented into two funnels. On her speed trials, she reached a maximum of 18.3 knots (33.9 km/h; 21.1 mph) at 7,018 indicated horsepower (5,233 kW). The ship had a cruising radius of about 2,100 nautical miles (3,900 km; 2,400 mi) at a speed of 10 knots (19 km/h; 12 mph).

Etruria was armed with a main battery of four 15 cm (5.9 in) L/40 guns mounted singly, with two side by side forward and two side by side aft. A secondary battery of six 12 cm (4.7 in) L/40 guns were placed between them, with three on each broadside. Close-range defense against torpedo boats consisted of eight 57 mm (2.24 in) guns two 37 mm (1.5 in) guns, and a pair of machine guns. She was also equipped with two 450 mm (17.7 in) torpedo tubes. Etruria was protected by a 50 mm (2 in) thick deck, and her conning tower had 50 mm thick sides.

== Service history ==
Etruria was laid down at the Cantiere navale fratelli Orlando shipyard in Livorno on 1 April 1889. Shortages of funding slowed the completion Etruria and her sister ships. Tight budgets forced the navy to reduce the pace of construction so that the funds could be used to keep the active fleet in service. As a result, it took two years to complete her hull, which was launched on 23 April 1891. Fitting-out work proceeded even more slowly; she was not ready for commissioning until 11 July 1894. Following her commissioning, Etruria was assigned to the Second Division of the Italian fleet in October 1894, along with the ironclad battleships Francesco Morosini, two cruisers and six torpedo boats. In 1895, she and the other ships were replaced by the ironclads Sardegna and Ruggiero di Lauria and the torpedo cruiser Partenope. On 20 June 1895, Etruria and a fleet that included the battleships Sardegna, Re Umberto, Andrea Doria, and Ruggiero di Lauria, visited Germany for the ceremony of the opening of the Kaiser Wilhelm Canal. Contingents from Britain, France, Russia, Spain, and several other countries joined the celebration. On the way back to Italy, the Italian squadron stopped to visit Spithead in the United Kingdom in July.

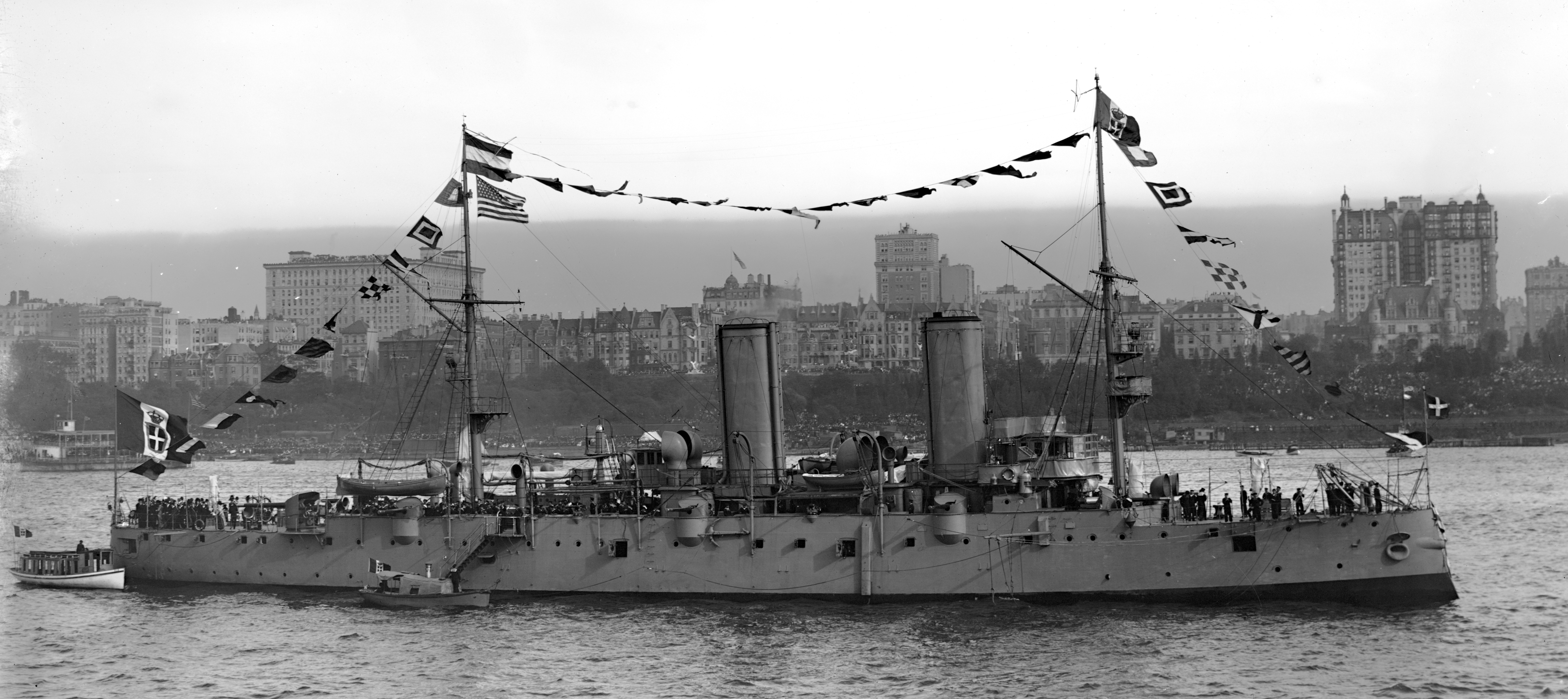
Etruria during the Hudson–Fulton Celebration in 1909

Etruria was stationed in the Red Sea to support colonial forces in Italian Eritrea in 1902. In April 1907, Etruria and the armored cruiser Varese crossed the Atlantic to represent Italy during the Jamestown Exposition, the commemoration of the 300th anniversary of the Jamestown colony, the first permanent English settlement in the Americas. In addition to the Austro-Hungarian delegation, the international fleet consisted of warships from Great Britain, Japan, Germany, Austria-Hungary, and several other nations. Etruria returned to the United States in September 1909 for the Hudson–Fulton Celebration in New York City, which also included ships from the German, British, and French fleets, among others, in addition to the hosting US Navy. On this occasion, she was joined by the training cruiser Etna.

Etruria also represented Italy at the commemoration of Peruvian pilot Jorge Chávez on 27 October 1910, who had been killed in a crash attempting to cross the Alps from France to Italy a month before. The French cruiser Montcalm joined Etruria for the event. The ship made another visit to the United States in March 1911, this time in San Francisco. Her visit coincided with the 50th anniversary of the proclamation of the Kingdom of Italy on 17 March; Etruria fired a 21-gun salute in honor of the anniversary, which was returned by the US Navy training facility in the harbor.

On 29 September 1911, Italy declared war on the Ottoman Empire in order to seize Libya. At the time, Etruria was still in American waters, but she was quickly recalled. On 18 October, she joined the escort for a troop convoy headed to Benghazi. The convoy was heavily protected against a possible Ottoman attack: the escort comprised the four Regina Elena-class pre-dreadnought battleships, her sister Liguria and another cruiser, and five destroyers. The Italian fleet bombarded the city the next morning after the Ottoman garrison refused to surrender. During the bombardment, parties from the ships and the infantry from the troopships went ashore. The Italians quickly forced the Ottomans to withdraw into the city by evening. After a short siege, the Ottoman forces withdrew on 29 October, leaving the city to the Italians.

By December, Etruria had been moved to Tobruk, where she provided gunfire support to the Italians defending the city. She was joined there by Etna and twelve torpedo boats. In the meantime, most of the fleet had returned to Italy for refitting. In January 1912, Etruria was moved back to Benghazi. For the next six months she remained here, supporting the garrison against Ottoman counter-attacks. The ship repeatedly shelled the Ottoman camps outside the city. On 15 October, the Ottomans surrendered, ending the war.

Etruria was stationed in Libya as part of the local defense force, which included the old ironclad battleships Lepanto and Enrico Dandolo, along with several smaller vessels. By the outbreak of World War I, the ship had been reduced to a training cruiser. The Italian Navy deliberately blew up Etruria in Livorno on 13 August 1918, ostensibly as an act of sabotage by Austro-Hungarian agents in Italy. The purported agents had in fact been coopted as double agents, and the destruction of Etruria was meant to strengthen Austro-Hungarian confidence in their espionage network.
