= Piemont =

Piemont may refer to:

- Piemont or Piedmont, a region of Italy
- Piemont-Liguria Ocean, a former piece of oceanic crust that is seen as part of the Tethys Ocean
- Nicolaas Piemont(1644–1709), Dutch Golden Age landscape painter

== See also ==
- Piemonte (disambiguation)
- Piedmont (disambiguation)
