= Italian cruiser Elba =

Protected cruiser of the Italian Royal Navy

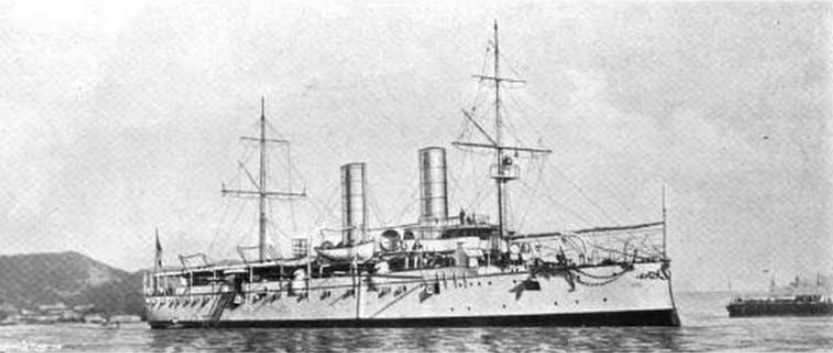
- Elba, c. 1899

History

Italy
- Name: Elba
- Namesake: Island of Elba
- Builder: Regio Cantiere di Castellammare di Stabia
- Laid down: 22 September 1890
- Launched: 12 August 1893
- Commissioned: 27 February 1896
- Fate: Sold for scrap, 5 January 1920

General characteristics
- Class & type: Regioni-class cruiser
- Displacement: Normal: 2,245 to 2,689 long tons (2,281 to 2,732 t); Full load: 2,411 to 3,110 long tons (2,450 to 3,160 t)
- Length: 88.2 m (289 ft 4 in)
- Beam: 12.72 m (41 ft 9 in)
- Draft: 4.86 m (15 ft 11 in)
- Installed power: 4 × fire-tube boilers; 7,471 ihp (5,571 kW)
- Propulsion: 2 × screw propellers; 2 × triple-expansion steam engines
- Speed: 17.9 knots (33.2 km/h; 20.6 mph)
- Range: 2,100 nmi (3,900 km; 2,400 mi) at 10 knots (19 km/h; 12 mph)
- Complement: 213–278
- Armament: 4 × 15 cm (5.9 in) guns; 6 × 12 cm (4.7 in) guns; 8 × 57 mm (2.24 in) guns; 6 × 37 mm (1.5 in) guns; 2 × 450 mm (17.7 in) torpedo tubes
- Armor: Deck: 50 mm (2 in); Conning tower: 50 mm

Elba was a protected cruiser of the Italian Regia Marina (Royal Navy). She was the fifth of six Regioni-class ships, all of which were named for regions of Italy, with the exception of Elba, which was named for the island. Elba was built by the Regio Cantieri di Castellammare di Stabia shipyard; her keel was laid in September 1890, she was launched in August 1893, and she was commissioned in February 1896. The ship was equipped with a main armament of four 15 cm (5.9 in) and six 12 cm (4.7 in) guns, and she could steam at a speed of nearly 18 knots (33 km/h; 21 mph).

Elba spent much of her career abroad. She participated in the blockade of Venezuela during the Venezuelan crisis of 1902–1903 and was present in East Asia during the Russo-Japanese War in 1904–1905. In February 1904, her crew witnessed the Battle of Chemulpo Bay between Japanese and Russian warships; after the battle ended in Russian defeat, Elba and British and French cruisers picked up survivors. She took part in the Italo-Turkish War in 1911–1912 but saw no action, being used primarily to blockade Turkish ports in the Red Sea. In 1914, Elba was converted into the first seaplane tender of the Regia Marina, with equipment to handle three seaplanes. This service did not last long, however, as she was too small and too old. Decommissioned by 1916, the old warship was sold for scrap in January 1920 and broken up.

== Design ==
Plan and profile drawing of the Regioni class

Elba was slightly larger than her sister ships. She was 88.2 meters (289 ft 4 in) long overall and had a beam of 12.72 m (41 ft 9 in) and a draft of 4.86 m (15 ft 11 in). Specific displacement figures have not survived for individual members of the class, but they displaced 2,245 to 2,689 long tons (2,281 to 2,732 t) normally and 2,411 to 3,110 long tons (2,450 to 3,160 t) at full load. The ships had a ram bow and a flush deck. Unlike her sisters, she had a copper-sheathed hull, which reduced fouling during lengthy periods between dockyard maintenance. Each vessel was fitted with a pair of pole masts. She had a crew of between 213 and 278.

Her propulsion system consisted of a pair of horizontal triple-expansion steam engines that drove two screw propellers. Steam was supplied by four cylindrical fire-tube boilers that were vented into two funnels. On her speed trials, she reached a maximum of 17.9 knots (33.2 km/h; 20.6 mph) at 7,471 indicated horsepower (5,571 kW). The ship had a cruising radius of about 2,100 nautical miles (3,900 km; 2,400 mi) at a speed of 10 knots (19 km/h; 12 mph). Also unlike her sisters, she had a copper-sheathed hull, which reduced fouling during lengthy periods between dockyard maintenance.

Elba was armed with a main battery of four 15 cm (5.9 in) L/40 guns mounted singly, with two side by side forward and two side by side aft. A secondary battery of six 12 cm (4.7 in) L/40 guns were placed between them, with three on each broadside. Close-range defense against torpedo boats consisted of eight 57 mm (2.24 in) guns, six 37 mm (1.5 in) guns, and a pair of machine guns. She was also equipped with two 450 mm (17.7 in) torpedo tubes. Elba was protected by a 50 mm (2 in) thick deck, and her conning tower had 50 mm thick sides.

== Service history ==
The keel for Elba was laid down at the Regio Cantieri di Castellammare di Stabia in the eponymous city on 22 September 1890. Her completed hull was launched on 12 August 1893, and fitting-out work proceeded at a leisurely pace. Elba was finally ready for service on 27 February 1896. She thereafter joined the Flying Squadron, along with her sister Umbria, the armored cruiser Marco Polo, and the old screw corvette Amerigo Vespucci. In 1897, Elba was transferred to the Red Sea Squadron, along with the gunboats Volturno, Governolo, Andrea Provana, and Veniero, the screw corvette Volta, and the aviso Staffetta. Elba was stationed in East Asian waters in 1899, again in company with Marco Polo and Amerigo Vespucci. On 8 March 1899, the Italian Minister of Foreign Affairs, Vice Admiral Felice Napoleone Canevaro, ordered Elba and Marco Polo to occupy China′s Sanmen Bay in a botched attempt to force China to grant Italy a lease there similar to the lease the German Empire had secured in 1898 at Jiaozhou Bay. Canevaro then countermanded the order when he discovered that the United Kingdom would not support an Italian use of force.

Elba, c. 1903

In 1901, Elba was replaced by her sister ship Lombardia and returned to Italy. Elba was sent to Venezuelan waters in 1902 during the Venezuelan crisis of 1902–1903, when an international force of British, German, and Italian warships blockaded Venezuela over the country's refusal to pay foreign debts. Elba was joined by the protected cruiser Giovanni Bausan and the armored cruiser Carlo Alberto.

Elba was present, along with the British cruiser HMS Talbot, the French cruiser Pascal, and the United States' gunboat USS Vicksburg during the Battle of Chemulpo Bay on 9 February 1904 during the Russo-Japanese War. Elba, Talbot, and Pascal cleared for action in the event that the Japanese warships opened fire on them. After the battle ended in a Russian defeat, the three cruisers sent boats to pick up the survivors from the sinking cruiser Varyag and gunboat Korietz. Elba took off a total of 6 officers and 172 enlisted men from the two vessels, out of a total of 27 officers and 654 enlisted saved from the ships. Elba thereafter went to Seoul to protect the Italian embassy there. On 24 February, the cruiser Piemonte arrived to relieve Elba. The latter ship departed the following morning for Hong Kong, where she would deposit the Russian sailors. It was not until 10 March, however, that a French mail ship was available for Elba to discharge her passengers for their return trip to Europe.

Starting in October 1907, Elba was modified to handle a Draken observation balloon. The balloon was linked to the ship via a telephone line, and was used to spot naval mines, scout for the fleet, and to observe the fall of shot from the ships. This was the first time the Italian navy experimented with aircraft of any sort at sea. Initial tests were held off Calabria in company with Liguria, which was similarly modified. During the annual fleet maneuvers in 1908, Elba and her balloon were used to keep watch on the harbor entrance of Augusta, Sicily, which proved to be effective in alerting defenders to attacking warships.

By the outbreak of the Italo-Turkish War in September 1911, Elba had been stationed in Italy's East African colonies, Eritrea and Somaliland. The ship operated without her balloon, as the fleet relied solely on ground-based airships for the duration of the war. In January 1912, she and her sister Liguria escorted a pair of mail steamships to the Red Sea, where they were used to enforce the blockade of several Ottoman ports. Elba remained in the region for the remainder of the war, assisting in the blockade effort. Ottoman naval forces had already been defeated at the Battle of Kunfuda Bay, so there was no chance for Elba to see action. The Ottomans eventually agreed to surrender in October, ending the war.

=== Conversion to seaplane tender ===
Elba operated the observation balloon through 1913. The following year, she was modified to serve as a depot ship for three seaplanes, and she entered service in this new role on 4 June 1914. During this period she operated Nieuport IV seaplanes. The conversion, which was designed by Alessandro Guidoni, involved installing a 30 m (98 ft) platform on her fantail, an open hangar just aft of the funnels, and derricks to transfer aircraft between the ship and sea. The hangar was fitted with canvas tarps that could be closed to protect the aircraft therein. Her complement of aircraft consisted of three or four Curtiss Model H flying boats, and another aircraft or a Draken balloon could be kept on the platform aft. She was the first dedicated seaplane tender of the Italian navy, though seaplanes had already been operated aboard several battleships and cruisers.

Elba was stationed in Taranto in October, where she served with the main fleet. Following Italy's entry into World War I in May 1915, she used her aircraft to scout for the fleet, but with only a maximum of four aircraft, she could not provide continuous reconnaissance screening. In addition, she lacked sufficient space for aircraft fuel storage and workshops to repair the seaplanes, which hampered her ability to keep her limited number of aircraft operational. Like many of the other conversions of similar vessels in foreign navies, Elba was too small and too slow for her intended role, and she was retired in 1916; by this time, the more effective tender Europa had entered service. She remained in the Italian inventory until 4 January 1920, when she was sold for scrap.
