= Vittoriale degli Italiani =

Estate in Gardone Riviera, Lombardy, Italy

Coordinates: 45°37′26″N 10°33′54″E

Il Vittoriale degli Italiani
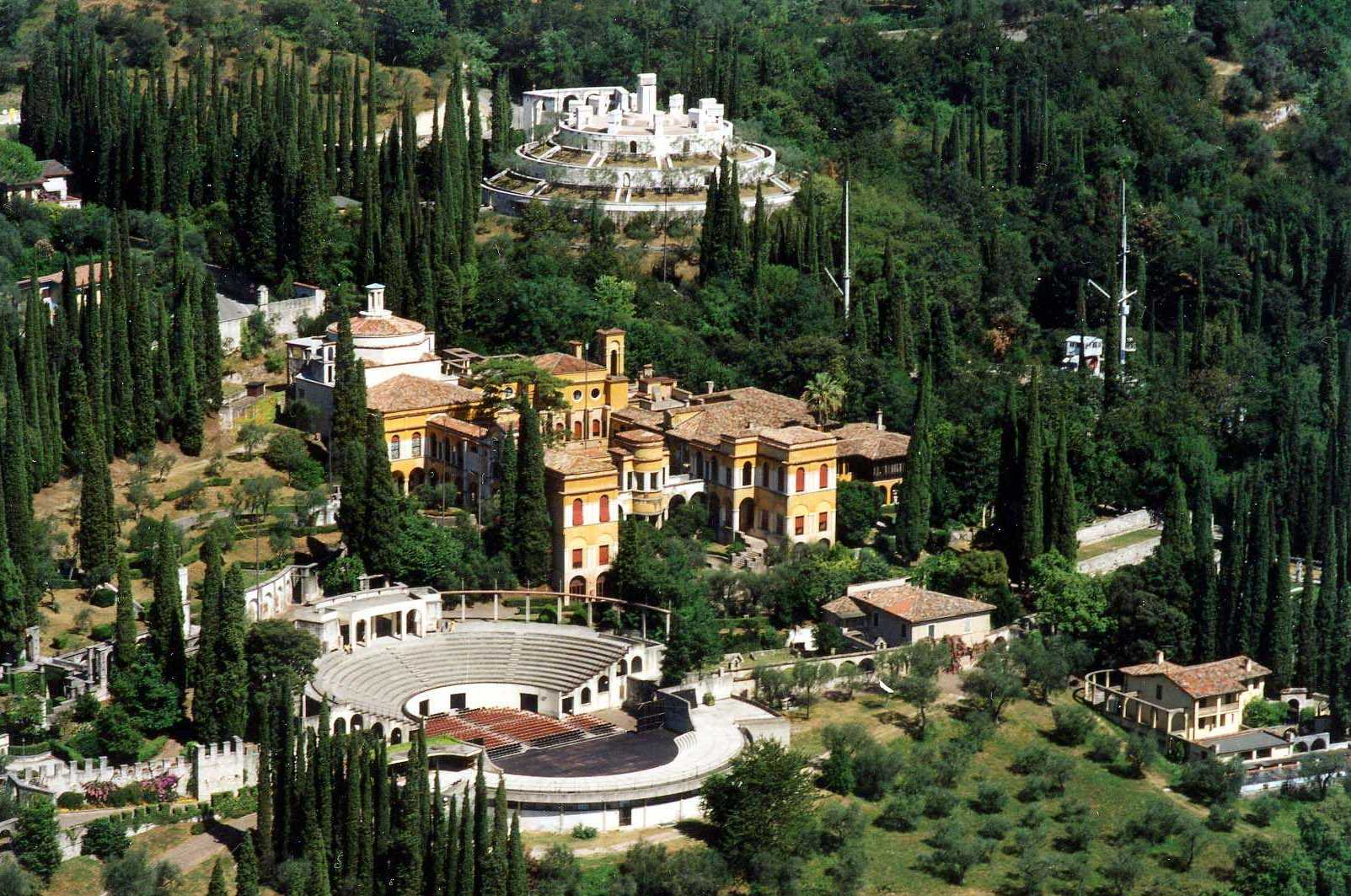

General information
- Architectural style: Elements of Italian Fascist Architecture
- Location: Gardone Riviera, Italy
- Construction started: 1921
- Completed: 1938

Design and construction
- Architect: Giancarlo Maroni

The Vittoriale degli Italiani (English translation: The shrine of victories of the Italians) is a hillside estate in the town of Gardone Riviera overlooking Lake Garda in province of Brescia, in Lombardy. It is where the Italian poet and novelist Gabriele D'Annunzio lived from 1922 until his death in 1938. The estate consists of the residence of D'Annunzio called the Prioria (priory), an amphitheatre, the protected cruiser Puglia set into a hillside, a boathouse containing the MAS vessel used by D'Annunzio in 1918 and a circular mausoleum. Its grounds are a member in the association Grandi Giardini Italiani.

References to the Vittoriale range from a "monumental citadel" to a "fascist lunapark", the site inevitably inheriting the controversy surrounding its creator.

== History ==
The house, Villa Cargnacco, had belonged to the German art historian of the Italian Renaissance Henry Thode, from whom it was confiscated by the Italian state, including artworks, a collection of books, and a piano which had belonged to Liszt. d'Annunzio rented it in February 1921 and within a year reconstruction started under the guidance of architect Giancarlo Maroni. Due to d'Annunzio's popularity and his disagreement with the fascist government on several issues, such as the alliance with Nazi Germany, the fascists did what they could to please d'Annunzio in order to keep him away from political life in Rome. Part of their strategy was to make huge funds available to expand the property, to construct and/or modify buildings, and to create the impressive art and literature collection. In 1924 the airplane that d'Annunzio used for his pamphleteering run over Vienna during World War I was brought to the estate, followed in 1925 by the MAS naval vessel used by him to taunt the Austrians in 1918 in the Beffa di Buccari. In the same year the bow section of the protected cruiser Puglia was hauled up the hill and placed in the woods behind the house, and the property was expanded by acquisition of surrounding lands and buildings.

In 1926 the government donated an amount of 10 million lire, which allowed a considerable enlargement of the Villa, with a new wing named the Schifamondo. In 1931 construction was started on the Parlaggio, the name for the amphitheatre. The mausoleum was designed after d'Annunzio's death but not actually built until 1955, and d'Annunzio's remains were finally brought there in 1963.

== Buildings ==
=== The Prioria ===
Prioria main entrance.

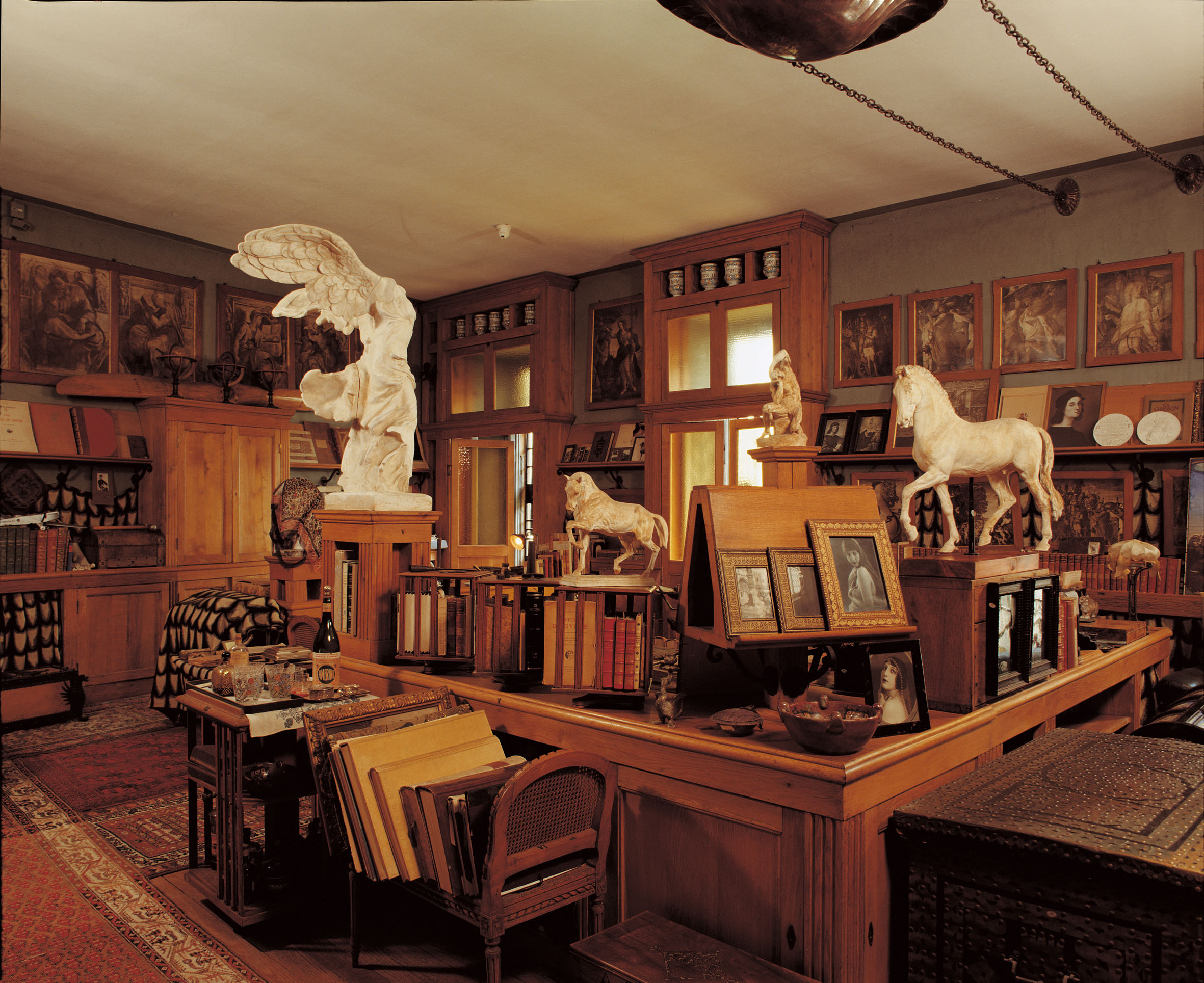
Room in Prioria.

The Prioria itself consists of a number of rooms opulently decorated and filled with memorabilia. Notable are the two waiting rooms, one for welcome guests, one for unwelcome ones. It is the latter where Benito Mussolini was sent to on his visit in 1925. A phrase was inscribed specifically for him above the mirror:

To the visitor:
Are you bringing with you Narcissus' Mirror?
This is leaded glass, my mask maker.
Feel free to adjust your masks to your face,
But remind yourself that you are glass against steel.

The leper's room is where D'Annunzio's wake was held upon his death. Its name comes from the fact that d'Annunzio felt that he was being spurned by the government due to their continued efforts to keep him in Gardone, rather than possibly in the limelight in Rome.

The Relic room holds a large collection of religious statues and images of different beliefs, purposely placed together to make a statement about the universal character of spirituality. The inscription on the inner wall reads:

As there are five fingers on a hand, there are only five mortal sins.

D'Annunzio wished to make clear hereby that he didn't believe that lust and greed should be considered sinful.

A most unlikely relic is the distorted steering wheel of racing speedboat Miss England II, donated after the coppa dell oltranza (unlimited cup) powerboating trophy, organized under d'Annunzio patronage, was held in 1931. Miss England II had crashed in a world speed record attempt, killing her pilot, Sir Henry Segrave in 1930 (though winning the record nevertheless) and was rebuilt to race and win at Lake Garda the following year with Kaye Don at the helm.

D'annunzio who was a syncretist deemed the distorted steering wheel "a relic of the religion of courage".

=== The amphitheatre ===
The amphitheatre is the first major structure one comes across after entering the estate and was clearly based upon classical models, the architect Maroni even visiting Pompeii for inspiration. Its location, like the other buildings of the Vittoriale, undeniably offers a majestic view of the Garda lake, it is still used for performances today.

=== The mausoleum ===
The circular structure is situated on the highest point on the estate. It contains the remains of men who served D'Annunzio and died during the Fiume period, and d'Annunzio himself.

=== The protected cruiser Puglia ===
Jutting out of one of the hilltops, the bow section of the cruiser Puglia makes a surreal sight. It was placed there pointing in the direction of the Adriatic, "ready to conquer the Dalmatian shores".

== Gallery ==
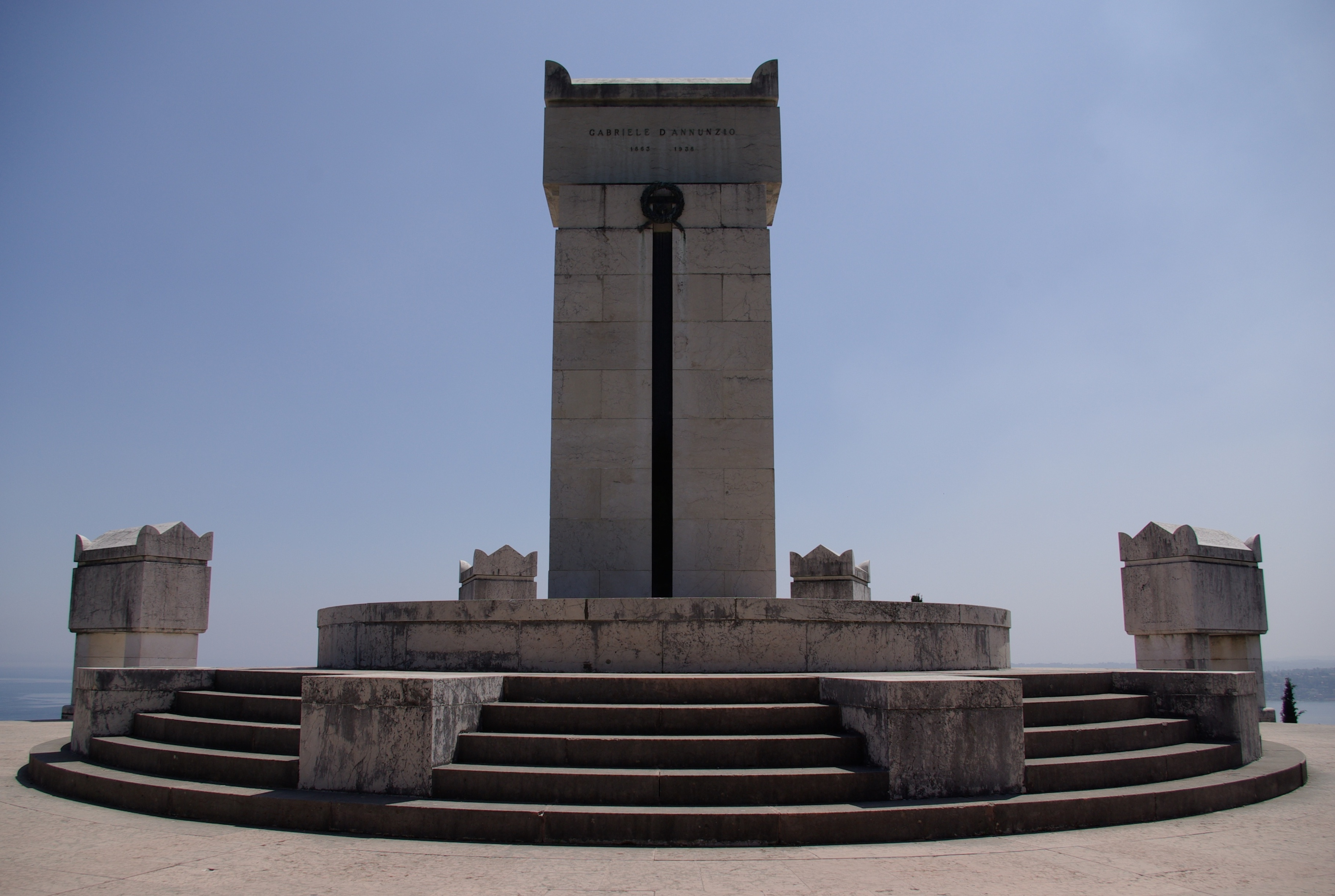
Mausoleum

Prioria

Amphitheatre

Pond of Dances

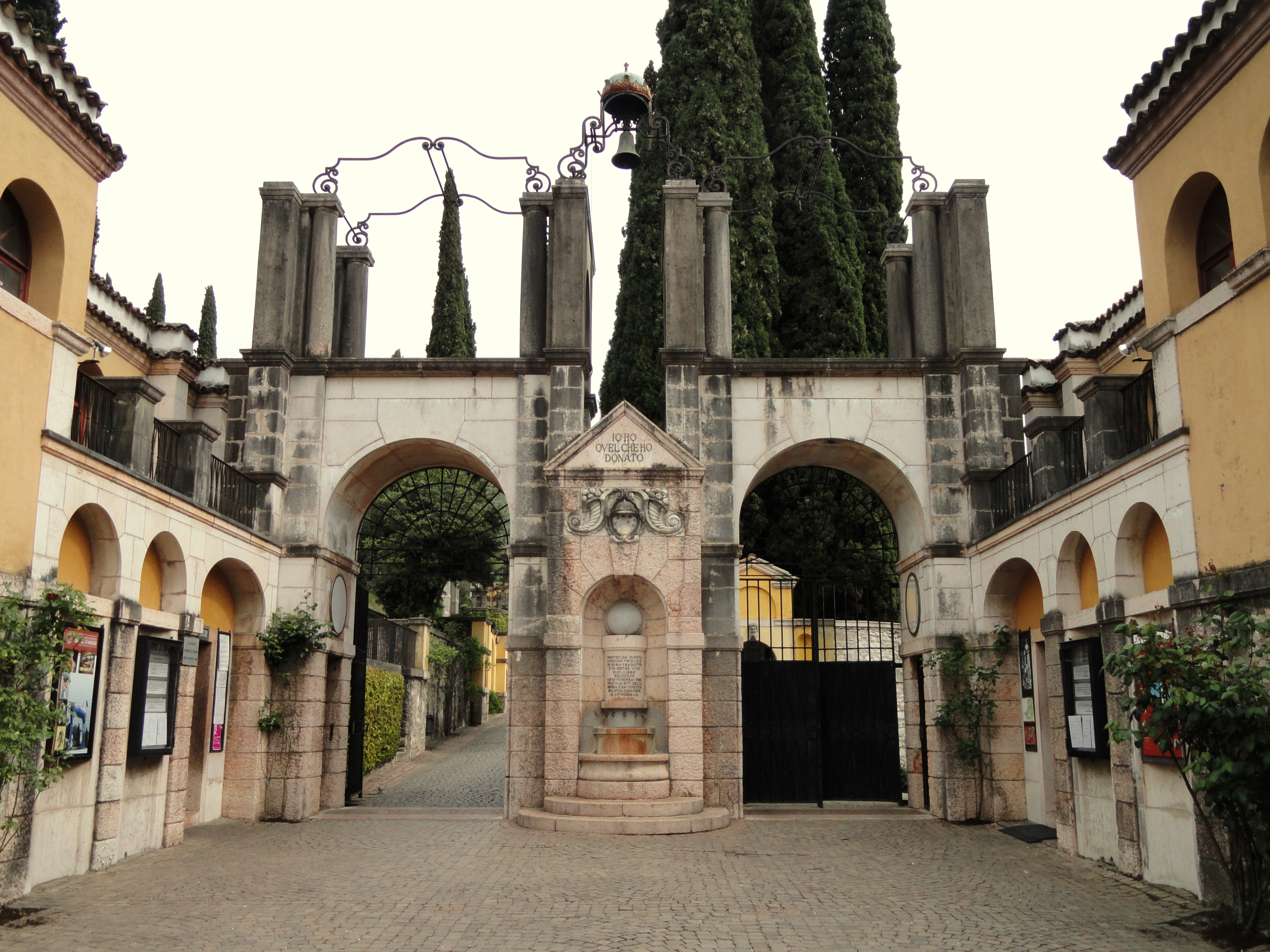
Entrance

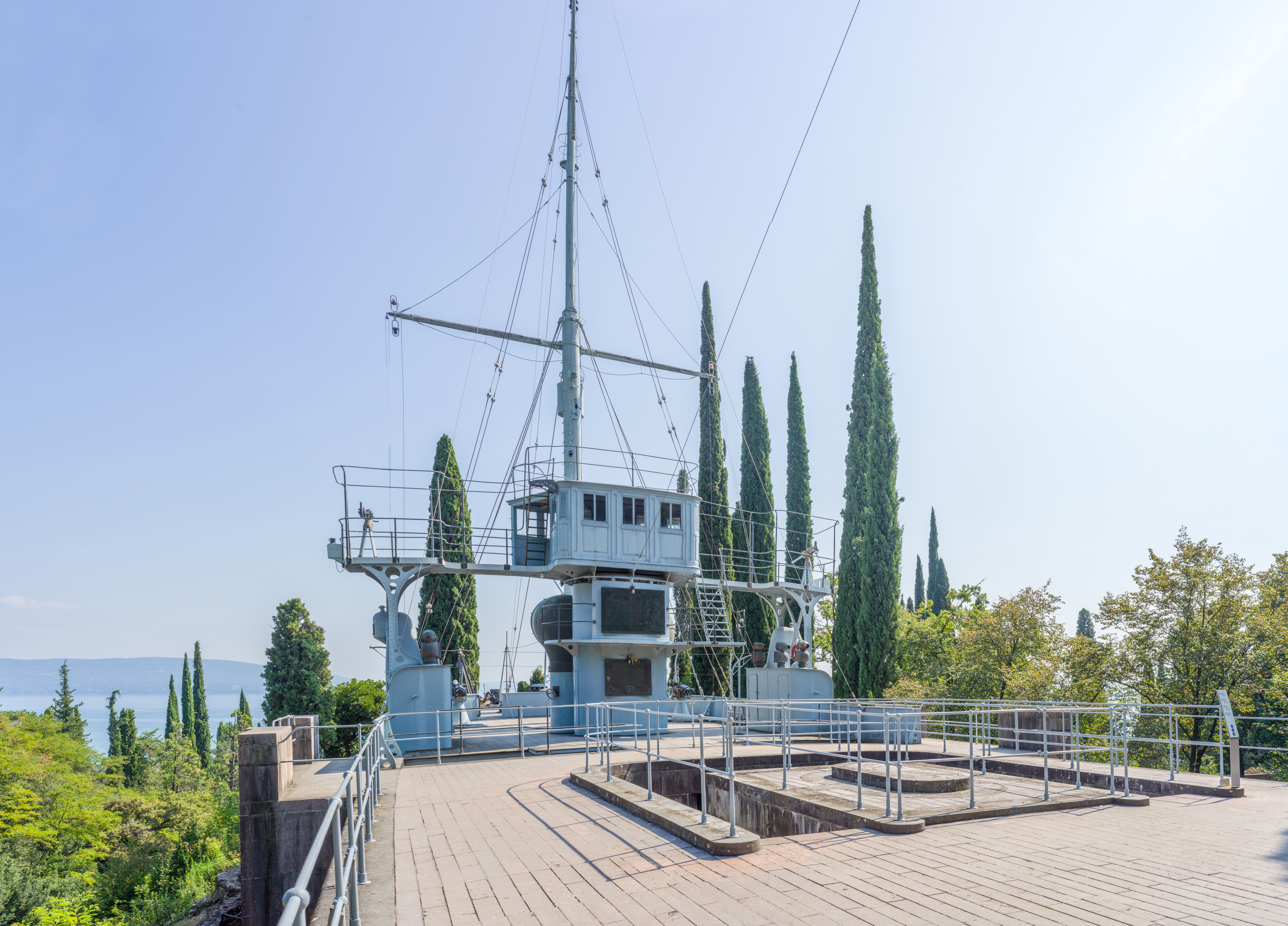
Cruiser Puglia

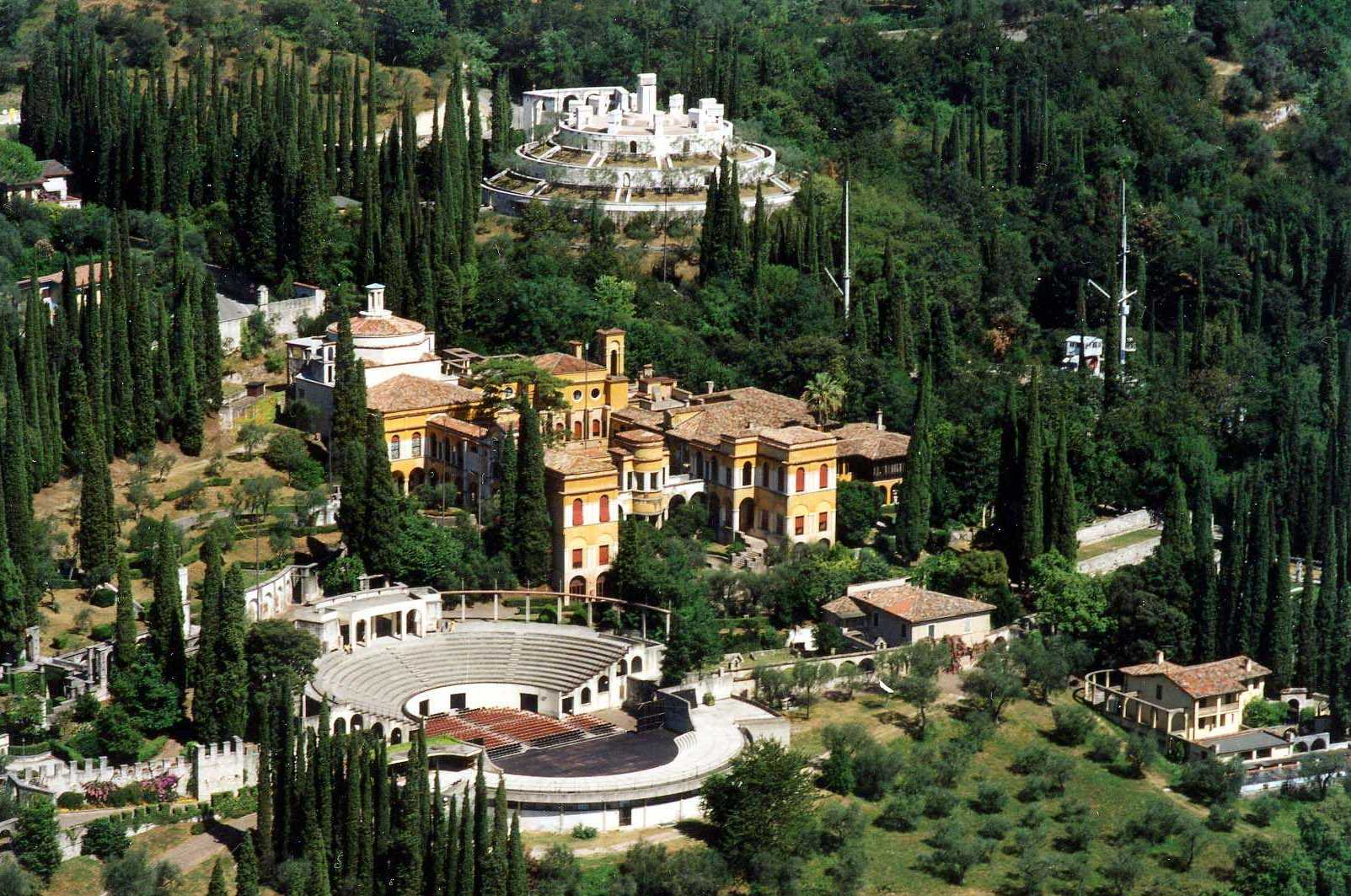
Panoramic view
