= Italian cruiser Piemonte =

Protected cruiser of the Italian Royal Navy

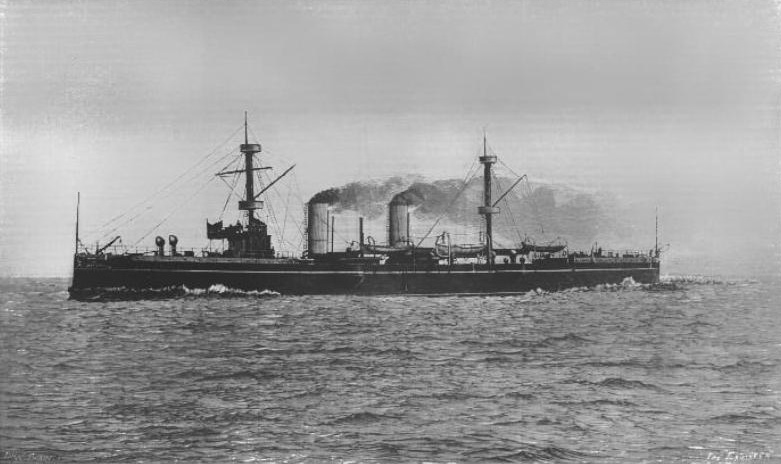
- Piemonte in 1889

Class overview
- Preceded by: Dogali
- Succeeded by: Regioni-class cruiser
- Completed: 1

History

Italy
- Name: Piemonte
- Builder: Armstrong Whitworth
- Laid down: 1887
- Launched: 23 August 1888
- Completed: 8 August 1889
- Acquired: 30 July 1888
- Stricken: 15 May 1920
- Fate: Broken up, 1920

General characteristics
- Type: Protected cruiser
- Displacement: 2,473 long tons (2,513 t)
- Length: 310 ft (94.5 m) (p/p)
- Beam: 38 ft (11.6 m)
- Draft: 15 ft (4.6 m)
- Installed power: 12,000 ihp (8,900 kW); 4 × Scotch marine boilers
- Propulsion: 2 × screw propellers; 2 × triple-expansion steam engines
- Speed: 22 knots (41 km/h; 25 mph)
- Range: 7,000 nautical miles (13,000 km; 8,100 mi) at 10 knots (19 km/h; 12 mph)
- Complement: 12 officers; 245 men
- Armament: 6 × 6-inch (15 cm)/40 guns; 6 × 4.7-inch (12 cm)/40 guns; 10 × 6-pounder Hotchkiss guns; 6 × 1-pounder Hotchkiss guns; 3 × 14-inch (356 mm) torpedo tubes
- Armor: Deck: 1–3 in (25–76 mm); Conning tower: 3 in (76 mm); Gun shields: 4.5 in (114 mm)

Piemonte was a unique protected cruiser built for the Italian Regia Marina (Royal Navy) in the 1880s by the British shipyard Armstrong Whitworth. She was the first major warship armed entirely with quick-firing (QF) guns and she was also the fastest cruiser in the world upon her completion in 1889. Piemonte was frequently deployed overseas, including a lengthy tour in East Asian waters from 1901 to 1904. She saw significant action during the Italo-Turkish War in 1911–1912 in the Red Sea, where she frequently bombarded Ottoman ports. During the Battle of Kunfuda Bay in January 1912, she and two destroyers sank four Ottoman gunboats and forced ashore three more. Piemonte participated in World War I but she saw little action during the conflict. She remained in service until 1920, when she was scrapped.

== Design ==
The first design by the newly hired naval architect Philips Watts for Armstrong Whitworth, Piemonte was designed as an improved version of the Italian cruiser Dogali. The ship was built as a speculative venture and was purchased by Italy on 30 July 1888 for delivery in six months. Her intended armament consisted of two 8-inch (203 mm) and four 6-inch (152 mm) guns, all breech-loading weapons, but the Italians insisted that she be equipped with six 6-inch QF guns. The changes to the magazines and the addition of large sponsons to accommodate the QF guns significantly delayed her completion. Piemonte was the first major warship to be armed with medium-caliber, quick-firing guns; these weapons would become the standard armament for cruisers in the 1890s.

=== General characteristics ===
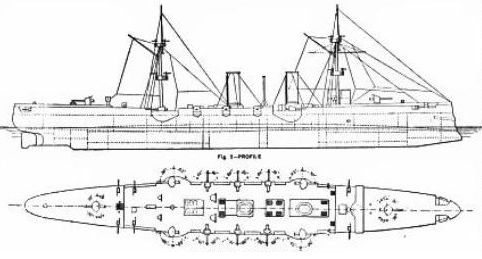
Line-drawing of Piemonte

Piemonte was 310 feet (94.5 m) between perpendiculars, with a beam of 38 feet (11.6 m). She had a mean draft of 15 feet (4.6 m) and displaced 2,473 long tons (2,513 t). The ship had a crew of 12 officers and 245 enlisted crew. Piemonte was fitted with two heavy military masts and had a partial double bottom. The large sponsons extended down to within about a foot (305 mm) of the water and proved to be very wet in service. She proved to be rather overgunned for her size and her freeboard was only 8 feet 3 inches (2.51 m) at normal load and 6 feet 9 inches (2.06 m) at deep load.

The ship was powered by two 4-cylinder Humphrys, Tennant vertical triple-expansion steam engines, each driving one propeller shaft. The stroke of her engines was 27 inches (690 mm) and the bores of their cylinders were 36 inches (910 mm), 55 inches (1,400 mm) and 60 inches (1,500 mm). The low-pressure cylinder of Piemonte' engines was split in two for smoother running and she was the first warship thus equipped. Steam for the engines was supplied by four double-ended Scotch marine boilers at a pressure of 155 psi (1,069 kPa; 11 kgf/cm^{2}) and their exhausts were trunked into a pair of funnels amidships. Designed for a maximum output of 12,000 indicated horsepower (8,900 kW), her engines produced 7,040 ihp (5,250 kW), using natural draught, and gave the ship a speed of 20.4 knots (37.8 km/h; 23.5 mph) during her sea trials in May 1889. Using forced draught increased her engine output to 12,600 ihp (9,400 kW) and her speed to 22.3 knots (41.3 km/h; 25.7 mph). This made her the fastest cruiser in the world. The ship normally embarked a total of 200 long tons (203 t) of coal, but could carry a maximum of 600 long tons (610 t). Piemonte had a cruising radius of about 7,000 nautical miles (13,000 km; 8,100 mi) at a speed of 10 knots (19 km/h; 12 mph). At full speed, she could steam for 1,950 nmi (3,610 km; 2,240 mi).

=== Armament ===
Piemonte was armed with a main battery of six 6-inch L/40 guns in single mounts. (Note: L/40 refers to the length of the gun in terms of caliber.) One gun was placed forward and one aft, with two on each broadside abreast of the masts. These guns were mounted in sponsons to allow direct ahead and astern firing. They were supported by a secondary battery of six 4.7-inch (120 mm) L/40 guns in single mounts, three on each side between the 15 cm guns. Light weapons included ten 57-millimeter (2.24 in) 6-pounder Hotchkiss L/40 guns, six 37-millimeter (1.5 in) 1-pounder Hotchkiss L/20 guns, and four 10 mm (0.39 in) Maxim machine guns. Four of 1-pounder and all of the machine guns were mounted in the military masts. She was also equipped with 14-inch (356 mm) torpedo tubes. One was mounted in the bow and the other two were on the broadside in rotating mounts, all above water.

Armor protection consisted of a sloped deck that ranged in thickness from 1 inch (25 mm) on the flat and 2–3 inches (51–76 mm) on the slopes. The armor protecting her conning tower consisted of three inches of steel plating. The guns of her main and secondary armament were protected by gun shields 4.5 inches (110 mm) thick.

== Service history ==
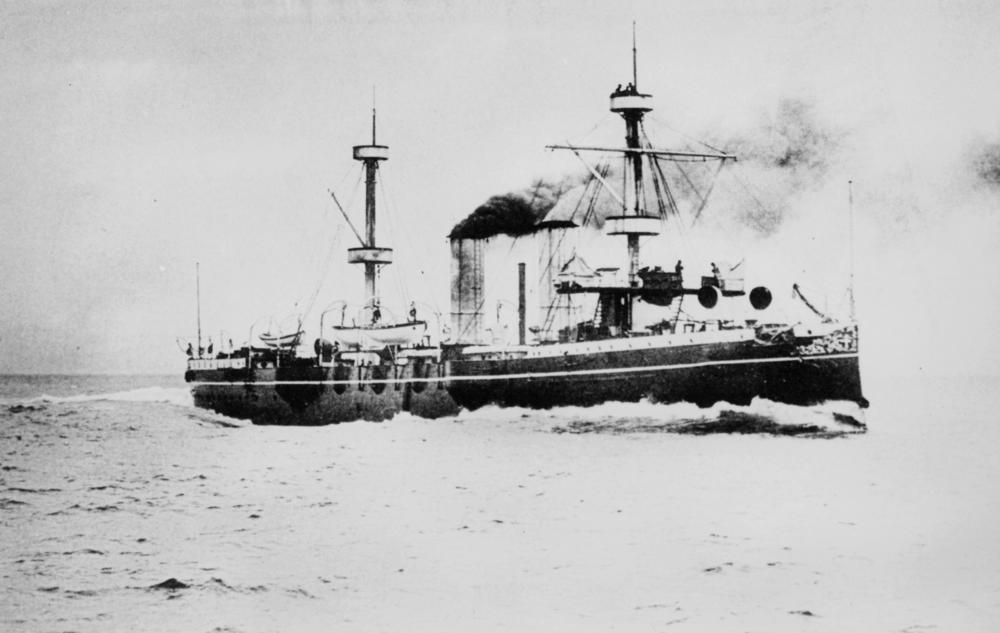
Piemonte steaming at high speed in her original configuration

Piemonte was built by the British shipyard Armstrong Whitworth in Elswick. Her keel was laid down in 1887 and she was launched on 23 August 1888. After completing fitting-out work, the new cruiser was completed on 8 September 1889 and delivered to the Regia Marina. In 1890, Piemonte participated in the annual fleet maneuvers in the First Squadron, along with the ironclad Lepanto, Dogali, and several torpedo boats. The exercises were conducted in the Tyrrhenian Sea, where the First Squadron was tasked with defending against an attacking "hostile" squadron. By 1891, the Italian Navy had determined that Piemonte's armament was too heavy, and so the four broadside 6-inch guns were replaced with lighter 4.7-inch guns and their sponsons removed. In addition, the heavy military masts were replaced by light pole masts. In the following years, the ship served in the Red Sea and the Indian Ocean in addition to the Mediterranean. In mid-1896, violence against Italians in Brazil prompted the Italian government to dispatch Piemonte on a mission to secure the interests of Italian nationals in the country. While there, the ship was ordered to gather intelligence on Brazilian military readiness in preparation for a possible conflict. The attempt at gunboat diplomacy secured an official apology from the Brazilian government, as well as an arrangement to adjudicate Italian claims of damages by the United States' and German ambassadors.

In late 1901, Piemonte was assigned to the East Asian station after a year-long modernization. She passed through the Suez Canal and the Red Sea and stopped to coal in British Aden while en route to Asian waters. In September 1902 she was in Nagasaki, Japan, with the Italian cruiser Lombardia. Piemonte met the British cruiser HMS Talbot in the British colony at Weihaiwei. A party of officers and men from Piemonte visited the British ship on 28 July. That year, she was joined by the armored cruiser Vettor Pisani and the protected cruiser Elba. The following year, the armored cruiser Marco Polo and the protected cruiser Puglia were scheduled to replace Vettor Pisani and Piemonte, respectively, but due to the outbreak of the Russo-Japanese War on 8 February 1904, Piemonte remained in the region. On 24 February, Piemonte arrived in Seoul and landed a contingent of infantry to augment the guards at the Italian embassy. Piemonte was finally recalled to Italy in April; she stopped in Singapore on 22 April to coal, departing two days later for home.

By 1908, Piemonte had been assigned as the flagship of the torpedo flotilla of the main fleet, which consisted of seventeen destroyers and fifty first and second class torpedo boats. In August that year, Piemonte participated in the annual summer maneuvers of the Italian fleet. She was assigned to a squadron and was tasked with defending against an opponent fleet that attempted to force an amphibious landing. The maneuvers were modeled on a potential war with Italy's nominal ally Austria-Hungary, and the fact that the relative strengths of the two squadrons mirrored the Italian and Austro-Hungarian navies was not lost on analysts in Vienna. The maneuvers concluded with a fleet review on 18 October. Piemonte then spent 1909 deployed again to the Far East.

=== Italo-Turkish War ===
Map of the Red Sea, where Piemonte operated during the war

At the outbreak of the Italo-Turkish War in September 1911, Piemonte was stationed in the Red Sea with four other cruisers. In December, she and the other cruisers patrolled the Ottoman ports in the Red Sea for ships that might be preparing to carry a rumored invasion force across the narrow sea to Italian Eritrea. Hostilities were temporarily ceased while the British King George V passed through the Red Sea following his coronation ceremony in India—the ceasefire lasted until 26 November.

In early 1912, the Italian Red Sea Fleet searched for a group of seven Ottoman gunboats thought to be planning an attack on Eritrea, though they were in fact immobilized due to a lack of coal. Piemonte and the destroyers Artigliere and Garibaldino searched for the gunboats while the cruisers Calabria and Puglia carried out diversionary bombardments against Jebl Tahr, and Al Luḩayyah. On 7 January, they found the gunboats and quickly sank four in the Battle of Kunfuda Bay; the other three were forced to beach to avoid sinking as well. The next day, the Italian warships sent a shore party to destroy the grounded gunboats.

Piemonte and the rest of the Italian ships returned to bombarding the Turkish ports in the Red Sea before declaring a blockade of the city of Al Hudaydah on 26 January. Piemonte accidentally damaged the railroad that was being built by a French company when she bombarded the port of Djebana. As a result, the French firm sued the Italian government for the sum of 200,000 lire. By April, Piemonte was serving as the flagship of the Italian squadron in the Red Sea. On 27 July and 12 August, Piemonte, the torpedo cruisers Caprera and Aretusa conducted two bombardments of Al Hudaydah. During the 12 August attack, they destroyed an Ottoman ammunition dump. Piemonte thereafter left the Red Sea with four destroyers. The Ottomans eventually agreed to surrender in October, ending the war.

=== Later career ===
Then-Lieutenant Alessandro Guidoni proposed in 1912 to convert Piemonte into an aircraft carrier capable of operating seaplanes and fixed-wheel aircraft. His projected reconstruction would have seen an inclined flight deck erected on the aft half of the ship, tall enough to clear the ships' funnels. The Regia Marina were not interested in operating wheeled aircraft at sea and so the idea was not pursued. In 1913, the last two of the ship's 6-inch guns were replaced with 4.7-inch guns in another attempt to lighten the ship.

When Italy entered World War I on 23 May 1915, Piemonte was based in Brindisi and was assigned to the Second Fleet, which included the Regina Elena and Regina Margherita-class pre-dreadnought battleships and the Pisa and San Giorgio-class armored cruisers. The primary naval opponent for the duration of the war was the Austro-Hungarian Navy; the Naval Chief of Staff, Admiral Paolo Thaon di Revel, planned a distant blockade with the battle fleet, while smaller vessels, such as the MAS boats conducted raids. The heavy ships of the Italian fleet would be preserved for a potential major battle in the event that the Austro-Hungarian fleet should emerge from its bases. As a result, the ship's activities during the war was limited and she spent much of it based at Salonica, Greece, as part of the Anglo-French Levant Squadron. Plans to use her for torpedo trials after the war came to nothing and Piemonte was stricken from the Navy List on 15 May 1920 and broken up shortly afterwards.
