= Piedmont, Mercer County, West Virginia =

Piedmont, West Virginia
- Unincorporated community
- Location within the state of West Virginia Piedmont, West Virginia (the United States)
- Coordinates: 37°27′02″N 81°15′49″W
- Country: United States
- State: West Virginia
- County: Mercer
- Elevation: 2,428 ft (740 m)
- Time zone: UTC-5 (Eastern (EST))
  - Summer (DST): UTC-4 (EDT)
- Area codes: 304 & 681
- GNIS feature ID: 1555340

Piedmont is an unincorporated community in Mercer County, West Virginia, United States. Piedmont is 2.5 miles (4.0 km) northwest of Matoaka.
