= Piedmont High School =

Piedmont High School may refer to one of several high schools in the United States:

- Piedmont High School (Alabama) — Piedmont, Alabama
- Piedmont High School (California) — Piedmont, California
- Piedmont High School (North Carolina) — Monroe, North Carolina
- Piedmont High School (Oklahoma) — Piedmont, Oklahoma
- Piedmont Hills High School — San Jose, California
