= Piedmont, Virginia =

Piedmont, Virginia may refer to:

- Piedmont, Augusta County, Virginia
- Piedmont, Montgomery County, Virginia
- Piedmont, Nelson County, Virginia
- Piedmont region of Virginia
- Piedmont, West Virginia, once a part of Virginia
