= Piemontesi =

Piemontesi is an Italian surname. Notable people with the surname include:

- Domenico Piemontesi (1903–1987), Italian cyclist
- Fabrice Piemontesi (born 1983), Italian cyclist
- Francesco Piemontesi (born 1983), Swiss pianist
