= Piedmont Avenue =

Piedmont Avenue may refer to:

- Piedmont Avenue (Oakland, California), a neighborhood and street
- Piedmont Avenue (Berkeley), a historic street
- Piedmont Avenue and Piedmont Road, a major thoroughfare in Atlanta
