= Italian cruiser Liguria =

Protected cruiser of the Italian Royal Navy

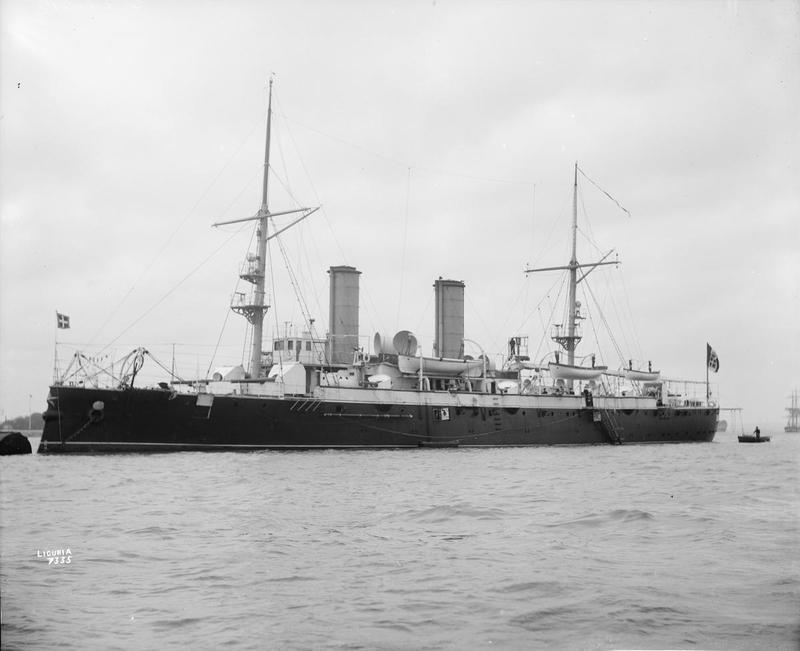
- Liguria at anchor in 1899

History

Italy
- Name: Liguria
- Namesake: Region of Liguria
- Builder: Gio. Ansaldo & C.
- Laid down: 1 July 1889
- Launched: 8 June 1893
- Completed: 1 December 1894
- Fate: Sold for scrapping, 15 May 1920

General characteristics
- Class & type: Regioni-class cruiser
- Displacement: Normal: 2,245 to 2,689 long tons (2,281 to 2,732 t); Full load: 2,411 to 3,110 long tons (2,450 to 3,160 t)
- Length: 84.8 m (278 ft 3 in)
- Beam: 12.03 m (39 ft 6 in)
- Draft: 4.67 m (15 ft 4 in)
- Installed power: 4 × fire-tube boilers; 5,536 ihp (4,128 kW)
- Propulsion: 2 × screw propellers; 2 × triple-expansion steam engines
- Speed: 18.1 knots (33.5 km/h; 20.8 mph)
- Range: 2,100 nmi (3,900 km; 2,400 mi) at 10 knots (19 km/h; 12 mph)
- Complement: 213–278
- Armament: 4 × 15 cm (5.9 in) guns; 6 × 12 cm (4.7 in) guns; 8 × 57 mm (2.24 in) guns; 2 × 37 mm (1.5 in) guns; 2 × 450 mm (17.7 in) torpedo tubes
- Armor: Deck: 50 mm (2 in); Conning tower: 50 mm

Liguria was a protected cruiser built for the Italian Regia Marina (Royal Navy). She was the fourth of six Regioni-class cruisers, all of which were named for regions of Italy. Liguria was built by the Ansaldo shipyard in Genoa; her keel was laid in July 1889, she was launched in June 1893, and was commissioned into the fleet in December 1894. The ship was equipped with a main armament of four 15 cm (5.9 in) and six 12 cm (4.7 in) guns, and she could steam at a speed of 18 knots (33 km/h; 21 mph).

Liguria served in a variety of roles throughout her career. She frequently was assigned to the main fleet, but in 1903–1905 she circumnavigated the world on a diplomatic and scientific mission under the Duke of the Abruzzi. In 1906, she conducted tests with coaling while at sea, and from 1908 to 1911, she was fitted with an experimental observation balloon. She saw extensive action during the Italo-Turkish War in 1911–1912. She took part in the seizure of Benghazi, provided gunfire support to the defenders of Tripoli, and conducted bombardments of Ottoman ports in western Libya and the Red Sea coast of Arabia. She was still in service during World War I as a training ship, but she did not see action during the conflict. Liguria was eventually sold for scrap in May 1921.

== Design ==
Plan and profile drawing of the Regioni class

Liguria was 84.8 meters (278 ft 3 in) long overall and had a beam of 12.03 m (39 ft 6 in) and a draft of 4.67 m (15 ft 4 in). Specific displacement figures have not survived for individual members of the class, but they displaced 2,245 to 2,689 long tons (2,281 to 2,732 t) normally and 2,411 to 3,110 long tons (2,450 to 3,160 t) at full load. The ships had a ram bow and a flush deck. Each vessel was fitted with a pair of pole masts. She had a crew of between 213 and 278.

Her propulsion system consisted of a pair of horizontal triple-expansion steam engines that drove two screw propellers. Steam was supplied by four cylindrical fire-tube boilers that were vented into two funnels. On her speed trials, she reached a maximum of 18.1 knots (33.5 km/h; 20.8 mph) at 5,536 indicated horsepower (4,128 kW). The ship had a cruising radius of about 2,100 nautical miles (3,900 km; 2,400 mi) at a speed of 10 knots (19 km/h; 12 mph).

Liguria was armed with a main battery of four 15 cm (5.9 in) L/40 guns mounted singly, with two side by side forward and two side by side aft. A secondary battery of six 12 cm (4.7 in) L/40 guns were placed between them, with three on each broadside. Close-range defense against torpedo boats consisted of eight 57 mm (2.24 in) guns two 37 mm (1.5 in) guns, and a pair of machine guns. She was also equipped with two 450 mm (17.7 in) torpedo tubes. Liguria was protected by a 50 mm (2 in) thick deck, and her conning tower had 50 mm thick sides.

== Service history ==
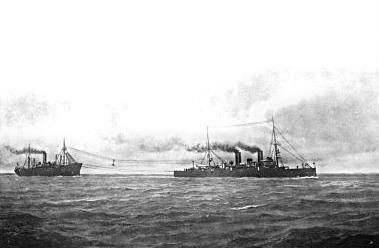
Liguria towing Sterope during coaling underway tests in 1906

Liguria was built by the Ansaldo shipyard in Genoa; her keel was laid on 1 July 1889. Shortages of funding slowed the completion Liguria and her sister ships. Tight budgets forced the Navy to reduce the pace of construction so that the funds could be used to keep the active fleet in service. It took nearly four years to complete the hull, which was launched on 8 June 1893. Fitting-out work proceeded much more quickly, and the new cruiser was ready for service a year and a half later. She was commissioned into the fleet on 1 December 1894. That year, Liguria was assigned to the Third Division of the Italian fleet, along with San Martino, an ancient center battery ironclad, which had been launched in 1862.

In early 1895, Liguria was sent to South American waters. During a visit to Pernambuco, Brazil, members of her crew got into a fight with Brazilian soldiers, though the incident was resolved without further escalation and the ship moved to Rio de Janeiro in April. One man from the ship contracted Yellow fever and died while Liguria was en route from Rio de Janeiro to Argentina. The ship was quarantined there for eight days. While in Argentina, three men died and another two contracted cholera or small pox. In October, the ship departed for home by way of Cape Verde.

In 1902–1903, Liguria was in the main Italian fleet; while in their normal peacetime training routine, the ships of the main fleet were kept in commission for exercises for seven months of the year. For the remaining five months, they were kept in a partial state of readiness with reduced crews. From 1903 to 1905, under the command of the Duke of the Abruzzi, Liguria circumnavigated the world on a diplomatic and scientific tour. Leaving La Spezia on 29 August 1903, she crossed the Atlantic to New Orleans before stops in Havana, Trinidad and Buenos Aires. She then went up the Pacific coast to San Francisco before making a crossing southeasterly crossing to Hawaii, Tahiti, New Zealand and Australia. From Australia she turned north to visit China before turning south again for stops in Bangkok, Singapore and Java. She crossed the Indian Ocean, stopping in Madras and Massawa before returning via the Suez Canal to La Spezia on 18 April 1905. The ship had stopped in 114 ports and crossed the equator six times.

In late 1906, the ship took part in experiments with coaling while underway. She towed the collier SS Sterope at a speed of 12 knots (22 km/h; 14 mph) while coal was transferred via the towing cable. An average of 60 t (59 long tons; 66 short tons) of coal was transferred per hour during the test. Starting in 1908, Liguria was modified to operate an observation balloon. This service, which lasted until 1911, involved towing a "draken" balloon—invented by the Germans August von Parseval and Rudolf von Sigsfeld—to spot naval mines for the fleet.

At the outbreak of the Italo-Turkish War in September 1911, Liguria was stationed in Italian Eritrea with four other cruisers. She was transferred to the Mediterranean Sea, and on 18 October she joined the escort for a troop convoy headed to Benghazi. The convoy was heavily protected against a possible Ottoman attack; the escort comprised the four Regina Elena-class pre-dreadnought battleships, two other cruisers, and five destroyers. The Italian fleet bombarded the city the next morning after the Ottoman garrison refused to surrender. During the bombardment, parties from the ships and the infantry from the troopships went ashore. The Italians quickly forced the Ottomans to withdraw into the city by evening. After a short siege, the Ottoman forces withdrew on 29 October, leaving the city to the Italians.

Liguria thereafter moved to Tripoli, where she supported the Italians who had taken the city against Turkish counterattacks. On 9 November, she, the armored cruiser Carlo Alberto, the minelayer Partenope, and the torpedo boat Cigno provided critical gunfire support that broke a series of Ottoman attacks on the city. A month later, Liguria joined Partenope and the torpedo boats Dardo and Euro for a series of bombardments on the ports of Zuwarah, Misrata, and Argub. Liguria then returned to Tripoli with Carlo Alberto, the torpedo cruiser Iride, and several torpedo boats while most of the Italian fleet returned to Italy for refitting. In January 1912, Liguria and her sister Elba were transferred to the Red Sea, along with a pair of fast mail steamers. The cruiser fleet in the Red Sea then began a campaign of coastal bombardments of Ottoman ports in the area. A blockade was proclaimed of the Ottoman ports, which included the cities of Al Luḩayyah and Al Hudaydah. The Ottomans eventually agreed to surrender in October, ending the war.

By the outbreak of World War I in August 1914, Liguria was assigned to the Third Division of the First Squadron as a training ship. Italy declared neutrality at the start of the war, but by May 1915, the Triple Entente had convinced the Italians to enter the war against the Central Powers. The old cruiser nevertheless saw no action during the war. She was sold for scrap on 15 May 1921 and was subsequently broken up.
