= Chippewa (disambiguation) =

Chippewa is an alternate term for the Ojibwe tribe of North America.

Chippewa may also refer to:

== Languages ==
- another name for the Ojibwe language
  - Chippewa language

== Places ==
=== United States ===
- Chippewa, Osceola County, Michigan, an unincorporated community
- Chippewa, Wisconsin, a town
- Chippewa County, Michigan
- Chippewa County, Minnesota
- Chippewa County, Wisconsin
- Chippewa Falls, Wisconsin, a city
- Chippewa Township, Chippewa County, Michigan
- Chippewa Township, Isabella County, Michigan
- Chippewa Township, Mecosta County, Michigan
- Chippewa Township, Ohio
- Chippewa Township, Beaver County, Pennsylvania
- Chippewa River (Michigan)
- Chippewa River (Minnesota)
- Chippewa River (Wisconsin)
- Chippewa Valley, Wisconsin
- Chippewa National Forest, Michigan
- Chippewa Nature Center, a protected wildlife area in the Lower Peninsula of Michigan; also a non-profit educational organization
- Lake Chippewa, a prehistoric lake whose basin is now Lake Michigan
- Lake Chippewa (Wisconsin) aka Chippewa Flowage

=== Canada ===
- Chippawa, Ontario, a community, sometimes spelled Chippewa in historical documents
- Chippewa River (Ontario)
- Chippewa Park, Ontario

== Schools ==
- Chippewa High School, Doylestown, Ohio, United States
- Chippewa Valley High School, Clinton Townships, Michigan, United States
- Chippewa Secondary School, North Bay, Ontario, Canada
- Chippewa Middle School, in the Okemos Public Schools school district, Michigan, United States
- Chippewa Middle School, in the Mounds View Public Schools school district, Minnesota, United States

== Other uses ==
- SS Chippewa, steamships with the name
- USS Chippewa, five vessels
- Central Michigan Chippewas, sports teams of Central Michigan University
- Chippewa-Hiawatha, originally named Chippewa, a passenger train that operated from 1937 to 1960
- Chippewa Street, the portion of Missouri Route 366 located in St. Louis, Missouri
- Chippewa Operating System, the operating system for the CDC 6600 supercomputer
- Chippewa Boots, a footwear and rainwear manufacturer originally known as Chippewa Shoe Manufacturing Company, founded in 1901
- Chippewa Correctional Facility, Michigan
- Colias chippewa, a butterfly

== Tribes and First Nations ==
- Bad River Band of the Lake Superior Tribe of Chippewa Indians of the Bad River Reservation, Wisconsin
- Chippewa Cree Indians of the Rocky Boy's Reservation, Montana
- Chippewas of Georgina Island First Nation, Ontario
- Chippewas of Kettle and Stony Point First Nation, Ontario
- Chippewas of Nawash Unceded First Nation, Ontario
- Chippewas of Rama First Nation, Ontario
- Chippewas of Sarnia First Nation, Ontario, now Aamjiwnaang First Nation
- Chippewas of Saugeen, southwestern Ontario, now Saugeen First Nation
- Chippewas of the Thames First Nation, Ontario
- Grand Traverse Band of Ottawa and Chippewa Indians, Michigan
- Lac Courte Oreilles Band of Lake Superior Chippewa Indians of Wisconsin
- Lac du Flambeau Band of Lake Superior Chippewa Indians of the Lac du Flambeau Reservation of Wisconsin
- Lac Vieux Desert Band of Lake Superior Chippewa Indians, Michigan
- Little Shell Tribe of Chippewa Indians of Montana
- Minnesota Chippewa Tribe, Minnesota
- Red Cliff Band of Lake Superior Chippewa Indians of Wisconsin
- Red Lake Band of Chippewa Indians, Minnesota
- Saginaw Chippewa Indian Tribe of Michigan
- Sault Ste. Marie Tribe of Chippewa Indians of Michigan
- Sokaogon Chippewa Community, Wisconsin
- St. Croix Chippewa Indians of Wisconsin
- Turtle Mountain Band of Chippewa Indians of North Dakota

== See also ==
- Chippawa (disambiguation)
- Chipewyan, a First Nations people in the Arctic region of Canada, unrelated to the Ojibwe
