= List of shipwrecks in 1908 =

This list of shipwrecks in 1908 includes ships sunk, foundered, grounded, or otherwise lost during 1908.

table of contents
1908
Jan	Feb	Mar	Apr
May	Jun	Jul	Aug
Sep	Oct	Nov	Dec
Unknown date

== January ==
=== 1 January ===
List of shipwrecks: 1 January 1908
Ship	State	Description
E. M. Dutlield	United States	The 92-gross register ton schooner foundered at Bridgeport, Connecticut. All three people on board survived.

=== 2 January ===
List of shipwrecks: 2 January 1908
Ship	State	Description
Julia Davis	United States	The 58-gross register ton schooner was lost in a collision with the barge Valentine in the eastern end of Long Island Sound off Fishers Island on the coast of New York. All three people aboard survived.

=== 3 January ===
List of shipwrecks: 3 January 1908
Ship	State	Description
Abram P. Skidmore	United States	The tug was sunk in the East River off Corlear's Hook in a collision with a car float towed by New York Central No. 8 (United States). Crew rescued by New York Central No. 8.
Eugene Batty	United States	The 19-gross register ton schooner was lost in a collision with the Quartermaster Corps screw steamer General Timothy Pickering ( United States Army) off Tampa, Florida. All three people on board survived.
Geo. R. Hand or George R. Hand	United States	The 34-gross register ton screw steamer was totally destroyed by fire at dock at the Great Lakes Engineering Works, Ecorse, Michigan. All three people on board survived.
Northern Eagle	United States	The 36-gross register ton schooner departed Key West, Florida, bound for Tampico, Mexico, with nine people on board and was never heard from again.

=== 4 January ===
List of shipwrecks: 4 January 1908
Ship	State	Description
Bluefields	United States	The 736-gross register ton steel-hulled screw steamer foundered in the Atlantic Ocean off Cape Hatteras, North Carolina. All 18 people on board lost their lives.
Manistique, Marquette, and Northern 1	United States	The steamer struck an unknown obstruction entering Harbor at Manistique, Michigan. She made it to her dock where she sank.

=== 7 January ===
List of shipwrecks: 7 January 1908
Ship	State	Description
D. Corson, jr.	United States	With no one on board, the 19-gross register ton schooner was wrecked at Newport News, Virginia.
Helen	United States	The 388-gross register ton barge was stranded on Fishers Island in New York at the eastern end of Long Island Sound after losing her towline to C. B. Sanford (United States). The only person on board survived.
Julia	United States	The 388-gross register ton barge was stranded on Fishers Island in New York at the eastern end of Long Island Sound after losing her towline to C. B. Sanford (United States).
Lizzie R Wilce	United Kingdom	The schooner was wrecked on Porthminster Beach, St. Ives, Cornwall, England. Her crew were rescued.

=== 8 January ===
List of shipwrecks: 8 January 1908
Ship	State	Description
John F. Miller	United States	With 30 fishermen, a crew of seven, and a cargo of 220 tons of salt and provisions aboard, the 170- or 179-gross register ton (sources disagree), 107-foot (32.6 m) schooner was wrecked with the loss of ten lives in either East Anchor Cove (54°41′30″N 163°04′00″W) or Bear Harbor (sources disagree) on the coast of Unimak Island in the Aleutian Islands after her anchor chains broke during a gale that struck while her crew was attempting to salvage the schooner Glen (United States), which had been wrecked there on 30 September 1907.
Leonora	United States	The 458-gross register ton schooner was stranded on the Diamond Shoals off Cape Hatteras, North Carolina, with the loss of five lives. There were two survivors.
Mary Barrow	United Kingdom	The schooner was beached on Porthminster beach, St. Ives, Cornwall. Her crew were rescued. Refloated a week later.

=== 9 January ===
List of shipwrecks: 9 January 1908
Ship	State	Description
Josephine Ellicott	United States	The 391-gross register ton schooner departed New York City bound for Mayport, Florida, with seven people on board and was never heard from again.

=== 10 January ===
List of shipwrecks: 10 January 1908
Ship	State	Description
John E. Devlin	United States	The 1,107-gross register ton schooner was stranded at Metomkin Island on the coast of Virginia. All nine people on board survived.

=== 11 January ===
List of shipwrecks: 11 January 1908
Ship	State	Description
Eclipse	United States	The ship was abandoned in the Pacific Ocean on a voyage from Newcastle, Australia to San Francisco, California. The next day one of the life boats capsized and two crewmen died of exposure as a result.

=== 12 January ===
List of shipwrecks: 12 January 1908
Ship	State	Description
Two Brothers	United States	The steamer sank at dock over night in the Ohio River at Legionville, Pennsylvania when her siphon pump was shut off. Later raised.

=== 13 January ===
List of shipwrecks: 13 January 1908
Ship	State	Description
City of Hartford	United States	The 29-gross register ton Launch vessel was destroyed by fire on Lake Salvador, in Louisiana. All six people on board survived.

=== 14 January ===
List of shipwrecks: 14 January 1908
Ship	State	Description
Malden	United States	The 537-gross register ton schooner foundered in the Atlantic Ocean off the Southeastern United States at 30°20′N 075°54′W. All eight people on board survived.
Mary L. Newhall	United States	The 1,310-gross register ton schooner foundered in the Atlantic Ocean 200 nautical miles (370 km; 230 mi) north of Bermuda. All 10 people on board survived.

=== 15 January ===
List of shipwrecks: 15 January 1908
Ship	State	Description
Lafayette	United States	With no one on board, the 77-gross register ton sternwheel paddle steamer foundered at Mount Carmel, Illinois.

=== 17 January ===
List of shipwrecks: 17 January 1908
Ship	State	Description
Anne Comber	United States	The 39-gross register ton schooner was stranded on Royal Shoal on the coast of North Carolina. All four people on board survived.

=== 18 January ===
List of shipwrecks: 18 January 1908
Ship	State	Description
USS Sioux	United States Navy	The Tug went ashore on Gull Rocks, Newport, Rhode Island. Refloated and returned to service.

=== 19 January ===
List of shipwrecks: 19 January 1908
Ship	State	Description
Epirus	Greece	The 3,276 GRT cargo ship, on passage from Sulina to Antwerp with a cargo of cotton, was run down in early morning fog by the Red Star Line ocean liner Finland (Belgium) in the Scheldt off Terneuzen (51°24′N 3°45′E) and subsequently sank.

=== 20 January ===
List of shipwrecks: 20 January 1908
Ship	State	Description
Sayre	United States	The tug struck bottom, or an obstruction, in the East River and sprang a leak. She sank at a pier at the foot of Third Street, New York City.

=== 22 January ===
List of shipwrecks: 22 January 1908
Ship	State	Description
Ada May	United States	While no one was on board, the 26-gross register ton schooner foundered in Pungoteague Creek in Virginia.
Baltimore	United States	The 692-gross register ton bark departed Hampton Roads, Virginia, bound for Savannah, Georgia, with nine people on board and was never heard from again.

=== 23 January ===
List of shipwrecks: 23 January 1908
Ship	State	Description
Greyhound	United States	The steamer struck a floating obstruction between Latanier Landing and Melville, Louisiana holing her hull. She sank with the top of her cabin roof above water. Passengers and crew made it to shore.
V. L. Watson	United States	The steamer sank in Bayou Willow, Louisiana while tied to the bank, later raised. One crewman killed.

=== 24 January ===
List of shipwrecks: 24 January 1908
Ship	State	Description
Custus W. Wright	United States	The 113-gross register ton schooner foundered at Newport News, Virginia, with the loss of all four people on board.
Fannie	United States	The 948-gross register ton iron-hulled barge sank off Barnegat, New Jersey after her tow line parted in a heavy gale and blinding snow storm . All six people on board survived.
Grafton	United States	The 531-gross register ton schooner barge or scow barge foundered in the Atlantic Ocean off Rhode Island 40 nautical miles (74 km; 46 mi) southwest of Block Island, with the loss of all three people on board.
Gwennie	United States	The 1,087-gross register ton schooner barge or scow barge foundered in the Atlantic Ocean 25 nautical miles (46 km; 29 mi) northeast of Barnegat, New Jersey, after her tow line parted in a heavy gale and blinding snow storm with the loss of all five people on board.
White Band	United States	The 1,186-gross register ton schooner barge or scow barge lost her tow in a blinding snowstorm and heavy winds and foundered off Cape Henlopen on the coast of Delaware, part of her hull discovered washed on shore 1 1/2 miles (2.4 km) north west of Overrfalls Shoals spar buoy the next day. Loss of all six people, four men and two women, on board.

=== 25 January ===
List of shipwrecks: 25 January 1908
Ship	State	Description
Fall River	United States	The 850-gross register ton schooner barge or scow barge foundered in the Atlantic Ocean off the coast of Rhode Island 40 nautical miles (74 km; 46 mi) southwest of Block Island. All three people on board survived.

=== 26 January ===
List of shipwrecks: 26 January 1908
Ship	State	Description
Helen G. Moseley	United States	The 566-gross register ton schooner was abandoned in the Atlantic Ocean 20 nautical miles (37 km; 23 mi) east of Cape Henry, Virginia. All nine people on board survived.
Mascot	United States	The 349-gross register ton barge foundered in the Chesapeake Bay at Thimble Shoal off the coast of Virginia. All four people on board survived.

=== 27 January ===
List of shipwrecks: 27 January 1908
Ship	State	Description
Edgar F. Luckenbach	United States	The tug was sunk in a collision with Pawnee (United States) between Governor's Island and The Battery in New York Harbor. One crewman killed. Survivors rescued by P. R. R. No. 9 (United States).
George R. Vreeland	United States	The 423-gross register ton schooner departed Hampton Roads, Virginia, bound for New York City with seven people on board and was never heard from again.
Matanzas	United States	The 1,579-gross register ton schooner barge or scow barge was stranded at Montauk, New York. All five people on board survived.

=== 28 January ===
List of shipwrecks: 28 January 1908
Ship	State	Description
Bart E. L. Molo	United States	The steamer sank at dock at Hickman, Kentucky. Raised and repaired.
Mary F. Golden	United States	The 37-gross register ton sternwheel paddle steamer burned to the waterline on Bayou Teche in Louisiana. Both people on board survived.
Resignacion	United States	The 9-gross register ton schooner was stranded at Guanica, Puerto Rico. All three people on board survived.

=== 29 January ===
List of shipwrecks: 29 January 1908
Ship	State	Description
Helen E. Taft	United States	The 1,197-gross register ton schooner was lost in a collision with the screw steamer Uppland (Sweden) off Cape Lookout on the coast of North Carolina. All ten people on board survived.
Lotus	United States	The 9-gross register ton sternwheel motor paddle vessel foundered in the Ohio River at Newburgh, Indiana. Both people on board survived.

=== 30 January ===
List of shipwrecks: 30 January 1908
Ship	State	Description
Edward J. Berwind	United States	The 1,141-gross register ton schooner was abandoned in the Atlantic Ocean east of North Carolina at 35°25′N 071°58′W. All nine people on board survived.
Gem	United States	The steamer sank in the Beouff River one mile (1.6 km) above Brown's Landing.

=== 31 January ===
List of shipwrecks: 31 January 1908
Ship	State	Description
Industry	United States	The 26-gross register ton schooner foundered in Bodkin Creek in Maryland. All three people on board survived.
New York Central No. 24	United States	The tug was sunk in a collision with Colorado (United States) off Governor's Island in New York Harbor. One crewman killed. Survivors rescued by Towanda (United States).

=== Unknown date ===
List of shipwrecks: Unknown date 1968
Ship	State	Description
Petrel	United States	The schooner was wrecked in Pybus Bay (57°16′N 134°05′W) on Admiralty Island in the Alexander Archipelago in Southeast Alaska.

== February ==
=== 1 February ===
List of shipwrecks: 1 February 1908
Ship	State	Description
Julia Baker	United States	The 108-gross register ton schooner was stranded at Milbridge, Maine. All three people on board survived.
Waldron Holmes	United States	The 59-gross register ton schooner was stranded at Point Francis, Maine. All four people on board survived.

=== 2 February ===
List of shipwrecks: 2 February 1908
Ship	State	Description
Windsor	United Kingdom	The 2,892-gross register ton steam cargo ship was wrecked on Half Moon Reef, Houtman Abrolhos islands off the coast of Western Australia. Five of her crew of 37 were lost.

=== 3 February ===
List of shipwrecks: 3 February 1908
Ship	State	Description
Roda	United Kingdom	The 2,516-gross register ton steam cargo ship was wrecked in dense fog on Jones Beach Island off the south coast of Long Island, New York. Her crew survived. Her wreck sank in 20 feet (6 m) of water.

=== 4 February ===
List of shipwrecks: 4 February 1908
Ship	State	Description
Abby Morse	United States	The 34-gross register ton schooner was stranded in Narraguagus Bay on the coast of Maine. Both people on board survived.
Emelie E. Birdsall	United States	The 491-gross register ton schooner was lost on Winter Quarter Shoal off the coast of Virginia when she collided with the screw steamer Jefferson (United States). Of the seven people aboard Emelie E. Birdsall, three lost their lives.

=== 5 February ===
List of shipwrecks: 8 February 1908
Ship	State	Description
Favorite	United States	The steamboat sank at her moorings at Coquille, Oregon. She was later refloated, repaired, and returned to service.
George	United States	The 29-gross register ton sloop either was lost at Nome, Alaska, or sank off Dauphin Island on the coast of Alabama, according to different sources. Both people on board survived.

=== 6 February ===
List of shipwrecks: 6 February 1908
Ship	State	Description
S. O. Co. No. 7	United States	The tug stranded on Nonamesett Island in Vineyard Sound after her prop hit rocks. Later raised and repaired.

=== 7 February ===
List of shipwrecks: 7 February 1908
Ship	State	Description
Any One	United States	With no one on board, the 9-gross register ton sternwheel motor paddle vessel foundered off Prairietown, Indiana.

=== 8 February ===
List of shipwrecks: 8 February 1908
Ship	State	Description
F. L. Lowell	United States	The 5-gross register ton schooner was stranded at Rodicks Island on the coast of Maine. Both people on board survived.

=== 8 February ===
List of shipwrecks: 8 February 1908
Ship	State	Description
Jewel	United States	The steamer, while laid up for the winter at the mouth of the Muskingum River, caught on gorged ice, she careened when pulled off and sank in 12 feet (3.7 m) of water.

=== 10 February ===
List of shipwrecks: 10 February 1908
Ship	State	Description
Addie B. Bacon	United States	The 422-gross register ton barge was stranded at Flynns Knoll, New York. All seven people on board survived.

=== 11 February ===
List of shipwrecks: 11 February 1908
Ship	State	Description
Kate McNamara	United States	The 65-gross register ton schooner burned in the Choptank River off Tilghman Island in Maryland. All four people on board survived.

=== 13 February ===
List of shipwrecks: 13 February 1908
Ship	State	Description
Dudley Pray	United States	The 215-gross register ton screw steamer was wrecked on the breakwater at Rockport, Massachusetts in thick weather, a total loss. All 11 people on board survived.
Mollie S. Look	United States	The 572-gross register ton schooner was stranded in Hillsboro Inlet on the coast of North Carolina. All eight people on board survived.
Robert Pettis	United States	The oyster steamer was holed by ice in the Providence River and beached off Field's Point.

=== 14 February ===
List of shipwrecks: 14 February 1908
Ship	State	Description
Emily Reed	United States	The 1,564-gross register ton full-rigged ship — a Down Easter — was stranded on the beach at Nehalem, Oregon, at the mouth of the Nehalem River. Of the 16 people aboard, 11 lost their lives.
Mandalay	United Kingdom	The 103-foot (31 m) 148 ton steam trawler was wrecked in dense fog at Ravenscar, North Yorkshire.
Robt. Taylor	United States	The steamer was sunk by ice in the Ohio River while laying at Coraopolis, Pennsylvania. Later raised.

=== 15 February ===
List of shipwrecks: 15 February 1908
Ship	State	Description
Bruce	United States	The 358-gross register ton barge was stranded at Galveston, Texas. The only person on board survived.
Edward F. Cullen	United States	The 292-gross register ton barge was stranded at New Haven, Connecticut. All four people on board survived.
Helen R. Cullen	United States	The 295-gross register ton barge was stranded at New Haven, Connecticut. All three people on board survived.
Helene	United States	The 19-gross register ton motor yacht burned at New Berlin, Florida. All four people on board survived.
H. H. Conklin	United States	The 350-gross register ton barge went aground between Hatchetts Reef and Saybrook, Connecticut in heavy weather after losing her towline to her tow vessel Nathan Hale (United States) off Horton's Point, Long Island Sound. Refloated by Wreckers. Everyone on board survived.
Hope	United States	The 350-gross register ton barge went aground between Hatchetts Reef and Saybrook, Connecticut in heavy weather after losing her towline to her tow vessel Nathan Hale (United States) off Horton's Point, Long Island Sound. Refloated by wreckers. Everyone on board survived.
Howard B. Peck	United States	The 472-gross register ton schooner was stranded on Fire Island on the coast of Long Island, New York. All eight people on board survived.
Joseph W. Drayton	United States	The 437-gross register ton barge was stranded at New Haven, Connecticut. The only person on board survived.
Juno	United States	The 41-gross register ton screw steamer burned at Charleston, South Carolina. All five people on board survived.
Melrose	United States	The 693-gross register ton schooner was stranded at Cape Hatteras. North Carolina. All eight people on board survived.
Rosalie M	United States	The steamer was forced into the bank by a storm causing a leak that sank her in ten minutes in the New Orleans area.
S. W. Pring	United States	The 350-gross register ton barge sank in heavy weather after losing the towline to her tow vessel Nathan Hale (United States) off Horton's Point, Long Island Sound. Both people on board survived.
Wm. H. Skinner	United States	The 262-gross register ton schooner was abandoned in the Atlantic Ocean 45 nautical miles (83 km; 52 mi) east-northeast of Frying Pan Shoals off the coast of North Carolina. All six people on board survived.

=== 16 February ===
List of shipwrecks: 16 February 1908
Ship	State	Description
Lord Rosebery	United Kingdom	The 120.1-foot (36.6 m), 229-ton steam trawler was damaged in a collision with the trawler Gaul (United Kingdom) off Utakalar. She sank under tow by Gaul off Cape Utskalar Lighthouse, Faxe Bay, Iceland. The crew taken off by Gaul.

=== 18 February ===
List of shipwrecks: 18 February 1908
Ship	State	Description
Anspach	United States	The 15-gross register ton screw steamer foundered in a severe snowstorm when the weight of slush ice forced her down enough to fill and sink off Waukegan, Illinois, a total loss. Two crewmen lost. There were four survivors.
HMS Hero	Royal Navy	The decommissioned Conqueror-class ironclad battleship was sunk as a target in the North Sea off the Kentish Knock.

=== 19 February ===
List of shipwrecks: 19 February 1908
Ship	State	Description
Frank Sessoms	United States	The steamer developed a leak in a gale at Waverly Creek in South Carolina. She was run aground on a mud bank and the passengers evacuated on the lifeboat. Ship's cook drowned.

=== 21 February ===
List of shipwrecks: 21 February 1908
Ship	State	Description
Albatross	United States	The 8-gross register ton sloop was "cut down by ice" at Great Kills on Staten Island in New York City. Both people on board survived.
Imperial	Canada	The steamer filled and sank while loading cargo at Chicago. Afterwards pumped out and raised.
Whisper	United States	The ferry sank at dock at Augusta, Kentucky.

=== 25 February ===
List of shipwrecks: 25 February 1908
Ship	State	Description
Crane	United Kingdom	The 118.1-foot (36.0 m), 209-ton steam trawler was wrecked.

=== Unknown date ===
List of shipwrecks: Unknown date February 1908
Ship	State	Description
Magnus Mail	United Kingdom	The cargo ship ran aground outside Garston Docks, Liverpool, England. She was refloated, repaired, and returned to service.
Molly	United States	The 6-gross register ton sloop foundered in the Chesapeake Bay. Both people on board survived.

== March ==
=== 3 March ===
List of shipwrecks: 3 March 1908
Ship	State	Description
Thomas B. Hambleton	United States	With no one on board, the 20-gross register ton schooner foundered in Hunting Creek in Virginia.

=== 7 March ===
List of shipwrecks: 7 March 1908
Ship	State	Description
Stella Moren	United States	While attempting to enter the lock at Government Lock and Dam No. 2 on the Monongahela River in Pennsylvania about 11 miles (18 km) above Pittsburgh with two or three (sources disagree) 1,000-ton, approximately 175-foot (53.3 m) coal boats in tow, the 215-gross register ton, approximately 150-foot (45.7 m) sternwheel paddle steamer lost control of her tow, was swept over the dam, and sank in 30 feet (9.1 m) of water about 200 feet (61 m) below the dam with the loss of three crewmen, a total loss. There were 12 survivors. The coal boats also went over the dam and broke up downstream.

=== 8 March ===
List of shipwrecks: 8 March 1908
Ship	State	Description
Traveler	United States	The 9-gross register ton schooner was stranded on Pelican Island off Galveston, Texas. The only person on board survived.

=== 12 March ===
List of shipwrecks: 12 March 1908
Ship	State	Description
Newark Castle	United Kingdom	The Union-Castle Line passenger/cargo ship ran aground in calm weather 4 nautical miles (7.4 km) from Richard's Bay, South Africa

=== 13 March ===
List of shipwrecks: 13 March 1908
Ship	State	Description
Bear	United States	The 11-net register ton, 38.7-foot (11.8 m) schooner dragged her anchor in bad weather and was wrecked on rocks at Kashega (53°28′50″N 167°10′30″W) on Unalaska Island in the Aleutian Islands, 80 nautical miles (150 km; 92 mi) from Unalaska. Her crew of three survived.
Berwick	United States	The 100-gross register ton motor vessel was stranded on the Siuslaw River Bar on the coast of Oregon, a total loss. Her machinery and cargo was salvaged. All seven people on board survived.
SMS S12	Imperial German Navy	The torpedo boat sank after a collision at the mouth of the Elbe at Cuxhaven, Germany.

=== 14 March ===
List of shipwrecks: 14 March 1908
Ship	State	Description
Silvia	Dominion of Newfoundland	During a voyage from New York City to St. John's, Newfoundland and Labrador, the 1,794-gross register ton cargo liner was wrecked during a gale at night without loss of life on the east side of Sow and Pigs Reef off Cuttyhunk Island, Massachusetts, at 41°23′58″N 070°57′55″W.

=== 16 March ===
List of shipwrecks: 16 March 1908
Ship	State	Description
Mildred	United States	The 464-gross register ton schooner was stranded in Grays Harbor on the coast of Washington. All nine people on board survived.

=== 17 March ===
List of shipwrecks: 17 March 1908
Ship	State	Description
John Dippel	United States	The tug was swept under a barge by swift current and sunk in the Allegheny River at the foot of Sixteenth Street Pittsburgh, Pennsylvania. Later raised and returned to service.
USS Monongahela	United States Navy	The store ship was destroyed by fire at Guantanamo Bay, Cuba.
Pomona	United States	The 1,264-gross register ton iron-hulled screw steamer struck a rock and was wrecked on a reef at Fort Ross, California during a failed attempt to beach her, a total loss of vessel and cargo. All 147 people on board made it to shore in her boats.
Teddie	United States	The tug sprung a leak and sank off Portsmouth, Virginia.

=== 20 March ===
List of shipwrecks: 20 March 1908
Ship	State	Description
Saratoga	United States	During a voyage in the waters of the District of Alaska from Valdez to Cordova with a crew of 78 and a cargo of 300 tons of copper ore and general merchandise aboard, the 2,820-gross register ton, 298-foot (90.8 m) steel-hulled screw steamer was wrecked on the southwest end of Busby Island (60°53′30″N 146°42′00″W) in Prince William Sound in Southcentral Alaska during a snowstorm. The steamer Elsie (United States) took off her passengers, and all 118 people on board survived.

=== 21 March ===
List of shipwrecks: 21 March 1908
Ship	State	Description
Wabash	United States	The 7-gross register ton sternwheel motor paddle vessel foundered at Mount Carmel, Illinois. The only person on board survived.

=== 23 March ===
List of shipwrecks: 25 March 1908
Ship	State	Description
Edward Annan	United States	The tug caught fire in the starboard coal bunker and was beached in Spuyten Duyvil Creek just north of the bridge. Crew abandoned ship in the lifeboat. Steamer Hustler (United States) came alongside and put out the fire and towed her to Brooklyn, where she was repaired.
Matsu Maru	Japan	The steamer was sunk in a collision off Hakodate. 300 killed.

=== 25 March ===
List of shipwrecks: 25 March 1908
Ship	State	Description
Columbia	United States	The 197-gross register ton sternwheel paddle steamer was lost while navigating when she struck the wall of Lock 18 in the Ohio River near Marietta, Ohio.

=== 28 March ===
List of shipwrecks: 28 March 1908
Ship	State	Description
Christina	United States	The 11-gross register ton motor paddle vessel burned on the Ohio River at Lawrenceburg, Indiana. All three people on board survived.

=== 29 March ===
List of shipwrecks: 29 March 1908
Ship	State	Description
Bega	Australia	The Illawarra & South Coast Steam Navigation Company 567 GRT steamship sank off Tathra, New South Wales, Australia.

=== 30 March ===
List of shipwrecks: 30 March 1908
Ship	State	Description
Lydia	United States	The 39-gross register ton schooner was lost in a collision with the screw steamer Chippewa (United States) off Point No Point, Washington. Two of the 10 people on board lost their lives.
T. G. Lester	United States	The 257-gross register ton schooner barge or scow barge foundered at Detroit, Michigan. The only person on board survived.

=== 31 March ===
List of shipwrecks: 31 March 1908
Ship	State	Description
Deborah T. Hill	United States	The 37-gross register ton schooner was lost in a collision with a barge in the East River off 46th Street in New York City. Both people on board survived.

== April ==
=== 2 April ===
List of shipwrecks: 2 April 1908
Ship	State	Description
Star of Japan	United Kingdom	The steamer was wrecked on the West African coast by the Pedra de Galha rock, near Cabo Barbas, about 100 miles (160 km) south of Villa Cisneros, Spanish colony of Río de Oro.
HMS Tiger	Royal Navy	The three-funnel 30-knot destroyer was sliced in two when she crossed the bows of the armoured cruiser HMS Berwick (Royal Navy) during night exercises and Berwick collided with her. Both sections of her hull sank, although her bow section remained afloat long enough for 22 members of her crew to be rescued. Thirty-six members of her crew were lost.

=== 4 April ===
List of shipwrecks: 4 April 1908
Ship	State	Description
George McCaffrey	United States	The 172-gross register ton canal boat foundered on Penfield Reef in Long Island Sound. The only person on board survived.

=== 6 April ===
List of shipwrecks: 6 April 1908
Ship	State	Description
Lady	United States	The 20-gross register ton schooner was stranded on the coast of Oahu in the Territory of Hawaii. Both people on board survived.

=== 7 April ===
List of shipwrecks: 7 April 1908
Ship	State	Description
A. Gerdes & Bro	United States	The 8-gross register ton motor vessel was stranded at Petit Pass in Louisiana. All four people on board survived.

=== 8 April ===
List of shipwrecks: 8 April 1908
Ship	State	Description
H. E. Thompson	United States	The 683-gross register ton schooner was stranded on Anegada in the British Virgin Islands. All 10 people on board survived.

=== 9 April ===
List of shipwrecks: 9 April 1908
Ship	State	Description
Eva	United States	The paddle steamer struck a snag, was beached, and sank without loss of life on the Umpqua River near Scottsburg, Oregon.
J. H. Chaffee	United States	The 130-gross register ton schooner departed Boston, Massachusetts, bound for New York City with four people on board and was never heard from again.

=== 10 April ===
List of shipwrecks: 10 April 1908
Ship	State	Description
Jennie	United States	The motor boat was wrecked and sunk by ice in the Missouri River at Mondak, Montana.

=== 11 April ===
List of shipwrecks: 11 April 1908
Ship	State	Description
Persia	United Kingdom	The tug collided with the steamship Huguenot (United Kingdom) and sank near the Sunk Lightvessel, off the coast of Essex, England.

=== 12 April ===
List of shipwrecks: 12 April 1908
Ship	State	Description
Mary	United States	With no one on board, the 360-gross register ton screw steamer burned at Boston, Massachusetts.

=== 13 April ===
List of shipwrecks: 13 April 1908
Ship	State	Description
Lake City	United States	The 17-gross register ton sternwheel paddle steamer foundered at Togo, Arkansas. All five people on board survived.

=== 14 April ===
List of shipwrecks: 14 April 1908
Ship	State	Description
H. G. Johnson	United States	The 1,082-gross register ton bark was stranded on the Cumberland Bar on the coast of Georgia. All 12 people on board survived.

=== 15 April ===
List of shipwrecks: 15 April 1908
Ship	State	Description
Addie F. Cole	United States	The 76-gross register ton schooner foundered in the North Anclote Channel in Florida. All 23 people on board survived.

=== 16 April ===
List of shipwrecks: 16 April 1908
Ship	State	Description
Lizzie	United States	The 29-gross register ton schooner was stranded in Penobscot Bay on the coast of Maine with the loss of one life. There was one survivor.

=== 18 April ===
List of shipwrecks: 18 April 1908
Ship	State	Description
Orient	United States	The 93-gross register ton schooner was stranded at Cape Lookout on the coast of North Carolina. All 18 people on board survived.

=== 19 April ===
List of shipwrecks: 19 April 1908
Ship	State	Description
Clara C	United States	The 46-gross register ton motor vessel burned off Cape Scott in Washington. All 11 people on board survived.

=== 20 April ===
List of shipwrecks: 20 April 1908
Ship	State	Description
J. A. Watkins	United States	The 15-gross register ton Bugeye was lost in a collision with the screw steamer Alabama (United States) in the Chesapeake Bay off Seven Foot Knoll on the coast of Maryland. Both people on board survived.

=== 21 April ===
List of shipwrecks: 21 April 1908
Ship	State	Description
Eulallie C.	United States	The steamer burned to the waterline at Morgan City, Louisiana, probably a total loss.

=== 23 April ===
List of shipwrecks: 23 April 1908
Ship	State	Description
Gracie Kent	United States	The steamer struck an obstruction and sank in one minute in Bayou Teche 1 1/2 miles (2.4 km) below Baldwin, Louisiana in 11 feet (3.4 m) of water. One crewman missing.
May D.	United States	The steamer was destroyed by fire at dock at Gibraltar, Michigan.
Stonewall	United States	The 13-gross register ton sloop foundered off Fort Sumter, Charleston, South Carolina. Both people on board survived.
Xibalda	United States	The 13-gross register ton schooner was stranded in Choctawhatchee Bay on the coast of Florida. Both people on board survived.

=== 24 April ===
List of shipwrecks: 24 April 1908
Ship	State	Description
Ben Macdui	Belgium	The vessel foundered off Egerö, Norway.
Katherine	United States	The 94-gross register ton barge foundered 20 nautical miles (37 km; 23 mi) west of Ship Shoal on the coast of Virginia. All three people on board survived.
Kittiwake	United Kingdom	The Elder Dempster 241 GRT cargo ship used in the Lagos creeks service ran aground on Lagos Bar, Nigeria. Declared total wreck on 28 April 1908.

=== 25 April ===
List of shipwrecks: 25 April 1908
Ship	State	Description
Duchess	Canada	The fishing steamer sank at dock at Peoria, Illinois. Later raised.
HMS Gladiator	Royal Navy	The Arrogant-class protected cruiser collided with the ocean liner Saint Paul (United States) and sank in the English Channel, or beached off Black Rock Buoy, off the Isle of Wight, with the loss of 28 of her crew. Refloated and scrapped.

=== 26 April ===
List of shipwrecks: 26 April 1908
Ship	State	Description
Maud Spurling	United States	The 53-gross register ton schooner was stranded in Pensacola Bay on the coast of Florida. All seven people on board survived.
Miriam	United States	The steamer was wrecked by a cyclone in the Mississippi River near Hardin's Point, Arkansas, a total loss. Nine passengers and two crew killed.

=== 27 April ===
List of shipwrecks: 27 April 1908
Ship	State	Description
Flora	United States	The 5-gross register ton schooner foundered off Key Largo in the Florida Keys off the coast of Florida. Both people on board survived.
HMS Gala	Royal Navy	The Yarrow Type River-class destroyer was sliced in two when the scout cruiser HMS Attentive (Royal Navy) collided with her during night exercises. Gala's stern section sank immediately with the loss of one life; her bow section sank later during an attempt to tow it to shallow water. Attentive then also collided with the destroyer HMS Ribble (Royal Navy), holing Ribble below the waterline and forcing her to return to base.
Rob Roy	United States	The 97-gross register ton schooner was stranded in Arthur Bay on the coast of Wisconsin. All five people on board survived.
Scott	United States	The canal boat sank in a collision with Nashotah (United States) at Chicago.

=== 28 April ===
List of shipwrecks: 28 April 1908
Ship	State	Description
Argo	United States	The steamer grounded in the Eel River, California. Refloated on 11 July.
Chignik No. 1 (or Chignik #1)	United States	The 70-gross register ton scow sank off Cape Cleare (59°45′N 148°54′W) on the south end of Montague Island on the south-central coast of the District of Alaska. The only person on board survived.
William H. Wessels	United States	The 277-gross register ton barge was lost in a collision with the screw steamer Islander (United States) off Sands Point, New York. The only person on board survived.

=== 29 April ===
List of shipwrecks: 29 April 1908
Ship	State	Description
Miriam	United States	The 65-gross register ton sternwheel paddle steamer capsized in the Mississippi River off Hardin Point, Arkansas, killing 11 of the 65 people on board.

=== 30 April ===
List of shipwrecks: 30 April 1908
Ship	State	Description
Matsushima	Imperial Japanese Navy	The Matsushima-class protected cruiser was lost due to an accidental magazine explosion at Mako, Pescadores. A total of 206 crew killed.
Peter Rickmers	Germany	Peter Rickmers The full-rigged ship was driven ashore on Fire Island, New York, United States.

=== Unknown date ===
List of shipwrecks: Unknown date 1908
Ship	State	Description
Archangel	Russia	The ferry sank in the Neva River sometime in April. 39 died.

== May ==
=== 1 May ===
List of shipwrecks: 1 May 1908
Ship	State	Description
Nellie	United States	The barge sank near the mouth of the Patapsco River in a gale and high seas. Her crew survived.
R. H. Becker	United States	The 140-gross register ton schooner capsized in the harbor at Sheboygan, Wisconsin. All five people on board survived.
Victor	United States	The 35-gross register ton schooner was stranded on Block Island off the coast of Rhode Island. All 14 people on board survived.

=== 2 May ===
List of shipwrecks: 2 May 1908
Ship	State	Description
Minnie E. Kelton	United States	The 632-gross register ton screw steamer was stranded at Yaquina Head on the coast of Oregon with the loss of 11 lives. There were 10 survivors.

=== 3 May ===
List of shipwrecks: 3 May 1908
Ship	State	Description
Albion	United Kingdom	The vessel was stranded on Carromeiro Chico Rock when entering Corcubión on passage from Bahia Blanca for Rotterdam with grain, broke amidships and sunk.
Auguste & Jean	Belgium	The fishing vessel was rammed and sunk by Iris (Belgium) 8 nautical miles (15 km) southwest of the Noordhinder Lightship (Netherlands). Three of her four crew were lost.
Trenton	United States	The steamer sank at dock at Alexandria, Virginia. An infant passenger died. Later raised.

=== 6 May ===
List of shipwrecks: 6 May 1908
Ship	State	Description
Clarence	United States	The steamer caught fire and was destroyed while laid up for the night on the east side of the Mobile River.
Hellas	Greece	The 3,613 GRT freighter ran aground and was wrecked at Cape Malea on passage Sulina for Liverpool with a cargo of wheat.

=== 8 May ===
List of shipwrecks: 8 May 1908
Ship	State	Description
David E. Baxter	United States	The 173-gross register ton barge foundered off St. George, Staten Island, New York. The only person on board survived.
Nautilus	United States	The steamer sank at dock in a storm when she listed to starboard, filling through an open valve at Burlington, Iowa. Later raised.

=== 10 May ===
List of shipwrecks: 10 May 1908
Ship	State	Description
Albert Nickel	United States	The 35-gross register ton schooner was stranded at Hungry Creek in Virginia. Both people on board survived.
Pyrgos	Germany	The 1,927 GRT freighter with a cargo of grain on passage from Ibrail to Hamburg collided with the steamer Violet (United Kingdom) during fog in the river Elbe. The German steamer sank and one crew member was badly injured.

=== 11 May ===
List of shipwrecks: 11 May 1908
Ship	State	Description
Haze	United States	The 58-gross register ton schooner foundered off Bonacca off the coast of Honduras. All eight people on board survived.
Penobscot	United States	The 358-gross register ton schooner was stranded on Two Bush Island on the coast of Maine. All six people on board survived.

=== 13 May ===
List of shipwrecks: 13 May 1908
Ship	State	Description
J. N. Harbin	United States	The steamer struck a snag in the Arkansas River near Coco Landing and was beached on a bar and sank. Later raised.

=== 14 May ===
List of shipwrecks: 14 May 1908
Ship	State	Description
J. C. Austin	United States	The canal boat struck an obstruction and sank in the East River near the mouth of Newtown Creek and Twenty-Sixth Street.

=== 15 May ===
List of shipwrecks: 15 May 1908
Ship	State	Description
William Baylies	United States	The 380-gross register ton, 118.5-foot (36.1 m) steam screw whaling bark was crushed by ice and lost in Anadyr Bay off the coast of Siberia at 63°36′N 179°51′W. Her entire crew of 43 survived and was rescued by the steamer Bowhead (United States).
William McGee	United States	The 85-gross register ton schooner foundered off Sea Isle City, New Jersey. All four people on board survived.

=== 17 May ===
List of shipwrecks: 17 May 1908
Ship	State	Description
Nordsee	Germany	The 4,439 GRT freighter with a cargo of iron ore on passage from Narvik to Rotterdam was struck by the steamer Avoca (United Kingdom) off Nieuwe Waterweg. The German steamer sank with a loss of one crew and a pilot. Avoca had her bow smashed in and had to be beached to avoid sinking.

=== 20 May ===
List of shipwrecks: 20 May 1908
Ship	State	Description
Fevue Arland	United States	The 7-gross register ton motor vessel was stranded at Galveston, Texas. All four people on board survived.
George Weems	United States	The 416-gross register ton screw steamer burned and sank in the Atlantic Ocean at the Frying Pan Shoals off Cape Fear on the coast of North Carolina. The crew made it to the Frying Pan Shoals Lightship in a lifeboat where they saw the ship sink.

=== 22 May ===
List of shipwrecks: 22 May 1908
Ship	State	Description
H. T. Hedges	United States	The 239-gross register ton schooner foundered off Whitestone, Queens, New York. All five people on board survived.
Unknown	United States	A schooner, adrift on the tide, collided with an anchored barge off Whitestone, Queens, New York and was beached to prevent sinking.

=== 23 May ===
List of shipwrecks: 23 May 1908
Ship	State	Description
Agnes E. Boyd	United States	The 31-gross register ton, 55-foot (16.8 m) sternwheel paddle steamer was destroyed by the spring break-up of ice on the Kobuk River in the northern District of Alaska. All six people on board survived.
Cosmos	United States	The 47-gross register ton schooner was stranded on Baker Island Bar on the coast of Maine. All 10 people on board survived.
H. M. Whitney	United States	The steamer went aground in the East River on the south west end of Ward's Island. She was able to back off, but hit Flood Rock and sank. Later refloated, but still in place on 2 June.
Scorpion	United States	With no one on board, the 14-gross register ton sloop-rigged yacht burned at Erie, Pennsylvania.

=== 24 May ===
List of shipwrecks: 24 May 1908
Ship	State	Description
Arthur Clifford	United States	The 84-gross register ton schooner was lost in a collision in thick fog with the screw steamer Governor Dingley (United States) near Thacher Island on the coast of Massachusetts off Cape Ann. Both people on board survived.

=== 25 May ===
List of shipwrecks: 25 May 1908
Ship	State	Description
Mineola	United States	With no one on board, the 15-gross register ton schooner foundered in Mobile Bay off Daphne, Alabama.
Wanderer	United States	The steam yacht ran aground on Black Ledge, near Niantic, Connecticut. The next day she suddenly backed off the rocks and collided with salvage vessels trying to haul her off.

=== 26 May ===
List of shipwrecks: 26 May 1908
Ship	State	Description
Lamyron	Greece	During a voyage from Taganrog, Russia, with a cargo of grain, the 2,408-gross register ton cargo ship was stranded on Corticeiras Rock off Corcubión, Spain, and became a total loss.
Reindeer	United States	The 21-gross register ton screw steamer burned at Bordentown, New Jersey. All four people on board survived.

=== 27 May ===
List of shipwrecks: 27 May 1908
Ship	State	Description
Arminza	Spain	The 2,501 GRT freighter with a cargo of ore on passage from Bilbao for Middlesbrough struck a rock off La Vendree, five miles (8.0 km) west of Cap de la Chèvre, and came off but subsequently sunk in deep water and became a total loss.
Lizzie Cochran	United States	The 188-gross register ton schooner departed Vineyard Haven, Massachusetts, bound for Machias, Maine, with five people on board and was never heard from again.

=== 28 May ===
List of shipwrecks: 28 May 1908
Ship	State	Description
Bertha C	United States	The 11-gross register ton screw steamer foundered in the Atchafalaya River at Butte La Rose, Louisiana. After sinking she slid down slope 60 feet (18 m) out in 60 feet of water. All three people on board survived.
Fame	United States	The 130-gross register ton schooner sank in the North Atlantic Ocean with the loss of 18 lives after colliding with the screw steamer Boston (United Kingdom) 70 nautical miles (130 km; 81 mi) off the coast of Maine. There were two survivors.

=== 29 May ===
List of shipwrecks: 29 May 1908
Ship	State	Description
Helen	United States	With no one on board, the docked 31-gross register ton screw steamer was struck by lightning and burned at Detroit Michigan, a total loss.
Maggie	United States	The 19-gross register ton screw steamer burned at Mulat, Florida. All four people on board survived.

=== 30 May ===
List of shipwrecks: 30 May 1908
Ship	State	Description
Carrie H. Annis	United States	The 24-gross register ton schooner was stranded at Pawtuxet, Rhode Island. Both people on board survived.
Jerome	United States	The steamer was struck by a storm while tied to the bank at Port Hickory, Louisiana causing her to list, fill with water, and sink in 9 feet of water. Had not been raised by end of the year.
Jerome May	United States	The 12-gross register ton motor vessel was stranded at Buttonwoods, Rhode Island. Both people on board survived.

=== 31 May ===
List of shipwrecks: 31 May 1908
Ship	State	Description
Jordan Wooley	United States	The 37-gross register ton schooner foundered in Long Island Sound off the coast of New York. Both people on board survived.
Loanda	United Kingdom	The Elder Dempster 2,702 GRT cargo ship was sunk while travelling from Hamburg to South Africa after hitting the Russian steamer Junona (Russia). The cargo was: Hundreds of cases of gin, rum, champagne and barrels of gunpowder. Thousands of newly minted shillings were presumed aboard but not borne out by manifest.
Phebe	United States	The 6-gross register ton catboat was stranded at Dennis, Massachusetts. Both people on board survived.

== June ==
=== 1 June ===
List of shipwrecks: 1 June 1908
Ship	State	Description
Boothbay	United States	The steamer snagged on her dock on a rising tide causing her to fill and sink at Bath, Maine.
Guide	United States	The steamer had her seams open in strong winds and sank in 10 feet (3.0 m) of water in Albemarle Sound.

=== 3 June ===
List of shipwrecks: 3 June 1908
Ship	State	Description
Blythville	United Kingdom	The 1,325 GRT steamer went ashore on the rocks near the Rhinns of Islay Lighthouse on Orsay in the Inner Hebrides in dense early-morning fog. She subsequently slipped off the rocks and sank in deep water. The ship was on passage from Stornoway for Swansea in ballast.
E. Stearns	United States	With no one on board, the 39-gross register ton sloop foundered at New York City.

=== 6 June ===
List of shipwrecks: 6 June 1908
Ship	State	Description
Tom Dowling	United States	The steamer sank at the Wisconsin Central Railway Ore Dock at Ashland, Wisconsin in 20 feet (6.1 m) of water due to an open seacock. Later raised.
Viva	United States	The 38-gross register ton yacht grounded and sank on the south bar in Absecon Inlet on the coast of New Jersey, a total loss. All four people on board survived.

=== 7 June ===
List of shipwrecks: 7 June 1908
Ship	State	Description
City of Medicine Hat	Canada	City of Medicine Hat The sternwheel paddle steamer sank in the South Saskatchewan River after striking the Traffic Bridge in Saskatoon, Saskatchewan.
Lady Eileen	Canada	The 921 GRT coaster ran ashore in Newport, Baie de Chaleur, on passage Campbellton, New Brunswick for Gaspé, Quebec.
Michael	Greece	The 2,994 GRT steamer collided with the steamer Constanza (Romania) and sank off Lisbon while on passage from Cardiff for Genoa with a cargo of coal.

=== 8 June ===
List of shipwrecks: 8 June 1908
Ship	State	Description
Deer	United States	The 47-gross register ton screw steamer burned in Saginaw Bay off the coast of Michigan. All four people on board survived.

=== 16 June ===
List of shipwrecks: 16 June 1908
Ship	State	Description
Norman	United States	The 365-gross register ton schooner was stranded at L'Archeveque, Nova Scotia. All seven people on board survived.

=== 17 June ===
List of shipwrecks: 17 June 1908
Ship	State	Description
Egga	United Kingdom	The Elder Dempster 1,445 GRT cargo ship carrying cargo from steamship Falaba ran aground on the bar at Lagos, Nigeria. Attempts to refloat the ship failed and she was declared a total wreck.
Friedrich Retzlaff	Germany	The 1,938 GRT freighter foundered 35 nautical miles (65 km) from A Coruña on passage from Huelva to Stettin with a cargo of iron ore.
Ida Schnauer	United States	The 215-gross register ton schooner was stranded on the bar at Tillamook Bay on the coast of Oregon. All seven people on board survived.
Unknown	United States	A house boat capsized, sank, and broke in two when an attempt was made to tow it out of Barnegat Inlet.

=== 20 June ===
List of shipwrecks: 20 June 1908
Ship	State	Description
Cornelius W. Desmond	United States	The 32-gross register ton fishing steamer caught fire and was destroyed at dock in Erie, Pennsylvania when a building adjoining the dock burned down. All 10 people on board survived.
St Lewis	France	The Douarnenez crabber struck the Seven Stones Reef and foundered.
W. J. McCarter	United States	With no one on board, the 18-gross register ton fishing steamer caught fire and was destroyed at dock in Erie, Pennsylvania when a building adjoining the dock burned down.

=== 21 June ===
List of shipwrecks: 21 June 1908
Ship	State	Description
City of Allegan	United States	The motor vessel destroyed by fire over night at dock at Allegan, Michigan. Probable arson where she had not been used for several days.
Kylerea	United Kingdom	The 1,590 GRT freighter on a passage from Tyne to Cannes with a cargo of coal was cut down to below the waterline in collision with the steamer Filinia (Greece) and quickly sank.
O. K.	United States	With no one on board, the 59-gross register ton sternwheel paddle steamer burned on the Missouri River at Fort Benton, Montana.

=== 23 June ===
List of shipwrecks: 23 June 1908
Ship	State	Description
Chippewa	United States	During a voyage from Jacksonville, Florida, to Boston, Massachusetts, carrying general cargo, the 2,696 GRT cargo ship ran aground on the southern shore of Long Island, New York, about three miles (4.8 km) west of Montauk Point Light. She later was refloated on 6 August, repaired, and returned to service.
Petronia	Russia	The 4,847 GRT cargo ship arrived at Aden with her bunkers on fire, and was scuttled in 33 feet (10 m) of water after attempts to extinguish the fire failed. Her No.1, No.2, No.3, and No.4 holds as well as her chart room, bridge, and poop deck were destroyed by fire. The ship was later raised and sold for scrap.

=== 25 June ===
List of shipwrecks: 25 June 1908
Ship	State	Description
Konoura Maru	Japan	The 2,185 GRT freighter ran aground and wrecked near Kinkwazan.
Thomas and Henry	United States	The 31-gross register ton schooner was stranded on Long Point in Maryland. All three people on board survived.

=== 26 June ===
List of shipwrecks: 26 June 1908
Ship	State	Description
City of Allegan	United States	The 18-gross register ton sternwheel motor paddle vessel burned at Allegan, Michigan. All three people on board survived.
Edna B. King	United States	The tug sank at dock at Riley's Dock in Jersey City, New Jersey from a broken condenser pipe. Refloated same day and dry docked.

=== 27 June ===
List of shipwrecks: 27 June 1908
Ship	State	Description
Annie R. Wood	United States	The tow steamer hung up on her dock on a rising tide, filling and sinking at Dyer Street Dock, Providence, Rhode Island. Was raised and back in service before 11 August.

=== 30 June ===
List of shipwrecks: 30 June 1908
Ship	State	Description
O. K.	United States	The steamer was destroyed by fire in the Missouri River at Fort Benton, Montana.

== July ==
=== 1 July ===
List of shipwrecks: 1 July 1908
Ship	State	Description
Beachley	United States	The small steamer was lost at Nome, Alaska.

=== 5 July ===
List of shipwrecks: 5 July 1908
Ship	State	Description
Julia Costa	United States	The 107-gross register ton schooner was lost in a collision with the schooner Miranda (United States) off Highland Light on Cape Cod, Massachusetts. All 20 people on board survived.
Little Fred	United States	The steamer sank at dock in the Monongahela River at Glenwood Landing, Pittsburgh, Pennsylvania, after filling with water through a siphon. Later raised and returned to service.
Minnie R	United States	The 9-gross register ton screw steamer burned at Willow Springs, Illinois. All five people on board survived.

=== 6 July ===
List of shipwrecks: 6 July 1908
Ship	State	Description
Noordwijk	Netherlands	The 2,054 GRT steamer stranded on Tete du Chat on a passage from Santander for Rotterdam with a cargo of iron ore and wrecked.

=== 7 July ===
List of shipwrecks: 7 July 1908
Ship	State	Description
Fulton	United States	The 256-gross register ton schooner barge at Toledo, Ohio. All five people on board survived.

=== 8 July ===
List of shipwrecks: 8 July 1908
Ship	State	Description
Dolphin	United States	The pleasure steamer was destroyed in a general conflagration along the waterfront of East Boston, Massachusetts.
James G. Blaine	United States	The 555-gross register ton schooner barge was stranded in Lake Ontario at Oswego, New York. All seven people on board survived.
L. B. Curtis	United States	With no one on board, the 177-gross register ton barge burned in Boston Harbor off the coast of Massachusetts.
Trader	United States	The 291-gross register ton scow foundered in the Niagara River off Strawberry Island, New York. All four people on board survived.

=== 14 July ===
List of shipwrecks: 14 July 1908
Ship	State	Description
Mentor	United States	The 22-gross register ton screw steamer burned in the lagoon at Jackson Park, Chicago, Illinois, a total loss. All four people on board survived.

=== 17 July ===
List of shipwrecks: 17 July 1908
Ship	State	Description
Frontenac	United States	The 626-gross register ton screw steamer burned at Lorain, Ohio. All 16 people on board survived.

=== 18 July ===
List of shipwrecks: 18 July 1908
Ship	State	Description
Aeon	United Kingdom	The steamer was wrecked in the Pacific Ocean near Christmas Island (now Kiritimati).
Buffalo	United States	The 482-gross register ton sloop barge sprung a leak and sank in Fishers Island Sound 2 nautical miles (3.7 km; 2.3 mi) south of the Cornfield Lightship off the coast of New York. All three people on board survived.
Unknown		A schooner was sunk in a collision with El Norte (United States) 1 1/2 miles (2.4 km) north west of Fort Hamilton. The crew, seeing collision was unavoidable, abandoned ship just before the collision in her boat and were pick up by a tug.

=== 20 July ===
List of shipwrecks: 20 July 1908
Ship	State	Description
Charles A. Street	United States	The 512-gross register ton screw steamer burned in Lake Huron 11 miles above Port Sanilac, Michigan, total loss. All 13 people on board survived.

=== 21 July ===
List of shipwrecks: 21 July 1908
Ship	State	Description
Cap Tarifa	Belgium	Foundered off the Burlings Lighthouse, Portugal.

=== 22 July ===
List of shipwrecks: 22 July 1908
Ship	State	Description
Dodo	United Kingdom	The Elder Dempster 531 GRT cargo ship was stripped and her hull scuttled off Forçados River, Nigeria.
Hagan	United States	The 17-gross register ton tow steamer burned after being struck by lightning and beached at Bridesburg, Pennsylvania. All four people on board jumped overboard after beaching.
Menawa	United States	The 211-gross register ton schooner was lost in a collision with the presidential yacht USS Mayflower (United States Navy) in Long Island Sound. All six people on board survived.

=== 23 July ===
List of shipwrecks: 23 July 1908
Ship	State	Description
Don Matias	Chile	The 2,213 GRT steamer, on a passage from Tocopilla for Lota with a cargo of copper ore, foundered almost immediately after being run down by the cargo-passenger ship Victoria (United Kingdom) in dense fog in Bay of Arauco.
José Olaverri	United States	The 661-gross register ton schooner was stranded on Bull Island on the coast of South Carolina. All eight people on board survived.
Mabel W	United States	The 178-gross register ton motor yacht was lost in a collision with the screw steamer George N. Orr (United States) off Chicago, Illinois. All three people on board survived.

=== 24 July ===
List of shipwrecks: 24 july 1908
Ship	State	Description
Auberndale	United States	The 663-gross register ton barkentine departed the Turks Islands in the Caribbean bound for Philadelphia, Pennsylvania, with 10 people on board and was never heard from again.
Charles Woolsey	United States	The schooner was sunk in a collision with Maine (United States) in dense fog between New York and New Bedford, Massachusetts. Crew rescued by Maine.
Governor Safford	United States	The 307-gross register ton sidewheel paddle steamer foundered from flooding in high seas off Bogue Inlet, North Carolina in 7 fathoms (42 ft; 13 m) of water. All ten people on board abandoned ship in her boat and were rescued by her tow vessel Katahdin (United States).
W. M. Gladden	United States	The steamer sank in the Arkansas River near Martins Landing when a dropping river lever caused her guard to snag on the shore causing a list. Later raised.

=== 25 July ===
List of shipwrecks: 25 July 1908
Ship	State	Description
Charley Woolsey	United States	The 207-gross register ton schooner was lost in a collision with the screw steamer Maine (United States) off Cornfield Light on the coast of Connecticut. All five people on board survived.

=== 26 July ===
List of shipwrecks: 26 July 1908
Ship	State	Description
E. S. Booth	United States	The tug struck Salt Rock in the harbor of Stamford, Connecticut filling and sinking. Raised and taken to New York.
Neva	United States	The 71-gross register ton sternwheel paddle steamer destroyed by fire when a lamp exploded on the Ohio River at Wheeling, West Virginia, or at Buffalo, West Virginia on the Great Kanawha River. All 12 people on board survived.

=== 27 July ===
List of shipwrecks: 27 July 1908
Ship	State	Description
Sandal	United Kingdom	The steamer was wrecked on Cross Island (Sosnovets Island) off Russian Lapland.

=== 28 July ===
List of shipwrecks: 28 July 1909
Ship	State	Description
Lady Antrim	United States	The 11-gross register ton schooner foundered in South Creek in North Carolina. Both people on board survived.

=== 29 July ===
List of shipwrecks: 29 July 1908
Ship	State	Description
Epoch	United States	With no one on board, the 13-gross register ton yawl burned at Blaine, Washington.

=== 30 July ===
List of shipwrecks: 30 July 1908
Ship	State	Description
Restless	United States	The 7-gross register ton sloop-rigged yacht foundered in the Rocky River in Ohio. All three people on board survived.
West Wind	United States	The Launch was sunk in Maumee Bay in a collision with Greyhound (United States) when she struck the steamer and was caught in her paddle wheel. One killed, five were rescued by the steamer.

=== 31 July ===
List of shipwrecks: 31 July 1908
Ship	State	Description
Enterprise	United States	The 40-gross register ton screw steamer burned at Milton, Florida. All 15 people on board survived.
Mareeba	Australia	The 1,747 GRT steamer, on a passage from Brisbane for Newcastle with a cargo of general goods, sugar and wood ran aground 10 miles (16 km) north of Stockton. During the night of 3 August she was broken by gale.
Nettie Allison	United States	The bugeye was sunk in a collision with a lighter in the Norfolk, Virginia area. crew rescued by the tug Lauretta Spedding (United States) that had been towing the lighter.

== August ==
=== 1 August ===
List of shipwrecks: 1 August 1908
Ship	State	Description
Siesta	United States	With no one on board, the 10-gross register ton motor vessel burned at Patchogue, Long Island, New York.

=== 4 August ===
List of shipwrecks: 4 August 1908
Ship	State	Description
Ella B.	United States	The steamer sank at dock in the Monongahela River at Dravosburg, Pennsylvania after filling with water. Later raised and returned to service.
Illinois	United States	The fire steamer was sunk in the Chicago River at an elevator fire when the building at the foot of Sixteenth Street collapsed on her. Refloated, repaired and returned to service.
Maria	United States	The 7-gross register ton sloop was scuttled off Aguadilla, Puerto Rico. All three people on board abandoned ship safely before she sank.

=== 5 August ===
List of shipwrecks: 5 August 1908
Ship	State	Description
Harford	United States	The tow steamer sank in the Delaware River near Tullytown, Pennsylvania. Raised the same day.
Kirkwall	United Kingdom	The 2,582 GRT steamer, on a passage from Huelva for Hamburg with a cargo of iron ore, was run down late at night by an unknown barque off Ameland and sunk.

=== 7 August ===
List of shipwrecks: 7 August 1908
Ship	State	Description
Three Sisters	United States	The 302-gross register ton schooner was stranded on Baker Island at the southwestern entrance to Frenchman Bay on the coast of Maine. All six people on board survived.
Zwyndrecht	Netherlands	The 2,090 GRT steamer, on a passage from Havana for London with a cargo of molasses, sprang a leak and foundered in the position 38°32′N 38°32′W. 27 members of the crew including the captain were saved by Italian barque Silver Stream and landed in London on 23 August.

=== 8 August ===
List of shipwrecks: 8 August 1908
Ship	State	Description
Maggie and May	United States	The 122-gross register ton schooner was lost in a collision with the screw steamer Frega (Germany) off LaHave, Nova Scotia. Nine of the 13 people on board lost their lives.

=== 9 August ===
List of shipwrecks: 9 August 1908
Ship	State	Description
Columbia	United States	The 92-gross register ton sternwheel paddle steamer burned at New Orleans, Louisiana. The only person on board survived.

=== 11 August ===
List of shipwrecks: 11 August 1908
Ship	State	Description
Annie R. Wood	United States	The 25-gross register ton screw steamer caught fire on the Taunton River in Massachusetts and was beached, a total loss. All four people on board swam to shore.
Titania	United States	The 73-gross register ton iron-hulled screw steamer was lost in a collision with the screw steamer Kingston (United Kingdom) off Charlotte, Rochester, New York. All 26 people on board survived.

=== 12 August ===
List of shipwrecks: 12 August 1908
Ship	State	Description
Frankie	United States	The barge struck a submerged object at a wharf at Reedy Island and was beached to prevent sinking.

=== 13 August ===
List of shipwrecks: 13 August 1908
Ship	State	Description
Guyandotte	United States	The out of commission 43-gross register ton sidewheel paddle steamer burned to the waterline on the Ohio River at Catlettsburg, Kentucky.
Nereo	Austria-Hungary	The 3,739 GRT steamer, on a passage from South Shields for Trieste with a cargo of coal, went ashore on Keller Rock off Ushant. An attempt to refloat her failed, and the ship sank in deep water.

=== 14 August ===
List of shipwrecks: 14 August 1908
Ship	State	Description
Caesar	United States	The 10-gross register ton, 36-foot (11.0 m) fishing vessel struck a rock and was wrecked at Port Frederick (58°13′N 135°30′W) in Icy Strait in the Alexander Archipelago in Southeast Alaska. Her crew of three survived. She later was salvaged and returned to service.
Columbia	United States	The laid up steamer burned in New Basin, New Orleans, Louisiana, a total loss.
John Fothergill	United Kingdom	The 2,730 GRT steamer, on a passage from Poti, Russia, for Garston, Liverpool, England, with a cargo of iron ore, was run down by the steamer Oural (Belgium) in the Bosporous off Kavak Point in the Ottoman Empire, and sunk.
Natalie	United States	The yacht was sunk in a collision with the steamship Haida (United States) off Erie Basin, Brooklyn. The crew was saved without loss.

=== 15 August ===
List of shipwrecks: 15 August 1908
Ship	State	Description
Beby	Greece	The 2,052 GRT steamer, on a passage from Piraeus for Marmora in ballast ran aground on Psara and subsequently sunk in deep water.

=== 16 August ===
List of shipwrecks: 4 April 1908
Ship	State	Description
Acme	United States	The 36-gross register ton screw steamer burned in Puget Sound off the coast of Washington. All four people on board survived.
Belmont	United States	The 29-gross register ton sternwheel paddle steamer foundered in the Wabash River in Indiana. All six people on board survived.

=== 17 August ===
List of shipwrecks: 17 August 1908
Ship	State	Description
Aberdeen	United States	The steamer struck bottom on the Humboldt Bay Bar four times in thick fog and was beached because of the resulting leaks.
J. T. Hatfield	United States	The steamer struck a rock and sank in the Ohio River at Eightmile Island, West Virginia. Immediately raised and taken for repairs.

=== 18 August ===
List of shipwrecks: 18 August 1908
Ship	State	Description
Sarah Smith	United States	The 45-gross register ton screw steamer burned to the waterline off Minnesota Point in the harbor of Duluth, Minnesota, a total loss. All six people on board survived.

=== 19 August ===
List of shipwrecks: 19 August 1908
Ship	State	Description
Lucile	United States	Carrying either 150 people — 80 Japanese cannery workers as passengers and a crew of 70 — or 160 people (sources disagree) and a cargo of 1,557 tons of canned and salted salmon, the 1,402-gross register ton, 200-foot (61.0 m) full-rigged ship was wrecked without loss of life on a spit at the entrance to the Ugashik River on the Bristol Bay coast of the District of Alaska after her moorings were carried away in high winds.

=== 20 August ===
List of shipwrecks: 20 August 1908
Ship	State	Description
Adiramled	United States	The steamer sprung a leak off Little Traverse Point in Lake Michigan. She returned to her dock at Harbor Springs, Michigan where she sank.
H. P. Barnes	United States	The 39-gross register ton schooner foundered in Eastern Bay off the Chesapeake Bay on the coast of Maryland . All three people on board survived.
Henry Wolcott	United States	The 49-gross register ton schooner foundered off Brooklyn, New York. All three people on board survived.
Jessie Martin	United States	The 42-gross register ton schooner was stranded at Ludlington, Michigan. Both people on board survived.

=== 22 August ===
List of shipwrecks: 22 August 1908
Ship	State	Description
Lee White	United States	The 49-gross register ton steam catamaran burned at dock on the Arkansas River at Lewisburg, Arkansas while being repaired, a total loss. All 13 people on board survived.

=== 23 August ===
List of shipwrecks: 23 August 1908
Ship	State	Description
Oregon	United States	The 779-gross register ton screw steamer was stranded and wrecked on Dymont Shoals in Georgian Bay near Thessalon, Ontario, Canada, she then caught fire and was destroyed. All 13 people on board survived.
Waneka	United States	With no one on board, the 22-gross register ton motor yacht burned on the St. Clair Flats in Michigan.

=== 24 August ===
List of shipwrecks: 24 August 1908
Ship	State	Description
Margaret H. Vane	United States	The 246-gross register ton schooner was stranded on Cobb Island in the Virginia Barrier Islands on the coast of Virginia. All six people on board survived.

=== 26 August ===
List of shipwrecks: 19 August 1908
Ship	State	Description
Ariana	France	The schooner was sunk in a collision with trawler "Thrush" (United Kingdom) off the west coast of Ireland. Thrush picked up her crew.
Dunearn	United Kingdom	While sailing through the Korea Strait near the Gotō Islands during a typhoon, the 3,142-gross register ton ship sank with the loss of 51 of 53 crew members.
Mosetta H	United States	The 5-gross register ton sloop was stranded at Saugatuck, Connecticut. The only person on board survived.
Syracuse	United States	The 85-gross register ton screw steamer was stranded in the harbor at Maumee, Ohio. All four people on board survived. Or the dredge struck submerged piles causing heavy damage in Swan Creek, Toledo, Ohio, a total loss.

=== 27 August ===
List of shipwrecks: 27 August 1908
Ship	State	Description
Crystal	United States	The 12-gross register ton motor vessel was stranded in Boston Harbor on the coast of Massachusetts. Both people on board survived.
Fort George	United States	During a voyage from New York City to Honolulu, Hawaii, with 20 people on board, the 1,769-gross register ton iron-hulled full-rigged ship reported for the last time. She was never heard from again.
S.C. Baldwin	United States	Loaded with a cargo of 693 short tons (619 long tons; 629 t) of stone and under tow by the tug Torrent (United States), the 160-foot (49 m), 412.54-gross register ton barge capsized and sank in Lake Michigan off Twin River Point, Wisconsin, during a southbound voyage from Sturgeon Bay, Wisconsin, with the loss of one life. There were two survivors. Her wreck was discovered in the mid-1970s. It lies at 44°10.873′N 087°29.179′W in 75 feet (23 m) of water, with its stem post rising 30 feet (9.1 m) from the bottom. It was included within the boundaries of the Wisconsin Shipwreck Coast National Marine Sanctuary in 2021.

=== 28 August ===
List of shipwrecks: 28 August 1908
Ship	State	Description
Penguin	United States	The out of commission 60-gross register ton sternwheel paddle steamer caught fire and was destroyed while lying on the bank on the Ohio River at Evansville, Indiana. Both people on board survived.

=== 29 August ===
List of shipwrecks: 29 August 1908
Ship	State	Description
Gen. G. Mott	United States	The tow steamer sank at dock in Christiana Creek, Wilmington, Delaware, possibly snagged on dock on a rising tide. The vessel was raised and placed on the dock.
Lycourgos	Greece	The 218 GRT steamer sank off Port Vathy, Samos.
Mount Lebanon	United Kingdom	The 2,420 GRT steamer on passage from Glasgow for Alexandria with coal and a general cargo sprang a leak during a heavy gale and sank four hours later approximately 70 miles (110 km) west of Scilly.
Two States	United States	The steamer struck a sunken lighter and sank at Augusta, Georgia. Raised and repaired.

== September ==
=== 1 September ===
List of shipwrecks: 1 September 1908
Ship	State	Description
Amazon	United Kingdom	Amazon The ship was driven ashore and wrecked west of Port Talbot, Glamorgan, Wales, with the loss of twenty of her 28 crew. She was on a voyage from Port Talbot to Iquique, Chile.
Ivy	United States	The 135-ton or 142-gross register ton (sources disagree),102.5-foot (31.2 m) schooner was driven ashore by ice at Point Barrow, Alaska, while at anchor and was abandoned. Her crew of seven survived.
Seven Sisters	United States	Carrying a cargo of coal with 175 tons in her hold and 25 tons on deck, the 129-gross register ton, 97-foot (30 m) schooner was wrecked in a gale 5 nautical miles (9.3 km) east of Cape Espenberg on the Chukchi Sea coast of the District of Alaska after she dragged her anchor and her steering gear was carried away. All nine members of her crew survived.
Verajean	United Kingdom	The full-rigged ship on passage from Cardiff to Mollendo was driven ashore and wrecked at Rhoose Point, Glamorgan, Wales, during "The Great Storm of 1908". Her crew were rescued. She was refloated and towed to Porthkerry harbor, and later taken in to Barry, Glamorgan, but was declared a total loss and sold for scrap in November 1908.

=== 2 September ===
List of shipwrecks: 2 September 1908
Ship	State	Description
Heck	United States	The steamer struck a log and sank in 15 feet (4.6 m) of water in Peter's Creek off the St. Johns River. Raised and repaired.
Thomas Chubb	United States	The tug was destroyed by fire between Albany, New York and Troy, New York.

=== 3 September ===
List of shipwrecks: 3 September 1908
Ship	State	Description
Lina	United States	The 31-gross register ton screw steamer dragged her anchor in a gale, hit a pier, and sank in 8 feet (2.4 m) of water at Lewes, Delaware. She had not been raised as of the end of 1908. Both people on board survived.
Patrick McCabe	United States	The 35-gross register ton schooner was lost in a collision with a barge towed by the screw steamer Concord (United States) 15 nautical miles (28 km; 17 mi) southeast of Winter Quarter Shoal off the coast of Virginia. All four people on board survived and boarded the barge.
Wm. H. Yerkes, Jr.	United States	The tug struck the wreck of schooner E. G. Erwin (United States) off Point Lookout Bar. She made it to dock at Point Lookout where she filled and sank. Pumped out the next day and taken to Alexandria, Virginia.

=== 4 September ===
List of shipwrecks: 4 September 1908
Ship	State	Description
Bessie	United States	The 185-gross register ton screw steamer burned on the Hudson River at Verplanck, New York. All six people on board survived.

=== 5 September ===
List of shipwrecks: 5 September 1908
Ship	State	Description
Bennington	United States	The 250-gross register ton barge foundered off Whitefish Point on the coast of Michigan. Both people on board lost their lives.
John McDermott	United States	The 564-gross register ton brig departed New York City bound for Fajardo, Puerto Rico, with seven people on board and was never heard from again.
Uncle Paul	United States	With no one on board, the 67-gross register ton barge foundered in the Saint Lawrence River off New York's Fox Island in the Thousand Islands.

=== 6 September ===
List of shipwrecks: 6 September 1908
Ship	State	Description
Chauncy Hurlbut	United States	The 1,009-gross register ton screw steamer sprung a leak and was beached 10 miles (16 km) west of Whitefish Point on the coast of Michigan and broke up, a total loss. All 14 people on board survived.
Wonder	United States	The 99-gross register ton screw steamer Dredge was stranded at Ashtabula, Ohio. All four people on board survived. Refloated on 12 September and sank in 22 feet (6.7 m) of water in a slip at Ashtabula, Ohio.

=== 9 September ===
List of shipwrecks: 9 September 1908
Ship	State	Description
Pacific	United Kingdom	The 2,919 GRT steamer, on passage from Sunderland to Buenos Aires with a cargo of coal, ran aground on Outer Dowsing Shoal and sank at 9:00. Eighteen of the crew were landed in Grimsby by Limewold (flag unknown), one crew member was killed, and four were missing.

=== 11 September ===
List of shipwrecks: 11 September 1908
Ship	State	Description
Tennessee	United States	The 374-gross register ton sternwheel paddle steamer was lost when she struck a snag at Kansas City, Missouri. All 34 people on board survived.

=== 13 September ===
List of shipwrecks: 13 September 1908
Ship	State	Description
Old Dominion	United States	The 13-gross register ton motor vessel exploded and burned off Gay Head on the coast of Massachusetts. All five people on board survived.

=== 14 September ===
List of shipwrecks: 14 September 1908
Ship	State	Description
Mary B. Judge	United States	The 472-gross register ton schooner was abandoned in the Atlantic Ocean at 26°18′N 71°00′W with the loss of one life. There were six survivors.
N. B. Starbuck	United States	The tug caught fire at dock at Long Island City, New York. The fire was put out by the fireboat David A. Boody ((United States)) of the New York City Fire Department, whose water probably caused her to sink. Later raised and repaired.

=== 15 September ===
List of shipwrecks: 15 September 1908
Ship	State	Description
Annie C	United States	The 9-gross register ton motor vessel was stranded at Kissimmee, Florida. Both people on board survived.
Beulah McCabe	United States	The 691-gross register ton schooner foundered in the Bahamas during a hurricane with the loss of seven lives. There was one survivor.
Frederica	United States	The 56-gross register ton schooner foundered in Delaware Bay. All three people on board survived.
John A. Matheson	United States	The 154-gross register ton schooner was abandoned in the Atlantic Ocean at 26°26′N 070°05′W. All eight people on board survived.
Robert Palmer	United States	The auxiliary sloop burned in Fishers Sound due to a gasoline explosion, a total loss. The crew of three left in the ship's boat.

=== 16 September ===
List of shipwrecks: 16 September 1908
Ship	State	Description
E. F. Keene	United States	The 32-gross register ton schooner was stranded in the Patuxent River in Maryland. Both people on board survived.
Rosella	United Kingdom	The 1,305 GRT steamer on a voyage from Penarth to Granville, Manche carrying a cargo of coal struck Roches Douvres Rocks, 15 nautical miles (28 km) from La Corbière, Jersey Channel Islands at 06:10 and subsequently sunk at 08:30.

=== 17 September ===
List of shipwrecks: 17 September 1908
Ship	State	Description
Granger	United States	The 58-gross register ton schooner foundered off San Mateo Beach, California. The only person on board survived.

=== 18 September ===
List of shipwrecks: 18 September 1908
Ship	State	Description
Olga	United States	While under charter to support the salvage of the wrecked steamer Saratoga (United States) on the southwest end of Busby Island (60°53′30″N 146°42′00″W) in Prince William Sound on the south-central coast of the District of Alaska, the 21-gross register ton, 47-foot (14.3 m) schooner's mooring to Saratoga broke while no one was on board. The wind blew Olga across Valdez Arm, and she was wrecked on the west side of Valdez Arm near Point Fremantle (60°57′N 146°58′W).

=== 19 September ===
List of shipwrecks: 19 September 1908
Ship	State	Description
Holiday	United States	With no one on board, the 10-gross register ton motor vessel burned at Holland, Michigan, on the coast of Lake Michigan.
Magnet	United States	The freight boat was damaged in a collision with the tug Bee ((United States)) in the East River off Catherine Street in New York City, and was towed by Bee to Court Street, Brooklyn, where she sank. Raised the next day and repaired.
William Maxwell	United States	William Maxwell The 43-gross register ton wooden motor fishing tug was stranded on a reef in Lake Huron off Thunder Bay Island off the coast of Michigan and became a total loss. All seven people on board survived. Her wreck lies in 12 feet (3.7 m) of water at 45.033167°N 83.19155°W.

=== 20 September ===
List of shipwrecks: 20 September 1908
Ship	State	Description
Star of Bengal	United States	Star of Bengal During a voyage under tow from Wrangell, Alaska, to San Francisco, California, carrying 137 people — 110 Chinese cannery workers, seven other passengers, and a crew of 20 — and a cargo of 1,800 tons of canned salmon and machinery, the 1,877-gross register ton, 262.8-foot (80.1 m) iron-hulled bark was wrecked in a Gale on Coronation Island in Southeast Alaska 0.5 nautical miles (0.93 km) north of Helm Point (55°49′30″N 134°17′00″W) with the loss of 112 lives.

=== 21 September ===
List of shipwrecks: 21 September 1908
Ship	State	Description
Ariel	United States	The 54-gross register ton sloop burned at New York City. Both people on board survived.
Cornell	United States	The tug sank overnight at Pier 39 in the North River. Raised and repaired.
Ingleside	United States	The steamer burned while lying on the bank near Caseyville, Kentucky.
Thomas Chubb	United States	The 34-gross register ton screw steamer burned at Race Course Island in New York. All three people on board survived.

=== 23 September ===
List of shipwrecks: 23 September 1908
Ship	State	Description
Cheehegan	United States	The schooner struck a rock and sank off Napatree Point off Newport, Rhode Island.
USS Yankee	United States Navy	The training ship ran aground on Spindle Rock near Hen and Chickens lightship. She remained there until refloated on 4 December, but she sank later that day.

=== 25 September ===
List of shipwrecks: 25 September 1908
Ship	State	Description
DeVaux Powel	United States	The tug suffered steering failure in Governor's Island Gap and ran aground and sank. Raised and repaired.

=== 26 September ===
List of shipwrecks: 26 September 1908
Ship	State	Description
Volund	Norway	The 239-foot (72.8 m), 1,600-gross register ton cargo ship sank in 95 to 105 feet (29 to 32 m) of water after colliding at night in dense fog with the Fall River Line passenger steamer Commonwealth (United States) off Race Rock off eastern Long Island, New York, off the west end of Fisher's Island between Fisher′s Island and Plum Island at 41°13.288′N 072°03.328′W. Commonwealth rescued all 16 people on board Volund – her master, his wife, and 14 crewmen.

=== 27 September ===
List of shipwrecks: 27 September 1908
Ship	State	Description
Neshoto	United States	The 2,255-gross register ton screw steamer was wrecked in poor visibility due to smoke from forest fires in Lake Superior at Crisp Point on the coast of Michigan. Later broke up in a gale. All 16 people on board survived.
Oleg	Imperial Russian Navy	The Bogatyr-class cruiser ran aground off Kronstadt. She was refloated on 4 October with assistance from the tugs Forwards, Meteor and Vladimir (all Russia) and taken in to Kronstadt for repairs.
Race Horse	United States	The 105-gross register ton schooner was stranded in Casco Bay on the coast of Maine. All four people on board survived.
Sir John Jackson	United Kingdom	The 4,231 GRT steamer on a passage from Saigon for the continent with a cargo of rice and maize ran aground on Brennus Shoal (Ceylon) and got holed in the forepeak. Attempts to lighten and refloat her failed due to stormy weather and she was abandoned as a total loss on 9 October 1908.

=== 28 September ===
List of shipwrecks: 28 September 1908
Ship	State	Description
Frontenac	United States	The steamer stranded on Parisian Island in Whitefish Bay and sank.
Lyman C. Smith	United States	The steamer collided with the south pier abutment and sank while attempting to enter the Canadian Canal at Sault Ste. Marie, Ontario.

=== 29 September ===
List of shipwrecks: 29 September 1908
Ship	State	Description
Ida	United States	The 169-gross register ton schooner capsized off Frankfort, Michigan. All six people on board survived.

=== 30 September ===
List of shipwrecks: 30 September 1908
Ship	State	Description
E. Waterman	United States	The 107-gross register ton schooner was stranded at St. Stephen, New Brunswick. All five people on board survived.

== October ==
=== 1 October ===
List of shipwrecks: 1 October 1908
Ship	State	Description
Rob Roy	United States	The 17-gross register ton schooner was stranded on the coast of Oahu in the Territory of Hawaii. All three people on board survived.

=== 2 October ===
List of shipwrecks: 2 October 1908
Ship	State	Description
Brandon	United States	The steamer struck an obstruction on the Tillamook, Oregon Bar and was beached on mud flats in Tillamook Bay in water logged condition because of the resulting leaks.
May Flower	United States	The 84-gross register ton motor vessel was abandoned in the Atlantic Ocean 230 nautical miles (430 km; 260 mi) north of Watling's Island in the Bahamas. All 12 people on board survived.
Tempest	United States	The tug burned to the water's edge, capsized and sank at Vicksburg, Mississippi.

=== 3 October ===
List of shipwrecks: 3 October 1908
Ship	State	Description
Alamo	United States	The 10-gross register ton Tug burned at the Shell Bank off the coast of Nueces County, Texas, or in the Sabine River, a total loss. All five people on board survived.
Emerson	United States	The 192-gross register ton sternwheel paddle steamer was lost in a collision with an unnamed Corps of Engineers barge ( United States Army), or a mattress secured with a cable that snagged her wheel causing her to capsize and sink on the Mississippi River off Osceola, Arkansas, a total loss. A musician on board died, eight others survived.
George Sturges	United States	The 439-gross register ton schooner was abandoned at sea in the Magdalen Islands in the Gulf of St. Lawrence off the coast of Canada. All nine people on board survived.
J. H. G. Perkins	United States	The 59-gross register ton schooner was stranded on Goat Island off Cape Porpoise on the coast of Maine. Both people on board survived.
Redwing	United States	The 19-gross register ton screw steamer burned at Brunswick, Georgia. All four people on board survived.

=== 4 October ===
List of shipwrecks: 4 October 1908
Ship	State	Description
Alice Marie	France	The steel barque hit the Runnelstone, drifted and sank in Mount's Bay, Cornwall, where it is now a dive site.
Amethyst	United Kingdom	The 552 GRT steamer collided early morning in dense fog with cargo ship Daisy (flag unknown) off Wicklow Head and sunk almost immediately. Her crew was saved by Daisy and landed in Dublin on 5 October 1908.

=== 5 October ===
List of shipwrecks: 5 October 1908
Ship	State	Description
Mary D	United States	With no one on board, the 40-gross register ton sternwheel paddle steamer foundered in the Grand River in Oklahoma.

=== 7 October ===
List of shipwrecks: 7 October 1908
Ship	State	Description
Lambert	Germany	The 5,967 GRT steamer on passage from Chile to Bremen with general cargo caught fire and was destroyed off Río Negro. The captain, 43 crew members and 2 passengers were saved and landed at Punta Rubio.

=== 9 October ===
List of shipwrecks: 9 October 1908
Ship	State	Description
Ida	United States	The 11-gross register ton schooner burned in Santa Rosa Sound on the coast of Florida. All three people on board survived.
Nipponia	Germany	The liner Pretoria collided with the 3,066-gross register ton cargo steamship in the North Sea off Texel in the Netherlands. Nipponia sank with the loss of her captain and 12 members of her crew.

=== 12 October ===
List of shipwrecks: 12 October 1908
Ship	State	Description
Stork	United Kingdom	The steamer was wrecked on Lisbon Shoals in Hudson Bay in severe weather and ice.

=== 14 October ===
List of shipwrecks: 14 October 1908
Ship	State	Description
Egon	United States	The steamer struck a hidden obstruction and sank in the Mississippi River near Bird's Point, Missouri. Raised and repaired.
Sacramento	United States	The steamer was sunk in a collision with Mataafa (United States) in the harbor at Duluth, Minnesota; raised, but sank again by 1 November; again raised and declared unseaworthy.
W. B. Keen	United States	The 30-gross register ton schooner was stranded on Milk Island in Massachusetts. All six people on board survived.

=== 15 October ===
List of shipwrecks: 15 October 1908
Ship	State	Description
Victorine	United States	The 9-gross register ton schooner was stranded at Aransas Pass, Texas. The only person on board survived.

=== 17 October ===
List of shipwrecks: 17 October 1908
Ship	State	Description
Velasquez	United Kingdom	The Lamport and Holt Line 7,452 GRT cargo passenger ship on a passage from New York to Buenos Aires with a cargo of coffee, post and passengers entered an area of intense fog soon after leaving Santos harbor, and eventually hit the rocks at Ponta da Sela (Ilhabela) suffering serious damage. All passengers and crew managed to leave the ship and took shelter on a nearby beach (Praia do Veloso) being rescued the day after by another vessel.

=== 18 October ===
List of shipwrecks: 18 October 1908
Ship	State	Description
Clyde	United States	The launch sank in Hay Lake, St. Marys River. One crewman killed.

=== 19 October ===
List of shipwrecks: 19 October 1908
Ship	State	Description
Isle of Erin	United Kingdom	The iron barque foundered off North Ronaldsay, Orkney Islands on a voyage with coal from Sunderland, England for Montevideo, Uruguay, with the loss of all 17 on board.
Lizzie A. Law	United States	The 747-gross register ton schooner barge was stranded in Lake Superior at Huron Island off the coast of Michigan. All seven people on board survived.
Mary Me (or Mary Mc.)	United States	The out of commission 22-gross register ton sternwheel paddle steamer burned in the Mississippi River at St. Louis, Missouri, a total loss. Both people on board survived.

=== 20 October ===
List of shipwrecks: 20 October 1908
Ship	State	Description
Love Point	United States	The 1,974-gross register ton steel-hulled sidewheel paddle steamer burned on the Hudson River off Newburgh, New York, killing four of the 52 people on board.
New York	United States	The passenger steamer was destroyed by fire at the T. S. Marvel & Co. shipyard, Newburgh, New York. Four killed.

=== 21 October ===
List of shipwrecks: 21 October 1908
Ship	State	Description
Dessoug	United States	The 1,382-gross register ton iron-hulled schooner barge foundered in the Atlantic Ocean off the coast of Virginia 17 nautical miles (31 km; 20 mi) northeast of Winter Quarter Shoal. All four people on board survived.

=== 22 October ===
List of shipwrecks: 22 October 1908
Ship	State	Description
Cramligton	United Kingdom	The 1,824 GRT steamer on a passage from Newcastle for Seville with a cargo of coal and coke collided early morning with cargo ship Cadeby (flag unknown) in the mouth of the Humber. The vessel was struck near amidships and began to fill almost immediately. She was beached on Sand Hale Flat to prevent the sinking but later had broken in two amidships and was declared a total loss.

=== 23 October ===
List of shipwrecks: 23 October 1908
Ship	State	Description
Flora Rogers	United States	The 376-gross register ton schooner was stranded on Bodie Island on the coast of North Carolina. All seven people on board survived.
Peshtigo	United States	The 817-gross register ton screw steamer was stranded in Lake Huron on Mackinac Island off the coast of Michigan. All 12 people on board survived.

=== 24 October ===
List of shipwrecks: 24 October 1908
Ship	State	Description
Daniel B. Meacham	United States	The steamer struck a reef north west of the Keweenaw Peninsula, 12 miles (19 km) east of the Great Lakes Ship Canal in Lake Superior. Raised, repaired and returned to service.
Hunter No. 2	United States	The steamer struck a submerged piling and sank while landing at the dock at the foot of Fifty-First Street Pittsburgh, Pennsylvania, in the Allegheny River. Later raised and returned to service.
Mary D.	United States	The steamer was tied to the bank in the Arkansas River near the mouth of the Grand River when a rapidly rising river caused the bank to cave resulting in trees cutting her in two, a total loss.

=== 26 October ===
List of shipwrecks: 26 October 1908
Ship	State	Description
Elena	United States	The 67-gross register ton schooner was stranded at Media Luna, Toa Baja, Puerto Rico. All nine people on board survived.
Samuel Gedney	United States	The steamer burned to the waterline at dock at the River and Harbor Improvement Company, Camden, New Jersey.

=== 27 October ===
List of shipwrecks: 27 October 1908
Ship	State	Description
Enterprise	United Kingdom	The brigantine, on a voyage from Hartlepool to the Thames with coal, was struck by the passenger-cargo steamer Derwent (United Kingdom) in the Haisborough Sands off the coast of Norfolk, England, and sank with the loss of five of her crew of six.
Yarmouth	United Kingdom	The cargo ship foundered in the North Sea off the Outer Gabbard Lightship with the loss of all 22 people on board. She was on a voyage from Rotterdam and Hook of Holland, Netherlands to Harwich, Essex.

=== 28 October ===
List of shipwrecks: 28 October 1908
Ship	State	Description
Girnigoe	United Kingdom	The 321 GRT steamer on a passage from Cherbourg for Poole with a cargo of stone ran into heavy seas mid-Channel which shifted her cargo. The vessel had to be abandoned and she foundered around 04:30. The crew was saved by the schooner Malpas Belle and landed in Falmouth.

=== 29 October ===
List of shipwrecks: 29 October 1908
Ship	State	Description
Charles S. Hirsch	United States	The 620-gross register ton schooner was stranded at Paul Gamiels Hill, North Carolina, with the loss of two lives. There were six survivors.
Saint Andre	France	The 1,121 GRT steamer on a passage from Caen for Grangemouth with a cargo of iron ore ran aground off Farne Islands in the early morning and subsequently broke up and became a total wreck.

=== 30 October ===
List of shipwrecks: 30 October 1908
Ship	State	Description
Comus	United States	After departing Skagway, Alaska, the 5-gross register ton, 30-foot (9.1 m) schooner was wrecked in Lynn Canal near Berners Bay in Southeast Alaska. The only person on board survived.
H. A. Harvey, jr.	United States	The 59-gross register ton sternwheel paddle steamer, or Tug, burned at Prophet Island, Louisiana, total loss. All seven people on board survived.
Hartford and New York No. 76	United States	The barge sprung a leak in a heavy blow off New Haven, Connecticut and brought into the harbor, filling and sinking in 3 1/2 fathoms (21 ft; 6.4 m) of water.
Hawea	United Kingdom	Hawea The steamship was stranded when struck by heavy wave and losing steering way, while entering Greymouth, New Zealand.
John M. Brown	United States	The 452-gross register ton schooner was abandoned in the Atlantic Ocean east of Virginia at 37°N 071°W. All seven people on board survived.
Taif	Ottoman Empire	The steamer sank after a collision with the steamer Bagdad (flag unknown) off Seraglio Point, Constantinople, Ottoman Empire. This ship was originally named Tycho Brahe. In 1891 ownership transferred to Charles Deville Wells, (known as 'the man who broke the bank at Monte Carlo'), who renamed the vessel Palais Royal. After Wells was declared bankrupt in 1893 it was sold to a Turkish owner.

=== 31 October ===
List of shipwrecks: 31 October 1908
Ship	State	Description
Arleville H. Perry	United States	The 311-gross register ton schooner was stranded on False Cape on the coast of Virginia. All six people on board survived.
Frank Barnet	United States	The 853-gross register ton schooner burned in the Atlantic Ocean at 38°20′N 069°40′W. All eight people on board survived.
Lulie L. Pollard	United States	The 541-gross register ton schooner burned in the Atlantic Ocean east of North Carolina at 35°39′N 074°10′W. All seven people on board survived.
Redwing	United States	The steamer burned and sank at her dock at Brunswick, Georgia.

=== Unknown date ===
List of shipwrecks: Unknown date October 1908
Ship	State	Description
Centennial	United States	With no one on board, the 10-gross register ton schooner sank in the harbor at Lynn, Massachusetts.
Neustria	France	The passenger ship disappeared without trace after departing New York City on 27 October bound for Marseille, France. There were no passengers aboard, but all 38 crew members were lost.

== November ==
=== 1 November ===
List of shipwrecks: 1 November 1908
Ship	State	Description
Donca	United States	The out of commission steamer sprang a leak and sank while lying on the bank at Broadway Hollow opposite Madison, Indiana in the Ohio River. Later raised.

=== 2 November ===
List of shipwrecks: 2 November 1908
Ship	State	Description
Eliza Ellen	United States	The 13-gross register ton schooner was stranded in Blue Hill Bay on the coast of Maine. Both people on board survived.

=== 3 November ===
List of shipwrecks: 3 November 1908
Ship	State	Description
Henry L. Walt	United States	The 39-gross register ton tug caught fire off Whitestone Point. The fire spread rapidly, and her crew beached her at College Point, Queens, New York. All four people on board were rescued by a launch.
R. D. Spear	United States	The 352-gross register ton schooner foundered in the Atlantic Ocean 250 nautical miles (460 km; 290 mi) north of Bermuda. All seven people on board survived.
Tar Heel	United States	The steamer sank at dock over night, probably snagged by the dock on a rising tide at Georgetown, South Carolina.
Wave	United States	The 67-gross register ton schooner burned at Tampa, Florida. All five people on board survived.

=== 4 November ===
List of shipwrecks: 4 November 1908
Ship	State	Description
Schelde	Belgium	The steamer was wrecked 20 nautical miles (37 km) north of Sapienza, Italy.

=== 5 November ===
List of shipwrecks: 5 November 1908
Ship	State	Description
A. C. Maxwell	United States	The 469-gross register ton schooner barge was sunk at dock in a collision with the steamer R. W. England (United States) in the Sault Ste. Marie River in Michigan. All six people on board survived.
H. M. Whitney	United States	The ship attempted to avoid a collision with a tug and four barges off Hallett's Point and ran aground on the east end of Ward's Island and sank. Raised and repaired.
James A. Brown	United States	The 198-gross register ton schooner foundered 60 nautical miles (110 km; 69 mi) southwest of Cape Elizabeth, Maine. All four people on board survived.
Ruth	United States	The 27-gross register ton sternwheel paddle steamer burned to the water's edge and sank in 20 feet of water at the "Cut-Off" in the Atchafalaya River in Louisiana. All six people on board survived.

=== 6 November ===
List of shipwrecks: 6 November 1908
Ship	State	Description
Henry Clausen, jr.	United States	The 549-gross register ton schooner was abandoned at sea during a voyage from Gulfport, Mississippi, to São Miguel Island in the Azores. All nine people on board survived.
Howard Compton	United States	The 583-gross register ton schooner was abandoned in the Atlantic Ocean east of North Carolina at 35°38′N 073°40′W. All seven people on board survived.

=== 7 November ===
List of shipwrecks: 7 November 1908
Ship	State	Description
Mabel W. Gouldman	United States	The 33-gross register ton screw steamer burned in the Chesapeake Bay. All 14 people on board survived.
Pontón No. 5	Chilean Navy	The barge broke from her moorings in a storm and sank in Gente Grande Bay. Her seven crew survived.

=== 11 November ===
List of shipwrecks: 11 November 1908
Ship	State	Description
Holm	United States	The dredge boat was sunk in a collision with the dredge boat Nerius (United States) in the Grade Raising Canal in Houston, Texas due to Nerius having steering problems. Raised and repaired.
John C Pringle	United States	The steamer sprung a leak in heavy weather off Cleveland, Ohio and was beached to prevent sinking. Refloated on 19 November and taken into the harbor where she sank.

=== 12 November ===
List of shipwrecks: 12 November 1908
Ship	State	Description
Florence Shay	United States	The 405-gross register ton schooner was stranded at Virginia Beach, Virginia, with the loss of two lives. There were four survivors.
Hampton	United States	The steamer foundered in a storm in Pamlico Sound. Crew landed at Ocracoke, North Carolina.

=== 14 November ===
List of shipwrecks: 14 November 1908
Ship	State	Description
Andrew J. Bradshaw	United States	The 25-gross register ton schooner sank in the Chesapeake Bay. All three people on board survived.
Falls of Halladale	United Kingdom	Falls of Halladale The barque ran aground near Peterborough, Victoria, Australia in a fog. All 29 crew reached safety.
Independent	United States	The 2,253-gross register ton schooner barge foundered off Hog Island in the Virginia Barrier Islands on the coast of Virginia with the loss of all five people on board.
Marie F. Cummins	United States	The 548-gross register ton schooner was stranded on the coast of Delaware 12 miles (19 km) south of the Delaware Breakwater. All seven people on board survived.

=== 15 November ===
List of shipwrecks: 15 November 1908
Ship	State	Description
France	France	The cargo schooner foundered on the Minquiers south of Jersey Channel Islands when en route from Dunkirk, France, for Granville, France, with a cargo of scoria.
Seaman	United States	The 181-gross register ton schooner was stranded on Pilot Island in Lake Michigan off the coast of Wisconsin. All six people on board survived.

=== 16 November ===
List of shipwrecks: 16 November 1908
Ship	State	Description
Jennie Thomas	United States	The 691-gross register ton schooner was abandoned in the Atlantic Ocean 300 miles (260 nmi; 480 km) east of Sandy Hook, New Jersey in heavy seas. All seven people on board were rescued by Afghanistan (United Kingdom).

=== 18 November ===
List of shipwrecks: 18 November 1908
Ship	State	Description
Pascal P. Pratt	United States	The 1,927-gross register ton screw steamer caught fire on Lake Erie off Long Point, Ontario and was beached, burning to the water's edge. All 18 people on board survived.

=== 20 November ===
List of shipwrecks: 20 November 1908
Ship	State	Description
Emerald	United States	The steamer was sunk in a collision with H. Houghten (United States) at Detroit.

=== 21 November ===
List of shipwrecks: 21 November 1908
Ship	State	Description
Alert	United States	The steamer was wrecked on rocks near Limekiln Crossing in the Detroit River at Detroit. Later she slipped off the rocks, broke in two and sank.
City of Mt. Clemens	Canada	The steamer was sunk in a collision with James B. Neilson (United States) at Detroit.
H. M. Carter	United States	The 97-gross register ton sternwheel paddle steamer's boiler exploded, she burned to the waterline and sank in the Mississippi River at Palo Alto, Louisiana or Plaquemine, Louisiana, killing 11 crewmen of the 41 people on board.

=== 22 November ===
List of shipwrecks: 22 November 1908
Ship	State	Description
Berwyn	United States	The 269-gross register ton schooner foundered off Plum Island, Wisconsin. All seven people on board survived.
Fann	United States	The 5-gross register ton schooner was stranded at China Point on the coast of Mexico. Both people on board survived.
Gardetta	United States	The 22-gross register ton schooner was stranded on Harbor Island in Muscongus Bay on the coast of Maine. Both people on board survived.

=== 23 November ===
List of shipwrecks: 23 November 1908
Ship	State	Description
J. M. Harvey	United States	The 22-gross register ton motor vessel was stranded on Lake Michigan 6 miles (9.7 km) south of Sheboygan, Wisconsin, a total wreck. All three people on board survived.

=== 24 November ===
List of shipwrecks: 24 November 1908
Ship	State	Description
Horace W. Macomber	United States	The 1,050-gross register ton schooner was stranded on Moselle Shoal in the Abaco Islands in the northern Bahamas. All nine people on board survived.
Hugh G.	United States	The schooner was sunk in a collision with a mud scow off Graves Light, Boston, Massachusetts. Lost with all five hands, plus one from the scow.

=== 25 November ===
List of shipwrecks: 25 November 1908
Ship	State	Description
Sardinia	United Kingdom	The passenger-cargo ship burst into flames minutes after leaving the Grand Harbour in Malta, and she ran aground off Fort Ricasoli. Only 33 people on board survived, and at least 118 were killed.
North Star	United States	The 2,476-gross register ton screw steamer was lost in a collision with the screw steamer Northern Queen (United States) three miles (4.8 km) below Port Sanilac, Ontario. All 22 people on board survived.

=== 26 November ===
List of shipwrecks: 26 November 1908
Ship	State	Description
Aurora	United States	The 9-gross register ton schooner was stranded on Tiger Island in Texas. Both people on board survived.
Finance	United States	The 2,603-gross register ton screw steamer sank with the loss of one crewman and three passengers after colliding with the ocean liner Georgic (United Kingdom) in the main ship channel in New York Harbor off Sandy Hook, New Jersey. The other 144 people aboard Finance survived.
Fred A. Lee	United States	The tug sprung a leak over night and sank next to a dredge that she was tied up to at the foot of Amherst Street, Buffalo, New York.

=== 27 November ===
List of shipwrecks: 27 November 1908
Ship	State	Description
Aurora	Norway	The barque was stranded on Brier Island, Nova Scotia, Canada, in fog, on a voyage from Annapolis, Nova Scotia, to Argentina, with timber; by mid-December the hull was breaking up.

=== 28 November ===
List of shipwrecks: 28 November 1908
Ship	State	Description
Barbara C.	United States	The launch was sunk in a collision with Packet John Quill (United States) at Mobile, Alabama. Her occupants climbed up the steamer's wheel.
Peri	United States	The 13-gross register ton motor vessel burned at Canarsie, Brooklyn, New York. Both people on board survived.

=== 29 November ===
List of shipwrecks: 29 November 1908
Ship	State	Description
Patrick McGuirl	United States	The tug was damaged in a collision in the East River off Pier 4 with the tug Transfer No. 1 (United States). She sailed to a slip between Piers 4 and 5 and sank.

=== 30 November ===
List of shipwrecks: 30 November 1908
Ship	State	Description
Brookhill	United States	The steamer while tied up at dock was pushed by strong wind into a snag punching a hole in her hull and she sank at Baton Rouge in 30 feet (9.1 m) of water. Raised and repaired.
D. Cawley	United States	The steamer hit a pier of a railroad bridge, capsized and sank at Arthur City, Texas. One crewman killed.

=== Unknown November ===
List of shipwrecks: Unknown November 1908
Ship	State	Description
Missouri	United States	The motor boat sank sometime during the month in a windstorm while tied up to the bank of the Missouri River, no specific location sited.

== December ==
=== 1 December ===
List of shipwrecks: 1 December 1908
Ship	State	Description
D. M. Clemson	United States	During a voyage from Lorain, Ohio, to Duluth, Minnesota, with 24 people on board, the 5,531-gross register ton steel-hulled screw steamer sank in a gale. She was reported near Whitefish Point on the coast of Michigan on 30 November. She subsequently disappeared, sinking somewhere in Lake Superior. Lost with all hands.
Shawmut	United States	The 468-gross register ton barkentine was stranded on Yellowhead Island in Machias Bay on the coast of Maine. All seven people on board survived.

=== 2 December ===
List of shipwrecks: 2 December 1908
Ship	State	Description
Rye	United States	The coal boat struck a rock in the East River off Lawrences Point by the entrance to the Casino Beach gas dock. She developed a leak and sank.
Soo City	United States	The 670-gross register ton screw steamer off Sandy Hook, New Jersey, or in the Gulf of Saint Lawrence with the loss of all 19 people on board.

=== 3 December ===
List of shipwrecks: 3 December 1908
Ship	State	Description
SMS Huszár	Austro-Hungarian Navy	The Huszár-class destroyer ran aground near Traste on the coast of the Adriatic Sea. She sank on 12 December.
No. 101	United States	The 457-gross register ton steel-hulled schooner barge sank in a Gale in the Bay of Fundy off the coast of Maine 32 nautical miles (59 km; 37 mi) east of Seal Island with the loss of all seven people on board.
Roy	United States	The 12-gross register ton sternwheel motor paddle vessel foundered in the Missouri River at Boonville, Missouri. Both people on board survived.

=== 4 December ===
List of shipwrecks: 4 December 1908
Ship	State	Description
James W. Husted	United States	The tow steamer developed a leak and sank at the Port Reading, New Jersey Coal Dock.
USS Yankee	United States Navy	Aground since 23 September, the training ship was refloated, but sank while under tow in Buzzards Bay off the coast of Massachusetts later in the day. Her boilers and other equipment were salvaged in 1917–1918.

=== 5 December ===
List of shipwrecks: 5 December 1908
Ship	State	Description
City Belle	United States	The 20-gross register ton ferry was destroyed by fire at Port Deposit, Maryland, a total loss. Both people on board survived.
Sunny Side	United States	The 27-gross register ton schooner foundered in West Penobscot Bay on the coast of Maine. Both people on board survived.
Wioma	United States	The tug sank at the Market Street Gas Works dock, Newark, New Jersey due to an open seacock. Raised the next day and taken to Perth Amboy, New Jersey for inspection and returned to service.

=== 6 December ===
List of shipwrecks: 6 December 1908
Ship	State	Description
M. B. Stetson	United States	The 120-gross register ton schooner was stranded at Cow Head, Newfoundland. All eight people on board survived.

=== 7 December ===
List of shipwrecks: 7 December 1908
Ship	State	Description
Virginia E.	United States	The coal boat sank in high winds off Erie Basin, Brooklyn.
Vivian	United States	The steamer struck a submerged dock and sank in nine feet (2.7 m) of water at Waddington, New York. Later raised.

=== 8 December ===
List of shipwrecks: 8 December 1908
Ship	State	Description
Anthracite	United States	The tug sank in a collision with the ferry Maryland (United States) off Pier A, North River. Two crewmen killed, five rescued by other vessels.

=== 9 December ===
List of shipwrecks: 9 December 1908
Ship	State	Description
Alma H	United States	With no one on board, the 37-gross register ton passenger steamer or motor vessel was totally destroyed by fire at St. Augustine, Florida. Fire is supposed Arson.
Robin Hood	United States	The 92-gross register ton schooner was stranded on Woods Island on the coast of Newfoundland. All six people on board survived.

=== 11 December ===
List of shipwrecks: 11 December 1908
Ship	State	Description
Isabelle	United States	The steamer was destroyed by fire in Jack's Creek, North Carolina.
Leader	United States	The 26-gross register ton screw steamer burned to the waterline near Oldmans Creek in New Jersey. All four people on board survived.
Urfa	Ottoman Navy	The Antalya-class torpedo boat foundered in a storm off Selonik.

=== 12 December ===
List of shipwrecks: 12 December 1908
Ship	State	Description
Ellen	Australia	Ellen The coastal cargo ship and fishing trawler was wrecked in Gulf St Vincent at Morgan's Beach near Cape Jervis, South Australia.
Isabelle	United States	The 13-gross register ton motor vessel burned on Jacks Creek in North Carolina. All three people on board survived.

=== 13 December ===
List of shipwrecks: 13 December 1908
Ship	State	Description
Yale	United States	The tug listed, filled with water, and sank in the harbor of Buffalo, New York when the steamer she was towing. Yale sheered off course causing her to careen.

=== 14 December ===
List of shipwrecks: 14 December 1908
Ship	State	Description
Coot	Iceland	The steam trawler, towing fishing boat Kópanes, suffered propeller damage by her tow and both vessels drifted ashore on Vatnsleysuströnd at Keilisnes, about 5 miles west of Hafnarfjörður, becoming wrecks.
Kópanes	Iceland	The fishing boat was in tow of steam trawler Coot fishing boat Kópanes but damaged Coot's propeller. Both vessels drifted ashore on Vatnsleysuströnd at Keilisnes, about 5 miles west of Hafnarfjörður, becoming wrecks.

=== 15 December ===
List of shipwrecks: 15 December 1908
Ship	State	Description
City of Peoria	United States	The steamer sunk at dock at Peoria, Illinois when a pipe froze and broke. Later raised.

=== 16 December ===
List of shipwrecks: 16 December 1908
Ship	State	Description
Eldorado	United States	The 96-gross register ton screw steamer burned to the waterline while tied up for the night at Phippsburg, Maine. Sources differ as to whether four people or no one was on board, but there was no loss of life.
Thomas Parker	United States	The 57-gross register ton sternwheel paddle steamer burned on the Ohio River at Owensboro, Kentucky. All seven people on board survived.

=== 17 December ===
List of shipwrecks: 17 December 1908
Ship	State	Description
Thos. Parker	United States	The out of commission steamer was destroyed by fire while lying at the bank at Owensboro, Kentucky.

=== 18 December ===
List of shipwrecks: 18 December 1908
Ship	State	Description
Daghestan	United Kingdom	Bound from New York City to Marseille, France, with a cargo of grain, the 3,466-gross register ton steam cargo ship collided with the cargo ship Catalone (United Kingdom) off Sandy Hook, New Jersey, at the entrance to the Gedney Channel and sank in 70 feet (21 m) of water. She sank slowly enough for her entire crew of 35 men to abandon ship safely in her lifeboats.

=== 20 December ===
List of shipwrecks: 20 December 1908
Ship	State	Description
William Neely	United States	The 897-gross register ton schooner departed Carteret, New Jersey, bound for Savannah, Georgia, with eight people on board and was never heard from again.

=== 21 December ===
List of shipwrecks: 21 December 1908
Ship	State	Description
American Eagle	United States	The steamer caught fire in the Maumee River at Toledo, Ohio and was beached. By the time the fire was put out she was a total loss.
Eagle	United States	The decommissioned passenger steamer was disposed of by burning in Lake Michigan two miles (3.2 km) off Chicago, Illinois.
Irada	United Kingdom	The 5,334-gross register ton cargo steamship foundered on the cliffs at Mizen Head, the most southwesterly point of Ireland. Captain A Roberts, the stewardess and four men died. 65 men were rescued, after a night clinging to the cliff face, by the men building Mizen Head Fog Signal Station.
R. Somers	United States	The 7-gross register ton schooner was stranded in the Back River on the coast of Virginia. All three people on board survived.

=== 22 December ===
List of shipwrecks: 22 December 1908
Ship	State	Description
Alma	United States	The 17-gross register ton screw steamer sank off Cape May, New Jersey. All five people on board survived.
Jeanie Lippitt	United States	The 742-gross register ton schooner was stranded on Winter Quarter Shoal off the coast of Virginia with the loss of seven lives. There was one survivor.
Jennie L. Smith	United States	The 30-gross register ton motor vessel burned at South Somerset, Massachusetts. All five people on board survived.
Nellie	United States	The steamer sank in the Ohio River at Industry, Pennsylvania. A watchman died.
Thomas Friant	United States	With no one on board, the 81-gross register ton screw steamer burned to the water's edge at Sault Ste. Marie, Michigan, a total loss.
Wm. J. Lermond	United States	The 887-gross register ton schooner foundered off Currituck Beach, North Carolina. All nine people on board survived.

=== 24 December ===
List of shipwrecks: 24 December 1908
Ship	State	Description
Harry Messer	United States	The 627-gross register ton schooner was stranded on the Handkerchief Shoal off the coast of Massachusetts. All eight people on board survived.

=== 25 December ===
List of shipwrecks: 25 December 1908
Ship	State	Description
Advance	Australia	The steam tug collided in fog with Inverna (flag unknown) and sank off Catherine Hill Bay, New South Wales, Australia.
Gotoma	United States	The 198-gross register ton schooner was abandoned at sea off the harbor at Willapa, Washington. All eight people on board survived.

=== 26 December ===
List of shipwrecks: 26 December 1908
Ship	State	Description
Crane	United Kingdom	The steam trawler sank off Tobermory.
Rhine	United States	The 10-gross register ton motor vessel foundered off Frankfort, Michigan. All four people on board lost their lives.
Telefon	Norway	The 1,538 GRT steamer on a passage from Rotterdam to the South Shetland Islands with a cargo of coal ran aground at the entrance of Admiralty Bay and subsequently wrecked.

=== 28 December ===
List of shipwrecks: 28 December 1908
Ship	State	Description
J. W. Branning	United States	The steamer was destroyed by fire at Edenton, North Carolina.
Myra W. Spear	United States	The 156-gross register ton schooner foundered with the loss of three lives 20 nautical miles (37 km; 23 mi) west of Highland Light on the coast of Massachusetts. There were two survivors.

=== 29 December ===
List of shipwrecks: 29 December 1908
Ship	State	Description
Albany	United Kingdom	The 120.1-foot (36.6 m), 215-ton steam trawler was wrecked in a blizzard at Tangytavil, North Machrihanis, Kintrye, Scotland, a Total Loss. Crew taken off 2 days later.
Clara	United States	The tow steamer sank at dock in the Delaware River at Philadelphia. Raised on 31 December.
Dahomey	United Kingdom	The Elder Dempster 2,854 GRT cargo/passenger ship ran aground at Abaco. She was refloated and beached 2 nautical miles (3.7 km) from Nassau, Bahamas as a total loss. She was en route from Newport News for Veracruz with a cargo of coal.
Modoc	United States	The 189-gross register ton schooner was abandoned off Cape Ann, Massachusetts. All seven people on board survived.

=== 30 December ===
List of shipwrecks: 30 December 1908
Ship	State	Description
Pere Marquette 17	United States	The car ferry ran aground three miles (4.8 km) south of Big Point Sable. Pulled off on 13 January 1909 and taken to Ludington, Michigan.
Vera	United States	The 110-gross register ton schooner was stranded on Walkers Ledge off Cape Canso, Nova Scotia. All 16 people on board survived.

=== 31 December ===
List of shipwrecks: 31 December 1908
Ship	State	Description
Grange	United Kingdom	The 1,519 GRT cargo passenger steamer on a passage from Grangemouth to London with general cargo and passengers ran into heavy weather, sprang a leak forward and foundered at 10:20 about 35 nautical miles (65 km) northeast of Tyne piers. All 55 people including crew and passengers were saved by trawler Eleazer and landed safely in South Shields.
Kwarra	United Kingdom	The Elder Dempster 812 GRT cargo ship, used in the West Africa coastal feeder service, developed a leak and sank in the Forcados River, Nigeria.
Spring Garden	United States	The 23-gross register ton screw steamer was destroyed by fire at Cobhams Wharf on the James River in Virginia, a total loss. All five people on board survived.

=== Unknown date ===
List of shipwrecks: Unknown date 1908
Ship	State	Description
Ida Watts	United States	The 98-ton two-masted schooner was wrecked with the loss of one life at Sand Point, Alaska.

== Unknown date ==
List of shipwrecks: Unknown date 1908
Ship	State	Description
Bennington	United States	The barge foundered off Whitefish Point, Lake Superior with the loss of 2 crew in the Fall on, or before, 6 October.
Pride of Virginia	United States	The 13-gross register ton motor paddle vessel burned on the Yazoo River at Yazoo City, Mississippi. All five people on board survived.
Trader	United States	The schooner became a total loss at Indian Point (now Cape Chaplino) on the Bering Sea coast of Siberia.
Warren Gates	United States	The 73-gross register ton schooner was stranded at Southold, Long Island, New York, on an unidentified date. All five people on board survived.
