= USS Chippewa =

USS Chippewa may refer to the following ships:

- USS Chippewa (1813), was a schooner captured in 1813 from British forces, which later burned the ship in the same year.
- USS Chippewa (1814) was a 106-gun ship of the line for which construction began after the signing of a contract 15 December 1814, but the ship was never launched. Uncompleted, the ship was sold 1 November 1833.
- USS Chippewa (1815), was a brig under the direction of Commodore Oliver Perry. The ship ran aground on an uncharted reef in the Bahamas and sank 12 December 1816.
- USS Chippewa (1861), was a wooden screw steamer gunboat launched in 1861 and active in the American Civil War, then sold in 1865.
- USS Chippewa (AT-69) was an ocean tug commissioned in 1943 and decommissioned in 1947. She was sunk in 1990 in Florida to serve as an artificial reef.

== See also ==
- SS Chippewa, steamships with the name
- Chippewa (disambiguation)
