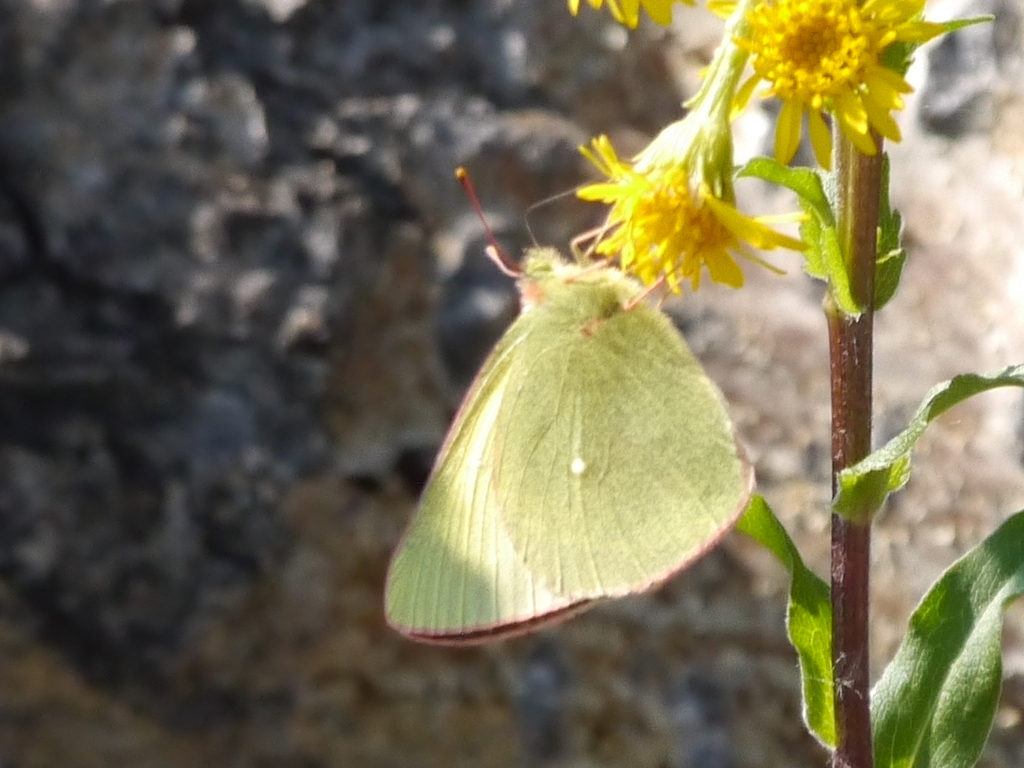

Scientific classification
- Kingdom: Animalia
- Phylum: Arthropoda
- Class: Insecta
- Order: Lepidoptera
- Family: Pieridae
- Genus: Colias
- Species: C. chippewa

Binomial name
- Colias chippewa W.H. Edwards, 1872

= Colias chippewa =

Heath sulphur

Species of butterfly

Colias chippewa, the heath sulphur, is a butterfly in the family Pieridae found in North America and northeastern Asia. Its range includes Alaska across northern Canada, including all the territories, and as far east as Labrador. and the Russian Far East.

Flight period is from mid-June until early August.

Wingspan is from 32 to 45 mm.

Larvae feed on Vaccinium uliginosum and Vaccinium caespitosum.

== Habitat ==
Bogs and tundras.

== Taxonomy ==
Colias chippewa may be a subspecies of Colias palaeno see Grieshuber & Lamas, 2007; however, C. chippewa is considered a separate species from C. palaeno by Guppy and Shepard (2001) on the basis of work by V. K. Tuzov (which they quote). He found that, in the Magadan region of Siberia, the two forms were sympatric but locally separated C. chippewa was restricted to stream-edges in dry tundra and C.palaeno was found only in low-elevation forested swamps.

== Subspecies ==
Listed alphabetically.

- C. c. baffinensis Ebner & Ferris, 1978 Baffin Island.
- C. c. chippewa
- C. c. gomojunovae Korshunov, 1996 Russian Far East (Chukotka, Magadan)
