= Chippawa =

Chippawa may refer to:

- Chippawa, Ontario, Canada, a community
- Battle of Chippawa, a battle of the War of 1812
- Welland River, Ontario, originally named Chippawa Creek
- HMCS Chippawa, a Canadian Naval Reserve division in Winnipeg, Manitoba, Canada
