= List of shipwrecks in Lake Ontario =

Map of the Great Lakes, with Lake Ontario in darker blue

The smallest of the Great Lakes by surface area, Lake Ontario is divided between Canada and the United States, bordered by the province of Ontario, and the state of New York. The lake feeds into the St. Lawrence River, connecting the Great Lakes with he Atlantic Ocean.

The Lake Ontario National Marine Sanctuary, the third such sanctuary on the Great Lakes, was established in 2024. It protects 41 known historically significant shipwrecks spanning 200 years of American maritime history, as well as 19 potential shipwreck sites. One of the wrecks is listed on the National Register of Historic Places and one is listed as a New York State Submerged Cultural Preserve and Dive Site.

== Shipwrecks ==
Ship	Ship type	Build date	Sunk date	Flag	Fate	Coordinates	Image	Sources
Adiramled	Wooden steam barge	1866	1912	Canada		43.981553°N 76.385925°W		
American	Wooden schooner	1870	1894	United States	Sank on 1 October 1894, off the coast of Stony Point, New York.	43.83493°N 76.43574°W		
Bay State	Wooden steamship	1852	1862	United States	Broke up and sank in a severe storm west of Oswego, New York, on 5 November 1862, with the loss of all on board. A lifeboat, wreckage, and cargo from the ship washed ashore at Fair Haven, New York.	43.50153°N 76.53476°W		
Comet	Wooden steamboat	1848	1861	United Kingdom	Sank in a collision with the schooner Exchange off Nine Mile Point on 14 May 1861, while laden with farming implements. The collision resulted in a fire and an explosion, killing 2 to 3 people.	44.1388°N 76.584517°W		
David W. Mills	Bulk carrier	1874	1919	United States	Ran hard aground on Ford Shoal 4.5 miles (7.2 km) west of Oswego on 11 August 1919, when smoke from forest fires obscured Oswego Lighthouse. The wreck subsequently broke up in a violent storm and sank. It is listed as a New York State Submerged Cultural Preserve and Dive Site.	43.4438°N 76.584917°W		
Ellsworth	Wooden steam barge	1869	1877	United States	Burned and sank on 10 July 1877, off the southeast point of Stony Island. A partially successful salvage effort in 1879 resulted in the wreck breaking up.	43.916111°N 76.325833°W		
Hartford	Wooden schooner	1873	1894	United States	The three-masted schooner encountered a storm on 12 October 1894, and anchored in Mexico Bay near Oswego, but broke up and sank with the loss of all on board.	43.652389°N 76.202056°W		
Queen of the Lake	Wooden scow schooner	1853	1906	United States	Encountered severe weather about 10 miles (16 km) from Sodus Point and sank on 1 November 1906.	43.2955°N 76.9687°W		
Roberval	Steel steam barge	1907	1916	Canada	Foundered on 25 September 1916, while hauling a deckload of lumber from Cape Vincent, New York, to Oswego. Fell into the trough between waves mid–lake, causing the cargo to shift, and Roberval to founder. Two of the crew were killed. Wreck located in 2022.	43.685039°N 76.584883°W		
St. Peter	Wooden schooner	1873	1898	United States	On 27 October 1898, the 135.7-foot (41.4 m) three-masted schooner sank in a storm off Bear Creek on the coast of New York, just west of Sodus Bay and northeast of Pultneyville, New York.	43.311667°N 77.131111°W		
Three Brothers	Wooden schooner	1827	1833	United States	Disappeared in a storm after departing Oswego on 12 November 1833, bound for Pultneyville. Her wreck was discovered in 2014 off Nine Mile Point.	43.52178°N 76.57229°W		
Washington (also Lady Washington)	Wooden sloop	1797	1803	United States	Departed Niagara-on-the-Lake, Ontario, for Kingston, Ontario, on 6 November 1803. Disappeared in a severe storm with the loss of all on board. Wreckage from Washington washed up on the coast near Oswego on 7 November. Her wreck, discovered near Oswego in June 2016, is the earliest known shipwreck in the sanctuary.	43.43638°N 76.70535°W		

== See also ==
- List of shipwrecks on the Great Lakes
- List of Great Lakes shipwrecks on the National Register of Historic Places

== Bibliography ==
- Kohl, Cris (2008). The Great Lakes Diving Guide (2nd ed.). West Chicago: Seawolf Communications. ISBN 978-0-9679-9769-8 – via Internet Archive.
- Mansfield, John Brandt (1899). History of the Great Lakes. Chicago: J. H. Beers & Company – via Internet Archive.
