= SS Chippewa =

Several steamships have been named Chippewa after the Chippewa people, including:

- SS Chippewa (1900), sold to Puget Sound Navigation Company in 1907, rebuilt as an auto ferry in 1926 and converted to diesel power in 1932, became a restaurant in 1964, burned in 1968
- SS Chippewa (1905), scrapped in 1928

== See also ==
- Chippewa (disambiguation)
- USS Chippewa
