= List of shipwrecks in 1817 =

The list of shipwrecks in 1817 includes ships sunk, wrecked or otherwise lost during 1817.

table of contents
1817
| Jan | Feb | Mar | Apr |
| May | Jun | Jul | Aug |
| Sep | Oct | Nov | Dec |
Unknown date

== January ==
=== 1 January ===
List of shipwrecks: 1 January 1817
| Ship | State | Description |
|---|---|---|
| Better Luck Still | United Kingdom | The ship departed from São Miguel, Azores. No further trace, presumed foundered with the loss of all hands. |
| Finch | United Kingdom | The ship departed from Texel, North Holland, Netherlands for Liverpool, Lancashire. No further trace, presumed foundered with the loss of all hands. |
| Narova | Hamburg | The ship departed from Cuxhaven for London, United Kingdom. No further trace, presumed foundered with the loss of all hands. |

=== 2 January ===
List of shipwrecks: 2 January 1817
| Ship | State | Description |
|---|---|---|
| Speculator | United Kingdom | The ship departed from Pillau, Prussia for Newcastle-upon-Tyne, Northumberland. No further trace, presumed foundered with the loss of all hands. |

=== 3 January ===
List of shipwrecks: 3 January 1817
| Ship | State | Description |
|---|---|---|
| Elizabeth | United Kingdom | The ship ran aground at "Rora". She was refloated and put in to Gothenburg, Sweden. |

=== 4 January ===
List of shipwrecks: 4 January 1817
| Ship | State | Description |
|---|---|---|
| Indefatigable | United Kingdom | The ship was driven ashore at Liverpool, Lancashire. She was on a voyage from Lisbon, Portugal, to Liverpool. |
| Mary | United Kingdom | The ship foundered in the North Sea with the loss of all hands. She was on a voyage from Great Yarmouth, Norfolk, to Leith, Lothian. |
| Mary | United Kingdom | The ship was abandoned off Newfoundland, British North America. She was on a voyage from St. John's, Newfoundland, to a Scottish port. Mary subsequently came ashore at Bay Bulls, Newfoundland, and was wrecked. |
| Pearl | United Kingdom | The ship sank at the Isle of Skye. She was on a voyage from the River Clare to Greenock, Renfrewshire. |
| Resolution | United Kingdom | The brig was driven ashore at Porthleven, Cornwall. Her crew were rescued. She was on a voyage from Oporto, Portugal, to London. Resolution broke up on 6 January. Resolution was plundered and wrecked by the local inhabitants. |

=== 5 January ===
List of shipwrecks: 5 January 1817
| Ship | State | Description |
|---|---|---|
| Freundschaft | Hanover | The ship was wrecked at Heligoland. She was on a voyage from Norden to London, United Kingdom. |
| Gerarda Jacoba Louisa | Netherlands | The ship foundered in the Vlie. Her crew were rescued. She was on a voyage from Berbice to Amsterdam, North Holland. |
| Mary | United Kingdom | The ship was abandoned in the Bay of Bulls. She was on a voyage from Newfoundland to a Scottish port. |
| Peace | United Kingdom | The ship departed Smyrna, Ottoman Empire, for Alexandria, Egypt. No further trace, presumed foundered in the Mediterranean Sea with the loss of all hands. |

=== 6 January ===
List of shipwrecks: 6 January 1817
| Ship | State | Description |
|---|---|---|
| Ceres | Netherlands | The ship was lost near Boulogne, Pas-de-Calais, France. She was on a voyage from Demerara to Amsterdam, North Holland. |
| Eclipse | United Kingdom | The ship was driven in to Mary Fell at New Quay, Cardiganshire, and sank. She was on a voyage from Liverpool, Lancashire, to Rio de Janeiro. |
| Mary Fell | United Kingdom | The ship was driven ashore and wrecked at New Quay. She was on a voyage from Liverpool to Buenos Aires, Argentina. |

=== 7 January ===
List of shipwrecks: 7 January 1817
| Ship | State | Description |
|---|---|---|
| A. B. C. | Netherlands | The brig was severely damaged in a storm at Rio de Janeiro, United Kingdom of Portugal, Brazil and the Algarves. |
| Alexis | Russia | The full-rigged ship was driven ashore in a storm at Rio de Janeiro. She was refloated the next day. |
| Antelope | United Kingdom | The schooner was damaged in a storm at Rio de Janeiro. |
| Charlotte | Russia | The ship was driven ashore in a storm at Rio de Janeiro. She was refloated on 11 January. |
| Constante | United Kingdom | The schooner was damaged in a storm at Rio de Janeiro. |
| Cossack | United Kingdom | The schooner capsized in a storm at Rio de Janeiro. She was later righted. |
| Ferret | United Kingdom | The schooner was damaged in a storm at Rio de Janeiro. |
| Henrietta | France | The brig was damaged in a storm at Rio de Janeiro. |
| Herculese | Portugal | The full-rigged ship was driven ashore in a storm at Rio de Janeiro. She was refloated the next day. |
| Holland | United States | The brig was driven ashore in a storm at Rio de Janeiro. She was refloated the next day. |
| La Bonne Henriette | France | The brig was damaged in a storm at Rio de Janeiro. |
| Triton | United Kingdom | The full-rigged ship was damaged in a storm at Rio de Janeiro. |
| Treasurer | United Kingdom | The full-rigged ship was damaged in a storm at Rio de Janeiro. |
| West Indian | United Kingdom | The brig was damaged in a storm at Rio de Janeiro. |
| Many unnamed vessels | United Kingdom of Portugal, Brazil and the Algarves | The coasters were driven ashore in a storm at Rio de Janeiro. Three of them were wrecked. |

=== 8 January ===
List of shipwrecks: 8 January 1817
| Ship | State | Description |
|---|---|---|
| Braddock | United Kingdom | The ship was lost near Barnstable, Massachusetts, United States. She was on a voyage from Liverpool, Lancashire, to New York, United States. |
| Dick | United Kingdom | The ship was driven ashore and wrecked near Aberdovey, Cardiganshire. She was on a voyage from London to Aberdovey. |
| Hermanus | Netherlands | The ship sank at Rotterdam, South Holland. She was on a voyage from London to Rotterdam. |
| Lord Nelson | United Kingdom | The packet ship was driven ashore at Hellevoetsluis, South Holland, Netherlands. |

=== 9 January ===
List of shipwrecks: 9 January 1817
| Ship | State | Description |
|---|---|---|
| Harmonie | Hamburg | The ship capsized at Cuxhaven. She was on a voyage from the Gulf of Venice to Cuxhaven. |

=== 10 January ===
List of shipwrecks: 10 January 1817
| Ship | State | Description |
|---|---|---|
| Ceres | Netherlands | The ship was wrecked near Boulogne, Pas-de-Calais, France with the loss of all hands. She was on a voyage from Demerara to Amsterdam, North Holland. |
| Le Jeune François | France | The ship was wrecked in the English Channel 14 leagues (42 nautical miles (78 km)) south west of The Lizard, Cornwall, United Kingdom. |

=== 12 January ===
List of shipwrecks: 12 January 1817
| Ship | State | Description |
|---|---|---|
| Fame | United States | The ship was wrecked on Harbour Island, Bahamas. Her crew were rescued. She was on a voyage from Boston, Massachusetts, to Havana, Cuba. |

=== 13 January ===
List of shipwrecks: 13 January 1817
| Ship | State | Description |
|---|---|---|
| Albion | United Kingdom | The ship was lost off Trincomalee, Ceylon. Her crew and passengers were rescued. She was on a voyage from Madras, India, to London. |

=== 14 January ===
List of shipwrecks: 14 January 1817
| Ship | State | Description |
|---|---|---|
| Agnes | United Kingdom | The ship foundered in the Bay of Biscay with the loss of all hands. She was bound for the Cape of Good Hope. |
| Millbanke | United Kingdom | The ship struck a rock and sank at Sunderland, County Durham. |

=== 15 January ===
List of shipwrecks: 15 January 1817
| Ship | State | Description |
|---|---|---|
| Adelaide | France | The ship capsized in the English Channel off Berville, Seine-Inférieure during a squall. She was on a voyage from Havre de Grâce to Rouen, Seine-Inférieure. |
| Brothers | United Kingdom | The ship was last seen on this date whilst on a voyage from Bilbao, Spain, to the United Kingdom. Presumed to have subsequently foundered with the loss of all hands. |
| Eleanor | United Kingdom | The ship was disovered abandoned and in a sinking condition by HMS Musquidobit (Royal Navy). She was taken in to Dublin. |
| Fame | United Kingdom | The ship was driven ashore at Waterford. She was on a voyage from Waterford to London. She was refloated. |
| Independent | United Kingdom | The ship was driven ashore and wrecked at Horsey, Norfolk. Her crew were rescued. She was on a voyage from Málaga, Spain to Hull, Yorkshire. |
| Owner's Delight | United Kingdom | The sloop was wrecked at Dartmouth, Devon. She was on a voyage from Portsmouth, Hampshire, to Plymouth, Devon. |
| Robusto | Portugal | The ship was driven ashore in the Straits of Banca. She was on a voyage from China to Rio de Janeiro. Robusto was later refloated with assistance from Addison (United States). |
| Sir Alexander Ball | United Kingdom | The ship was driven ashore at Livorno, Grand Duchy of Tuscany. She was on a voyage from San Domingue to Livorno. Sir Alexander Ball was later refloated and taken in to Livorno. |

=== 16 January ===
List of shipwrecks: 16 January 1817
| Ship | State | Description |
|---|---|---|
| Paix | France | The ship was wrecked at Havre de Grâce, Seine-Inférieure with some loss of life. She was on a voyage from Bayonne, Basses-Pyrénées, to Havre de Grâce. |

=== 17 January ===
List of shipwrecks: 17 January 1817
| Ship | State | Description |
|---|---|---|
| Good Hope | India | The ship was driven ashore near Trincomalee, Ceylon. |
| Oscar | Sweden | The ship was towed in to Dunkerque, Nord, France in a severely leaky condition. She was on a voyage from Gothenburg to Gibraltar. |
| Paquette de Cádiz | Spain | The ship was driven ashore and damaged at Berville, Seine-Inférieure, France. She was on a voyage from Cádiz to Havre de Grâce and Rouen, Seine-Inférieure. Paquette de Cádiz was later refloated. |
| Seepard | Bremen | The ship ran aground at Dover, Kent, United Kingdom. She was on a voyage from Bremen to Charleston, South Carolina, United States. She was refloated and taken in to Ramsgate, Kent, where she struck the pier. |
| Thomas and Margaret | United Kingdom | The ship was driven ashore near Loch Indaal. She was on a voyage from Strangford, County Down, to Londonderry. |
| Unity | United Kingdom | The ship foundered in the North Sea off Orfordness, Suffolk. |

=== 18 January ===
List of shipwrecks: 18 January 1817
| Ship | State | Description |
|---|---|---|
| Brothers Return | United States | The ship was driven ashore at Gibraltar. She was on a voyage from Marseille, Bouches-du-Rhône, France to the United States. |
| Dove | United Kingdom | The ship was driven ashore at Great Orme, Caernarfonshire. She was on a voyage from Cork to Liverpool, Lancashire. |
| El Mundo | Spain | The ship was driven ashore at Gibraltar. She was on a voyage from El Venrell to Cádiz. |
| Fox | United States | The ship was wrecked on The Vineyard. She was on a voyage from Guadeloupe to Boston, Massachusetts. |
| Norfolk Packet | United Kingdom | The ship was driven ashore and wrecked in Caernarvon Bay. Her crew were rescued. She was on a voyage from Baltimore, Maryland, United States, to Liverpool. |
| Oak | United Kingdom | The ship was driven ashore at Gibraltar. She was later refloated. |
| Robuste | United Kingdom | The ship was driven ashore in the Straits of Banca. She was on a voyage from a port in China to Rio de Janeiro, United Kingdom of Portugal, Brazil and the Algarves. |
| Three unnamed vessels | Flags unknown | The small craft were driven ashore at Gibraltar. |

=== 19 January ===
List of shipwrecks: 19 January 1817
| Ship | State | Description |
|---|---|---|
| Friendship | United Kingdom | The ship was wrecked on Cape Sable Island, British North America. Her crew were rescued. She was on a voyage from Saint Lucia to Halifax, Nova Scotia, British North America. |
| Peace | United Kingdom | The ship sank on the Newcombe Sand, in the North Sea off Great Yarmouth, Norfolk. |
| Peace | United Kingdom | The ship sank in the River Tay. |

=== 20 January ===
List of shipwrecks: 20 January 1817
| Ship | State | Description |
|---|---|---|
| Active | United Kingdom | The sloop was driven ashore and wrecked in Sandy Haven Bay. She was on a voyage from Bristol, Gloucestershire, to Haverfordwest, Pembrokeshire. |
| Albion | United Kingdom | The smack was sunk at Plymouth, Devon, with the loss of all hands. She was on a voyage from Southampton, Hampshire, to Plymouth. |
| Ann | United Kingdom | The ship was driven ashore at Newlyn, or Penzance, Cornwall. |
| Blue Bonnet | United Kingdom | The ship was wrecked 1.5 nautical miles (2.8 km) south of Girvan, Ayrshire, with the loss of all hands. She was on a voyage from Irvine, Ayrshire to Stranraer, Wigtownshire |
| Deptford | United Kingdom | The brig was wrecked in Whitesand Bay with the loss of all hands. |
| Dove | United Kingdom | The ship was sunk at Newlyn, or Penzance, Cornwall. |
| Fairy | United Kingdom | The ship was sunk at Newlyn, or Penzance. |
| Farmer's Delight | United Kingdom | The sloop was lost in Deadman's Bay, Devon. Her crew were rescued. |
| Jane | United Kingdom | The ship was driven ashore at Ayr. She was on a voyage from Ayr to Cork. |
| HMS Jasper | Royal Navy | The Cherokee-class brig-sloop was driven ashore and wrecked at Plymouth with the loss of all but two of those on board, in excess of 80 people. |
| Kitty | United Kingdom | The ship was driven ashore and wrecked at Newlyn, or sank at Penzance. She was on a voyage from Cork to London. |
| HMRC Lapwing | HM Board of Revenue | The cutter was driven ashore and wrecked at Plymouth. Her crew were rescued. |
| Louisa | United Kingdom | The ship sprang a leak in the North Sea off Flamborough Head, Yorkshire. She put into North Shields, County Durham, where she sank. |
| Maria | United Kingdom | The ship was wrecked in Bigbury Bay. She was on a voyage from Seville, Spain, to London. |
| Mary | United Kingdom | The ship was driven ashore and wrecked at Lyme, Dorset. |
| Morning Star | United States | The ship was driven ashore on the Bahama Bank. She was on a voyage from Charleston, South Carolina, to Havana, Cuba. |
| Princess Mary | United Kingdom | The packet ship was driven ashore and wrecked at Plymouth with the loss of up to ten lives. There were seventeen survivors. |
| Sir John Moore | United Kingdom | The sloop was lost near Campbeltown, Argyllshire. Her crew were rescued. |
| Springvale | United Kingdom | The ship foundered off Dunure, Ayrshire. She was on a voyage from Irvine, Ayrshire, to Dublin. |
| HMS Telegraph | Royal Navy | The schooner was driven ashore and wrecked at Mount Batten, Devon, with the loss of a crew member. |
| Trois Amis | France | The ship was lost near Bridport, Dorset, with the loss of all but one of those on board. She was on a voyage from Bordeaux, Gironde, to Rouen, Seine-Inférieure. |
| Union | United Kingdom | The ship was driven ashore and wrecked at Lyme. |
| Volante | United Kingdom | The ship was driven ashore and wrecked at Lyme. |
| Unnamed | United Kingdom | The coaster struck the Cobler Rock and sank in Plymouth Sound. She was on a voyage from Falmouth, Cornwall to Plymouth. |
| Unnamed | France | The ship was wrecked 3 nautical miles (5.6 km) east of Lyme. Probably the chasse-marée wrecked at Charmouth, Dorset with the loss of all hands. |
| Unnamed | Flag unknown | The ship was wrecked 2 nautical miles (3.7 km) west of Lyme. |
| 17 unnamed vessels | United Kingdom | The fishing boats were wrecked at Bere, Devon. |
| Several unnamed vessels | United Kingdom | The fishing boats were driven ashore at Lyme. |
| Two unnamed vessels | United Kingdom | The brigs were driven ashore at Lyme. |
| Unnamed | United Kingdom | The sloop was driven ashore at Lyme. |
| Unnamed | United Kingdom | The cutter was driven ashore at Lyme. |
| Unnamed | United Kingdom | The sloop was driven ashore at Burton, Dorset. |

=== 21 January ===
List of shipwrecks: 21 January 1817
| Ship | State | Description |
|---|---|---|
| Golden Grove | United Kingdom | Golden Grove, Taylor, master, ran aground on the Sow and Pigs Sandbank, in the North Sea off the coast of Northumberland. She was on a voyage from Gothenburg, Sweden, to Stockton-on-Tees, County Durham. |

=== 22 January ===
List of shipwrecks: 22 January 1817
| Ship | State | Description |
|---|---|---|
| Catharine | United Kingdom | The ship ran aground on the Black Rock, at the mouth of the River Mersey and sank. She was on a voyage from Leith, Lothian, to Liverpool, Lancashire. She was refloated on 1 February. |
| Catherine | United Kingdom | The ship was driven ashore at the mouth of the River Mersey. Her crew were rescued. She was on a voyage from Liverpool to Newry, County Antrim. She was refloated on 1 February and taken in to Liverpool. |
| Dolphin | Netherlands | The ship capsized on the North Gull Sandbank, in the North Sea off Margate, Kent, United Kingdom. |
| Jane | United Kingdom | The ship was driven ashore at the Neyland Rock, Kent. She was refloated the next day and taken in to Margate, Kent. Jane was on a voyage from Penryn, Cornwall, to Chatham, Kent. |
| Mary | United Kingdom | The ship foundered in the English Channel off Berry Head, Devon. She was on a voyage from Viana do Castelo, Portugal, to Plymouth and Teignmouth, Devon. |
| Perseverance | United Kingdom | The ship was driven ashore at Harwich, Essex. She was on a voyage from Newcastle upon Tyne, Northumberland, to Harwich. |
| Thetis | United Kingdom | The ship was driven ashore at Walmer Castle, Kent. She was on a voyage from Lisbon, Portugal to London. She was refloated with assistance and resumed her voyage. |
| Two Friends | United Kingdom | The ship was driven ashore and wrecked at Lowestoft, Suffolk. |

=== 23 January ===
List of shipwrecks: 23 January 1817
| Ship | State | Description |
|---|---|---|
| L'Ameçon | France | The brig was driven ashore and wrecked at Gunwalloe, Cornwall, United Kingdom with the loss of nine of her crew. There were nine survivors. She was on a voyage from Marseille, Bouches-du-Rhône, to Havre de Grâce, Seine-Inférieure. |
| Dolphin | Netherlands | The ship capsized at Ramsgate, Kent, United Kingdom. She was on a voyage from Rotterdam, South Holland, to Surinam. Dolphin was later refloated. |
| Phœnix | United Kingdom | The ship sprang a leak and was abandoned in the North Sea off Whitby, Yorkshire. Her crew were rescued by Betty ( United Kingdom). |
| William | United Kingdom | The ship was driven ashore at Rattray Head, Aberdeenshire. She was on a voyage from Inverness to Sunderland, County Durham. |

=== 24 January ===
List of shipwrecks: 24 January 1817
| Ship | State | Description |
|---|---|---|
| Cornwall | United Kingdom | A King's Yard lighter ran into Cornwall in the Gull Stream as Cornwall was setting out for Isle of France. The accident caused so much damage that Cornwall had to return to the Thames for repairs. |
| Sourie | Sweden | The ship departed from Gothenburg. No further trace, presumed foundered with the loss of all hands. |

=== 25 January ===
List of shipwrecks: 25 January 1817
| Ship | State | Description |
|---|---|---|
| America | United States | The ship was driven ashore at "Vintry". She was on a voyage from New York to Liverpool, Lancashire, United Kingdom. |
| Mary | United Kingdom | The ship was run down and sunk in the North Sea off Robin Hoods Bay, Yorkshire. Her crew were rescued. |
| Selina | United Kingdom | The ship was driven ashore at Lamlash, Isle of Arran. She was on a voyage from Whitehaven, Cumberland, to Limerick. |

=== 26 January ===
List of shipwrecks: 26 January 1817
| Ship | State | Description |
|---|---|---|
| John | United Kingdom | The ship foundered in the Irish Sea off the Isle of Man with the loss of two of her crew. |

=== 27 January ===
List of shipwrecks: 27 January 1817
| Ship | State | Description |
|---|---|---|
| Atalanta | United Kingdom | The sloop was driven ashore near Venice, Kingdom of Lombardy–Venetia with the loss of four of her six crew. She was on a voyage from Ithaca, Greece, to Trieste. Atalanta was refloated on 1 February and taken in to Venice. |

=== 28 January ===
List of shipwrecks: 28 January 1817
| Ship | State | Description |
|---|---|---|
| Albatross | United Kingdom | The ship ran aground on the Nore. She was on a voyage from Sunderland, County Durham to London. She was refloated and resume her voyage. |
| Peter | United Kingdom | The ship was lost on this date. She was on a voyage from St. Mary's to Philadelphia, Pennsylvania, United States. |
| Unnamed | United Kingdom | The schooner was discovered in a capsized condition in Bideford Bay. She was towed in to Clovelly, Devon. |

=== 29 January ===
List of shipwrecks: 29 January 1817
| Ship | State | Description |
|---|---|---|
| El Mundo | Spain | The ship was driven ashore at Gibraltar. She was on a voyage from El Vendrell to Cádiz. |
| Mercurius | Netherlands | The ship was wrecked at Brielle, South Holland. She was on a voyage from Maassluis, South Holland, to London, United Kingdom. |
| Richard & Margaret | United States | The ship was abandoned in the Atlantic Ocean (50°55′N 22°40′W). Her crew were rescued by Mohawk (United States). Richard & Margaret was on a voyage from New York to Bristol, Gloucestershire, United Kingdom. |

=== 31 January ===
List of shipwrecks: 31 January 1817
| Ship | State | Description |
|---|---|---|
| Catharine | United States | The ship was wrecked on the west coast of Bermuda. She was on a voyage from Buenos Aires to Philadelphia, Pennsylvania. |

=== Unknown date ===
List of shipwrecks: Unknown date in January 1817
| Ship | State | Description |
|---|---|---|
| Abeona | United Kingdom | The ship struck The Smalls and was severely damaged. She was on a voyage from Wexford to London. She put in to Fishguard, Pembrokeshire. |
| Alompri | United States | The ship was driven ashore in the Abaco Islands. She was on a voyage from New York to New Orleans, Louisiana. |
| Aurora | United Kingdom | The ship ran aground on the Bahama Reef. She was on a voyage from Havana, Cuba to Rotterdam, South Holland, Netherlands. She was refloated and resumed her voyage. |
| Barbara | United Kingdom | The ship departed from London for Tenerife, Spain. No further trace, presumed foundered with the loss of all hands. |
| Boreas | Sweden | The ship was driven ashore on Dragør, Denmark in early January. She was on a voyage from St. Ubes, Spain to Vyborg, Grand Duchy of Finland. |
| Diana | (United Kingdom of Great Britain and Ireland) Jamaica | The pilot boat departed from Kingston for Havana, Cuba. No further trace, presumed foundered with the loss of all hands. |
| Edmund | Netherlands | The ship foundered whilst on a voyage from Amsterdam, South Holland, to Riga, Russia. |
| Eleanor | United Kingdom | The ship was abandoned in the Irish Sea. She was discovered by HMS Mosquidobit (Royal Navy) on 15 January and was towed in to Dublin. |
| Europe | United Kingdom | The ship was lost off Cape Breton Island, Nova Scotia, British North America. She was on a voyage from Miramichi, New Brunswick, British North America to Ayr. |
| Fame | United States | The ship was driven ashore in the Elbe. She was on a voyage from Hamburg to New York. She was refloated and resued her voyage, but consequently put in to Kinsale, County Cork, United Kingdom in distress on 26 January. |
| Farnham | United Kingdom | The ship was wrecked at Chester, Cheshire. Her crew were rescued. She was on a voyage from Chester to Plymouth, Devon or Portsmouth, Hampshire. |
| Golden Grove | United Kingdom | Golden Grove, Butcher, master, from Danzig, was reported to have gotten into Eartholm leaky and was expected to be obliged to discharge. |
| Hope | United Kingdom | The ship was wrecked in the Magdalen Islands, British North America. Her crew were rescued. She was on a voyage from Miramichi Bay to Greenock, Renfrewshire. |
| Johanna | Sweden | The ship was driven ashore on Dragor in early January. She was on a voyage from Helsinki to Oporto, Portugal. |
| John and Samuel | (United Kingdom of Great Britain and Ireland) British North America | The ship foundered off Richibucto, New Brunswick. |
| Jonge Charles | Netherlands | The ship was lost off "Hitland" (Shetland). Her crew were rescued. She was on a voyage from Bergen, Norway, to Amsterdam, North Holland. |
| Julia | (United Kingdom of Great Britain and Ireland) British North America | The ship was lost off Cape Sable Island with the loss of her captain. She was on a voyage from Halifax, Nova Scotia, to St. Andrews, New Brunswick. |
| London | United Kingdom | The ship foundered in the Irish Sea off Lytham St. Annes, Lancashire. She was on a voyage from London to Liverpool, Lancashire. |
| New Orleans | (United States) Missouri Territory | The ship ran aground in the Abaco Islands. She was on a voyage from New York to New Orleans. |
| Neptune | United Kingdom | The ship was wrecked at Amelia Island, East Florida. She was on a voyage from Amelia Island to Jamaica. |
| Nereide | France | The ship was lost near Les Sables-d'Olonne, Vendée. She was on a voyage from Nantes, Loire-Inférieure to Marseille, Bouches-du-Rhône. |
| Nerina | United Kingdom | The ship was wrecked in the St. Lawrence River. |
| Purisima Concepcion | Spain | The ship was wrecked at Corribide with the loss of all but three of her crew. She was on a voyage from Rio de Janeiro to A Coruña. |
| Robert | United States | The ship departed from New York for Kingston, Jamaica. No further trace, presumed foundered in the Atlantic Ocean with the loss of all hands. |
| Rhine | Netherlands | The ship was wrecked at Port Pim, Azores, Portugal, in mid-January. She was on a voyage from Amsterdam to Boston, Massachusetts, United States. |
| Robert | United Kingdom | The ship ran aground off Egg Island, Bahamas. She was on a voyage from New Providence, Bahamas to London. She was refloated and put back to New Providence for repairs. |
| Robert Hamilton | United Kingdom | The ship departed from Berbice for London. No further trace, presumed foundered with the loss of all hands. |
| Sailor Boy | United States | The schooner departed from Gloucester, Massachusetts for the West Indies in late January. No further trace, presumed foundered with the loss of all hands. |
| Trial | United Kingdom | The ship was driven ashore on the coast of Jamaica in late January. She was on a voyage from Annatto Bay to Port Morant, Jamaica. Trial was later refloated and taken in to Sheerness Bay, Jamaica. |
| Triton | (United Kingdom of Great Britain and Ireland) Isle of Man | The ship departed from Whitehaven, Cumberland, for Ramsey. No further trace, presumed foundered with the loss of all hands. |
| Warwick | United Kingdom | The ship foundered whilst on a voyage from Liverpool, Lancashire, to Saint Thomas, Virgin Islands. |

== February ==
=== 3 February ===
List of shipwrecks: 3 February 1817
| Ship | State | Description |
|---|---|---|
| Plutus | United States | The ship was abandoned in the Atlantic Ocean having lost her rudder. She was on a voyage from Havana, Cuba to Boston, Massachusetts. |

=== 4 February ===
List of shipwrecks: 4 February 1817
| Ship | State | Description |
|---|---|---|
| Chatham | United Kingdom | The ship was wrecked at Cape Lookout, North Carolina, United States. Her crew were rescued. She was on a voyage from Wilmington, Delaware, United States, to Bristol, Gloucestershire. |
| Cornelius and Cornelia | United Kingdom | The ship ran aground off Vlieland, Friesland, Netherlands. Her crew were rescued. |
| Fortune | United Kingdom | The ship foundered off Padstow, Cornwall. Her crew were rescued. She was on a voyage from Marazion, Cornwall, to Swansea, Glamorgan. |
| Horatio | United Kingdom | The ship was wrecked at Dinas Dinlle, Caernarfonshire with the loss of all but two of her twenty, 22 or 26 crew. She was on a voyage from Trinidad to Liverpool, Lancashire. |
| Nelly | United Kingdom | The ship was driven ashore and wrecked at Whitehaven, Cumberland. |

=== 5 February ===
List of shipwrecks: 5 February 1817
| Ship | State | Description |
|---|---|---|
| Horatio | United Kingdom | The ship was wrecked at Dinas Dinlle, Caernarfonshire, with the loss of 24 of the 26 people on board. She was on a voyage from Trinidad to Liverpool, Lancashire. |
| St. Dominick | United Kingdom | The ship foundered in the English Channel off The Needles, Isle of Wight. She was on a voyage from Cork to Southampton, Hampshire. |

=== 6 February ===
List of shipwrecks: 6 February 1817
| Ship | State | Description |
|---|---|---|
| Fortune | United Kingdom | The sloop foundered in the Atlantic Ocean off Padstow, Cornwall. Her crew were rescued. She was on a voyage from Marazion, Cornwall, to Swansea, Glamorgan. |
| Providence | United Kingdom | The ship was driven ashore at Wells-next-the-Sea, Norfolk. Her crew were rescued. She was on a voyage from London to Gainsborough, Lincolnshire. Providence was later refloated and taken in to Burnham Overy Staithe, Norfolk. |

=== 7 February ===
List of shipwrecks: 7 February 1817
| Ship | State | Description |
|---|---|---|
| Farmer | United Kingdom | The ship was wrecked at Lamlash, Isle of Arran with the loss of all hands. She was on a voyage from Glasgow, Renfrewshire, to Newry, County Antrim. |
| Friends Delight | United Kingdom | The ship was wrecked in St. Bees Bay. Her crew were rescued. |
| Johns | United Kingdom | The ship was driven ashore at Scarborough Castle, Yorkshire. Her crew were rescued. She was on a voyage from London to Sunderland, County Durham. |
| Prince Leopold | United Kingdom | The ship was driven ashore at Whitehaven, Cumberland. She was on a voyage from Pernambuco, Brazil to Liverpool, Lancashire. |
| Venus | United Kingdom | The ship was foundered in the Irish Sea off Peel, Isle of Man with the loss of all on board. She was on a voyage from Belfast to London. |

=== 8 February ===
List of shipwrecks: 8 February 1817
| Ship | State | Description |
|---|---|---|
| Kingsmore | United Kingdom | The ship was abandoned in the Irish Sea. Her crew were rescued. She was on a voyage from Liverpool, Lancashire, to Pernambuco, Brazil. Kingsmore was later driven ashore and wrecked at the mouth of the River Duddon. |
| Ontario | United States | The ship was driven ashore at Dublin. |

=== 9 February ===
List of shipwrecks: 9 February 1817
| Ship | State | Description |
|---|---|---|
| Governor Strong | United Kingdom | The ship was wrecked in the Cape Verde Islands, Portugal. Her crew were rescued. She was on a voyage from Portsmouth, Hampshire, to China. |

=== 10 February ===
List of shipwrecks: 10 February 1817
| Ship | State | Description |
|---|---|---|
| Caledonia | United Kingdom | The ship was driven ashore near St. John's, Newfoundland, British North America. She was on a voyage from St. John's to Oporto, Portugal. Caledonia was refloated the next day and put into St. John's for repairs. |
| James & Mary | United Kingdom | The ship was driven ashore near St. John's. She was on a voyage from St. John's to Alicante, Spain. James & Mary was refloated the next day and put into St. John's for repairs. |

=== 11 February ===
List of shipwrecks: 11 February 1817
| Ship | State | Description |
|---|---|---|
| Emu | United Kingdom | The brig was lost on the south west coast of Africa. |
| Jong Jan | Hamburg | The ship ran aground on the Vogel Sand, in the North Sea. She was on a voyage from Rouen, Seine-Inférieure, France to Hamburg. She was refloated and taken in to Cuxhaven. |

=== 12 February ===
List of shipwrecks: 12 February 1817
| Ship | State | Description |
|---|---|---|
| Ann | United Kingdom | The ship was driven ashore on Goree Island, South Holland, Netherlands. She was on a voyage from "Saloe" to Rotterdam, South Holland. |
| Frances Mary | United States | The ship was wrecked in the Abaco Islands. She was on a voyage from Savannah, Georgia, to New Orleans, Louisiana. |
| Herkimere | United States | The ship sprang a leak and was abandoned in the Atlantic Ocean. Her crew were rescued by Nicholas ( United Kingdom). She was on a voyage from Wilmington, Delaware, to Liverpool. Lancashire, United Kingdom. Herkimere was discovered off Bermuda on 22 March by Jane ( United Kingdom) and was taken in to Cowes, Isle of Wight, where she arrived on 12 May. |
| Jonge Pieter | Netherlands | The ship was wrecked on Eierland, North Holland. Her crew were rescued. She was on a voyage from Amsterdam, North Holland, to London, United Kingdom. |
| Quebec | United Kingdom | The ship departed from Milford Haven, Pembrokeshire for London. No further trace. |

=== 13 February ===
List of shipwrecks: 13 February 1817
| Ship | State | Description |
|---|---|---|
| Betsey | United Kingdom | The ship was driven ashore at Breaksea Point, Glamorgan. She was on a voyage from Bristol, Gloucestershire, to Waterford. |
| Fortuna | (United Kingdom of Great Britain and Ireland) Gibraltar | The ship foundered in the Mediterranean Sea 20 nautical miles (37 km) off Villanova, Corsica, France. Her crew survived. She was on a voyage from Gibraltar to Genoa, Kingdom of Sardinia. |

=== 15 February ===
List of shipwrecks: 15 February 1817
| Ship | State | Description |
|---|---|---|
| Adamant | United Kingdom | The ship was driven ashore near Redcar, Yorkshire. |
| Industry | United Kingdom | The ship was driven ashore on Texel, North Holland, Netherlands. She was on a voyage from Amsterdam, North Holland, to London. Industry was later refloated and taken in to Texel. |
| Sapor | United States | The ship was driven ashore and wrecked on Sark, Channel Islands, with the loss of all hands. She was on a voyage from New York to London. |
| South Esk | United Kingdom | The ship was driven ashore at the mouth of the Arno and was abandoned by her crew. She was on a voyage from London to Genoa, Kingdom of Sardinia and Livorno, Grand Duchy of Tuscany.South Esk was refloated on 15 March and take in to Livorno. |
| Wheatsheaf | United Kingdom | The ship was driven ashore near Redcar. |

=== 16 February ===
List of shipwrecks: 16 February 1817
| Ship | State | Description |
|---|---|---|
| Amphion | United Kingdom | The ship was driven ashore at Liverpool, Lancashire. She was on a voyage from Charleston, South Carolina, United States, to Liverpool. Amphion was refloated the next day. |
| Fame | United Kingdom | The ship ran aground on the Arklow Banks, in the Irish Sea and was abandoned by her crew. She was on a voyage from Berbice to the Clyde. Fame was subsequently wrecked. |
| Lord Duncan | United Kingdom | The ship was driven ashore near Ostend, West Flanders, Netherlands. |
| Louisa | United Kingdom | The ship was wrecked at Scoglitti, Sicily, with the loss of a crew member. She was on a voyage from London to Smyrna, Ottoman Empire. |
| Upton Castle | United Kingdom | The ship was destroyed by fire in the Bengal River, India, in mid-February. |
| Waterloo | United States | The ship capsized and was abandoned in the Atlantic Ocean (38°03′N 68°20′W). She was on a voyage from Madeira, Portugal, to Philadelphia, Pennsylvania. |

=== 17 February ===
List of shipwrecks: 17 February 1817
| Ship | State | Description |
|---|---|---|
| Greenwell | United Kingdom | The ship was driven ashore near Bayonne, Basses-Pyrénées, France. Her crew were rescued. She was on a voyage from St. Andero, Spain to Antwerp, Netherlands. |
| Minstrel | United Kingdom | The schooner was wrecked on the Les Bases de Molènes Rocks, in the Bay of Biscay off Molène, Finistère, France. All nine crew survived, or were lost. She was on a voyage from Alicante, Spain, to Jersey, Channel Islands. |
| Neptunus | United Kingdom | The ship was lost off Eierland, North Holland, Netherlands. Her crew were rescued. She was on a voyage from Texel, North Holland, to Havre de Grâce, Seine-Inférieure, France. |
| Oscar | United Kingdom | The ship was driven ashore and wrecked in Tramore Bay. She was on a voyage from Baltimore, Maryland, to Liverpool, Lancashire. |
| Retrieve | United Kingdom | The ship struck rocks off Bermuda. She was on a voyage from New Orleans, Louisiana, United States to Liverpool. She put in to St. George's, Bermuda but sailed the next day. |

=== 18 February ===
List of shipwrecks: 18 February 1817
| Ship | State | Description |
|---|---|---|
| HMS Alceste | Royal Navy | The Armide-class frigate was wrecked in the Java Sea. The wreck was set afire by Dyaks on 23 February. |
| Diligence | United Kingdom | The ship foundered in the North Sea off Vlieland, Friesland, Netherlands. |
| Fly | United Kingdom | The ship was in collision with another vessel in the North Sea and sank. Her crew were rescued. She was on a voyage from Great Yarmouth, Norfolk, to Leith, Lothian. |

=== 19 February ===
List of shipwrecks: 19 February 1817
| Ship | State | Description |
|---|---|---|
| Elizabeth | United States | The ship foundered off Bermuda. She was on a voyage from Barbados to an American port. |
| Inverness | United Kingdom | The ship was driven ashore in Runvilla Bay. Her crew were rescued. She was on a voyage from Limerick to London. |
| Neptune | United Kingdom | The ship was wrecked on the coast of the Isle of Man. All on board were rescued. She was on a voyage from Liverpool, Lancashire, to Belfast, County Antrim. |

=== 20 February ===
List of shipwrecks: 20 February 1817
| Ship | State | Description |
|---|---|---|
| Active | United Kingdom | The ship was lost off the mouth of the River Cushin with the loss of all hands. She was on a voyage from Limerick to Bristol, Gloucestershire. |
| Llywnog | (United Kingdom of Great Britain and Ireland) Isle of Man | The ship foundered in the Irish Sea off "Kirk Sutton", Isle of Man with the loss of at least three lives. She was on a voyage from Chester, Cheshire, to Ramsey. |
| Mary | United Kingdom | The ship foundered in the Atlantic Ocean with the loss of three of her crew. She was on a voyage from London to Rio de Janeiro, United Kingdom of Portugal, Brazil and the Algarves. |
| Moon | United Kingdom | The ship was wrecked at Oakum Point, Devon. Her crew were rescued. She was on a voyage from Teignmouth to Topsham, Devon. |
| Neptune | United Kingdom | The ship was lost off the Isle of Man. She was on a voyage from Liverpool, Lancashire, to Belfast, County Antrim. |
| Sherbrook | United Kingdom | The ship was wrecked on Barra, Outer Hebrides with the loss of three of her crew. She was on a voyage from Glasgow, Renfrewshire to Sligo. |

=== 22 February ===
List of shipwrecks: 22 February 1817
| Ship | State | Description |
|---|---|---|
| Fanny | United Kingdom | The ship was lost 5 nautical miles (9.3 km) from the mouth of the Orinoco. Her crew were rescued. She was on a voyage from Liverpool, Lancashire, to Berbice. |
| Iris | United Kingdom | The ship was lost off Formby, Lancashire. Her crew were rescued. She was on a voyage from Great Yarmouth, Norfolk, to Liverpool, Lancashire. |

=== 23 February ===
List of shipwrecks: 23 February 1817
| Ship | State | Description |
|---|---|---|
| Wangkappen | (Russian Empire) Grand Duchy of Finland | The ship foundered in the English Channel with the presumed loss of ten of her fifteen crew. She was on a voyage from St. Ubes, Spain to Helsingfors. |

=== 24 February ===
List of shipwrecks: 24 February 1817
| Ship | State | Description |
|---|---|---|
| Venus | Netherlands | The ship foundered in the North Sea off Zierikzee, South Holland, with the loss of all but two of her crew. She was on a voyage from Oporto, Portugal, to Antwerp. |

=== 25 February ===
List of shipwrecks: 25 February 1817
| Ship | State | Description |
|---|---|---|
| Ocean | United Kingdom | The ship was abandoned in the Atlantic Ocean. Her crew survived. She was on a voyage from Havre de Grâce, Seine-Inférieure, France to Boston, Massachusetts, United States. |
| Union | United Kingdom | The ship was driven ashore and wrecked at Bakers Island, Massachusetts, United States. Her crew were rescued. |

=== 26 February ===
List of shipwrecks: 26 February 1817
| Ship | State | Description |
|---|---|---|
| Rebecca | United Kingdom | The ship was wrecked off Madeira with the loss of all but three of her crew. Survivors took to a raft. They were rescued on 28 February by the packet ship Falmouth (United Kingdom). Rebecca was on a voyage from Jamaica to Liverpool, Lancashire. |

=== 27 February ===
List of shipwrecks: 27 February 1817
| Ship | State | Description |
|---|---|---|
| Mary | United Kingdom | The ship was driven ashore on the Mile Rocks, near Liverpool, Lancashire. She was on a voyage from Liverpool to Jamaica. Mary was later refloated. |
| Nestor | United Kingdom | The ship was driven ashore in Bootle Bay. She was on a voyage from Liverpool to New York, United States. Nestor was later refloated. |
| Ocean | United Kingdom | The ship ran aground off South Shields, County Durham. She was on a voyage from British Honduras to South Shields. She was refloated and completed her voyage. |
| Prince Edward | United Kingdom | The ship ran aground off North Shields, Northumberland. She was refloated. |
| William | United Kingdom | The ship's crew abandoned their vessel in the Atlantic as being leaky, much damaged, and in want of provisions; she had left Hull on 28 November, bound for New York. Hyder Ally, also New York-bound, took off the crew. However, eight men from Hyder Ally volunteered to try to bring William in to a port. William arrived at Newport, Rhode Island on 10 March. |
| Unnamed | Netherlands | The smack was wrecked on the North Haaks Bank, in the North Sea off Den Helder, North Holland. |

=== 28 February ===
List of shipwrecks: 28 February 1817
| Ship | State | Description |
|---|---|---|
| Ant | United Kingdom | The ship was wrecked on Hooge, Duchy of Holstein. She was on a voyage from Great Yarmouth, Norfolk, to the Firth of Forth. |
| Drie Gesusters | Netherlands | The ship was driven ashore on Scharhörn, Hamburg and was abandoned by her crew. She was on a voyage from London, United Kingdom to Amsterdam, North Holland. She was later taken in to Cuxhaven. |
| Rose | United Kingdom | The schooner foundered in the Atlantic Ocean off Cape St. Vincent, Portugal. Her crew survived. She was on a voyage from Falmouth, Cornwall, to Seville, Spain. |

=== Unknown date ===
List of shipwrecks: Unknown date in February 1817
| Ship | State | Description |
|---|---|---|
| Brothers | United Kingdom | The ship struck a rock and sank. She was on a voyage from Gothenburg, Sweden, to Montrose, Forfarshire. |
| Commerce | Sweden | The brig was set afire and destroyed at Cagliari, Sardinia, on the orders to the Board of Health as several crewmen had died of disease on her voyage from Alexandria, Egypt. She was bound for Livorno, Grand Duchy of Tuscany. |
| Constant | Portugal | The ship was wrecked near the Cordouan Lighthouse, Gironde, France, with the loss of all but two of her crew in mid-February. She was on a voyage from Brazil to Bordeaux, Gironde. |
| Eolus | Russia | The ship was driven ashore and severely damaged in Cádiz Bay. She was on a voyage from Riga to Cádiz, Spain. |
| Friends | United Kingdom | The ship was driven ashore at Porthleven, Cornwall. She was on a voyage from Dublin to Liverpool, Lancashire. |
| Haywood | United Kingdom | The packet ship departed from Ceylon for Madras, India. No further trace, presumed foundered with the loss of all hands. |
| Hercules | Hamburg | The ship was driven ashore near Havana, Cuba. |
| Hope | United Kingdom | The ship departed from Trieste for Bremen. No further trace, presumed foundered with the loss of all hands. |
| Iris | United Kingdom | The ship foundered in Liverpool Bay off Formby, Lancashire, with the loss of all hands. She was on a voyage from Great Yarmouth to Liverpool. |
| Isabella | United States | The ship was wrecked on the Morant Cays. She was on a voyage from Jamaica to Philadelphia, Pennsylvania. |
| Kingsmoor | United Kingdom | The ship was wrecked at the mouth of the River Duddon. Her crew survived. She was on a voyage from Liverpool to Pernambuco, Brazil. |
| Lord Forbes | United Kingdom | The ship was driven ashore and severely damaged. She was on a voyage from London to Bengal, India. She was refloated and completed her voyage, arriving on 22 February. |
| Moson | United Kingdom | The ship was driven ashore near Demerara in late February. She was on a voyage from St. Andrews, New Brunswick, British North America, to Demerara. She was refloated in early April and taken in to Demerara. |
| Peter | (Spain) East Florida | The ship was wrecked off Bermuda. |
| Thomas Plummer | United Kingdom | The ship was lost near Jamaica in early February. Her crew were rescued. She was on a voyage from Jamaica to London. |
| Tiger | United Kingdom | The ship was driven ashore near Gravesend, Kent. She was on a voyage from London to Constantinople and Smyrna, Ottoman Empire. She was later refloated and put into Northfleet, Kent, for repairs. |
| Sally | United Kingdom | The ship was lost in St Brides Bay. Her crew were rescued. She was on a voyage from Cardigan to Waterford. |
| Venus | United Kingdom | The ship foundered in the Irish Sea off Peel, Isle of Man before 11 February with the loss of all on board. She was on a voyage from Belfast, County Antrim, to Liverpool. |
| Unnamed | Flag unknown | Three men from an unrecorded shipwreck in Mount's Bay were buried at Mullion, Cornwall. |

== March ==
=== 1 March ===
List of shipwrecks: 1 March 1817
| Ship | State | Description |
|---|---|---|
| Shipwright | United Kingdom | The ship foundered in the North Sea off Sunderland, County Durham. Her crew were rescued. She was on a voyage from Hull, Yorkshire, to Newcastle-upon-Tyne, Northumberland. |
| William Hounders | United Kingdom | The schooner was driven ashore in the Bay of Watersay. |

=== 2 March ===
List of shipwrecks: 2 March 1817
| Ship | State | Description |
|---|---|---|
| Brothers | United Kingdom | The ship foundered in the Gulf of Genoa 14 nautical miles (26 km) off Livorno, Grand Duchy of Tuscany with the loss of all hands. She was on a voyage from Livorno to Liverpool, Lancashire. |
| Christina Elizabeth | Sweden | The ship was lost off Texel, North Holland, Netherlands. She was on a voyage from Sligo and Cork, United Kingdom to Uddevalla. |
| Crown | United Kingdom | The ship was wrecked off the Isle of May, Fife. Her crew were rescued. She was on a voyage from Gainsborough, Lincolnshire, to Leith, Lothian. |
| Harlequin | United Kingdom | The ship was struck by lightning and was abandoned off Morlaix, Finistère, France and was abandoned with the loss of twelve of her fifteen crew. She was on a voyage from Lisbon, Portugal, to London. |

=== 3 March ===
List of shipwrecks: 3 March 1817
| Ship | State | Description |
|---|---|---|
| Mary and Margaret | United Kingdom | The sloop sank at Leith, Lothian, during a gale. She was on a voyage from Leith to Drogheda, County Louth. |
| Mary Anna | Netherlands | The ship was driven ashore and wrecked on the Enkuyser Sand. She was on a voyage from Narva, Russia, to Amsterdam, North Holland. |
| Nelly | United Kingdom | The sloop sank at Leith during a gale. |
| Prince Regent | United Kingdom | The brig, from Turk's Island, with salt, was wrecked at Havana, Cuba. |
| West Point | United Kingdom | The ship was driven ashore near Bangor, County Down. She was later refloated and taken in to the Belfast Lough. |
| Young Friend | United Kingdom | The ship sprang a leak and foundered in the North Sea off Flamborough Head, Yorkshire. Her crew survived. |
| Three unnamed vessels | United Kingdom | The sloops sank at Leith in a gale. |
| Unnamed | United States | The ship was wrecked at Banna Strand, County Kerry, United Kingdom. The wreck was plundered by the local inhabitants. |

=== 4 March ===
List of shipwrecks: 4 March 1817
| Ship | State | Description |
|---|---|---|
| Britannia | United Kingdom | The ship was driven ashore in Bootle Bay. She was on a voyage from Wexford to Liverpool, Lancashire. |
| Jong Jacob | Netherlands | The ship was driven ashore on Texel, North Holland. She was on a voyage from Amsterdam, North Holland, to Demerara. |
| Jong Pieter Jacobus | Netherlands | The ship was driven ashore on Texel. She was on a voyage from Amsterdam to London, United Kingdom. |
| Kitty | United Kingdom | The sloop was driven ashore at Whitehaven, Cumberland. She was on a voyage from Youghall, County Cork to Belfast, County Antrim. |
| Maria Christiana | Netherlands | The ship was driven ashore on Texel. She was on a voyage from London to Amsterdam. |
| Rosetta | United States | The ship was wrecked at Ocracoke, North Carolina. Her crew were rescued. She was on a voyage from New York to Ocracoke. |
| Samuel | United Kingdom | The ship was wrecked on the Île d'Oléron, Charente-Maritime, France. She was on a voyage from the Charente to London. |

=== 5 March ===
List of shipwrecks: 5 March 1817
| Ship | State | Description |
|---|---|---|
| Anarcharsis | France | The ship was driven ashore near Nantes, Loire-Inférieure and abandoned by her crew. She was on a voyage from Buenos Aires to Nantes. Anarcharsis was later refloated. |
| Georgianna | United Kingdom | The ship was driven ashore near Vlissingen, Zeeland, Netherlands. She was refloated. |

=== 6 March ===
List of shipwrecks: 6 March 1817
| Ship | State | Description |
|---|---|---|
| Eliza | United Kingdom | The ship was wrecked on the Schowen Flats, in the North Sea. |
| Fortitude | United Kingdom | The ship lost her rudder in the North Sea off Ostend, West Flanders, Netherlands and was abandoned by her crew. She was on a voyage from Ostend to London. The wreck came ashore at Vlissingen, Zeeland, Netherlands. |
| Hope | United Kingdom | The ship was wrecked on the Schowen Flats with the loss of all hands. |

=== 7 March ===
List of shipwrecks: 7 March 1817
| Ship | State | Description |
|---|---|---|
| Howland | United States | The full-rigged ship was driven ashore near "Bremerlee". |
| Kingsmill | United Kingdom | The ship ran aground of the Devil's Bank, in the River Mersey. She was on a voyage from Bengal, India to Liverpool, Lancashire, United Kingdom. She was refloated and taken in to Liverpool. |
| Peggy | United Kingdom | The ship ran aground on the Swine Bottoms. She was on a voyage from Kincardine to Pillau, Prussia. She was refloated and put in to Copenhagen, Denmark for repairs. |

=== 8 March ===
List of shipwrecks: 8 March 1817
| Ship | State | Description |
|---|---|---|
| Christopher | United Kingdom | The ship was abandoned in the Irish Sea. She was on a voyage from Dublin to Newry, County Down. |

=== 10 March ===
List of shipwrecks: 10 March 1817
| Ship | State | Description |
|---|---|---|
| Ann | United Kingdom | The brig was driven ashore near Mount Batten, Devon. She was on a voyage from Teignmouth, Devon to Liverpool, Lancashire. She was refloated. |
| Ann | United Kingdom | The ship was abandoned in the North Sea. She was on a voyage from Poole, Dorset, to Hull, Yorkshire. Ann was later taken in to Hellevoet, South Holland, Netherlands. |
| Speculator | United Kingdom | The ship was lost on Goeree, South Holland. She was on a voyage from Cette, Hérault, France to Rotterdam, South Holland. |
| Supply | United Kingdom | The ship was driven ashore on Eierland, North Holland, Netherlands. She was on a voyage from Plymouth, Devon, to Sunderland, County Durham. |

=== 11 March ===
List of shipwrecks: 11 March 1817
| Ship | State | Description |
|---|---|---|
| Rock | United Kingdom | The ship ran aground on the Brake Sand, in the North Sea off the coast of Kent. She was on a voyage from London to Livorno, Grand Duchy of Tuscany. She was refloated and put in to Ramsgate, Kent. |
| Teilkina Bolte | Netherlands | The ship was wrecked at Heligoland. Her crew were rescued. |

=== 12 March ===
List of shipwrecks: 12 March 1817
| Ship | State | Description |
|---|---|---|
| Aurora | United Kingdom | The ship was driven ashore and wrecked near Gothenburg, Sweden. Her crew were rescued. She was on a voyage from Leith, Lothian, to "Holbeck". |
| Bachelor | United Kingdom | The ship was driven ashore and wrecked near Gothenburg. Her crew were rescued. She was on a voyage from Leith to Riga, Russia. |
| Economy | United Kingdom | The ship was driven ashore and wrecked near Gothenburg. Her crew were rescued. She was on a voyage from South Shields, County Durham, to a Baltic port. |
| Unnamed | Hamburg | The ship was wrecked on the coast of East Florida. Her crew were rescued. She was on a voyage from St. Ubes, Portugal to Savannah, Georgia, United States. |

=== 13 March ===
List of shipwrecks: 13 March 1817
| Ship | State | Description |
|---|---|---|
| Brothers | United Kingdom | The ship was lost near Engelholm Bay, Sweden. She was on a voyage from King's Lynn, Norfolk, to Memel, Prussia. |
| Diana | United Kingdom | The ship was wrecked on Skagen, Denmark. Her crew were rescued. She was on a voyage from Hull, Yorkshire, to Memel. |
| Fortuna | United Kingdom | The ship foundered in the Mediterranean Sea 20 nautical miles (37 km) from "Villa Nova", Spain. She was on a voyage from Gibraltar to Genoa, Kingdom of Sardinia. |

=== 15 March ===
List of shipwrecks: 15 March 1817
| Ship | State | Description |
|---|---|---|
| Blagdon | United Kingdom | The ship struck rocks south of Sunderland, County Durham and was damaged. She put in to Sunderland. |
| Julian | United Kingdom | The ship was wrecked on St. Anastasia Island. All on board were rescued. She was on a voyage from St. Ubes, Portugal to Savannah, Georgia, United States. |

=== 16 March ===
List of shipwrecks: 16 March 1817
| Ship | State | Description |
|---|---|---|
| William | United Kingdom | The ship was driven ashore near Selsey, Sussex. She was on a voyage from London to Falmouth, Cornwall. She was refloated with assistance and taken in to Chichester, Sussex. |

=== 18 March ===
List of shipwrecks: 18 March 1817
| Ship | State | Description |
|---|---|---|
| Emperor of Russia | United States | The ship was wrecked in the Currituck Inlet. Her crew were rescued. She was on a voyage from Amsterdam, North Holland, Netherlands to Baltimore, Maryland. |
| Nautilus | United Kingdom | The ship was wrecked near Quillebeuf-sur-Seine, Eure, France. Her crew were rescued. |

=== 19 March ===
List of shipwrecks: 19 March 1817
| Ship | State | Description |
|---|---|---|
| Bulberry | United Kingdom | The ship was driven ashore near Hoylake, Lancashire. |
| Mary | United Kingdom | The ship was driven ashore at Whitehaven, Cumberland. She was on a voyage from Liverpool, Lancashire, to Belfast, County Antrim. Mary was refloated on 22 March and taken in to Whitehaven. |
| Mary Ann | United Kingdom | The ship struck a rock and foundered off Islay. Her crew were rescued. |

=== 20 March ===
List of shipwrecks: 20 March 1817
| Ship | State | Description |
|---|---|---|
| Endeavour | United Kingdom | The ship was wrecked at Whitby, Yorkshire, with the loss of all hands. |
| Fanny | United Kingdom | The sloop was wrecked on the Hoyle Bank, in Liverpool Bay. |
| Inverness & Cromarty Packet | United Kingdom | The ship was driven ashore at Bowmore, Islay, Inner Hebrides. She was on a voyage from Glasgow, Renfrewshire, to a port on the west coast of Ireland. |
| Lord Wellington | United Kingdom | The brig was driven ashore and wrecked at Ardbeg, Islay. Her crew were rescued. She was on a voyage from Liverpool to Bremen. |
| Mary | United Kingdom | The sloop was wrecked in the Sound of Islay. Her crew were rescued. |
| San Domingo | United Kingdom | The ship was driven ashore in the River Wye. She was on a voyage from Ross-on-Wye, Herefordshire, to Liverpool. San Domingo was refloated on 21 March and put back to Ross-on-Wye for repairs. |

=== 21 March ===
List of shipwrecks: 21 March 1817
| Ship | State | Description |
|---|---|---|
| Cochran | United Kingdom | The ship was driven ashore and wrecked at Culdaff, County Donegal. She was on a voyage from Glasgow, Renfrewshire, to Londonderry |
| Diana | Sweden | The ship was wrecked off "Blackness". Her crew were rescued. She was on a voyage from Bremen to Calais, France. |
| Jane | United Kingdom | The ship ran aground off Kildalling, Argyllshire, and sank. She was on a voyage from Leith, Lothian, to Belfast, County Antrim. |
| Onderneeming | Netherlands | The ship was driven ashore near Calais. She was on a voyage from Amsterdam to Rouen, Seine-Inférieure, France. |
| Prince Town | United Kingdom | The whaler ran aground on a reef at Ilha Grande, Brazil and was severely damaged. She was on a voyage from the South Seas to London. Prince Town was later refloated and taken in to Ilha Grande. |
| Rebecca | United States | The ship was abandoned in the Atlantic Ocean. She was on a voyage from Boston, Massachusetts, to Baltimore, Maryland. |
| Wick and Cromarty | United Kingdom | The sloop struck a rock and sank in Loch Indaal. |

=== 22 March ===
List of shipwrecks: 22 March 1817
| Ship | State | Description |
|---|---|---|
| Guardian | United Kingdom | The ship ran aground at Plymouth, Devon. She was on a voyage from Rio de Janeiro, United Kingdom of Portugal, Brazil and the Algarves to London. Guardian' was refloated and taken in to Plymouth in a leaky condition. She was placed under repair. |
| Industry | United States | The ship was wrecked in the Abaco Islands. |
| Isabella | United Kingdom | The ship was run down and sunk in the Irish Sea by Lancaster (United States). All on board were rescued by Lancaster. Isabella was on a voyage from Glasgow, Renfrewshire, to Jamaica. |
| Vreede | Netherlands | The ship was driven ashore near Calais, France. She was on a voyage from Amsterdam, North Holland, to Batavia, Netherlands East Indies. |

=== 23 March ===
List of shipwrecks: 23 March 1817
| Ship | State | Description |
|---|---|---|
| Adventure | United Kingdom | The ship was driven ashore at Plymouth, Devon. She was on a voyage from London to Plymouth. She was refloated. |
| Anna Maria | United States | The ship was wrecked on the Bason Reef, off the coast of East Florida. Her crew were rescued. She was on a voyage from New Orleans, Louisiana, to Philadelphia, Pennsylvania. |
| Emily | (United Kingdom of Great Britain and Ireland) British North America | The ship was abandoned in the Atlantic Ocean (34°39′N 20°00′W). Her crew were rescued by Olive Branch ( United Kingdom). Emily was on a voyage from Trinidad to New York, United States. |
| Natchez Belle | United States | The ship was wrecked in the Abaco Islands. Her crew were rescued. She was on a voyage from New York to New Orleans. |
| Rose | United Kingdom | The ship collided with a wreck and foundered in the Atlantic Ocean 8 leagues (24 nautical miles (44 km)) off Cape St. Vincent, Portugal and foundered. Her crew survived. She was on a voyage from Falmouth, Cornwall, to Seville, Spain. |

=== 24 March ===
List of shipwrecks: 24 March 1817
| Ship | State | Description |
|---|---|---|
| Jupiter | United States | The ship was wrecked at Savannah, Georgia. She was on a voyage from Havana, Cuba, to Savannah. |

=== 25 March ===
List of shipwrecks: 25 March 1817
| Ship | State | Description |
|---|---|---|
| Ann | United Kingdom | The ship was wrecked on the Sandhammer Reef. Her crew were rescued. She was on a voyage from Memel, Prussia to London. |
| Mary | United Kingdom | The ship was wrecked at Santa María la Antigua del Darién whilst leaving that port for Liverpool, Lancashire. |

=== 26 March ===
List of shipwrecks: 26 March 1817
| Ship | State | Description |
|---|---|---|
| Blessing | United Kingdom | The ship was driven ashore near Southport, Lancashire. She was on a voyage from London to Liverpool, Lancashire. |

=== 27 March ===
List of shipwrecks: 27 March 1817
| Ship | State | Description |
|---|---|---|
| Miriam | United States | The ship was wrecked on Heneaga. She was on a voyage from Baltimore, Maryland, to Jamaica. |
| Royal Jubilee | United Kingdom | The ship was lost on the Gunfleet Sand, in the North Sea off the coast of Essex. She was on a voyage from Sunderland, County Durham, to London. |

=== 29 March ===
List of shipwrecks: 29 March 1817
| Ship | State | Description |
|---|---|---|
| Mary and Matilda | United Kingdom | The ship was wrecked on the coast of Sicily. She was on a voyage from Sicily to London. |

=== 31 March ===
List of shipwrecks: 31 March 1817
| Ship | State | Description |
|---|---|---|
| Diana | Sweden | The ship was wrecked off Memel, Prussia. She was on a voyage from Stralsund to Memel. |

=== Unknown date ===
List of shipwrecks: Unknown date in March 1817
| Ship | State | Description |
|---|---|---|
| Anna Margaretha | Sweden | The ship was driven ashore on the coast of Jutland. Her crew were rescued. She was on a voyage from Stockholm to London, United Kingdom. |
| Conception | France | The brig was lost off "Grand River" before 14 March. |
| Drie Gebroeders | Netherlands | The ship foundered in the North Sea off the coast of Groningen at the end of March. She was on a voyage from Bergen, Norway, to Amsterdam, North Holland. |
| Edmund | United Kingdom of the Netherlands | The ship was lost whilst on a voyage from Amsterdam to Riga, Russia. |
| Eliza | United Kingdom | The ship foundered at the mouth of the Eider. Her crew were rescued. |
| Eliza | United Kingdom | The ship foundered whilst on a voyage from Calcutta, India, to Île de France, Mauritius. |
| Frederick Maria | United Kingdom | The ship foundered whilst on a voyage from Calcutta to Île de France. |
| Goliah | France | The ship foundered off Savannah, Georgia, United States. |
| Hector | United Kingdom | The ship was driven ashore at Domesnes, Norway. She was on a voyage from Newcastle upon Tyne, Northumberland to Riga, Russia. She was refloated and completed her voyage, arriving on 22 March. |
| Helen | United Kingdom | The ship was lost near Wangerooge. Her crew were rescued. She was on a voyage from Leith, Lothian, to Groningen, Netherlands |
| Hero | United Kingdom | The ship was wrecked on Staple Island, Northumberland Her crew were rescued. |
| Heywood Packed | United Kingdom | The ship is presumed to have foundered whilst on a voyage from Ceylon to Madras, India. |
| Hope | United Kingdom | The ship foundered at the mouth of the Eider with the loss of all hands. |
| Jumbo | United Kingdom | The ship was wrecked at Whitehaven, Cumberland. Her crew were rescued. She was on a voyage from the Isle of Man to Whitehaven. |
| Lord Duncan | United Kingdom | The ship was driven ashore near Gallipoli, Ottoman Empire, in late March. She was on a voyage from Constantinople, Ottoman Empire, to Genoa, Kingdom of Sardinia. She was later refloated and arrived at Genoa on 10 March. |
| Mary and Francis | United States | The ship was driven ashore and wrecked at Cape Hatteras, North Carolina. She was on a voyage from Madeira, Portugal, to Baltimore, Maryland. |
| Mauritius | United Kingdom | The ship sprang a leak and foundered in the Indian Ocean off Trincomalee, Ceylon before 24 March. Her crew were rescued. She was on a voyage from Bengal to Bombay, India. |
| Nancy | United Kingdom | The ship was wrecked at Georgetown, British Guiana. She was on a voyage from Jamaica to Georgetown. |
| Phoebe | United Kingdom | The ship was lost off the mouth of the Rampart River. |
| Royal Union | United Kingdom | The ship was driven ashore on Saaremaa, Russia. She was on a voyage from Newcastle upon Tyne, Northumberland, to Riga Royal Union was later refloated and resumed her voyage. |
| Success | United Kingdom | The ship was lost near Troon, Ayrshire. |
| Triumph | United Kingdom | The ship ran aground and was wrecked at Dungarvan, County Waterford. She was on a voyage from Liverpool to Dungarvan. |
| Vrow Engelina | Hamburg | The ship foundered off Texel, North Holland, with the loss of all hands. She was on a voyage from Calais, France, to Hamburg. |
| William | United Kingdom | The ship departed from Newcastle upon Tyne, Northumberland, for Liverpool in late March. No further trace, presumed foundered with the loss of all hands. |
| Unnamed | Sweden | The galiot was lost off Port Mahon, Spain. Four of her crew were rescued. |
| Unnamed | Hamburg | The ship was wrecked on the coast of Cuba in early March. |
| Unnamed | United Kingdom | The ship was wrecked on Barra, Outer Hebrides. Her crew were rescued, but four rescuers died when their boat capsized. |

== April ==
=== 4 April ===
List of shipwrecks: 4 April 1817
| Ship | State | Description |
|---|---|---|
| Noordstar | Netherlands | The ship was wrecked on the Long Sand, in the North Sea with the loss of three of her crew. She was on a voyage from Amsterdam, North Holland, to Dunkerque, Nord, France. |
| Rising States | United States | The ship was wrecked off the Charleston Lighthouse, South Carolina. Her crew were rescued. She was on a voyage from Wilmington, Delaware, to Charleston. |
| Telegraph | United Kingdom | The paddle steamer suffered a boiler explosion at Norwich, Norfolk. Ten of the 22 people on board were killed, five were injured. She was on a voyage from Norwich to Great Yarmouth, Norfolk. |

=== 6 April ===
List of shipwrecks: 6 April 1817
| Ship | State | Description |
|---|---|---|
| Leonora | France | The ship was driven ashore and wrecked at Calais. Her seven crew were rescued by a pinnace belonging to HMS Royal Sovereign (Royal Navy). Leonora was on a voyage from Marseille, Bouches-du-Rhône, to Dunkerque, Nord. |

=== 7 April ===
List of shipwrecks: 7 April 1817
| Ship | State | Description |
|---|---|---|
| Hirondelle | France | The ship foundered in the Bay of Biscay off Belle Île, Morbihan. She was on a voyage from Boulogne, Pas-de-Calais to Bordeaux, Gironde. |
| William and Nancy | United Kingdom | The ship foundered in the English Channel off The Lizard, Cornwall. Her crew were rescued. |

=== 9 April ===
List of shipwrecks: 9 April 1817
| Ship | State | Description |
|---|---|---|
| Diogenes | Stettin | The ship was driven ashore near "Hornbech". She was on a voyage from Stettin to Amsterdam, North Holland, Netherlands. |
| Mary and Martha | United Kingdom | The ship foundered in the English Channel off The Lizard, Cornwall. Her crew were rescued. She was on a voyage from Plymouth, Devon, to Penzance, Cornwall. |
| Unnamed | Netherlands | The sloop was driven ashore and wrecked at Esselmonde, South Holland with the loss of four lives. |

=== 10 April ===
List of shipwrecks: 10 April 1817
| Ship | State | Description |
|---|---|---|
| Whig | United Kingdom | The ship was driven ashore on the north French coast. |

=== 14 April ===
List of shipwrecks: 14 April 1817
| Ship | State | Description |
|---|---|---|
| Diana | United Kingdom | The ship departed from "Raswog", Norway for Newcastle-upon-Tyne, Northumberland. No further trace, presumed foundered in the North Sea with the loss of all hands. |
| Henry, and Venus | United Kingdom | The ships collided off the Haisborough Sands, in the North Sea off the coast of Norfolk and were both severely damaged. They both put in tob Great Yarmouth, Norfolk. |
| Minerva | (United Kingdom of Great Britain and Ireland) Jersey | The ship was driven ashore at Jersey. She was on a voyage from Messina, Kingdom of the Two Sicilies to Jersey. |
| William | United Kingdom | The ship struck rocks off Penmarc'h, Finistère, France and sank. Her crew were rescued. She was on a voyage from Torquay, Devon, to Le Croisic, Loire-Inférieure, France and Newfoundland, British North America. |

=== 15 April ===
List of shipwrecks: 15 April 1817
| Ship | State | Description |
|---|---|---|
| Dolphin | United Kingdom | The ship foundered in the North Sea off Domesnes, Norway. Her crew were rescued. She was on a voyage from Sunderland, County Durham, to Christiana, Norway. |
| Pulmantee | United Kingdom | The ship was driven ashore at Saint-Vaast-la-Hogue, Manche, France. She was on a voyage from Cardiff, Glamorgan to Caen, Calvados, France. She was later refloated and taken in to Saint-Vaast-la-Hogue. |
| Rebecca | United Kingdom | The ship foundered in the North Sea off the coast of Jutland. Her crew were rescued. She was on a voyage from South Shields, County Durham, to Lübeck. |
| Royal George | United Kingdom | The ship foundered in the English Channel off Quillebeuf-sur-Seine, Eure, France. She was on a voyage from King's Lynn, Norfolk, to Rouen, Seine-Inférieure, France. |

=== 16 April ===
List of shipwrecks: 16 April 1817
| Ship | State | Description |
|---|---|---|
| Fisher Amis | Netherlands | The ship was driven ashore near Vlissingen, Zeeland. She was on a voyage from New York, United States, to Antwerp. Fisher Amis was later refloated. |
| Jenny | United Kingdom | The ship ran aground on the Nayland Rock, Kent. She was on a voyage from London to Jersey, Channel Islands. She was refloated and taken in to Margate, Kent. |
| Jeune Henriette | Netherlands | The ship foundered in the North Sea off Blankenberge, West Flanders. Her crew were rescued. She was on a voyage from Charleston, South Carolina, United States, to Antwerp. |
| Wellington | United Kingdom | The ship ran aground off Dunkerque, Nord, France and sank. She was on a voyage from Cardiff, Glamorgan, to Dunkerque. |
| William | United States | The ship was driven ashore and damaged on Texel, North Holland, Netherlands. She was on a voyage from Amsterdam, North Holland, to Philadelphia, Pennsylvania. William floated off in November 1818 and was taken in to Amsterdam, where she arrived on 17 November. |
| Unnamed | United Kingdom | The fishing vessel was lost off Flamborough Head, Yorkshire with the loss of all hands. |

=== 17 April ===
List of shipwrecks: 17 April 1817
| Ship | State | Description |
|---|---|---|
| Basin | United Kingdom | The ship was driven ashore at Harlingen, Friesland, Netherlands. |
| Robert Porter | United States | The ship was wrecked in the Abaco Islands. She was on a voyage from Norfolk, Virginia, to Havana, Cuba. |
| Three Gebroeders | United Kingdom | The ship was driven ashore on Texel, North Holland. She was on a voyage from Amsterdam, North Holland, to Curaçao |
| Vrow Algonda | Netherlands | The ship was driven ashore and wrecked on Texel. She was on a voyage from London, United Kingdom to Amsterdam. |
| Vrow Antje | Hanover | The ship was driven ashore on Texel. Her crew were rescued. She was on a voyage from Newcastle upon Tyne, Northumberland, United Kingdom, to Emden. |
| Unnamed | Flag unknown | The ship was wrecked at "Minden", Netherlands. All on board were rescued. |

=== 18 April ===
List of shipwrecks: 18 April 1817
| Ship | State | Description |
|---|---|---|
| Chub | United Kingdom | The brig was captured at Corisco, Portuguese Guinea, by the crew of a Portuguese schooner and crewed by a number of black slaves. She was subsequently driven ashore and wrecked. |

=== 19 April ===
List of shipwrecks: 19 April 1817
| Ship | State | Description |
|---|---|---|
| Hannah | United States | The ship was driven ashore and wrecked at Tom's River, New Jersey. Her crew were rescued, She was on a voyage from São Miguel Island, Azores, to New York. |
| Karen and Anna | Netherlands | The ship ran aground in the Vlie and was wrecked. |

=== 20 April ===
List of shipwrecks: 20 April 1817
| Ship | State | Description |
|---|---|---|
| Cunningham Boyle | United Kingdom | The ship foundered off Anholt, Denmark. Her crew were rescued. She was on a voyage from Copenhagen to Aalborg, Denmark. |
| Mary | United Kingdom | The ship was driven ashore near "Herscholts". Her crew were rescued. |

=== 24 April ===
List of shipwrecks: 24 April 1817
| Ship | State | Description |
|---|---|---|
| Two Brothers | United Kingdom | The ship foundered in the Atlantic Ocean (44°46′N 40°40′W) with the loss of ten of her thirteen crew. Survivors were rescued by Wellesley (United Kingdom), which lost three of her crew whilst carrying out the rescue. Two Brothers was on a voyage from Maranhão, Brazil to London. |
| St. Christo | Portugal | The ship capsized in a squall with the loss of eleven lives. She was on a voyage from Faial Island, Azores, to Lisbon. |

=== 25 April ===
List of shipwrecks: 25 April 1817
| Ship | State | Description |
|---|---|---|
| Active | Portugal | The ship was destroyed by fire in the Tagus. |
| Charlotte | United Kingdom | The ship was driven ashore near New York, United States, and was abandoned by her crew. She was on a voyage from Montserrat to New York. Charlotte was later refloated. |
| Mary | United Kingdom | The ship was driven ashore near Ostend, West Flanders, Netherlands. Her crew were rescued. She was on a voyage from London to Ostend. Mary was later refloated and taken in to Ostend. |
| Nelson | United Kingdom | The ship ran aground in the Swine Bottoms. She was on a voyage from Chester, Cheshire to Riga, Russia. She was refloated. |
| Neptunus | Russia | The ship foundered in the Baltic Sea off Pillau, Prussia with the loss of all but one of her crew. She was on a voyage from Liverpool, Lancashire, United Kingdom to Saint Petersburg. |
| Regulation | United Kingdom | The ship was driven ashore at Hell Gate, New York. She was on a voyage from Saint John, New Brunswick, British North America, to New York. |

=== 26 April ===
List of shipwrecks: 26 April 1817
| Ship | State | Description |
|---|---|---|
| Charlotte | United States | The ship was driven ashore at New York City and was abandoned by her crew. She was on a voyage from Montserrat to New York. She was later refloated. |
| London | United Kingdom | The ship foundered in the Davis Straits with the loss of all 46 crew. |

=== 28 April ===
List of shipwrecks: 28 April 1817
| Ship | State | Description |
|---|---|---|
| Sol Resplendescente | Spain | The ship departed from the Rio Grande on this date. No further trace, presumed foundered with the loss of all hands. She was on a voyage from Rio de Janeiro to Antwerp, Netherlands. |

=== 29 April ===
List of shipwrecks: 29 April 1817
| Ship | State | Description |
|---|---|---|
| Chacabuco | Spain | The privateer was wrecked on the Chico Bank, off the coast of present-day Argentina. |

=== Unknown date ===
List of shipwrecks: Unknown date in April 1817
| Ship | State | Description |
|---|---|---|
| Bee | United Kingdom | The ship foundered off the Mersle Bank, in the English Channel off the French coast. Her crew were rescued. |
| Die Nye Prove | Flag unknown | The ship was lost off Hogland, Russia. |
| Dolphin | United Kingdom | The ship was wrecked on the Ooster Sandbank, in the North Sea. She was on a voyage from Ramsgate, Kent, to Rotterdam, South Holland, Netherlands. |
| Doris | Bremen | The ship was driven ashore near Memel, Prussia. She was on a voyage from Windau to Amsterdam, North Holland, Netherlands. |
| Edmond | France | The ship was wrecked on the French coast. She was on a voyage from Morlaix, Finistère to Bordeaux, Gironde. |
| Elizabeth Hill | United Kingdom | The ship was driven ashore in the Dardanelles in mid-April. She was on a voyage from Odesa, Russia, to Genoa, Kingdom of Sardinia. Elizabeth Hill was later refloated. |
| Erik | Denmark | The ship was wrecked near Helsingør with the loss of all hands. |
| Fanny | United Kingdom | The ship foundered in the Irish Sea off Black Head, County Antrim, with the loss of all hands. She was on a voyage from Galway to Belfast, County Antrim. |
| Favourite | United Kingdom | The ship foundered off Skyros with the loss of all but three of her crew. She was on a voyage from Odesa, Russia, to Genoa, Kingdom of Sardinia. |
| Fortitude | United Kingdom | The ship was lost off the Dardanelles in mid-April. She was on a voyage from Odesa, Russia, to Genoa. |
| Generoso | Grand Duchy of Tuscany | The ship was wrecked at Porto d'Anzio, Papal States She was on a voyage from Livorno to Naples, Kingdom of the Two Sicilies. |
| Infante | Spanish Navy | The troopship was wrecked on the north coast of Cuba. All on board were rescued. She was on a voyage from Cádiz to Havana, Cuba. |
| Louisa | United States | The ship was wrecked in the Abaco Islands. She was on a voyage from Philadelphia, Pennsylvania, to Havana. |
| Minerva | United Kingdom | The ship was driven ashore at Gothenburg, Sweden, in early April. She was on a voyage from a Baltic port to Liverpool, Lancashire.Minerva was later refloated with the assistance of divers. |
| Onderneeming | Netherlands | The ship foundered in the North Sea. Her crew were rescued. She was on a voyage from London, United Kingdom to Amsterdam, North Holland. |
| Rolla | United States | The ship was wrecked on the Saranella Reef. Her crew were rescued. |
| Satisfaction | France | The ship was beached on Texel, North Holland. She was on a voyage from Bordeaux, Gironde to Danzig. |
| Sisters | United Kingdom | The ship was lost near Reval, Russia, in mid-April. Her crew were rescued. |
| Trio | United Kingdom | The ship was lost whilst on a voyage from Cape Henry, Virginia, United States, to Trieste. Her crew were rescued. |
| Twee Gebroeders | Netherlands | The ship was wrecked on Goree Island, South Holland. She was on a voyage from Cherbourg, Seine-Inférieure, France to Rotterdam. |

== May ==
=== 1 May ===
List of shipwrecks: 1 May 1817
| Ship | State | Description |
|---|---|---|
| Cornwall | United Kingdom | The ship ran aground on the Brake Sand, in the North Sea off the cost of Kent. She was on a voyage from London to India. She was refloated, and resumed her voyage the next day. |

=== 4 May ===
List of shipwrecks: 4 May 1817
| Ship | State | Description |
|---|---|---|
| Rising States | United States | The ship was wrecked near the Charleston Lighthouse. Her crew were rescued. She was on a voyage from Wilmington, Delaware, to Charleston, South Carolina. |
| St. Anthony | Malta | The ship foundered in the Mediterranean Sea off Monaco. Her crew were rescued. She was on a voyage from Malta to Messina, Sicily and Monacio. |

=== 5 May ===
List of shipwrecks: 5 May 1817
| Ship | State | Description |
|---|---|---|
| Marquês de Poimbal | Portugal | The ship, which had been captured in March by the insurgent privateer Patriola (Argentina), was deliberately wrecked on the Florida Reef.Marquês de Poimbal was on a voyage from Pernambuco, Brazil, to Oporto. |

=== 6 May ===
List of shipwrecks: 6 May 1817
| Ship | State | Description |
|---|---|---|
| Rose in Bloom | United Kingdom | The ship was lost near Savannah, Georgia, United States. She was on a voyage from New Orleans, Louisiana, to Amsterdam, North Holland, Netherlands. |
| Success | United Kingdom | The ship ran aground on the Shipwash Sand, in the North Sea off the coast of Essex. She was on a voyage from South Shields, County Durham to London. She was refloated and put in to Harwich, Essex in a severely leaky condition. |
| Weischell | Danzig | The ship struck a rock and foundered off Lerwick, Shetland Islands, United Kingdom. Her crew were rescued. She was on a voyage from Danzig to Liverpool, Lancashire, United Kingdom. |

=== 7 May ===
List of shipwrecks: 7 May 1817
| Ship | State | Description |
|---|---|---|
| Germania | Hamburg | The ship ran aground on the Goodwin Sands, Kent, United Kingdom. She was on a voyage from Hamburg to Oporto, Portugal. She was refloated with assistance and taken in to Ramsgate, Kent. |
| Jean | United Kingdom | The ship ran aground off Læsø, Denmark. She was on a voyage from London to Fredericia, Denmark. |
| Lord Eldon | United Kingdom | The ship was driven ashore and severely damaged at Kirkwall, Orkney Islands. She was on a voyage from Sunderland, County Durham, to Quebec City, Lower Canada, British North America. Lord Eldon was later refloated. |
| Weldoen | Flag unknown | The ship was in collision with Emanuel (Flag unknown) and sank with the loss of three of her crew. She was on a voyage from Leith, Lothian, United Kingdom to a Baltic port. |

=== 8 May ===
List of shipwrecks: 8 May 1817
| Ship | State | Description |
|---|---|---|
| Cornwall | British East India Company | The East Indiaman ran aground on the Brake Sand, in the North Sea off the coast of Essex. She was later refloated and returned to service. |
| Severn | United Kingdom | The ship ran aground at Kilrush, County Clare. She was on a voyage from Kilrush to Liverpool, Lancashire. |

=== 9 May ===
List of shipwrecks: 9 May 1817
| Ship | State | Description |
|---|---|---|
| Blessing | United Kingdom | The ship was driven ashore near Pictou, Nova Scotia, British North America. She was on a voyage from Liverpool, Lancashire, to Pictou. |

=== 10 May ===
List of shipwrecks: 10 May 1817
| Ship | State | Description |
|---|---|---|
| Eenzamheid | Duchy of Holstein | The ship foundered in the North Sea off Juist, Kingdom of Hanover. She was on a voyage from Flensburg to Amsterdam, North Holland, Netherlands. |
| Hoffnung | Netherlands | The ship was driven ashore on Cronberg Point, Denmark. She was on a voyage from Antwerp to Riga, Russia. |

=== 12 May ===
List of shipwrecks: 12 May 1817
| Ship | State | Description |
|---|---|---|
| Boston | United Kingdom | The ship was driven ashore at Liverpool, Lancashire. She was on a voyage from Alexandria, Egypt Eyalet to Liverpool. |
| Thorn | United Kingdom | The ship ran aground in the Rock Channel, in Liverpool Bay. She was on a voyage from Charleston, South Carolina, United States to Liverpool. |

=== 13 May ===
List of shipwrecks: 13 May 1817
| Ship | State | Description |
|---|---|---|
| George | (United Kingdom of Great Britain and Ireland) Jamaica | The ship was driven ashore and wrecked at Portsmouth, New Hampshire, United States. All on board were rescued. She was on a voyage from Aux Cayes, Haiti, to Portsmouth. |

=== 14 May ===
List of shipwrecks: 14 May 1817
| Ship | State | Description |
|---|---|---|
| Commerce | United Kingdom | The ship was driven ashore and wrecked at Portsmouth, New Hampshire, United States. All on board were rescued. She was on a voyage from Jamaica to New York, United States. |
| Industry | United Kingdom | The ship was lost in Derbyhaven Bay. Her crew were rescued. She was on a voyage from Youghall, County Cork to Belfast, County Antrim. |

=== 19 May ===
List of shipwrecks: 19 May 1817
| Ship | State | Description |
|---|---|---|
| Caroline | Rostock | The ship was abandoned in the Atlantic Ocean. Her crew survived. She was on a voyage from Lisbon, Portugal, to London, United Kingdom. |
| John Adams | United States | The ship was wrecked on Cape Hatteras, North Carolina. Her crew were rescued. She was on a voyage from Charleston, South Carolina, to Norfolk, Virginia. |
| Lion | United Kingdom | The brig was wrecked on the Heaps Sandbank, in the North Sea. Her crew were rescued. She was on a voyage from South Shields, County Durham, to London. |
| St. Antonio Portuguez Arujo | Portugal | The ship struck a wreck off Cape Finisterre, Spain, and was abandoned. She was on a voyage from Lisbon to Dublin, United Kingdom. |

=== 20 May ===
List of shipwrecks: 23 May 1817
| Ship | State | Description |
|---|---|---|
| John and Thomas | United Kingdom | The ship collided with an iceberg in the Atlantic Ocean (47°30′N 48°48′W) and sprang a severe leak. |

=== 23 May ===
List of shipwrecks: 23 May 1817
| Ship | State | Description |
|---|---|---|
| Vittoriosa | Kingdom of Sardinia | The brig was in collision with Jason (United Kingdom) in the Mediterranean Sea off Sardinia and foundered. Nine crew were rescued by Jason. Vittoriosa was on a voyage from Genoa to Odesa, Russia. |

=== 24 May ===
List of shipwrecks: 24 May 1817
| Ship | State | Description |
|---|---|---|
| Two Brothers | United Kingdom | The ship foundered in the Atlantic Ocean (40°40′N 40°40′W) with the loss of ten of her thirteen crew. Survivors were rescued by Wellesley (United Kingdom), which lost three of her own crew during the rescue. Two Brothers was on a voyage from Brazil to Liverpool, Lancashire. |

=== 26 May ===
List of shipwrecks: 26 May 1817
| Ship | State | Description |
|---|---|---|
| Falcon | United States | The schooner was wrecked on Anegada. |

=== 27 May ===
List of shipwrecks: 26 May 1817
| Ship | State | Description |
|---|---|---|
| Leander | United Kingdom | The ship struck rocks at South Shields, County Durham. She put back to South Shields in a severely leaky condition. |

=== 28 May ===
List of shipwrecks: 28 May 1817
| Ship | State | Description |
|---|---|---|
| Shaftsbury | United Kingdom | The ship was in collision with another vessel off Sunderland, County Durham, and was consequently beached. |

=== 29 May ===
List of shipwrecks: 29 May 1817
| Ship | State | Description |
|---|---|---|
| Stately | United Kingdom | The ship was driven ashore at Spital Point, in Berwick Bay, Northumberland. |
| Warren Hastings | United Kingdom | The ship ran aground at New Romney, Kent. She was refloated. |

=== 30 May ===
List of shipwrecks: 30 May 1817
| Ship | State | Description |
|---|---|---|
| Rolla | Portugal | The ship was driven ashore at New Orleans, Louisiana. |

=== 31 May ===
List of shipwrecks: 31 May 1817
| Ship | State | Description |
|---|---|---|
| Mari | Prussia | The ship ran aground on the Shipwash Sand, in the North Sea off the coast of Suffolk, United Kingdom. She was refloated with the assistance of the pilot cutter Eclipse (United Kingdom). |

=== Unknown date ===
List of shipwrecks: Unknown date in May 1817
| Ship | State | Description |
|---|---|---|
| Alfred | United Kingdom | The ship was wrecked at "Saint-Jacques". She was on a voyage from Bordeaux, Gironde, to Rouen, Seine-Inférieure. |
| Commodore Perry | United States | The schooner sprang a leak and was abandoned in the Atlantic Ocean before 15 May. |
| Curlew | United Kingdom | The ship was sunk by ice off Newfoundland. Her crew were rescued. She was on a voyage from Waterford to Newfoundland. |
| Dart | United Kingdom | The schooner sprang a leak at Sierra Leone. She was declared beyond repair. |
| Eliza | United Kingdom | The ship was driven ashore and wrecked at Cresswell, Northumberland. |
| Europa | United States | The ship was wrecked on the Florida Reef. She was on a voyage from St. Jago de Cuba to the United States. This ship also reported to be the captured Marquêz de Poimbal (Portugal) under an alias. |
| Felix | France | The ship sank at Havre de Grâce, Seine-Inférieure. |
| Hannah | United Kingdom | The ship was driven ashore in the Potomac River in late may. |
| Jean Marie | France | The ship was wrecked on the Samaná Peninsula, Hispaniola. Her crew were rescued. She was on a voyage from Marseille, Bouches-du-Rhône, to San Domingo. |
| John | United Kingdom | The ship was wrecked on the coast of Newfoundland. Her crew were rescued. She was on a voyage from Civita Vechia, Papal States, to Newfoundland. |
| Lion | Kingdom of the Two Sicilies | The ship was sunk by ice at Saint Petersburg, Russia, in mid-April. |
| Lord Macdonald | United Kingdom | The ship was driven ashore at Dagerort, Russia. She was on a voyage from Liverpool, Lancashire to Vyborg, Russia. She was refloated with assistance and resumed her voyage. |
| Nancy | United Kingdom | The ship was sunk by ice off the coast of Newfoundland. Her crew were rescued. She was on a voyage from Dartmouth, Devon, to Newfoundland. |
| Oneida | United States | The ship foundered in the Atlantic Ocean. Her crew were rescued. She was on a voyage from New York to Havre de Grâce, Seine-Inférieure, France. |
| Shannon | United Kingdom | The ship was wrecked on Scarpanto, Greece, before 10 May. Her crew were rescued by Quebec Packet (United Kingdom). Shannon was on a voyage from Alexandria, Egypt, to London. |
| St. Johannes | Norway | The ship struck a rock and sprang a leak. She was on a voyage from Bodø to Antwerp, Netherlands. She put in to Sumbister Bay, Shetland Islands, United Kingdom. |
| Suspense | United Kingdom | The ship ran aground on the Caicos Bank. She was on a voyage from Jamaica to London. She was refloated and put in to Nassau, Bahamas, where she arrived on 25 May. |
| Traveller | United Kingdom | The brig was reported to have foundered in the Atlantic Ocean. She was on a voyage from Leith, Lothian, to British North America. All on board, in excess of 60 people, were rescued by Valiant (United Kingdom). She was discovered in a waterlogged condition on 25 May by Balize (Flag unknown). |
| William & Jane | United Kingdom | The ship was driven ashore on Borkum, Kingdom of Hanover. She was on a voyage from Hull, Yorkshire, to Bremen. |
| Union | United Kingdom | The schooner departed from Sierra Leon for a British port. Presumed subsequently captured and her crew murdered. |

== June ==
=== 1 June ===
List of shipwrecks: 1 June 1817
| Ship | State | Description |
|---|---|---|
| Sally Ann | United Kingdom | The ship foundered off Martinique with the loss of all but three of her crew. She was on a voyage from Bristol, Gloucestershire, to Jamaica. |

=== 3 June ===
List of shipwrecks: 3 June 1817
| Ship | State | Description |
|---|---|---|
| Hanolette | France | The full-rigged ship was wrecked on the Cape of Good Hope. All on board were rescued. |
| Lady Lushington | United Kingdom | The ship ran aground in the River Thames. She was on a voyage from Bengal, India, to London. Lady Lushington was refloated on 11 June. |
| Venerable | United Kingdom | The ship was run into by the brig Louise (France) at Limehouse, Middlesex and was severely damaged. Venerable was on a voyage from London to Amsterdam, North Holland, Netherlands. |

=== 4 June ===
List of shipwrecks: 4 June 1817
| Ship | State | Description |
|---|---|---|
| Albane | Netherlands | The ship was driven ashore at Vlissingen, Zeeland. She was on a voyage from Antwerp to Martinique. Albane was later refloated. |
| Bilbiano | Spain | The ship was driven ashore and damaged at Rottingdean, Sussex, United Kingdom. She was on a voyage from London to Bilbao. Bilbiano was later refloated and taken in to Newhaven, Sussex. |
| Eliza & Peggy | United Kingdom | The ship ran aground on the Black Middens, in the North Sea off the coast of County Durham. She was on a voyage from Leith, Lothian, to South Shields, County Durham. Eliza & Peggy was later refloated and taken in to South Shields. |
| Honour | United Kingdom | The ship struck the Lemon and Ore Sand, in the North Sea and was damaged. She was on a voyage from Liverpool, Lancashire, to Danzig. Honour was later refloated and taken in to Great Yarmouth, Norfolk in a severely leaky condition. |

=== 5 June ===
List of shipwrecks: 5 June 1817
| Ship | State | Description |
|---|---|---|
| Eliza and Peggy | United Kingdom | The ship ran aground on the Black Middens, in the North Sea off the coast of County Durham. She was on a voyage from Leith, Lothian to South Shields, County Durham. She was refloated with assistance and taken in to South Shields. |
| Lively | United Kingdom | The ship sprang a leak and was abandoned in the North Sea. Her crew were rescued by Ebenezer (United Kingdom). Lively was on a voyage from Newcastle upon Tyne, Northumberland, to Bremen. |
| Mantle | United Kingdom | The ship sprang a leak. She put back to Arkhangelsk, Russia in a waterlogged condition. |

=== 6 June ===
List of shipwrecks: 6 June 1817
| Ship | State | Description |
|---|---|---|
| Minerva | France | The ship was wrecked near Quimper, Finistère. She was on a voyage from Cádiz, Spain to Havre de Grâce, Seine-Inférieure. |
| William and Ann | United Kingdom | The ship was wrecked near St. Bees Head, Cumberland with the loss of a crew member. |

=== 7 June ===
List of shipwrecks: 7 June 1817
| Ship | State | Description |
|---|---|---|
| Adventure | United Kingdom | The ship was driven ashore near Calais, France. |
| Nancy | United Kingdom | The ship was driven ashore on the coast of Belize. |

=== 8 June ===
List of shipwrecks: 8 June 1817
| Ship | State | Description |
|---|---|---|
| Three Williams | United Kingdom | The ship foundered whilst on a voyage from Liverpool, Lancashire, to Newfoundland, British North America. Her crew survived. |

=== 9 June ===
List of shipwrecks: 9 June 1817
| Ship | State | Description |
|---|---|---|
| Jane | United Kingdom | The ship was wrecked at Cape Corrientes, Cuba. All on board were rescued by Elizabeth (United Kingdom). She was on a voyage from Jamaica to Greenock, Renfrewshire. |
| Mina | Mexican insurgents | The schooner was captured by Sabina (Spanish Navy). She was set afire and sunk. |
| Revelation | United Kingdom | The ship ran aground on the Kentish Knock. She was on a voyage from King's Lynn, Norfolk to Dunkerque, Nord, France. She was refloated and taken in to Harwich, Essex in a severely leaky condition. |

=== 11 June ===
List of shipwrecks: 11 June 1817
| Ship | State | Description |
|---|---|---|
| Happy Return | United Kingdom | The sloop foundered at Port Maria, Jamaica. Her crew were rescued. |
| Helen | Norway | The ship was abandoned north west of the Shetland Islands, United Kingdom. She was on a voyage from Trondheim to Faro, Portugal. |

=== 12 June ===
List of shipwrecks: 12 June 1817
| Ship | State | Description |
|---|---|---|
| Wohlfarth | Denmark | The ship was driven ashore near Memel, Prussia. |

=== 13 June ===
List of shipwrecks: 13 June 1817
| Ship | State | Description |
|---|---|---|
| Friends | United Kingdom | The ship was driven ashore near Riga, Russia. |

=== 14 June ===
List of shipwrecks: 14 June 1817
| Ship | State | Description |
|---|---|---|
| La Generosa | Kingdom of the Two Sicilies | The felucca was attacked by pirates off Lipari with the loss of at least three lives. She was on a voyage from Lipari to "Torrenauzza". The pirates were apprehended and handed over to the authorities. |
| Pégasse | France | The ship was wrecked near Cherbourg, Seine-Inférieure with the loss of eight lives. She was on a voyage from Martinique to Havre de Grâce, Seine-Inférieure. |

=== 15 June ===
List of shipwrecks: 15 June 1817
| Ship | State | Description |
|---|---|---|
| Dispatch | United States | The schooner was wrecked on the Carysfort Reef. Her crew were rescued. She was on a voyage from Nassau, Bahamas, to Charleston, South Carolina. |

=== 18 June ===
List of shipwrecks: 18 June 1817
| Ship | State | Description |
|---|---|---|
| St. Michael | United Kingdom | The ship capsized at Arkhangelsk, Russia. |

=== 20 June ===
List of shipwrecks: 20 June 1817
| Ship | State | Description |
|---|---|---|
| Admiral Gambier | United Kingdom | The ship was wrecked on the Juan de Nava Reef, in the Mozambique Channel. Her passengers and crew survived. She was on a voyage from London to Ceylon. |
| Wansbeck | United Kingdom | The ship was driven ashore at "Lopness", Orkney Islands. She was on a voyage from Riga, Russia to Bristol, Gloucestershire. She was later refloated and completed her voyage. |

=== 22 June ===
List of shipwrecks: 22 June 1817
| Ship | State | Description |
|---|---|---|
| Eugenio | Spain | The ship capsized in a squall off the Morant Cays, Jamaica. Her crew were rescued by the full-rigged ship Ruth (United Kingdom). She was on a voyage from Kingston, Jamaica, to San Domingo. |

=== 23 June ===
List of shipwrecks: 23 June 1817
| Ship | State | Description |
|---|---|---|
| Aurora | United Kingdom | The ship capsized at St. Ives, Cornwall. |
| Hope | United Kingdom | The ship was wrecked at Arkhangelsk, Russia. |

=== 24 June ===
List of shipwrecks: 24 June 1817
| Ship | State | Description |
|---|---|---|
| Elisa | United Kingdom | The ship was driven ashore at Philadelphia, Pennsylvania, United States. |

=== 28 June ===
List of shipwrecks: 28 June 1817
| Ship | State | Description |
|---|---|---|
| Johannah | United Kingdom | The ship was driven ashore at Youghal, County Cork. She was on a voyage from Youghal to Liverpool, Lancashire. She was refloated. |

=== 29 June ===
List of shipwrecks: 29 June 1817
| Ship | State | Description |
|---|---|---|
| Flora | United Kingdom | The ship sprang a leak in the Gambia River and was beached. |
| Mary | United Kingdom | The ship struck the Travers Bank and sank. Her crew were rescued. She was on a voyage from Quebec City, Lower Canada, British North America, to the Clyde. |

=== Unknown date ===
List of shipwrecks: Unknown date in June 1817
| Ship | State | Description |
|---|---|---|
| Anfang | Danzig | The ship was wrecked on the Falsterbo Reef, in the Baltic Sea. She was on a voyage from Danzig to London, United Kingdom. |
| Christiansand | Norway | The ship was wrecked in the Old Channel before 28 June. She was on a voyage from Hamburg to Portsmouth, Hampshire, United Kingdom and Havana, Cuba. |
| Dauntless | United Kingdom | The whaler was lost off Greenland before 5 July. Her crew were rescued. |
| Dolores | Spain | The ship was captured and sunk by the insurgent privateer Congress (United States). She was on a voyage from Puerto Rico to Barcelona. |
| Drake | United Kingdom | The ship was lost off Saint-Valery-sur-Somme, Somme, France in late June. |
| Fortitude | United Kingdom | The whaler was lost off the coast of Greenland. Her crew were rescued. |
| Hodgkinson | United Kingdom | The ship was driven ashore between Neuwerk and "Dauers". She was on a voyage from Hamburg to Bristol, Gloucestershire. |
| Hoffnung | Bremen | The ship was driven ashore at "Ducdaille". she was on a voyage from Bremen to Saint Petersburg, Russia. |
| Justus Becker | Netherlands | The ship was driven ashore on Saaremaa, Russia, in mid-June. She was on a voyage from Riga, Russia, to Antwerp. |
| Lady Gambier | United Kingdom | The ship was driven ashore on the Falsterbo Reef before 21 June. She was on a voyage from Riga, Russia, to Belfast, County Antrim. She was later refloated and proceeded on her voyage. |
| Leviathan | United Kingdom | The whaler was lost off the coast of Greenland. Her crew were rescued. |
| Lion | United Kingdom | The whaler was lost off Greenland before 5 July. Her crew were rescued. |
| Margaret | Spain | The ship was wrecked near Dénia, Spain. She was on a voyage from Cádiz to Marseille, Bouches-du-Rhône, France. |
| Neptune | Flag unknown | The privateer, a brig, was run ashore in the Gulf of Mexico by the frigate Sabrina (Spanish Navy). |
| Providence | United Kingdom | The ship was driven ashore near Vlieland, Friesland, Netherlands. She was on a voyage from Hull, Yorkshire, to Amsterdam, North Holland, Netherlands. Providence was later refloated and taken in to Harlingen, Friesland, for repairs. |
| Robert & Ross | United Kingdom | The ship was scuttled off Lambay Island, County Dublin, after being used for smuggling. She was on a voyage from Liverpool, Lancashire, to Newry, County Antrim. |
| Roxana | United States | The schooner was wrecked on the Isle of Ash, Haiti. Her crew were rescued. |
| Wilhelmina | Danzig | The ship was driven ashore on Saaremaa in mid-June. She was on a voyage from Danzig to Saint Petersburg. |
| Unnamed | Kingdom of the Two Sicilies | The felucca was attacked by pirates and sunk off Piraino with the loss of at least fifteen of the 21 people on board. She was on a voyage from Melazzo, Kingdom of Sardinia to Palermo. |

== July ==
=== 1 July ===
List of shipwrecks: 1 July 1817
| Ship | State | Description |
|---|---|---|
| Dove | United Kingdom | The sloop was driven ashore and wrecked at Gunwalloe, Cornwall, with the loss of two of her four crew. |
| Lilla Gustaff | Sweden | The ship was driven ashore at Shoreham-by-Sea, Sussex, United Kingdom. She was on a voyage from Cette, Hérault, France to Gothenburg. |
| Friend's Goodwill | United Kingdom | The sloop was run into by Rachel (United Kingdom). She was consequently driven ashore at Padstow, Cornwall. |
| New Hazard | United States | The ship struck the Galloper Sand, in the North Sea, and sank. She was on a voyage from Antwerp, Netherlands to Batavia, Netherlands East Indies. |
| Providence | United Kingdom | The ship was driven ashore and severely damaged at St. Mawes, Cornwall. She was on a voyage from Great Yarmouth, Norfolk, to Dublin. |
| William | United Kingdom | The ketch was driven ashore and wrecked at Newhaven, Sussex, with the loss of two of her four crew. She was on a voyage from Ross, County Wexford, to London. |

=== 2 July ===
List of shipwrecks: 2 July 1817
| Ship | State | Description |
|---|---|---|
| Ann | United Kingdom | The ship was wrecked 6 nautical miles (11 km) south of Campbeltown, Argyllshire. Her crew were rescued. She was on a voyage from Ayr to Larne, County Antrim. |
| Juffrow Johanna Elizabeth | Netherlands | The ship was driven ashore on the "Wompel". |
| Regent | United Kingdom | The paddle steamer was destroyed by fire off Whitstable, Kent. All on board were rescued. She was on a voyage from London to Margate, Kent. |
| Thomas | United Kingdom | The ship was wrecked on Hartland Point, Devon. Her crew were rescued. She was on a voyage from Cardiff, Glamorgan, to King's Lynn, Norfolk. |

=== 3 July ===
List of shipwrecks: 3 July 1817
| Ship | State | Description |
|---|---|---|
| Ann | United Kingdom | The ship ran aground on the Neyland Rock, Margate, Kent. She was on a voyage from London to Dunkerque, Nord, France. She was refloated. |
| Bird | United Kingdom | The ship ran aground at Dover, Kent. She was on a voyage from London to Rouen, Seine-Inférieure, France. She was refloated and taken in to Dover. |
| Concord | United Kingdom | The full-rigged ship was wrecked on the Mouse Sand, in the North Sea. Her crew were rescued. |
| Kent Packet | United Kingdom | The ship was chased ashore at Lisbon, Portugal, by a Tunisian corsair. |
| Middlesex | United States | The ship was driven ashore and wrecked at Cape Fear, North Carolina. |

=== 4 July ===
List of shipwrecks: 4 July 1817
| Ship | State | Description |
|---|---|---|
| Abraham and Moses | United Kingdom | The ship ran aground on the Fairness Rock, off Margate, Kent. She was on a voyage from Boston, Lincolnshire to Havre de Grâce, Seine-Inférieure, France. She was refloated and resumed her voyage. |
| Endeavour | United Kingdom | The schooner sprang a leak and foundered off Barbados. All on board were rescued. She was on a voyage from Barbados to Surinam. |
| Friends | United Kingdom | The ship foundered in the English Channel off Dungeness, Kent. Her crew were rescued. She was on a voyage from London to Rouen, Seine-Inférieure, France. |
| St. Esprit | France | The ship was wrecked on a reef 15 leagues (45 nautical miles (83 km)) west of Martinique. She was on a voyage from Marseille, Bouches-du-Rhône, to Martinique. |

=== 5 July ===
List of shipwrecks: 5 July 1817
| Ship | State | Description |
|---|---|---|
| Atalanta | United Kingdom | The ship ran aground on the Palisadoes, off Plumb Point, Jamaica. She was on a voyage from London to Jamaica. She was refloated. |
| Irlam | United Kingdom | The ship was driven ashore at Liverpool, Lancashire. She was on a voyage from Liverpool to Barbados. |

=== 6 July ===
List of shipwrecks: 6 July 1817
| Ship | State | Description |
|---|---|---|
| Gechardina | Elbing | The ship ran aground on the Haisborough Sands, in the North Sea off the coast of Norfolk, United Kingdom. She was on a voyage from Elbing to Calais, France. She was refloated and put in to Great Yarmouth, Norfolk. |

=== 8 July ===
List of shipwrecks: 8 July 1817
| Ship | State | Description |
|---|---|---|
| Medway | United Kingdom | The ship ran aground on the Swine Bottom. She was on a voyage from Newcastle upon Tyne, Northumberland, to a Baltic port. |
| New Bradford | United Kingdom | The ship caught fire, exploded and sank in the North Sea off the Dudgeon Sandbank. Her crew were rescued. She was on a voyage from London to Hull, Yorkshire, with a cargo of gunpowder. |

=== 10 July ===
List of shipwrecks: 10 July 1817
| Ship | State | Description |
|---|---|---|
| Longdon Cheves | United States | The ship was wrecked on the Pluckington Bank, in Liverpool Bay. She was on a voyage from Savannah, Georgia, to Liverpool, Lancashire, United Kingdom. |
| Louisa | United Kingdom | The schooner was driven ashore and wrecked at Cape Bonbas, Africa. Her crew were rescued by a Spanish vessel. She was on a voyage from Gibraltar to the Cape Verde Islands, Portugal. |

=== 13 July ===
List of shipwrecks: 13 July 1817
| Ship | State | Description |
|---|---|---|
| Grande Lord | Portugal | The schooner departed from Lisbon for Faial`, Azores. She was subsequently destroyed by fire. Her crew survived. |

=== 14 July ===
List of shipwrecks: 14 July 1817
| Ship | State | Description |
|---|---|---|
| Elizabeth | United Kingdom | The ship was driven ashore at Liverpool, Lancashire. She was on a voyage from Liverpool to Antwerp, Netherlands. |

=== 15 July ===
List of shipwrecks: 15 July 1817
| Ship | State | Description |
|---|---|---|
| Dryade | United Kingdom | The ship was driven ashore in the Seine at Tancarville, Seine-Inférieure, France and was abandoned by her crew. She was later refloated. |
| Eliza | United Kingdom | The ship was driven ashore in the Seine at Tancarville and was abandoned by her crew. She was later refloated. |
| Ellen | United Kingdom | The ship foundered in Tenby Bay with the loss of all eleven people on board. |
| Hawk | United Kingdom | The ship struck the pier and sank at Dover, Kent. She was later refloated. Hawk was on a voyage from Plymouth, Devon, to London via Dover. |
| Perseverance | United Kingdom | The ship was driven ashore in the Seine at Tancarville and was abandoned by her crew. She was later refloated. |

=== 16 July ===
List of shipwrecks: 16 July 1817
| Ship | State | Description |
|---|---|---|
| Alert | United Kingdom | The ship was wrecked at Blakeney, Norfolk, with the loss of two of her crew. |
| Speculation | United Kingdom | The ship foundered in the North Sea off Reculver, Kent. Her crew were rescued. |
| Venus | United Kingdom | The brig was driven ashore in the River Exe and damaged. She was refloated and taken in to Teignmouth, Devon. |

=== 17 July ===
List of shipwrecks: 17 July 1817
| Ship | State | Description |
|---|---|---|
| Eastatingen | Norway | The ship ran aground on the West Rocks, in the North Sea off the coast of Essex, United Kingdom. She was on a voyage from North Bergen to L'Orient, Morbihan, France. She was refloated and towed in to Harwich, Essex. |

=== 21 July ===
List of shipwrecks: 25 July 1817
| Ship | State | Description |
|---|---|---|
| Mercy | United Kingdom | The ship ran aground on the Lapsand, off Helsingør, Denmark. She was on a voyage from Riga, Russia to Hull, Yorkshire. She was refloated and resumed her voyage. |

=== 25 July ===
List of shipwrecks: 25 July 1817
| Ship | State | Description |
|---|---|---|
| Elizabeth & Mary | United Kingdom | The ship was run down and sunk in the Irish Sea off Great Orme, Caernarfonshire, by Kelsick (United Kingdom). Her crew were rescued. Elizabeth & Mary was on a voyage from Liverpool, Lancashire, to Milford Haven, Pembrokeshire. |
| Trafalgar | United Kingdom | The ship was driven ashore on Briar Island, Nova Scotia, British North America. All on board were rescued. She was on a voyage from Hull, Yorkshire, to Quebec City, Lower Canada, British North America. |

=== 26 July ===
List of shipwrecks: 26 July 1817
| Ship | State | Description |
|---|---|---|
| Prince Cobourg | United Kingdom | The ship was abandoned at Maranhão, United Kingdom of Portugal, Brazil and the Algarves as unseaworthy. She was on a voyage from London to Bahia, United Kingdom of Portugal, Brazil and the Algarves. |

=== 28 July ===
List of shipwrecks: 28 July 1817
| Ship | State | Description |
|---|---|---|
| Auspicious | United Kingdom | The ship was wrecked on the Kentish Knock, in the North Sea. Her crew were rescued. She was on a voyage from Antwerp, Netherlands to Havre de Grâce, Seine-Inférieure, France. |
| Calliope | United Kingdom | The brig ran aground and was wrecked at Pernambuco, United Kingdom of Portugal, Brazil and the Algarves. Her crew were rescued. She was on a voyage from Messina, Sicily to Pernambuco. |
| St. Stanislaus | France | The ship was lost on the Bank of Tot, in the Seine. |

=== 29 July ===
List of shipwrecks: 29 July 1817
| Ship | State | Description |
|---|---|---|
| Atlas | United Kingdom | The ship departed Bengal, India, for London. No further trace, presumed foundered with the loss of all hands. |
| Friends | United Kingdom | The ship was driven ashore near Liverpool, Lancashire. She was on a voyage from Saint Kitts to Liverpool. |

=== Unknown Date ===
List of shipwrecks: Unknown date in July 1817
| Ship | State | Description |
|---|---|---|
| Alfred | France | The ship was lost near Saint-Malo, Finistère. She was on a voyage from Saint-Malo to Bordeaux, Gironde. |
| Anna Justina | Sweden | The ship was lost off the coast of Norway. She was on a voyage from Strömstad to Dublin, United Kingdom. |
| Bona Fide | Netherlands | The ship was driven ashore at Copenhagen, Denmark. She was on a voyage from Rotterdam, South Holland, to Copenhagen. |
| Britannia | United Kingdom | The brig foundered in the Strait of Belle Isle. Her crew were rescued. |
| Cognac | United Kingdom | The ship was driven ashore. She was on a voyage from Demerara to Liverpool, Lancashire. She was refloated and put in to Antigua for repairs. |
| Commerce | United Kingdom | The ship was wrecked near "Labrevatch". She was on a voyage from Cette, Hérault, France to Havre de Grâce, Seine-Inférieure, France. |
| Harriet | United States | The ship was wrecked at Beaufort, North Carolina. Her crew were rescued. She was on a voyage from New Orleans, Louisiana, to Cádiz, Spain. |
| Helen | Denmark | The ship was lost whilst on a voyage from the Faroe Islands to Trondheim, Norway. |
| Jonge Johannes | Denmark | The ship was lost near Malmö, Sweden. She was on a voyage for Randers to London, United Kingdom. |
| Pacifique | France | The ship was wrecked in the Garonne. She was on a voyage from New Orleans, Louisiana, to Bordeaux, Gironde. |
| Rebecca | United Kingdom | The schooner foundered in the Strait of Belle Isle with the loss of all but one of her crew. |
| Sally | United Kingdom | The ship was driven ashore on the Great Wrangle. She was on a voyage from Antwerp, Netherlands to Saint Petersburg, Russia. |
| Ulrica | Sweden | The ship was lost off the coast of Norway. She was on a voyage from Gothenburg to Trondheim, Norway. |

== August ==
=== 1 August ===
List of shipwrecks: 1 August 1817
| Ship | State | Description |
|---|---|---|
| Amanda | United States | The ship was wrecked at Rio Grande do Sul, Brazil, with the loss of all hands. |
| Clio | United Kingdom | The ship departed from Berbice for the Clyde. No further trace, presumed foundered with the loss of all hands. |
| Conqueror | United Kingdom | The ship was driven ashore and wrecked at Southwold, Suffolk. She was on a voyage from Newcastle upon Tyne, Northumberland, to Southwold. |
| Orra | United States | The ship was wrecked north of Rio Grande do Sul. Her crew were rescued. |

=== 2 August ===
List of shipwrecks: 2 August 1817
| Ship | State | Description |
|---|---|---|
| Aurora | Portugal | The ship departed from Rio de Janeiro, United Kingdom of Portugal, Brazil and the Algarves for Lisbon. No further trace, presumed subsequently foundered in the Atlantic Ocean with the loss of all hands. |
| Jeune Adolphe | France | The ship was wrecked on Barbuda. Her crew were rescued. She was on a voyage from Guadeloupe to Bordeaux, Gironde. |
| Linnet | United Kingdom | The sloop was lost off "The Crow". Her crew were rescued. |

=== 3 August ===
List of shipwrecks: 3 August 1817
| Ship | State | Description |
|---|---|---|
| Constant Trader | United Kingdom | The ship foundered in the Irish Sea off Holyhead, Anglesey, with the loss of all hands. |
| Elizabeth | United Kingdom | The ship struck the Mixon Sands, in the Bristol Channel and foundered. |
| Sisters | United Kingdom | The ship was wrecked in the Cayman Islands. Her crew were rescued by Unity (United Kingdom). Sisters was on a voyage from Jamaica to Lisbon, Portugal and Topsham, Devon. Unity was to be wrecked herself ten days later. |

=== 5 August ===
List of shipwrecks: 5 August 1817
| Ship | State | Description |
|---|---|---|
| Ocean | United Kingdom | The ship foundered in the North Sea off Lindesnes, Norway. Her crew were rescued by Britannia (United Kingdom). Ocean was on a voyage from Saint Petersburg, Russia, to Hull, Yorkshire. The waterlogged wreck was discovered the next day at 56°26′N 6°42′W by Blyth (United Kingdom). |

=== 6 August ===
List of shipwrecks: 6 August 1817
| Ship | State | Description |
|---|---|---|
| Horizon | United States | The full-rigged ship foundered in the Atlantic Ocean. Her crew survived. |
| Nostra Señora del Buen Successo | Spain | The ship was captured by the insurgent privateer Río de la Plata (Argentina). She was abandoned on 11 August and sank. Nostra Señora del Buen Successo was on a voyage from Havana, Cuba, to Barcelona. |
| Perth Packet | United Kingdom | The sloop sprang a leak and caught fire north of Coquet Island, Northumberland due to her cargo of quicklime getting wet. She was beached at Boulmer, where she burnt out. |

=== 7 August ===
List of shipwrecks: 7 August 1817
| Ship | State | Description |
|---|---|---|
| Venus | Flag unknown | The ship was discovered abandoned on the Spanish coast. She was on a voyage from Lisbon, Portugal to Trieste. She was taken in to Almería. |
| Vrouw Gesina | United Kingdom of the Netherlands | The ship was driven ashore at Wijk aan Zee, North Holland. She was on a voyage from Harlingen, Friesland, to London, United Kingdom. |

=== 8 August ===
List of shipwrecks: 8 August 1817
| Ship | State | Description |
|---|---|---|
| Amelia | United Kingdom | The ship was run into by the full-rigged ship Lancaster (United Kingdom) and was severely damaged. Amelia was on a voyage from Liverpool, Lancashire to New York, United States. She put in to Falmouth, Cornwall. |
| Dartmouth | United Kingdom | The ship was driven ashore in St. Bride's Bay. She was on a voyage from Pictou, Nova Scotia, British North America, to Bristol. Gloucestershire. |
| Nancy | United Kingdom | The ship ran aground. She was on a voyage from Liverpool to Leer, Kingdom of Hanover. She was refloated and put in to Cuxhaven in a leaky condition. She was placed under repair. |

=== 9 August ===
List of shipwrecks: 9 August 1817
| Ship | State | Description |
|---|---|---|
| Queen Charlotte | United Kingdom | The ship was driven ashore in Abercastle Bay, Pembrokeshire. She was on a voyage from Dublin to Cork. She was refloated and taken in to Fishguard, Pembrokeshire. |

=== 10 August ===
List of shipwrecks: 10 August 1817
| Ship | State | Description |
|---|---|---|
| James | United Kingdom | The ship was run down and sunk in the Gulf of Finland. Her crew were rescued. She was on a voyage from Saint Petersburg, Russia, to Sunderland, County Durham. |
| Tottenham | United Kingdom | The ship was driven ashore in the River Thames at Erith, Kent. She was on a voyage from London to New South Wales. She was refloated. |

=== 12 August ===
List of shipwrecks: 12 August 1817
| Ship | State | Description |
|---|---|---|
| Huddlestone | United Kingdom | The sloop struck rocks at Aberdeen. She was taken in to the harbour there but consequently sank. She was on a voyage from Sunderland, County Durham, to Aberdeen. |
| William and Mary | United Kingdom | The ship was wrecked on the Lougharne Sands with the loss of two lives. She was on a voyage from Llanelli, Glamorgan, to Carmarthen. |

=== 13 August ===
List of shipwrecks: 13 August 1817
| Ship | State | Description |
|---|---|---|
| Prince Regent | United Kingdom | The ship was on her way from Havana to Amsterdam when she ran aground on the flats near Eyerland. After 216 boxes of sugar had been offloaded she was refloated and came into the Texel. |
| Trusty | United Kingdom | The ship sank at Great Yarmouth, Norfolk. |
| Unity | United Kingdom | The ship was wrecked on the Carysfort Reef. All on board were rescued by John (United Kingdom). Unity was on a voyage from Jamaica to London. |
| Vijf Sostre | Netherlands | The ship was driven ashore and wrecked at Rye, Sussex, United Kingdom. Her crew were rescued. She was on a voyage from Benicarló, Spain to Amsterdam, North Holland. |

=== 14 August ===
List of shipwrecks: 14 August 1817
| Ship | State | Description |
|---|---|---|
| Welton | United Kingdom | The ship capsized and sank in the Hooghly River. Her crew were rescued but all cargo, mails, and personal belongings were lost. She was on a voyage from Bengal, India, to London. |

=== 15 August ===
List of shipwrecks: 15 August 1817
| Ship | State | Description |
|---|---|---|
| Ariadne | United Kingdom | The ship was wrecked on the Sandhammer Reef, in the Baltic Sea. Her crew were rescued. She was on a voyage from Memel, Prussia to Alloa, Clackmannanshire. |
| Neptune | United Kingdom | The ship foundered in the North Sea off Ameland, Friesland, Netherlands. She was on a voyage from London to Bremen. |
| Sir Home Popham | United Kingdom | The ship was wrecked off St. Alban's Head, Dorset. She was on a voyage from Lisbon Portugal to Antwerp, Netherlands. |

=== 17 August ===
List of shipwrecks: 17 August 1817
| Ship | State | Description |
|---|---|---|
| Temstry | United Kingdom | The ship sank at Great Yarmouth, Norfolk. |

=== 18 August ===
List of shipwrecks: 18 August 1817
| Ship | State | Description |
|---|---|---|
| Broederen | Hamburg | The ship was lost off Texel, North Holland, Netherlands with the loss of all but two of her crew. She was on a voyage from Lisbon, Portugal, to Hamburg. |
| Guardian | United Kingdom | The ship was wrecked on the Newcombe Sand, in the North Sea off Lowestoft, Suffolk. Her crew were rescued. She was on a voyage from South Shields, County Durham, to London. |
| Unity | United Kingdom | The ship was wrecked on the Carysfort Reef. All on board (her crew and that of the Sisters) were rescued by John (United Kingdom). Unity was on a voyage from Jamaica to London. |

=== 19 August ===
List of shipwrecks: 19 August 1817
| Ship | State | Description |
|---|---|---|
| Huddlestone | United Kingdom | The ship was driven ashore and wrecked at Aberdeen. She was on a voyage from Sunderland, County Durham, to Aberdeen. |

=== 21 August ===
List of shipwrecks: 21 August 1817
| Ship | State | Description |
|---|---|---|
| Jane Coutts | United Kingdom | The ship capsized off Bermuda with the loss of all but one of those on board. The survivor was rescued on 27 August by Frederick (Hamburg). Jane Coutts was on a voyage from London to Charleston, South Carolina, United States. |

=== 22 August ===
List of shipwrecks: 22 August 1817
| Ship | State | Description |
|---|---|---|
| Eggo | Russia | The ship was driven ashore on Ameland, Friesland, Netherlands. She was on a voyage from Liebau, Courland Governorater to Antwerp, Netherlands. |
| Frederick Herman | Netherlands | The ship was driven ashore on Ameland. She was on a voyage from Königsberg, Prussia to the Maas. |
| Goede Hoop | Netherlands | The ship was driven ashore on Ameland. She was on a voyage from Riga, Russia, to Schiedam, South Holland. |
| Jane Coutts | United Kingdom | The ship was capsized off Bermuda with the loss of all but one of those on board, over 22 lives. She was on a voyage from London to Charleston, South Carolina, United States. |
| Jong Wilhelm | Netherlands | The ship was driven ashore on Ameland. She was on a voyage from Memel, Prussia to Rotterdam, South Holland. |
| Salvator | Netherlands | The ship was lost in the North Sea off the Noordvarder Sandbank. Her crew survived. She was on a voyage from Christiania, Norway, to Bruges. |

=== 23 August ===
List of shipwrecks: 23 August 1817
| Ship | State | Description |
|---|---|---|
| Carl and Andreas | Prussia | The ship was driven ashore and wrecked at Vlissingen, Zeeland, Netherlands. |
| Industry | United Kingdom | The ship foundered in the Bristol Channel off Minehead, Somerset, with the loss of all five of her crew. She was on a voyage from a Welsh port to Dungarvan, County Down. |

=== 24 August ===
List of shipwrecks: 24 August 1817
| Ship | State | Description |
|---|---|---|
| Lord Nelson | United Kingdom | The ship was wrecked near Shelburne, Nova Scotia, British North America. More than 280 people were rescued. |
| New Prosperous, and William | United Kingdom | The brig was run into by the brig William at Brighton, Sussex. Both vessels were subsequently driven ashore and wrecked. |
| Œlus | United States | The full-rigged ship was wrecked in Ensinada Bay. She was on a voyage from Montevideo, Brazil to Buenos Aires, Argentina. |

=== 25 August ===
List of shipwrecks: 25 August 1817
| Ship | State | Description |
|---|---|---|
| Captain Cook | United Kingdom | The ship was driven ashore at Orford, Suffollk. She was refloated. |
| Jenny | United Kingdom | The ship sprang a leak and foundered in the Irish Sea off Saturness, Dumfriesshire, with the loss of two lives. She was on a voyage from Whitehaven, Cumberland, to Dumfries. |
| St. Nicolay | Russia | The ship ran aground. She was on a voyage from Saint Petersburg to Dunkerque, Nord, France. She was refloated and taken in to Dunkerque in a severely leaky condition. |

=== 26 August ===
List of shipwrecks: 26 August 1817
| Ship | State | Description |
|---|---|---|
| Mercury | United Kingdom | The ship was run into by William at Greenock, Renfrewshire. Mercury subsequently came ashore. She was on a voyage from the Clyde to St. Domingo. |
| William | United Kingdom | The ship ran into Mercury at Greenock. William subsequently came ashore. William was on a voyage from the Clyde to Jamaica. |
| Unnamed | Flag unknown | The ship was wrecked off Worthing, Sussex, United Kingdom. |

=== 27 August ===
List of shipwrecks: 27 August 1817
| Ship | State | Description |
|---|---|---|
| George | United Kingdom | The ship was wrecked at Greenore Point, County Louth. She was on a voyage from Wexford to Milford Haven, Pembrokeshire. |
| Hibernia | United Kingdom | The ship departed from Plymouth, Devon, for Liverpool, Lancashire. She was last sighted off Land's End, Cornwall. Presumed subsequently foundered with the loss of all hands. |

=== 29 August ===
List of shipwrecks: 29 August 1817
| Ship | State | Description |
|---|---|---|
| Johannah Christina | Netherlands | The ship was driven ashore and wrecked at Newhaven, Sussex, United Kingdom. She was on a voyage from Cette, Hérault, France to Rotterdam, South Holland. |
| Margritta | Bremen | The ship was lost near Terschelling, Friesland, Netherlands. She was on a voyage from Liverpool, Lancashire, United Kingdom, to Bremen. |
| Mary | United Kingdom | The ship was driven ashore in the Abrolhos Archipelago, Brazil. She was on a voyage from London to the Cape of Good Hope. |

=== 30 August ===
List of shipwrecks: 30 August 1817
| Ship | State | Description |
|---|---|---|
| Euphemia | United Kingdom | The ship was driven ashore and wrecked on "Lavnscar". Her crew were rescued. She was on a voyage from Saint Petersburg, Russia, to Tenerife, Canary Islands. |
| Nadescha | Netherlands | The ship was driven ashore on Schouwen, Zeeland. |

=== 31 August ===
List of shipwrecks: 31 August 1817
| Ship | State | Description |
|---|---|---|
| Argus | Netherlands | The ship ran aground on the Goodwin Sands, Kent, United Kingdom. She was on a voyage from Antwerp to Marseille, Bouches-du-Rhône, France. She was refloated with assistance and taken in to Ramsgate, Kent. |
| Pluto | United Kingdom | The ship was driven ashore and wrecked on the Foreness Rock, off Margate, Kent. She was on a voyage from Portsmouth, Hampshire, to London. |

=== Unknown date ===
List of shipwrecks: Unknown date in August 1817
| Ship | State | Description |
|---|---|---|
| Blucher | Malta | The ship foundered in the Mediterranean Sea off Cyprus. |
| Drake | United Kingdom | The ship was wrecked in the Firth of Forth. She was on a voyage from Rotterdam, South Holland, Netherlands to Leith, Lothian. |
| General Palafox | United Kingdom | The ship sprang a leak and was beached at "Point Towre", where she was wrecked. |
| Hawkesbury Packet | (United Kingdom of Great Britain and Ireland) New South Wales | The sloop ran aground at Minnamurra and was wrecked. |
| Hercules | United Kingdom | The ship was driven ashore at Quillebeuf-sur-Seine, Eure, France. |
| Isla | United Kingdom | The ship ran aground at Neath, Glamorgan and was damaged. She was on a voyage from Neath to Teignmouth, Devon. She was refloated and completed her voyage. |
| Jeune Sophie | United Kingdom | The ship was destroyed by fire in the Atlantic Ocean before 31 August. Her crew survived. She was on a voyage from Havre de Grâce, Seine-Inférieure to Mauritius. |
| Jonge Hendrick | Netherlands | The ship was driven ashore and wrecked near Memel, Prussia. She was on a voyage from Elbing to Amsterdam, North Holland. |
| Lord Yarborough | United Kingdom | The ship was driven ashore in the Orkney Islands. |
| Merrimack | United States | The brig was wrecked in the Florida Keys. Her crew survived. She was on a voyage from Havana, Cuba, to New York. |
| Mohawk | United States | The ship was wrecked on Crooked Island, Bahamas. Her crew were rescued. She was on a voyage from New York to Port-au-Prince, Haiti. |
| Monmouth | United States | The brig foundered before 21 August whilst on a voyage from Boston, Massachusetts, to Barbados. Her crew survived. |
| Seven Friends | United Kingdom | The ship sprang a leak in the Atlantic Ocean and was abandoned by her crew. She was on a voyage from Belfast, County Down, to Boston, Massachusetts, United States. |
| Wilton | United Kingdom | The ship was wrecked in the Hooghly River. |

== September ==
=== 2 September ===
List of shipwrecks: 2 September 1817
| Ship | State | Description |
|---|---|---|
| Nossa Senhora de Conceicao & Oliviera | Portugal | The ship foundered in the Atlantic Ocean off Pará, Brazil. Her crew were rescued. She was on a voyage from Pará to Lisbon. |
| Phœnix | United Kingdom | The ship was wrecked at "Mascal", India. She was on a voyage from Bengal to Madras. |

=== 3 September ===
List of shipwrecks: 3 September 1817
| Ship | State | Description |
|---|---|---|
| Alicia | United Kingdom | The ship was driven ashore at Martha's Vineyard, Massachusetts, United States. Her crew were rescued. She was on a voyage from Tobago to Saint John, New Brunswick, British North America. |
| Jenny | United Kingdom | The ship caught fire in the River Thames and was scuttled. She was on a voyage from London to Hamburg. |
| Malta | United Kingdom | The ship ran aground in the River Thames at Cuckold's Point, Surrey, and was wrecked. She was on a voyage from London to Grenada. |

=== 4 September ===
List of shipwrecks: 4 September 1817
| Ship | State | Description |
|---|---|---|
| Factor | United States | The ship ran aground and capsized at Havre de Grâce, Seine-Inférieure, France. She was on a voyage from New York to Havre de Grâce. Factor was later refloated and taken in to Havre de Grâce. |

=== 6 September ===
List of shipwrecks: 6 September 1817
| Ship | State | Description |
|---|---|---|
| Harlequin | United Kingdom | The ship was destroyed by fire in the Demerara River. |
| Vrouw Gesina | Flag unknown | The ship was driven ashore at Quillebeuf-sur-Seine, Eure, France. |

=== 8 September ===
List of shipwrecks: 8 September 1817
| Ship | State | Description |
|---|---|---|
| Johannes and Francisca | Prussia | The ship was driven ashore and wrecked at A Coruña, Spain. Her crew survived. She was on a voyage from Memel to Oporto, Portugal |

=== 11 September ===
List of shipwrecks: 11 September 1817
| Ship | State | Description |
|---|---|---|
| Maria | (United Kingdom of Great Britain and Ireland) Cape Colony | The coaster was wrecked on Robben Island. |
| Winifred and Maria | (United Kingdom of Great Britain and Ireland) Cape Colony | The coaster was wrecked at the Cape of Good Hope. |

=== 13 September ===
List of shipwrecks: 13 September 1817
| Ship | State | Description |
|---|---|---|
| Industry | United Kingdom | The ship foundered in the Bristol Channel off Minehead, Somerset with the loss of all five crew. She was on a voyage from a Welsh port to Dungarvan, County Antrim. |
| Lautaro | United Kingdom | The ship foundered in the Atlantic Ocean with the loss of 27 of the 47 people on board. Survivors were rescued by Jessy (United Kingdom). Lautaro was on a voyage from the Clyde to Charleston, South Carolina, United States. |
| Sir James Henry Craig | United Kingdom | The ship put back to Calcutta after sailing for London. She had endured 14 days of gales that had left her leaking and with her mainmast and bowsprit sprung. She was condemned on 14 November. |

=== 14 September ===
List of shipwrecks: 14 September 1817
| Ship | State | Description |
|---|---|---|
| Rosetta | Netherlands | The ship was driven ashore and wrecked in the Scheldt. She was on a voyage from Riga, Russia, to Antwerp |

=== 16 September ===
List of shipwrecks: 16 September 1817
| Ship | State | Description |
|---|---|---|
| Hercules | United Kingdom | The ship foundered in the Atlantic Ocean 150 nautical miles (280 km) north east of Cape Clear Island, British North America. Her crew were rescued by Two Brothers (United Kingdom). She was on a voyage from Liverpool, Lancashire, to Miramichi Bay. |
| Warre | United Kingdom | The ship departed from Saint Petersburg, Russia, for London. Presumed subsequently foundered off Memel, Prussia with the loss of all hands. |

=== 17 September ===
List of shipwrecks: 17 September 1817
| Ship | State | Description |
|---|---|---|
| Jane | United Kingdom | The ship was driven ashore and wrecked 15 nautical miles (28 km) from Montevideo, United Provinces of the Río de la Plata. The wreck was plundered by the local inhabitants. |
| Lark | United Kingdom | The ship was wrecked on the Nuevitas Reef, in the Atlantic Ocean off the north coast of Cuba. Her crew were rescued. She was on a voyage from Saint Petersburg, Russia, to Havana, Cuba. |
| Mary | United Kingdom | The ship ran aground in the Elbe. She was on a voyage from Hull, Yorkshire to Hamburg. She was refloated and completed her voyage in a leaky condition. |
| Vine | United Kingdom | The ship was driven ashore at St. Esprit, Nova Scotia, British North America. Her crew were rescued. She was on a voyage from Belfast, County Antrim, to Quebec City, Lower Canada, British North America. |
| Union | United Kingdom | The ship ran aground in the Gut of Canso. She was later refloated and taken in to port. |

=== 18 September ===
List of shipwrecks: 18 September 1817
| Ship | State | Description |
|---|---|---|
| Harriet | United Kingdom | The ship ran aground on the south coast of Saltholm, Denmark. She was on a voyage from London to Stettin. Harriet was later refloated and put into Copenhagen, Denmark, for repairs. |

=== 19 September ===
List of shipwrecks: 19 September 1817
| Ship | State | Description |
|---|---|---|
| Dotterel | United Kingdom | The brig foundered in the Indian Ocean of off Coringa, India. |
| Hope | United Kingdom | The brig was driven ashore and wrecked at "Upparah", India (25 nautical miles (46 km) north of Coringa. |

=== 22 September ===
List of shipwrecks: 22 September 1817
| Ship | State | Description |
|---|---|---|
| Ulrika | Flag unknown | The ship was lost off Skagen, Denmark. She was on a voyage from "Blomberg" to Newry, County Antrim, United Kingdom. |

=== 24 September ===
List of shipwrecks: 24 September 1817
| Ship | State | Description |
|---|---|---|
| Charlotte | United Kingdom | The ship foundered whilst on a voyage from London to Faro, Portugal. Her crew were rescued by Swallow (United Kingdom). |
| Cora | United States | The full-rigged ship was driven ashore and wrecked at New Orleans, Louisiana. She was on a voyage from New Orleans to Bordeaux, Gironde, France. She was later refloated and taken in to New Orleans. |
| Fairnie | United Kingdom | The ship foundered in the Atlantic Ocean off Killybegs, County Donegal. Her crew were rescued. She was on a voyage from Belfast, County Antrim, to Donegal. |
| Gustavus | United States | The brig was driven ashore at New Orleans. She was on a voyage from New Orleans to Bordeaux. |
| Little Dudley | United Kingdom | The ship foundered in the Atlantic Ocean. Her crew were rescued by William & Henry (United Kingdom). Little Dudley was on a voyage from Ross-on-Wye, Herefordshire, to Newfoundland, British North America. |
| Suffolk | United Kingdom | The full-rigged ship was driven ashore 9 nautical miles (17 km) south of New Orleans. She was on a voyage from New Orleans to Liverpool, Lancashire. |

=== 25 September ===
List of shipwrecks: 25 September 1817
| Ship | State | Description |
|---|---|---|
| Ann | United Kingdom | The ship ws wrecked on São Miguel Island, Azores. All on board were rescued. She was on a voyage from Dublin to Quebec City, British North America. |

=== 26 September ===
List of shipwrecks: 26 September 1817
| Ship | State | Description |
|---|---|---|
| Attina | Prussia | The ship was driven ashore near Ørum, Denmark. She was on a voyage from Königsberg to Amsterdam, North Holland, Netherlands |
| Bergetta | Norway | The brig was wrecked on the Cefn-Sidan Sands, in Carmarthen Bay. Her crew were rescued. She was on a voyage from Barcelona, Spain, to Stettin, Prussia. Local inhabitants plundered her cargo of wine. |
| Duchess of York | United Kingdom | The ship ran aground in the River Thames at Gravesend, Kent. she was on a voyage from Buenos Aires, Argentina, to London. Duchess of York was refloated on 8 October and resumed her voyage. |
| Fiden | United Kingdom | The ship ran aground on the Black Middens, in the North Sea off the coast of County Durham. She was later refloated. |
| Glenthorne | United Kingdom | The ship was driven ashore in the Sound of Achille, County Mayo. She was on a voyage from New York, United States to Liverpool, Lancashire. She was later refloated. |
| Young Lucas | United Kingdom | The ship was driven ashore and wrecked at Shoreham-by-Sea, Sussex. She was on a voyage from Calais to Bordeaux, Gironde, France. |

=== 27 September ===
List of shipwrecks: 27 September 1817
| Ship | State | Description |
|---|---|---|
| Brucks | Netherlands | The ship was driven ashore on Texel, North Holland. She was on a voyage from Amsterdam, North Holland to Marseille, Bouches-du-Rhône, France. She was later refloated. |
| Fraw Catharina | Hamburg | The ship was driven ashore and wrecked in the "Hever". She was on a voyage from Antwerp, Netherlands to Hamburg. |
| Jane | United Kingdom | The ship was driven ashore on Sylt, Duchy of Schleswig. She was on a voyage from Hull, Yorkshire, to Hamburg |
| Marys | United Kingdom | The ship was driven ashore at Black Rock, Lancashire. She was on a voyage from Campeche, Mexico to Liverpool, Lancashire. She was refloated and completed her voyage. |

=== 28 September ===
List of shipwrecks: 28 September 1817
| Ship | State | Description |
|---|---|---|
| Duchess of York | United Kingdom | The ship was driven ashore in the River Thames at Gravesend, Kent. She was on a voyage from Buenos Aires, Argentina to London. |
| Gustava Henrietta | Prussia | The ship was lost near Memel. |
| Salus | United Kingdom | The ship was destroyed by fire at Quebec City, Lower Canada, British North America. |
| William | United Kingdom | The ship was driven ashore and wrecked on Texel, North Holland, Netherlands with the loss of two of her five crew. She was on a voyage from Liverpool, Lancashire, to Leer, Kingdom of Hanover. |

=== 29 September ===
List of shipwrecks: 29 September 1817
| Ship | State | Description |
|---|---|---|
| George | United Kingdom | The ship was driven ashore and wrecked on Götaland, Sweden or Hogland, Russia. Her crew were rescued. She was on a voyage from Dundee, Forfarshire, to Saint Petersburg, Russia. |
| Hunter | United Kingdom | The ship ran aground at Pillau, Prussia. She was on a voyage from Newcastle upon Tyne, Northumberland to Pillau. She was refloated. |
| Unnamed | Prussia | The ship was lost between Nidden and "Schwartzorth" with the loss of all hands. |

=== 30 September ===
List of shipwrecks: 30 September 1817
| Ship | State | Description |
|---|---|---|
| Harmonie | Hamburg | The ship was driven ashore and damaged at Stade, Kingdom of Hanover. She was on a voyage from London, United Kingdom to Hamburg. She was refloated on 2 October and arrived at Hamburg that day. |
| Joseph and Samuel | United Kingdom | The brig was lost on the Tegeler's Plaat, off the mouth of the Weser with the loss of all hands. |

=== Unknown date ===
List of shipwrecks: Unknown date in September 1817
| Ship | State | Description |
|---|---|---|
| Apollo | United Kingdom | The brig foundered in the Baltic Sea off Memel, Prussia with the loss of all hands. |
| Bombay | India | The ship was lost during September. |
| Constance | France | The ship sprang a leak in the Seine and was beached. She was on a voyage from Havre de Grâce to Rouen, Seine-Inférieure. |
| Corneli | Flag unknown | The ship was wrecked on the Hogsty Reef, Bahamas. Her crew were rescued. |
| Dudley | United Kingdom | The schooner foundered in the Atlantic Ocean. Her crew were rescued by Unity (United Kingdom). She was on a voyage from Ross-on-Wye, Herefordshire, to Newfoundland, British North America. |
| Fairy | United Kingdom | The ship was wrecked in the Orkney Islands. She was on a voyage from an American port to Dundee, Forfarshire. |
| Frederickstein | United States | The ship was wrecked about 2 leagues (6 nautical miles (11 km)) south of Colonia, New Jersey. |
| George | United Kingdom | The ship was wrecked at Brim Ness, Orkney Islands. She was on a voyage from Miramichi, New Brunswick, British North America to Blyth, Northumberland. |
| Johanna | Elbing | The ship was run down and sunk in the Baltic Sea off Møn, Denmark before 25 September by Joseph and Mary (United Kingdom). Her crew were rescued by Joseph and Mary. Johanna was on a voyage from Elbing to London, United Kingdom. |
| Jong Willem | Kingdom of Hanover | The ship was lost whilst on a voyage from Newcastle upon Tyne, Northumberland, to Emden. |
| Levant | United Kingdom | The ship was driven ashore at Willoughby Point, Virginia, United States, in early September. She was on a voyage from London to Virginia. Levant was later refloated and taken in to Norfolk, Virginia. |
| Maria | France | The ship was lost near "Helsandt". She was on a voyage from Antwerp, Netherlands to Bordeaux, Gironde. |
| Maria | United Kingdom | The ship was sunk on the Arklow Banks, in the Irish Sea. Her crew were rescued by Perseverance (United Kingdom). She was on a voyage from Chester, Cheshire, to Pictou, Nova Scotia, British North America. |
| Nicolay | Russia | The ship was lost in the "Berke Islands". She was on a voyage from Saint Petersburg to Riga. |
| Recompense | United States | The brig sprang a leak and was abandoned in the Atlantic Ocean before 20 September. |
| Samuel Braddock | United Kingdom | The ship foundered in the Atlantic Ocean before 12 September. Her crew were rescued by Amy (United Kingdom). Samuel Braddock was on a voyage from Liverpool, Lancashire, to Quebec City, Lower Canada, British North America. |
| Topéz | Flag unknown | The schooner was abandoned in the Atlantic Ocean before 30 September. |
| Vier Gebroeders | Kingdom of Hanover | The ship was lost whilst on a voyage from Newcastle upon Tyne to Emden. |
| Weser | Bremen | The ship ran aground at Arkhangelsk, Russia in late September. She ws on a voyage from Arkhangelsk to Bremen. She was refloated and put back to Arkhangelsk. |
| 3 Bruder | Netherlands | The ship was driven ashore at Vlissingen, Zeeland. She was on a voyage from Saint Petersburg to Antwerp. |

== October ==
=== 1 October ===
List of shipwrecks: 1 October 1817
| Ship | State | Description |
|---|---|---|
| HMS Julia | Royal Navy | The 16-gun ship was wrecked at Tristan da Cunha with the loss of 45 lives. There were 20 or 24 survivors. |
| Neptune | United Kingdom | The ship was driven ashore at Lambert's Point, Virginia, United States. |
| Watson | United States | The ship was abandoned in the Atlantic Ocean and subsequently foundered, although she was still afloat on 3 October. She was on a voyage from Havre de Grâce, Seine-Inférieure, France to Philadelphia, Pennsylvania. |

=== 2 October ===
List of shipwrecks: 2 October 1817
| Ship | State | Description |
|---|---|---|
| Cato | United Kingdom | The ship was lost near Memel, Prussia. Her crew were rescued. |
| Dorothea | United Kingdom | The ship was lost near Memel. Her crew were rescued. |
| Isis | United Kingdom | The ship was lost near Memel. Her crew were rescued. |
| Rachel | United Kingdom | The ship was lost near Memel. Her crew were rescued. |
| Vezul (Везул) | Imperial Russian Navy | The frigate was driven ashore and wrecked on the western cape of uk:Kozacha Bay at Sevastopol, with the loss of two lives. She was on a voyage from Sevastopol to Sukhumi. |

=== 3 October ===
List of shipwrecks: 3 October 1817
| Ship | State | Description |
|---|---|---|
| Flora | United Kingdom | The ship departed from Arkhangelsk, Russia, for Hull, Yorkshire. No further trace, presumed foundered with the loss of all hands. |
| John & Jane | United Kingdom | The ship was lost off Terschelling, Friesland, Netherlands with the loss of all but two of her crew. She was on a voyage from Sunderland, County Durham, to Amsterdam, North Holland, Netherlands. |
| Vrouw Anna Rebecca | Netherlands | The galiot was lost near Terschelling, Friesland. |

=== 4 October ===
List of shipwrecks: 4 October 1817
| Ship | State | Description |
|---|---|---|
| Phœbe | United Kingdom | The ship was driven ashore at Great Yarmouth, Norfolk. She was on a voyage from Amsterdam, North Holland, Netherlands to Hull, Yorkshire. Phœbe was later refloated and taken in to Great Yarmouth. |
| Pilot | United Kingdom | The brig departed from Quebec City, Lower Canada, British North America, for Aberdeen. No further trace, presumed foundered in the Atlantic Ocean off Cape Wrath, Sutherland, where part of her cargo came ashore. |

=== 5 October ===
List of shipwrecks: 5 October 1817
| Ship | State | Description |
|---|---|---|
| Emma | United States | The ship was wrecked on reefs off Bermuda. She was on a voyage from New York to St. Vincent, Virgin Islands. |
| Sarah | United States | The brig capsized in a hurricane off St. Croix, Virgin Islands. Seven crew were rescued on 19 October by Thorntons (United Kingdom). Sarah was on a voyage from Bath, Maine, to St. Croix. |
| Urania | Hamburg | The ship was driven ashore on Cross Island and was abandoned by her crew. She was on a voyage from Arkhangelsk, Russia, to Amsterdam, North Holland, Netherlands. |

=== 6 October ===
List of shipwrecks: 6 October 1817
| Ship | State | Description |
|---|---|---|
| Frau Catharina | Netherlands | The ship was driven ashore and wrecked on Ösel, Denmark. Her crew were rescued. She was on a voyage from Saint Petersburg, Russia, to Antwerp. |
| Juno | United Kingdom | The ship was driven ashore and wrecked on Ösel. Her crew were rescued. She was on a voyage from Liverpool, Lancashire, to Saint Petersburg. |

=== 7 October ===
List of shipwrecks: 7 October 1817
| Ship | State | Description |
|---|---|---|
| Dispatch | United Kingdom | The ship sank at Rio de Janeiro, United Kingdom of Portugal, Brazil and the Algarves. |
| St. Nicolay | Russia | The ship was driven ashore at Arkhangelsk. |

=== 9 October ===
List of shipwrecks: 9 October 1817
| Ship | State | Description |
|---|---|---|
| Vigilantia | Norway | The ship ran aground and was damaged on the Goodwin Sands, Kent, United Kingdom. She was on a voyage from Dram to Waterford, United Kingdom. Vigilantia was refloated the next day and taken in to Ramsgate, Kent. |
| Wheatsheaf | United Kingdom | The ship was wrecked near South Shields, County Durham. Her crew were rescued by the Shields Lifeboat. She was on a voyage from South Shields to Faversham, Kent. |

=== 10 October ===
List of shipwrecks: 10 October 1817
| Ship | State | Description |
|---|---|---|
| James | United Kingdom | The sloop was in collision with London Packet (United Kingdom) and foundered in the Irish Sea off Great Orme Head, Caernarvonshire. Her crew were rescued. She was on a voyage from Liverpool, Lancashire, to Rosà, Kingdom of Lombardy–Venetia |
| Maria | United Kingdom | The ship was wrecked on Prince Edward Island, British North America. She was on a voyage from Liverpool to Quebec City, Lower Canada, British North America. |

=== 11 October ===
List of shipwrecks: 11 October 1817
| Ship | State | Description |
|---|---|---|
| Christians Mundi | Norway | The ship foundered off Cape Wrath, Caithness, United Kingdom. Her crew were rescued. She was on a voyage from Dram to Belfast, County Antrim, United Kingdom. |
| William | United Kingdom | The ship was run down and sunk in the English Channel off Eastbourne, Sussex, by Nautilus (United Kingdom). Her crew were rescued. She was on a voyage from Poole, Dorset, to London. |
| Vrow Finck Engelina | Danzig | The ship was driven ashore and wrecked 3 nautical miles (5.6 km) east of Calais, France. She was on a voyage from Danzig to Bordeaux, Gironde, France. |

=== 12 October ===
List of shipwrecks: 12 October 1817
| Ship | State | Description |
|---|---|---|
| Balthazar | Netherlands | The ship was wrecked at Valencia, Spain. She was on a voyage from Ostend to Barcelona, Spain. |
| Enigkeit | Norway | The ship was lost on the Vogelsand, in the North Sea off the mouth of the Elbe. Her crew were rescued. |
| William & Ellen | United Kingdom | The ship was driven ashore at Chapel Tunnel, Lincolnshire. She was on a voyage from Hull, Yorkshire, to Wisbech, Cambridgeshire. |

=== 13 October ===
List of shipwrecks: 13 October 1817
| Ship | State | Description |
|---|---|---|
| Friends | (United Kingdom of Great Britain and Ireland) Guernsey | The ship was driven ashore and wrecked at Alicante, Spain. |
| Jean Etienne | France | The ship was abandoned in the Atlantic Ocean (18°47′N 9°11′W). Her crew were rescued by Guth Christine (Flag unknown). Jean Etienne was on a voyage from Nantes, Loire-Inférieure to La Rochelle, Charente-Maritime. |
| Prince Regent | United Kingdom | The ship foundered in the North Sea north of Scheveningen, North Holland, Netherlands, with the loss of all but one of her crew. She was on a voyage from Bristol, Gloucestershire, to Amsterdam, North Holland. |
| Rowena | United Kingdom | The ship was driven ashore near Stromness, Orkney Islands. She was on a voyage from Pictou, Nova Scotia, British North America, to Aberdeen. |
| Strathmore | United Kingdom | The ship foundered in the Baltic Sea off Rügen. Her crew were rescued. She was on a voyage from Danzig to Dundee, Forfarshire. |
| Several unnamed vessels | Spain | The barques were driven ashore at Alicante. |

=== 14 October ===
List of shipwrecks: 14 October 1817
| Ship | State | Description |
|---|---|---|
| Rover | United Kingdom | The ship sprang a leak and was abandoned in the Atlantic Ocean 300 nautical miles (560 km) west of Ireland. Her crew survived. She was on a voyage from St. Andrews, New Brunswick, British North America, to Stockton-on-Tees, Yorkshire. |

=== 15 October ===
List of shipwrecks: 15 October 1817
| Ship | State | Description |
|---|---|---|
| Annabella | United Kingdom | The sloop departed from Rotterdam, South Holland, Netherlands, for Dover, Kent. Presumed subsequently foundered in the North Sea with the loss of all hands. |

=== 16 October ===
List of shipwrecks: 16 October 1817
| Ship | State | Description |
|---|---|---|
| Caperfey | United Kingdom | The ship was wrecked near Cimbritsham, Sweden. Her crew were rescued. She was on a voyage from Memel, Prussia to London. |
| Good Intent | United Kingdom | The ship struck a rock off St. Mawes, Cornwall. She was on a voyage from Bremen to Cádiz, Spain. She put in to Falmouth, Cornwall. |
| Hannah | United Kingdom | The ship was wrecked on the Haisborough Sands, in the North Sea off the coast of Norfolk. Her crew were rescued. |
| Unnamed | United Kingdom | The Humber Keel foundered in the North Sea north of Mundesley, Norfolk. |

=== 17 October ===
List of shipwrecks: 17 October 1817
| Ship | State | Description |
|---|---|---|
| Harriet | United Kingdom | The ship was abandoned in the Atlantic Ocean. She was on a voyage from Kirkcaldy, Fife, to Charleston, South Carolina. |
| Jane & Eliza | United Kingdom | The ship was driven ashore in the Bay of Isigny. She was on a voyage from Bristol, Gloucestershire, to Rouen, Seine-Inférieure. She was refloated in November. |
| New Providence | (United Kingdom of Great Britain and Ireland) British North America | The ship was wrecked on the south coast of Antigua. |
| Rebecca | United Kingdom | The ship struck a rock in the Norwegian Sea (63°30′N 3°30′E and was consequently beached on "Furow Island" the next day. She was on a voyage from Arkhangelsk, Russia, to London. |
| Unnamed | Flag unknown | The ship, a cutter or a sloop, was wrecked on the Goodwin Sands, Kent, United Kingdom. |

=== 18 October ===
List of shipwrecks: 18 October 1817
| Ship | State | Description |
|---|---|---|
| Diamond | United Kingdom | The ship was driven ashore at Weymouth, Dorset. She was on a voyage from Waterford to Portsmouth, Hampshire. |
| West Indian | United Kingdom | The ship was driven ashore on the coast of the Grand Duchy of Finland. She was on a voyage from Saint Petersburg, Russia to London. She was refloated and taken in to Reval, Russia. |

=== 19 October ===
List of shipwrecks: 19 October 1817
| Ship | State | Description |
|---|---|---|
| Christina | United Kingdom | The brig foundered in the Strait of Malacca with the loss of all on board, over 30 people. |

=== 20 October ===
List of shipwrecks: 20 October 1817
| Ship | State | Description |
|---|---|---|
| Rebecca | United States | The ship was wrecked in a hurricane at Barbados. |
| Sarah | United Kingdom | The ship was severely damaged by fire at Bristol, Gloucestershire. She became waterlogged the next day. |
| Sprightly | United Kingdom | The mail boat departed from Dominica for Barbados. No further trace, presumed foundered with the loss of all hands. |
| Venerable | United Kingdom | The ship ran aground on the Drummond Bank, in the River Suir. She was on a voyage from Hamburg to Waterford. She was refloated with assistance and completed her voyage. |
| Two unnamed vessels | Flags unknown | A three-masted ship and a brig were driven ashore on Texel, North Holland, Netherlands. |

=== 21 October ===
List of shipwrecks: 21 October 1817
| Ship | State | Description |
|---|---|---|
| Adelphi | United Kingdom | The brig was driven ashore in a hurricane at Bridgetown, Barbados. She was refloated on 8 November. |
| Agenoria | United Kingdom | The ship was wrecked in a hurricane at Martinique with the loss of three of her crew. |
| Alicia | United Kingdom | The schooner was driven ashore in a hurricane at Kingston, Jamaica. |
| Anna Margaretta | Norway | The ship foundered in the Bay of Biscay. Her crew were rescued. She was on a voyage from the Île de Ré, Charente-Maritime, France to Stavanger. |
| Anne and Eliza | United Kingdom | The schooner was driven ashore in a hurricane at Kingston. |
| Antoinette | France | The ship was driven out of Saint-Pierre, Martinique in a hurricane. No further trace. |
| Bazard | United Kingdom | The schooner was driven ashore in a hurricane at Barbados. |
| Benjamin & Joseph | United States | The brig was driven ashore in a hurricane at Martinique. |
| Cæsar | United States | The brig was driven out of Martinique in a hurricane. Reported missing. |
| Celarine | (France) Martinique | The ship was driven out of Saint-Pierre in a hurricane. No further trace. |
| Ceres | France | The ship was wrecked on Crab Island, British Guyana, during a hurricane with the loss of five of her crew. |
| Crown Prince | United Kingdom | The barque was driven ashore and wrecked in a hurricane at Bridgetown. |
| Dispatch | United States | The brig was driven ashore in a hurricane at Pigeon Island. |
| Earl Sandwich | United Kingdom | The sloop was driven ashore in a hurricane at Bridgetown. |
| Echo | French Navy | The corvette was driven out of Martinique in a hurricane. Reported missing. |
| Economy | United Kingdom | The sloop was driven ashore in a hurricane at Bridgetown. |
| Eliza | United Kingdom | The schooner was driven ashore in a hurricane at Barbados. She was declared a total loss and broken up. |
| Eole | France | The ship was driven out of Saint-Pierre in a hurricane, No further trace. |
| Eullala | (flag) France | The ship was driven out of Saint-Pierre in a hurricane. No further trace. |
| Express | (United Kingdom of Great Britain and Ireland) Barbados | The schooner was driven ashore and wrecked in a hurricane at Barbados. |
| Fly | United Kingdom | The schooner was driven ashore in a hurricane at Bridgetown. |
| Forrester | (United Kingdom of Great Britain and Ireland) Barbados | The sloop was driven ashore and wrecked in a hurricane at Barbados. |
| Fox | United Kingdom | The schooner was driven ashore in a hurricane at "Callinque". |
| Good Intent | United Kingdom | The schooner was driven ashore in a hurricane at Kingston. |
| Greyhound | (United Kingdom of Great Britain and Ireland) Barbados | The brig was driven ashore and wrecked in a hurricane at Bridgetown. |
| Hazard | United Kingdom | The schooner was driven ashore in a hurricane at Bridgetown. |
| Heureuse Marie | France | The ship was driven out of Saint-Pierre in a hurricane. No further trace. |
| Isabella | United Kingdom | The ship departed from Newfoundland, British North America for Genoa, Kingdom of Sardinia. No further trace, presumed foundered with the loss of all hands. |
| James | (United Kingdom of Great Britain and Ireland) British North America | The ship was driven ashore in a hurricane at Saint Lucia. |
| Johanna | United States | The brig was driven ashore in a hurricane at Morant Bay, Jamaica. |
| John and Mary | (United Kingdom of Great Britain and Ireland) British North America | The ship was driven ashore in a hurricane at Saint Lucia. |
| Lady Hannah Ellice | United Kingdom | The ship was driven ashore in a hurricane at Saint Lucia. |
| Lady Nelson | United Kingdom | The schooner was driven ashore in a hurricane at Bridgetown. |
| Lark | (United Kingdom of Great Britain and Ireland) British North America | The ship was driven ashore in a hurricane at Saint Lucia. |
| Madeira | United States | The brig was driven ashore in a hurricane at Martinique. |
| Margaretta | French Navy | The ship was wrecked in a hurricane at Saint-Pierre, Martinique. |
| Margarita | United States | The ship was driven ashore in a hurricane at Pigeon Island. |
| Martinico | France | The ship foundered in a hurricane at Martinique with the loss of all hands. |
| Mary | United States | The schooner capsized in a hurricane at Martinique. |
| Mary | United States | The schooner was driven ashore in a hurricane at Morant Bay. |
| Mary | Flag unknown | The schooner was driven out of Martinique in a hurricane. Three crew were rescued by Brown (United Kingdom). |
| Mentor | United States | The schooner was driven ashore and wrecked in a hurricane at Fort-de-France, Martinique, Her crew were rescued. |
| Montgomery | United States | The ship was driven ashore and wrecked on Pigeon Island. Her crew were rescued. |
| Papillon | French Navy | The schooner was drive out of Martinique in a hurricane. Reported missing. |
| Relief | United Kingdom | The schooner was driven ashore in a hurricane at Kingston. |
| Relief | (United Kingdom of Great Britain and Ireland) Bermuda | The schooner was driven ashore in a hurricane at Saint Vincent, Virgin Islands. |
| Retrieve | United Kingdom | The sloop was driven ashore in a hurricane at Kingston. |
| Robert Todd | United Kingdom | The ship was wrecked at Nantucket, Massachusetts. Her crew were rescued. She was on a voyage from the Turks Islands to Portland, Maine. |
| Rossignol | France | The ship was driven out of Saint-Pierre in a hurricane. No further trace. |
| Sophie | United Kingdom | The ship was driven out of Saint-Pierre in a hurricane. No further trace. |
| Thomas Spencer | United Kingdom | The sloop was driven ashore in a hurricane at Bridgetown. |
| Triumph | United Kingdom | The schooner was driven ashore in a hurricane at "Callinque". |
| Young William | United States | The brig was driven ashore and wrecked in a hurricane at Saint Lucia. |

=== 22 October ===
List of shipwrecks: 22 October 1817
| Ship | State | Description |
|---|---|---|
| Ann | United Kingdom | The ship was driven ashore and damaged in the Dardanelles, Ottoman Empire. She was refloated in November and taken in to Constantinople for repairs. |
| Carl Johan | Sweden | The ship was wrecked on the Haisborough Sands, in the North Sea of the coast of Norfolk, United Kingdom. Her crew survived. She was on a voyage from Gävle to Lisbon, Portugal. Carl Johan was refloated and taken in tow by two fishing vessels,but subsequently came ashore at Great Yarmouth, Norfolk. |
| Friendship | United Kingdom | The ship was wrecked on Cape Breton Island, British North America. |
| Industry | United Kingdom | The ship struck The Platters and was severely damaged. She was on a voyage from Antwerp, Netherlands to Liverpool, Lancashire. |
| John & Jane | United Kingdom | The ship ran aground off Dungarvan, County Waterford. She was on a voyage from Bristol, Gloucestershire, to Dungarvan. |
| 16 unnamed vessels | Flags unknown | The ships were driven ashore on Barbadoes in a hurricane. Five were refloated. |
| Unnamed | French Navy | The frigate foundered in Fort Royal Bay, Martinique with the loss of all hands. |

=== 23 October ===
List of shipwrecks: 23 October 1817
| Ship | State | Description |
|---|---|---|
| Betsey | United Kingdom | The ship struck the Stanford Sand, in the North Sea and was consequently beached at Lowestoft, Suffolk. |
| Confiance | France | The ship was wrecked on The Rattler. She was on a voyage from Havre de Grâce to Rouen, Seine-Inférieure. |
| Percival | United Kingdom | The ship ran aground on the Black Middens, in the North Sea off South Shields, County Durham. She was later refloated. |
| Satrauen | Danzig | The ship was wrecked on the Goodwin Sands, Kent, United Kingdom with the loss of all hands. |
| Spring | United Kingdom | The ship ran aground on the Black Middens. She was later refloated and found to be severely leaky. |
| Three unnamed vessels | United Kingdom | Two sloops and a schooner ran aground on the Black Middens. |

=== 25 October ===
List of shipwrecks: 25 October 1817
| Ship | State | Description |
|---|---|---|
| William and Mary | United Kingdom | The packet boat struck the Wolff Rocks, in the Bristol Channel off Flat Holm and foundered with the loss of 33 of the 56 people on board. She was on a voyage from Bristol, Gloucestershire, to Waterford. |

=== 26 October ===
List of shipwrecks: 26 October 1817
| Ship | State | Description |
|---|---|---|
| Amiraal Kirkkert | Netherlands | The schooner foundered whilst on a voyage from the San Blas Islands to Kingston, Jamaica. Four survivors were rescued by the schooner Tickler (United Kingdom). |
| Eliza | United Kingdom | The ship was lost at Colombo, Ceylon. She was on a voyage from London to Trincomalee, Ceylon. |
| Esperence | France | The ship sank at Havre de Grâce, Seine-Inférieure. She was on a voyage from Les Sables-d'Olonne, Vendée to Le Tréport, Seine-Inférieure. |
| Golub | Russia | The ship was wrecked near Kola. Her crew were rescued. She was on a voyage from Arkhangelsk to Amsterdam, North Holland, Netherlands. |

=== 27 October ===
List of shipwrecks: 28 October 1817
| Ship | State | Description |
|---|---|---|
| Active | United Kingdom | The ship was driven ashore at Campbeltown, Argyllshire. She was on a voyage from Quebec City, Lower Canada, British North America, to Dublin. |
| John | United Kingdom | The ship was wrecked on Grand Manan Island. Her crew were rescued. She was on a voyage from Halifax, Nova Scotia, British North America, to the Bay of Fundy. |

=== 28 October ===
List of shipwrecks: 28 October 1817
| Ship | State | Description |
|---|---|---|
| Eweretta | United Kingdom | The ship departed from Quebec City, British North America. No further trace. |
| Monarch | United Kingdom | The ship departed from Quebec City. No further trace. |
| Montreal | United Kingdom | The ship departed from Quebec City. No further trace. |

=== 29 October ===
List of shipwrecks: 29 October 1817
| Ship | State | Description |
|---|---|---|
| Autumn | United Kingdom | During a voyage from Quebec City, Lower Canada, British North America, to Dundee, Forfarshire, Scotland, the ship was wrecked on the coast of Iceland with the loss of her entire crew of 20. |

=== 30 October ===
List of shipwrecks: 30 October 1817
| Ship | State | Description |
|---|---|---|
| Dirk | Netherlands | The ship was driven ashore on Callantsoog, Groningen]. She was on a voyage from Hull, Yorkshire, United Kingdom to Rotterdam, South Holland. |
| Deito Feito | Portugal | The ship was driven ashore at Duncannon, County Waterford, United Kingdom. She was on a voyage from Cork, United Kingdom to Lisbon or St. Ubes. Deito Feito was refloated on 6 November and taken in to Waterford. |
| Jonge Antje | Netherlands | The ship was driven ashore on Callantsoog. She was on a voyage from Hull to Rotterdam. |
| Olivia | United Kingdom | The ship was wrecked on the Willoughby Spit, Virginia, United States. She was on a voyage from Liverpool, Lancashire, to Norfolk, Virginia and/or Richmond, Virginia, United States. |
| Percival | United Kingdom | The ship ran aground on the Black Middens, in the North Sea off South Shields, County Durham, and was severely damaged. |
| William | United Kingdom | The ship was driven ashore at Bovenbergen, Jutland. She was on a voyage from Bridlington, Yorkshire, to Hamburg. |
| Unnamed | Spain | The brig was discovered abandoned by an American fishing vessel. She was taken in to Boston, Massachusetts, United States. |

=== 31 October ===
List of shipwrecks: 31 October 1817
| Ship | State | Description |
|---|---|---|
| Caroline | (Russian Empire) Grand Duchy of Finland | The ship foundered off Marstrand, Sweden. |
| Concordia | Hamburg | The ship foundered off "Warburg". She was on a voyage from Hamburg to Stockholm, Sweden. |
| Diana | United Kingdom | The ship was wrecked in the Shetland Islands with the loss of all but two of her crew. She was on a voyage from a port in New Brunswick, British North America to Berwick upon Tweed, Northumberland. |
| Emlyn | United Kingdom | The ship foundered in the Irish Sea off Holyhead, Anglesey. Her crew were rescued. She was on a voyage from Dublin to Liverpool, Lancashire. |
| Freundschaft | Kolberg | The ship sprang a leak and foundered off Kolberg. Her crew were rescued. She was on a voyage from Kolberg to Memel, Prussia. |
| Penrhyn Castle | United Kingdom | The ship was driven ashore 20 nautical miles (37 km) from Strömstad, Sweden. She was on a voyage from London to Pillau, Prussia. |
| Plato | United Kingdom | The ship foundered in the North Sea 70 nautical miles (130 km) off Whitby, Yorkshire. |

=== Unknown date ===
List of shipwrecks: Unknown date in October 1817
| Ship | State | Description |
|---|---|---|
| Amelia | United Kingdom | The ship foundered in the North Sea in late October whilst on a voyage from Antwerp, Netherlands to Westerwick, Shetland Islands. Her crew were rescued. |
| Argus | United Kingdom | The ship was wrecked on Cape Breton Island, British North America. She was on a voyage from Liverpool, Lancashire, to Miramichi Bay. |
| Arkley Hall | United Kingdom | The ship was driven ashore at "Keeja", Russia. She was on a voyage from Arkhangelsk, Russia, to London. |
| Catherine | United Kingdom | The ship foundered in "Scylicuner Bay", Newfoundland, British North America. |
| Concordia | Russia | The ship was wrecked on Hiiumaa, Russia, in late October. She was on a voyage from Saint Petersburg, Russia, to Havre de Grâce, Seine-Inférieure, France. |
| Dolores | Spain | The ship was lost in the River Plate in late October. |
| Durable | United Kingdom | The ship foundered in the Persian Gulf. |
| Enterprize | France | The ship was lost in the River Plate in late October. |
| Gibraltar | United Kingdom | The ship foundered in the North Sea 2 nautical miles (3.7 km) north of Aberdeen. She was on a voyage from Sunderland, County Durham, to Aberdeen. |
| Henry | United Kingdom | The ship ran aground on the Scharhörn Sand, at the mouth of the Elbe in late October. She was on a voyage from London to Hamburg. She was refloated and put in to Glückstadt, Kingdom of Hanover in a severely leaky condition. |
| Johanna Carsjens | Flag unknown | The ship was wrecked on the Goodwin Sands, Kent, United Kingdom. |
| Mary | United Kingdom | The coaster was wrecked at Ramsey, Isle of Man. |
| Michael | Russia | The ship was lost near "Kouga". Her crew were rescued She was on a voyage from Arkhangelsk to Bergen, Norway. |
| Symmetry | United Kingdom | The ship was driven ashore on Eierland, North Holland, Netherlands. Her crew were rescued. She was on a voyage from Liverpool to Hamburg. |
| Thomas | United Kingdom | The brig foundered in the North Sea off the coast of Norfolk. Wreckage came ashore at Mundesley on 18 October. |
| Three Brodre | Netherlands | The ship was wrecked between Bergen and Stavanger, Norway. More than 300 people were rescued. |
| Triton | United Kingdom | The ship was driven ashore near Trondheim, Norway. She was later refloated and taken in to "Smolen" for repairs. |
| Union | United Kingdom | The ship was wrecked on Soult Island, Orkney Islands. She was on a voyage from Pugwash, Nova Scotia, British North America, to Newcastle upon Tyne, Northumberland. |
| Washington | United States | The ship capsized off Jamaica on or before 14 October. |
| Wassily Wehky | Russia | The ship was drive onto a sandbank near Arkhangelsk by ice and consequently sank. She was on a voyage from Arkhangelsk to Amsterdam, North Holland, Netherlands. |

== November ==
=== 1 November ===
List of shipwrecks: 1 November 1817
| Ship | State | Description |
|---|---|---|
| Alexander | United Kingdom | The full-rigged ship was driven ashore near Strömstadt, Sweden. She was on a voyage from London to Saint Petersburg, Russia. |
| Catharina | Stettin | The ship ran aground at "Warkholm". She was on a voyage from London, United Kingdom to Stettin. She was refloated with assistance. |
| Ellice | United Kingdom | The transport ship was wrecked on the north coast of Spain with the loss of a crew member. One hundred and forty-four passengers and the rest of the crew were rescued. |
| Thetis | United Kingdom | The ship struck a rock at Aspö, Grand Duchy of Finland and lost her rudder. She was on a voyage from Saint Petersburg to Hull, Yorkshire. She put in to Aspö. |
| Unnamed | Sweden | The brig was driven ashore at Rörö. Her crew were rescued. |

=== 2 November ===
List of shipwrecks: 2 November 1817
| Ship | State | Description |
|---|---|---|
| Frederickston | (United Kingdom of Great Britain and Ireland) Jamaica | The ship was wrecked on Grand Cayman Island. Her crew were rescued. She was on a voyage from Jamaica to Saint John, New Brunswick, British North America. |
| Fidelity | United Kingdom | The ship ran aground at Memel, Prussia. She was on a voyage from Liverpool, Lancashire to Memel. She was refloated and taken in to Memel in a leaky condition. |
| Thetis | (Russian Empire) Grand Duchy of Finland | The ship was driven ashore near "Fredricksworth", Denmark. She was on a voyage from Hull, Yorkshire, to Vaasa. |

=== 3 November ===
List of shipwrecks: 3 November 1817
| Ship | State | Description |
|---|---|---|
| Albert | United Kingdom | The ship was driven ashore. She was on a voyage from Newcastle upon Tyne, Northumberland to Saint Petersburg, Russia. She was refloated and taken in to Marstrand, Sweden in a severely leaky condition. |
| Flora | United Kingdom | The ship departed Arkhangelsk, Russia, for Hull, Yorkshire. No further trace, presumed foundered with the loss of all hands. |
| London | United Kingdom | The ship was driven ashore at Dover, Kent. She was refloated with the assistance of HMRC Lively ( Board of Customs). |
| Traveller | United Kingdom | The ship was wrecked near Fredrikstad, Norway, with the loss of seven of her crew. She was on a voyage from Hull to Gothenburg, Sweden. |

=== 4 November ===
List of shipwrecks: 4 November 1817
| Ship | State | Description |
|---|---|---|
| Amethyst | United Kingdom | The ship capsized and sank in the Mediterranean Sea off Alexandria, Egypt. Her crew were rescued. |
| Unnamed | (Russian Empire) Grand Duchy of Finland | The ship was driven ashore and damaged. She was on a voyage from Antwerp, Netherlands to Bjorneborg. She was refloated and taken in to Stavanger, Norway. |

=== 5 November ===
List of shipwrecks: 5 November 1817
| Ship | State | Description |
|---|---|---|
| Barbara | United Kingdom | The ship was wrecked at "Ballinaby". She was on a voyage from Sligo to Glasgow, Renfrewshire. |
| Caroline | Denmark | The ship was wrecked at Lerwick, Shetland Islands, United Kingdom of Great Britain and Ireland with the loss of all hands. She was on a voyage from Copenhagen to Málaga, Spain. |
| Favourite | United Kingdom | The ship departed from Pictou, Nova Scotia, British North America, for Aberdeen. No further trace, presumed foundered with the loss of all hands. |
| Golden Fleece | United Kingdom | The ship was wrecked on the Swelly Rock, in the Irish Sea off Beaumaris, Anglesey. She was on a voyage from Bangor, Caernarvonshire, to London. |
| Industry | United Kingdom | The sloop was wrecked on Swona, Orkney Islands. There were two survivors. She was on a voyage from Perth to Hull, Yorkshire. |

=== 6 November ===
List of shipwrecks: 6 November 1817
| Ship | State | Description |
|---|---|---|
| Dolons | Spain | The ship was driven ashore and wrecked at Montevideo, United Provinces of the Río de la Plata. Her crew were rescued. |
| Enterprise | France | The ship was driven ashore at "Porte de la India", South America. |
| Shannon | United Kingdom | The ship sprang a lead and was abandoned in the Atlantic Ocean (43°35′N 24°30′W). Her crew were rescued by Duke of Wellington (United Kingdom). Shannon was on a voyage from Newfoundland, British North America to Málaga, Spain. |
| Unnamed | United Kingdom | The fishing boat was wrecked on the Scroby Sands, Norfolk with the loss of eight of her nine crew. |

=== 7 November ===
List of shipwrecks: 7 November 1817
| Ship | State | Description |
|---|---|---|
| Charles | Flag unknown | The ship ran aground on the Goodwin Sands, Kent, United Kingdom. She was on a voyage from Gothenburg, Sweden to Bordeaux, Gironde, France. She was refloated and put in to Ramsgate, Kent. |
| Do | (United Kingdom of Great Britain and Ireland) Bahamas | The ship was wrecked in the Abaco Islands. She was on a voyage from Philadelphia, Pennsylvania, United States, to Nassau, Bahamas. |
| Favourite | United Kingdom | The brig was last sighted on this date whilst on a voyage from Pictou, Nova Scotia, British North America, to Aberdeen. Presumed subsequently foundered with the loss of all hands. |
| Grenville Bay | United Kingdom | The ship ran aground on the Whiting Sand, in the North Sea off the coast of Essex. She was on a voyage from Newcastle upon Tyne, Northumberland to London. She was refloated with the assistance of a salvage smack and a boat and taken in to Harwich, Essex. |
| Pauline | France | The ship was wrecked on the coast of Brazil. Her crew were rescued. |
| Pilar | Spain | The ship was wrecked near Muros. She was on a voyage from Corcubion to A Coruña. |

=== 8 November ===
List of shipwrecks: 8 November 1817
| Ship | State | Description |
|---|---|---|
| Argo | United Kingdom | The ship was driven ashore and wrecked at Flamborough Head, Yorkshire, Her crew were rescued. She was on a voyage from London to South Shields, County Durham. |
| Astrea | United Kingdom | The ship ran aground, capsized and was wrecked at St. Mawes, Cornwall. |
| Augustus | United Kingdom | The ship was wrecked on Islay, Inner Hebrides, with the loss of all hands. she was on a voyage from Miramichi, New Brunswick, British North America, to Liverpool, Lancashire. |
| Hopewell | United Kingdom | The barque was abandoned in the Atlantic Ocean. Her crew were rescued by Alexander (United Kingdom). Hopewell was on a voyage from Miramichi to Ayr and/or Leith, Lothian. She was discovered off the Butt of Lewis, Outer Hebrides on 21 November by Patriot (United Kingdom). |
| James | United Kingdom | The ship was wrecked on the Saintes. Her crew were rescued. She was on a voyage from Bordeaux, Gironde, France, to Plymouth, Devon |
| Knaggs | United Kingdom | The ship was lost off Sumburgh Head, Shetland Islands with the loss of all hands. |
| Palermo | United Kingdom | The ship was driven ashore near Flamborough Head, Yorkshire. She was on a voyage from Broadstairs, Kent to South Shields, County Durham. She was refloated and put in to Bridlington, Yorkshire. |
| Peggy | United States | The ship was lost at Cape Cod, Massachusetts. She was on a voyage from the Bahamas to Boston, Massachusetts. |

=== 9 November ===
List of shipwrecks: 9 November 1817
| Ship | State | Description |
|---|---|---|
| Dasher | United Kingdom | The ship sprang a leak and was abandoned in the Atlantic Ocean. Her crew were rescued by the brig Fortitude (United Kingdom). |
| Ellice | United Kingdom | The transport ship wrecked on the Punta de Estaca de Bares, Spain, with the loss of about 30 lives. She was on a voyage from London to Gibraltar. |
| Helmsley | United Kingdom | The ship was wrecked at Sandwich Bay, Shetland Islands, with the loss of a crew member. She was on a voyage from Arkhangelsk, Russia, to London. |
| James and Charlotte | United Kingdom | The ship struck a sunken wreck and was consequently beached near Tarragona, Spain. She was subsequently wrecked. James and Charlotte was on a voyage from Genoa, Kingdom of Sardinia to London. |

=== 11 November ===
List of shipwrecks: 11 November 1817
| Ship | State | Description |
|---|---|---|
| Adrastus | United States | The ship was driven ashore at Long Beach, North Carolina. She was on a voyage from the Bahamas to Kennebec, Maine. |
| Frederick | Kingdom of Sardinia | The ship was driven ashore at Marstrand, Sweden. |
| Louisa Ulrica | Greifswald | The ship was driven ashore at Marstrand. |
| Maria Louisa | Portugal | The ship was lost with the loss of all but one of her crew. She was on a voyage from Morlaix, Finistère, France to Lisbon. |
| New Expedition | United Kingdom | The ship was driven ashore at The Mumbles, Glamorgan. All on board were rescued. She was on a voyage from Swansea, Glamorgan, to Bristol, Gloucestershire. |
| Phœnix | United Kingdom | The ship was wrecked on the Gunfleet Sand, in the North Sea. Her crew were rescued. She was on a voyage from South Shields, County Durham, to London. |

=== 12 November ===
List of shipwrecks: 12 November 1817
| Ship | State | Description |
|---|---|---|
| Albion | United Kingdom | The ship was driven ashore at Quebec City, Lower Canada, British North America. |
| Bea Flora | Portugal | The schooner was wrecked at Vigo, Spain. |
| Bee | United Kingdom | The ship was driven ashore near Saltfleet, Lincolnshire. She was on a voyage from Great Yarmouth, Norfolk, to Hull, Yorkshire. |
| Berry Castle | United Kingdom | The ship was driven ashore near Scotstown Head. She was on a voyage from Miramichi, New Brunswick, British North America, to Aberdeen. |
| Wilhelmina | Sweden | The ship was driven ashore on Gotland. She was on a voyage from Gävle to Lisbon, Portugal. Wilhelmina was later refloated. |

=== 13 November ===
List of shipwrecks: 13 November 1817
| Ship | State | Description |
|---|---|---|
| Anna Maria | Prussia | The ship foundered off Thisted, Denmark. She was on a voyage from Königsberg to Amsterdam, North Holland, Netherlands. |
| Beulah | United Kingdom | The ship was wrecked on the Haisborough Sands, in the North Sea off the coast of Norfolk. Her crew were rescued. She was on a voyage from London to Hull, Yorkshire. |
| Castlereagh | United Kingdom | The ship was driven ashore at Point Lepreau, Newfoundland, British North America. Her crew were rescued. She was on a voyage from the Turks Islands to Saint John, New Brunswick, British North America. Castlereagh was refloated on 7 December and taken in to St. John |
| Providence | United Kingdom | The ship was driven ashore and wrecked at Frosswick, Shetland Islands. She was on a voyage from Arkhangelsk, Russia, to London. The wreck was plundered by the local inhabitants. |
| Thomas | United Kingdom | The ship was driven ashore at Dungarvan, County Waterford. She was on a voyage from New Orleans, Louisiana, to Liverpool, Lancashire. |
| William | United Kingdom | The ship capsized and was wrecked at Fowey, Cornwall. |

=== 14 November ===
List of shipwrecks: 14 November 1817
| Ship | State | Description |
|---|---|---|
| Hester | United Kingdom | The brig was driven ashore on the Briggs, near Bangor, Caernarvonshire. |
| John | United Kingdom | The schooner was driven ashore and wrecked at Cruden Bay, Aberdeenshire. Her crew survived. She was on a voyage from South Shields, County Durham, to Dublin. |
| Lord Nelson | United Kingdom | The ship collidedd with another vessel in the North Sea and was severely damaged. She was on a voyage from Newcastle upon Tyne, Northumberland to Guernsey, Channel Islands. She put in to Scarborough, Yorkshire. |
| Providence | United Kingdom | The ship capsized at Sheerness, Kent. She was refloated but found to be severely damaged. |
| William and Mary | United Kingdom | The schooner was driven ashore and wrecked at Peterhead, Aberdeenshire. Her crew were rescued. |

=== 15 November ===
List of shipwrecks: 15 November 1817
| Ship | State | Description |
|---|---|---|
| Andalusia | United Kingdom | The ship struck the Corton Sand, in the North Sea off the coast of Suffolk and was consequently beached at Great Yarmouth, Norfolk. |
| Camperdown | United Kingdom | The full-rigged ship was wrecked at Sumburgh Head, Shetland Islands with the loss of all hands. |
| Christopher | United Kingdom | The ship was lost near Sumburgh Head with the loss of all hands. She was on a voyage from Riga, Russia, to Liverpool, Lancashire. |
| Doris | United States | The ship sprang a leak and was abandoned in the Grand Banks of Newfoundland. She was on a voyage from Baltimore, Maryland, to Amsterdam, North Holland, Netherlands. |
| Fame | United Kingdom | The schooner was wrecked at Aberdeen with the loss of a crew member. She was on a voyage from Riga, Russia, to Arbroath, Forfarshire. |
| Helmsley | United Kingdom | The ship was lost off Sumburgh Head with the loss of a crew member. |
| James and Mary | United Kingdom | The schooner was driven ashore and severely damaged at Aberdeen. |
| John | United Kingdom | The schooner was driven ashore in Cruden Bay. Her crew survived. She was on a voyage from South Shields, County Durham to Dublin. |
| Li La Too Zee | Netherlands | The sloop was wrecked on Fair Isle, United Kingdom. She was on a voyage from Maassluis South Holland to "North Faroe". |
| Mary | United Kingdom | The ship foundered in the North Sea off Robin Hood's Bay, Yorkshire. Her crew were rescued. |
| Providence | United Kingdom | The ship was wrecked at Sumburgh Head with the loss of all hands. She was on a voyage from Arkhangelsk, Russia, to London. |
| Rifleman | United Kingdom | The sloop struck rocks at Redcar, Yorkshire, and was wrecked. Her crew survived. |
| Unnamed | Flag unknown | The ship was lost off Sumburgh Head with the loss of all hands. |

=== 16 November ===
List of shipwrecks: 16 November 1817
| Ship | State | Description |
|---|---|---|
| Elizabeth | United Kingdom | The ship, which had been stolen by mutineers at the Cape of Good Hope on 11 November, was deliberately run ashore and wrecked at the mouth of the Elephant River with the loss of one life. |

=== 17 November ===
List of shipwrecks: 17 November 1817
| Ship | State | Description |
|---|---|---|
| Berkeley | United Kingdom | The ship ran aground on the Colorados, off the coast of Cuba. She was on a voyage from Jamaica to Virginia, United States. Berkeley was plundered by the Spanish, who burnt her on 1 December. |
| Eugene | France | The ship was driven ashore and wrecked at Brook, Isle of Wight, United Kingdom. She was on a voyage from Marseille, Bouches-du-Rhône, to Dunkerque, Nord. |

=== 18 November ===
List of shipwrecks: 18 November 1817
| Ship | State | Description |
|---|---|---|
| Voucher | United States | The ship was lost in the Currituck Inlet. All on board were rescued. She was on a voyage from New York to Charleston, South Carolina. |

=== 19 November ===
List of shipwrecks: 19 November 1817
| Ship | State | Description |
|---|---|---|
| Credenzon | Sweden | The ship foundered off "Studgard". Her crew were rescued. She was on a voyage from Karlskrona to Havre de Grâce, Seine-Inférieure, France. |
| Harmonie | Portugal | The ship passed through the Øresund whilst on a voyage from Riga, Russia, to Lisbon. No further trace, presumed foundered with the loss of all hands |
| Voucher | United States | The full-rigged ship was lost in the Currituck Inlet at Chicamacomico, North Carolina. All on board were rescued. She was on a voyage from New York to Charleston, South Carolina. |

=== 20 November ===
List of shipwrecks: 20 November 1817
| Ship | State | Description |
|---|---|---|
| Sarah | United Kingdom | The ship caught fire at Bristol, Gloucestershire. She was later sold, repaired, and continued to sail. |

=== 21 November ===
List of shipwrecks: 21 November 1817
| Ship | State | Description |
|---|---|---|
| Caroline | France | The ship was lost off "Patten". She was on a voyage from Saint Petersburg, Russia, to Rouen, Seine-Inférieure. |
| Europe | United Kingdom | The ship sprang a leak and was abandoned in the Atlantic Ocean. She was on a voyage from the Isle of May to Boston, Massachusetts, United States. |
| Friends | United Kingdom | The ship foundered in the Baltic Sea off the Dagerort Lighthouse, Denmark. Her crew were rescued. She was on a voyage from London to Saint Petersburg, Russia. |

=== 22 November ===
List of shipwrecks: 22 November 1817
| Ship | State | Description |
|---|---|---|
| Augusta | Prussia | The ship was driven ashore between Memel and Pillau with the loss of two of her crew. She was on a voyage from Memel to Lübeck. |
| Garland | United Kingdom | The ship was wrecked at Faial Island, Azores, Portugal. Her crew were rescued. |
| Nicolay & Ann | Russia | The ship was lost off "Stortewelk". Her crew were rescued. She was on a voyage from Saint Petersburg to Amsterdam, North Holland, Netherlands. |
| Vrieundschap | Netherlands | The ship was lost off "Stortewelk". Her crew were rescued. She was on a voyage from Norway to Harlingen, Friesland. |

=== 23 November ===
List of shipwrecks: 23 November 1817
| Ship | State | Description |
|---|---|---|
| Ariadne | United Kingdom | The ship was wrecked near Stromness, Orkney Islands. She was on a voyage from Saint Petersburg, Russia, to Liverpool, Lancashire. |
| Maria | United Kingdom | The ship was lost near Thisted, Denmark. Her crew were rescued. She was on a voyage from Saint Petersburg to London. |
| Old Friend | United Kingdom | The ship was driven ashore and wrecked on the coast of Jutland. Her crew were rescued. She was on a voyage from Riga, Russia, to London. |
| Sportsman | United Kingdom | The ship was wrecked on Anholt, Denmark. Her crew were rescued. She was on a voyage from Hull, Yorkshire, to Pillau, Prussia. |

=== 24 November ===
List of shipwrecks: 24 November 1817
| Ship | State | Description |
|---|---|---|
| Advice | United Kingdom | The ship was lost near Christiansand, Norway. She was on a voyage from Arkhangelsk, Russia, to Hull, Yorkshire. |
| Agnes | United Kingdom | The ship was driven ashore in the St. Lawrence River. |
| Favourite | United Kingdom | The ship was wrecked on Hare Island. She was on a voyage from Quebec City, Lower Canada, British North America, to Madeira, Portugal. |
| Maria Joze | Spain | The brig was captured by the privateer Congress (United States) whilst on a voyage from Montego Bay, Jamaica, to Manzanelle de Cuba, Cuba. She was set afire and sunk. |
| Thomas and Sally | United Kingdom | The ship ran aground and sank at Guernsey, Channel Islands. She was on a voyage from Newcastle upon Tyne, Northumberland, to Guernsey. |
| Vrow Anna Catharina | Lübeck | The ship was wrecked near Memel, Prussia with the loss of all but two of her crew. She was on a voyage from Memel to Lübeck. |

=== 25 November ===
List of shipwrecks: 25 November 1817
| Ship | State | Description |
|---|---|---|
| Acorn | United Kingdom | The ship was driven ashore near Memel, Prussia. She was refloated in late June 1818 and taken in to Memel for repairs. |
| Christopher | United Kingdom | The ship was driven ashore at Ince, Cheshire. She was on a voyage from Charleston, South Carolina, to Liverpool, Lancashire. She was refloated in December and taken in to Liverpool. |
| Garland | United Kingdom | The ship was fired upon by Marquis d'Anjera (Portugal) and shore-based artillery at Faial Island, Azores, in error. She subsequently drove ashore and was wrecked. |
| Lykens Prove | Russia | The ship was driven ashore near Karlskrona, Sweden. She was on a voyage from Pärnu to Amsterdam, North Holland, Netherlands. |
| Nancy | Sweden | The ship was driven ashore at Liverpool. She was on a voyage from Stockholm to New York, United States. |
| Scots Craig | United Kingdom | The ship was wrecked in the North Sea off Neuwerk with the loss of a crew member. She was on a voyage from London to Hamburg. |
| Unnamed | Flag unknown | The ship was wrecked in Sandwood Bay, Sutherland, United Kingdom with the loss of all hands. |

=== 26 November ===
List of shipwrecks: 26 November 1817
| Ship | State | Description |
|---|---|---|
| Ardaiser | (United Kingdom of Great Britain and Ireland) Ceylon | The ketch was driven ashore and wrecked at Colombo. Her crew were rescued. |
| Eliza | United Kingdom | The transport ship was driven ashore and wrecked at Colombo. Her crew were rescued. She was on a voyage from London to Trincomalee, Ceylon. |
| Eliza | United Kingdom | The brig was driven ashore and wrecked at Colombo. Her crew were rescued. |
| Pembroke | United Kingdom | The ship was driven ashore and wrecked at Colombo with the loss of two lives. |
| Vittoria | Spain | The ship departed from Havana, Cuba, for St. Andero. No further trace, presumed foundered with the loss of all hands. |
| Zephyr | United Kingdom | The ship was wrecked at Colombo. |

=== 27 November ===
List of shipwrecks: 27 November 1817
| Ship | State | Description |
|---|---|---|
| Alexis | United Kingdom | The ship was driven ashore and wrecked near Memel, Prussia. She was on a voyage from London to Memel. |
| Helen & Peggy | United Kingdom | The ship was driven ashore between Ayr and Troon, Ayrshire. |
| Maria Elizabeth | Danzig | The ship ran aground on Terschelling, Friesland, Netherlands. She was refloated but then foundered. Her crew were rescued. Maria Elizabeth was on a voyage from Danzig to Amsterdam, North Holland, Netherlands. |
| Osira | Prussia | The ship was wrecked near Memel with the loss of seven of her crew. She was on a voyage from Liverpool, Lancashire, United Kingdom to Memel. |

=== 28 November ===
List of shipwrecks: 28 November 1817
| Ship | State | Description |
|---|---|---|
| Admiral Colpoys | United Kingdom | While anchored in a bay on the coast of South Georgia, the whaler was pushed ashore and wrecked by an iceberg that floated into the bay. Her crew were rescued. |
| Garland | United Kingdom | The ship was wrecked on Faial Island, Azores. Her crew were rescued. |

=== 29 November ===
List of shipwrecks: 29 November 1817
| Ship | State | Description |
|---|---|---|
| Caroline | France | The ship was struck by lightning and sunk in the Atlantic Ocean with the loss of all but four of her crew. She was on a voyage from Port-au-Prince, Haiti to Havre de Grâce, Seine-Inférieure. |
| Moa | United Kingdom | The schooner was driven ashore and wrecked at Boddam, Aberdeenshire. Her crew were rescued. She was on a voyage from Aberdeen to Peterhead, Aberdeenshire. View the source indicated. The vessel is 'Marquis of Huntley', belonging to Fochabers |

=== 30 November ===
List of shipwrecks: 30 November 1817
| Ship | State | Description |
|---|---|---|
| Edward | Netherlands | The ship was driven ashore near "Papensee". She was on a voyage from Amsterdam, North Holland, to Danzig. |

=== Unknown date ===
List of shipwrecks: Unknown date in November 1817
| Ship | State | Description |
|---|---|---|
| Acorn | United Kingdom | The ship ran aground near Memel, Prussia. She was refloated at the end of July 1818. |
| Belvidera | Denmark | The ship was wrecked in the Shetland Islands, United Kingdom with the loss of all hands before 15 November. |
| Diana | United Kingdom | The ship struck a rock and foundered in the North Sea off Lista, Norway. She was on a voyage from Rostock to Newcastle upon Tyne, Northumberland. |
| Durham | United Kingdom | The ship was driven ashore on the Ostergarno Holme, Sweden, in mid-November. |
| Favourite | United Kingdom | The brig parted company with Granite (United Kingdom) in the Atlantic Ocean on 7 or 8 November. No further trace, presumed foundered with the loss of all hands. Favourite was on a voyage from Pictou, Nova Scotia, British North America to Aberdeen. |
| General Hunter | United Kingdom | The ship was wrecked in Loch Skipport before 22 November. She was on a voyage from Gothenburg, Sweden, to Newry, County Down. |
| General Knox | United States | The ship foundered off the coast of Belize. |
| Hazard | United Kingdom | The ship was lost near Hälsö, Sweden. her crew were rescued. She was on a voyage from Liverpool, Lancashire, to Stockholm, Sweden. |
| Henrietta | Russia | The ship was wrecked on Saaremaa in early November. She was on a voyage from Saint Petersburg to Lisbon, Portugal. |
| Isabella | United Kingdom | The ship was sighted off Gibraltar whilst on a voyage from St. John's, Newfoundland, to Genoa, Kingdom of Sardinia. No further trace, presumed foundered in the Mediterranean Sea with the loss of all hands. |
| Jonge Carl | Lübeck | The ship was lost near Kronstadt, Russia. She was on a voyage from Lübeck to Saint Petersburg, Russia. |
| Louisa | United Kingdom | The brig was wrecked in the River Plate in early November. |
| Marchioness Wellesley | United Kingdom | The ship ran aground in the Hooghly River. She was refloated and put back to Calcutta, India for repairs. |
| Mary and Eliza | United Kingdom | The ship departed from Dublin for New York. No further trace, presumed foundered with the loss of all hands. |
| Netley | United Kingdom | The ship departed from Gibraltar for Jersey, Channel Islands. No further trace, presumed foundered with the loss of all hands. |
| Providence | United Kingdom | The ship was driven ashore at Espozenda, Portugal. She was on a voyage from Faro, Portugal, to London. |
| Rebecca | France | The ship departed Marseille, Bouches-du-Rhône, for Smyrna, Greece. No further trace, presumed foundered in the Mediterranean Sea with the loss of all hands. |
| Sarah | United Kingdom | The ship was lost off Candia. Her crew were rescued. She was on a voyage from Genoa, Grand Duchy of Tuscany to Candia and Trieste. |
| Susan | United States | The ship was abandoned in the Atlantic Ocean. |
| Thetis | United Kingdom | The ship was abandoned in the Mediterranean Sea. She was discovered on 30 November at 38°47′N 7°14′E by Wylam (United Kingdom) and was taken in to Malta. Thetis was on a voyage from Newcastle upon Tyne, Northumberland, to Naples, Kingdom of the Two Sicilies. |
| Unnamed | Sweden | The ship sank neat Thisted, Denmark before 17 November. Her crew were rescued. |

== December ==
=== 1 December ===
List of shipwrecks: 1 December 1817
| Ship | State | Description |
|---|---|---|
| Mayflower | United Kingdom | The ship was driven ashore at Domesnes, Norway. She was on a voyage from Riga, Russia, to Hull, Yorkshire. Mayflower was refloated on 3 December and made for Bolderaa, Russia. |

=== 3 December ===
List of shipwrecks: 3 December 1817
| Ship | State | Description |
|---|---|---|
| Bessey | United Kingdom | The sloop sank in the North Sea off Staithes, Yorkshire. Her crew were rescued. |
| Emelie | France | The ship was driven ashore on the west coast of Bermuda. She was on a voyage from Saint-Domingue to a French port. Emelie was later refloated. |
| Hoppet | Sweden | The ship foundered off the coast of Norway. She was on a voyage from Stockholm to Amsterdam, North Holland, Netherlands. |
| Mary & Betsey | United States | The ship sprang a leak and was abandoned off the Cayman Islands. She was on a voyage from Baltimore, Maryland, to New Orleans, Louisiana. |
| Sentolo | United Kingdom | The sloop capsized in the Pentland Firth with the loss of at least five lives. She was on a voyage from Inverness to Kirkwall, Orkney Islands. |

=== 4 December ===
List of shipwrecks: 4 December 1817
| Ship | State | Description |
|---|---|---|
| Henrietta | Stettin | The ship was driven ashore and wrecked between Swinemünde, Swedish Pomerania and Stettin. Her crew were rescued. She was on a voyage from Trieste to Stettin |
| Hiram | United Kingdom | The ship was run into by Ruth (United Kingdom) at Buenos Aires, Argentina and was severely damaged. She was on a voyage from Buenos Aires to Liverpool, Lancashire. She proceeded on her voyage after temporary repairs. |
| Master Mason | United Kingdom | The ship foundered in the English Channel off Guernsey, Channel Islands. Her crew were rescued. She was on a voyage from Plymouth, Devon, to London. |
| Sally | United Kingdom | The boat was wrecked at Easington, County Durham, with the loss of both of her crew. |
| Vrouw Agatha | Netherlands | The ship ran aground at Brielle, South Holland. She was refloated with the assistance of two pilot boats. |

=== 5 December ===
List of shipwrecks: 5 December 1817
| Ship | State | Description |
|---|---|---|
| Burton | United Kingdom | The ship ran aground on the Nore. She was on a voyage from Saint Petersburg, Russia, to London. Burton was later refloated. |
| Ford | United Kingdom | The brig was wrecked at Forvie, Aberdeenshire. |
| Goede Hoop | Netherlands | The ship foundered in the Baltic Sea off Bornholm, Denmark. She was on a voyage from Memel, Prussia to Amsterdam, North Holland. |
| Jong Gerret | Netherlands | The ship was driven ashore at Orfordness, Suffolk, United Kingdom. She was on a voyage from Rotterdam, South Holland to London. She was refloated and taken in to Orfordness. |
| Wilton | United Kingdom | The ship ran aground off the Isle of Grain, Kent. She was on a voyage from Livorno, Grand Duchy of Tuscany to London. |

=== 6 December ===
List of shipwrecks: 6 December 1817
| Ship | State | Description |
|---|---|---|
| Gemini | United Kingdom | The ship was driven ashore in Bootle Bay. She was on a voyage from Messina, Kingdom of the Two Sicilies to Liverpool, Lancashire. |
| Jeune Henri | France | The ship was driven ashore near Honfleur, Calvados. She was on a voyage from London, United Kingdom to Rouen, Seine-Inférieure Jeune Henri was later refloated and put into Honfleur. |
| Minerva | United Kingdom | The ship foundered in the Black Sea off Feodosiya, Russia. Her crew were rescued. |
| Patrick & Bridget | United Kingdom | The ship was lost near Dungarvan, County Waterford. She was on a voyage from Cork to Dublin. |
| Polito | United Kingdom | The schooner was wrecked at Deerness, Orkney Islands. Her crew were rescued. She was on a voyage from Riga, Russia, to Belfast, County Antrim. |

=== 7 December ===
List of shipwrecks: 7 December 1817
| Ship | State | Description |
|---|---|---|
| Andreas | Sweden | The ship was driven ashore and wrecked at Skanör. Her crew were rescued. She was on a voyage from Stockholm to Antwerp, Netherlands. |
| Elizabeth & Sally | United Kingdom | The ship was driven ashore in the River Shannon. |
| Fame | United Kingdom | The ship was driven ashore in the River Shannon. |
| HMS Martin | Royal Navy | The sloop-of-war foundered in the Atlantic Ocean 8 nautical miles (15 km) off Kilrush, County Clare, with the loss of five of her crew. |
| Mary | United Kingdom | The ship was driven ashore and wrecked on Scattery Island, County Clare. Her crew were rescued. |
| Rolla | United Kingdom | The ship departed from Paraíba, Brazil for Liverpool, Lancashire. No further trace, presumed foundered with the loss of all hands. |
| Sally | United Kingdom | The ship was driven ashore and wrecked west of St. Ives, Cornwall. She was on a voyage from Youghal, County Cork, to Plymouth, Devon. |
| Union | United Kingdom | The ship was driven ashore and severely damaged in the River Shannon. She was on a voyage from Arkhangelsk, Russia, to Lisbon, Portugal. |
| Walton | United Kingdom | The ship was wrecked on Whalsay, Shetland Islands. Her crew were rescued. She was on a voyage from Arkhangelsk, Russia, to Liverpool, Lancashire. |

=== 8 December ===
List of shipwrecks: 8 December 1817
| Ship | State | Description |
|---|---|---|
| Elizabeth | United Kingdom | The ship was driven ashore and severely damaged near St. Ives, Cornwall. She was on a voyage from Cork to London. She was refloated and taken in to Padstow. |
| Friendship | United Kingdom | The ship was driven ashore near Padstow, Cornwall, and severely damaged. She was on a voyage from Belfast, County Antrim, to London. Friendship was later refloated and taken in to Padstow. |
| Hoffnung | Bremen | The ship foundered in the North Sea with the loss of all but one of her crew. She was on a voyage from Bremerlee to Colchester, Essex, United Kingdom. |
| Indian | United Kingdom | The full-rigged ship was wrecked near Plouénan, Finistère, France with the loss of all on board, about 200 people. She was on a voyage from Portsmouth, Hampshire, to St. Thomas, Virgin Islands. |
| Mary | United Kingdom | The ship foundered in the Irish Sea off Holyhead, Anglesey. Her crew were rescued. She was on a voyage from Newfoundland, British North America to Liverpool, Lancashire. |
| Mary Ann | United Kingdom | The ship was wrecked near Kilrush, County Clare. Her crew were rescued. she was on a voyage from Limerick to Galway. |
| St. Patrick and Bridget | United Kingdom | The ship was driven ashore and wrecked at Dungarvan, County Waterford. She was on a voyage from Cork to Dublin. |
| Susannah | United Kingdom | The ship was driven ashore in the Isles of Scilly. She was on a voyage from London to Westport, County Mayo. |
| Thistle | United Kingdom | The ship ran aground at Ramsey, Isle of Man. She was on a voyage from the Clyde to Naples, Kingdom of the Two Sicilies and Livorno, Grand Duchy of Tuscany. She was refloated and taken in to Ramsey for repairs. |
| York | United Kingdom | The ship was driven ashore near Sunderland, County Durham. She was later refloated. |
| Unnamed | Flag unknown | The ship was wrecked near Audierne, Finistère with the loss of all hands. |

=== 9 December ===
List of shipwrecks: 9 December 1817
| Ship | State | Description |
|---|---|---|
| Alexander | France | The ship was wrecked near Brest, Finistère. |
| Beaver | United Kingdom | The ship sprang a leak and foundered off Rae Point, Isle of Man. Her crew were rescued. |
| Ben and Susan | United Kingdom | The brig foundered in the Atlantic Ocean off Viana do Castelo, Portugal, with the loss of all hands. |
| Charles | United Kingdom | The ship foundered in the Bay of Biscay off the Cordouan Lighthouse, Gironde, France. Her crew were rescued by Frederick William (France). Charles was on a voyage from London to Bordeaux, Gironde. |
| Concordia | Hamburg | The ship was lost at Bilbao, Spain. She was on a voyage from Hamburg to Bilbao. |
| Fame | United Kingdom | The ship was lost off the Île de Batz, Finistère. She was on a voyage from London to Jamaica. |
| Flora | United Kingdom | The ship ran aground in the English Channel off Roscoff, Finistère, France. All on board were rescued. She was on a voyage from London to Barbados. |
| General Brock | United Kingdom | The ship ran aground on the Anholt Reef, Denmark. She was on a voyage from Pernau, Livonia, Russian Empire, to Liverpool, Lancashire. General Brock was later refloated and put into Helsingør, Denmark. |
| Georgiana Packet | Hamburg | The ship departed from Hamburg for Havana, Cuba. No further trace, presumed foundered with the loss of all hands. |
| Jane | United Kingdom | The ship ran aground on the Brake Sand, in the North Sea off the coast of Kent. She was on a voyage from London to the West Indies. She was refloated and resumed her voyage. |
| Lilly | United Kingdom | The ship was wrecked on the Île de Batz with the loss of thirteen lives. She was on a voyage from Lisbon, Portugal, to Liverpool. |
| Molly | United Kingdom | The ship foundered in the Irish Sea off Beaumaris, Anglesey. |
| Prompto | Portugal | The ship was driven ashore and wrecked at Brest. She was on a voyage from Saint Petersburg, Russia, to Lisbon. |
| Teat's Hill | United Kingdom | The ship foundered in the Atlantic Ocean off Portreath, Cornwall. She was on a voyage from Newport, Monmouthshire, to Exeter, Devon. |
| Unanimity | United Kingdom | The ship was wrecked near "Naples". Her crew were rescued. She was on a voyage from Newfoundland to London. |

=== 10 December ===
List of shipwrecks: 11 December 1817
| Ship | State | Description |
|---|---|---|
| Felix Eugenio | Portugal | The ship was driven ashore near Pernambuco, Brazil. She was on a voyage from Lisbon to Pernambuco. Felix Eugenio was later refloated and taken in to Pernambuco. |
| Martin | United Kingdom | The ship was lost near the Rio de la Hacha, Viceroyalty of New Granada with the loss of five of her crew. She was on a voyage from Barcelona, Spain, to Santa Marta, Viceroyalty of New Granada. |

=== 11 December ===
List of shipwrecks: 11 December 1817
| Ship | State | Description |
|---|---|---|
| Ford | United Kingdom | The brig was driven ashore at the mouth of the River Ythan with the loss of two of her crew. |
| Joachim | Netherlands | The ship was driven ashore near Calais, France. She was on a voyage from Amsterdam, North Holland, to Bilbao, Spain. |
| Otto | Netherlands | The ship was driven ashore near Calais. She was on a voyage from Amsterdam to Havre de Grâce, Seine-Inférieure, France. |
| Prince of Wales | United Kingdom | The ship was abandoned in the Atlantic Ocean. Her crew were rescued by Juno (United Kingdom). Prince of Wales was on a voyage from Saint Thomas, Virgin Islands to London. |
| Triumfo | Portugal | The ship foundered in the Atlantic Ocean off Oporto. She was on a voyage from Martinique to Oporto. |

=== 12 December ===
List of shipwrecks: 12 December 1817
| Ship | State | Description |
|---|---|---|
| Diana | United Kingdom | The collier, a brig, was driven ashore and wrecked at Brighton, Sussex. |
| Johanna Elizabeth | Russia | The ship passed through the Øresund whilst on a voyage from Riga to Lisbon, Portugal. No further trace, presumed foundered with the loss of all hands. |
| Melville Castle | United Kingdom | The ship sprang a leak and was abandoned off "Vivrira", Spain. She was on a voyage from Belfast, County Antrim, to Gibraltar and Alicante, Spain |

=== 13 December ===
List of shipwrecks: 13 December 1817
| Ship | State | Description |
|---|---|---|
| Agnes and Elizabeth | United Kingdom | The sloop ran aground on Bridge-Ure Point. She was on a voyage from "Port Crawford" to Greenock, Renfrewshire. She was refloated the next day with assistance from HMRC Royal George ( Board of Customs) and taken in to Millport, Cumbrae, Ayrshire. |
| Brothers | United Kingdom | The ship was wrecked at Strangford, County Down. Her crew survived. She was on a voyage from Wexford to Glasgow, Renfrewshire. |
| Commodore | United Kingdom | The schooner was driven ashore in Mort Bay, Devon. She was later refloated. |
| Forth | United Kingdom | The ship was driven ashore and wrecked at Montrose, Forfarshire, with the loss of all twenty or 38 people on board. She was on a voyage from Aberdeen to Leith, Lothian. |
| Haabet | Norway | The ship was driven ashore near Bergen. She was on a voyage from Leith to Dram. |
| James Fitzpatrick | United Kingdom | The schooner was driven ashore near Castletown, Isle of Man. She was on a voyage from Trinidad to Cork. James Fitzpatrick was later refloated. |
| John | United Kingdom | The ship was wrecked at Strangford with the loss of three lives. She was on a voyage from Wexford to Glasgow. |
| Rebecca | United Kingdom | The ship was lost off "Doboy". She was on a voyage from Liverpool, Lancashire, to Darien, Georgia, United States. |

=== 14 December ===
List of shipwrecks: 14 December 1817
| Ship | State | Description |
|---|---|---|
| Forth Packet | United Kingdom | The ship was driven ashore near Montrose, Forfarshire, and capsized with the loss of all on board. She was on a voyage from Aberdeen to Leith, Lothian. |
| Gustav Adolf | Sweden | The ship was driven ashore at Great Yarmouth, Norfolk, United Kingdom. She was on a voyage from Stockholm to London, United Kingdom. |
| James | United Kingdom | The ship was wrecked in the Firth of Forth. All on board were rescued. She was on a voyage from Hull, Yorkshire, to Grangemouth, Stirlingshire. |
| Jeune Caroline | France | The ship was wrecked on the Glénan Islands. She was on a voyage from Newfoundland, British North America to Nantes, Loire-Inférieure. |
| Mary | United Kingdom | The brig was driven ashore and wrecked south of Collieston, Aberdeenshire, with the loss of five of her thirteen crew. |
| Vulcan | United Kingdom | The ship was wrecked at Darness, Orkney Islands. She was on a voyage from Saint Petersburg, Russia, to Dublin. |

=== 15 December ===
List of shipwrecks: 15 December 1817
| Ship | State | Description |
|---|---|---|
| HNLMS Amsterdam | Netherlands Navy | The 74-gun ship was beached at the Cape of Good Hope following gale damage with the loss of three of her crew. She was on a voyage from Batavia, Netherlands East Indies to Amsterdam, North Holland. HNLMS Amsterdam was subsequently wrecked on 19 December. |
| Bosch & Hoven | Netherlands | The ship was wrecked on the Haaks Sandbank, in the North Sea off the Dutch coast. She was on a voyage from Narva, Russia, to Amsterdam, North Holland. |
| Clementine | France | The ship was wrecked at Havana, Cuba. Her crew were rescued. |
| Concord | United Kingdom | The ship ran aground and was wrecked off Canso, Nova Scotia, British North America, with the loss of eight lives. |
| Elizabeth | United Kingdom | The ship was driven ashore and severely damaged at St. Ives, Cornwall with the loss of a crew member. She was later refloated and taken in to the River Hayle. |
| Hasley | United States | The ship was wrecked on the Haaks Sandbank. |
| Hope | United Kingdom | The ship was lost in the Gulf of Salerno. |
| Horan | Netherlands | The ship was wrecked on the Haaks Sandbank. She was on a voyage from Narva to Amsterdam. |
| Indian | British East India Company | The East Indiaman was driven ashore and wrecked on the Île de Batz, Finistère, France with the loss of 193 lives. |
| James & Mary | United Kingdom | The ship was driven ashore and severely damaged near Aberdeen with the loss of five of her crew. She was later refloated and taken in to Aberdeen. |
| Pleasant Hill | United Kingdom | The ketch was wrecked at Jersey, Channel Islands, with the loss of one of her six crew. Survivors were rescued by Minerva (United Kingdom). She was on a voyage from Seville, Spain, to London. Also reported as abandoned at sea and taken in to "Portieux", near "St Brieux", France, with her crew rescued by Queen (United Kingdom). |
| William | United Kingdom | The sloop foundered in the Atlantic Ocean off Portreath, Cornwall, with the loss of all hands. |

=== 16 December ===
List of shipwrecks: 16 December 1817
| Ship | State | Description |
|---|---|---|
| Anna Sophia | Netherlands | The ship foundered in the Grauwdiep. Her crew were rescued. |

=== 17 December ===
List of shipwrecks: 17 December 1817
| Ship | State | Description |
|---|---|---|
| Aiger | Norway | The ship driven ashore and wrecked on Düne. Her crew were rescued. She was on a voyage from Saint Petersburg, Russia, to Málaga, Spain. |
| Diana | United Kingdom | The ship capsized in the Clyde near Renfrew during a squall. |
| Jason | United Kingdom | The ship was driven ashore near Lamlash, Isle of Arran. She was on a voyage from Sligo to Glasgow, Renfrewshire. |
| John | United Kingdom | The ship was lost near Gallipoli, Ottoman Empire. She was on a voyage from Odesa, Russia, to Marseille, Bouches-du-Rhône, France. |
| La Manche | France | The ship was driven ashore and wrecked at Oxwich Point, Glamorgan, United Kigngdom with the loss of three of her crew. |
| Liberty | United Kingdom | The ship was driven ashore near St. Andero, Spain. Her crew were rescued. |
| Wohlfabet | Greifswald | The ship struck rocks off Bergen, Norway, and sank. Her crew were rescued. She was on a voyage from Amsterdam, North Holland, Netherlands to Greifswald. |
| Unnamed | United Kingdom | The fishing boat struck a rock in Water Sound, Orkney Islands and was lost with all hands. |

=== 18 December ===
List of shipwrecks: 18 December 1817
| Ship | State | Description |
|---|---|---|
| Alnwick Packet | United Kingdom | The ship was driven ashore at St. Margaret's Bay, Kent. She was on a voyage from Southampton, Hampshire, to Newcastle upon Tyne, Northumberland. |
| Hope | United Kingdom | The ship was wrecked at "Neding", Sweden. Her crew were rescued. She was on a voyage from Riga, Russia, to Leith, Lothian. |
| Jager | Lübeck | The ship was wrecked on Dragør, Denmark. She was on a voyage from Lübeck to São Miguel, Azores, Portugal. |
| Neptune | Netherlands | The ship was driven ashore near Berck-sur-Mer, Pas-de-Calais, France. She was on a voyage from Amsterdam, North Holland, to Cádiz, Spain. |
| Rachel & Mary | United Kingdom | The ship was driven ashore and wrecked near Berck-sur-Mer. She was on a voyage from Poole, Dorset, to London. |
| Triton | France | The ship was driven ashore and wrecked near Le Croisic, Loire-Inférieure with the loss of nine of her crew, She was on a voyage from Martinique to Nantes, Loire-Inférieure. |

=== 19 December ===
List of shipwrecks: 19 December 1817
| Ship | State | Description |
|---|---|---|
| Alnwick | United Kingdom | The packet ship was driven ashore in St. Margaret's Bay, Kent. She was on a voyage from Southampton, Hampshire to Newcastle upon Tyne, Northumberland. |
| Bilbaino | Spain | The ship foundered whilst on a voyage from A Coruña to St. Andero. Her crew were rescued. |
| Bridget | United Kingdom | The brig was wrecked near Killybegs, County Donegal, with the loss of all hands. |
| Brothers | United Kingdom | The coaster was driven ashore and wrecked at Killoch, Ayrshire. Her crew were rescued. |
| Corry | United Kingdom | The ship was driven ashore and wrecked at Southport, Lancashire, with the loss of eleven of her twenty crew. Survivors were rescued by the Lytham Lifeboat. Corry was on a voyage from Newry, County Down, to Liverpool, Lancashire. |
| Eliza Ann | United Kingdom | The ship was driven ashore at Liverpool. She was on a voyage from Saint John, New Brunswick, British North America, to Liverpool. |
| Gleaner | United Kingdom | The brig was driven ashore and wrecked at Aberdeen with the loss of all five crew. She was on a voyage from South Shields, County Durham, to Aberdeen. |
| Henry | United Kingdom | The brig was wrecked on the Herd Sand, in the North Sea off South Shields with the loss of four of her seven crew. She was on a voyage from South Shields to Arundel, Sussex. |
| Industrious Farmer | United Kingdom | The ship was driven ashore at Sunderland, County Durham. She was on a voyage from Whitby, Yorkshire, to Sunderland. |
| John | United Kingdom | The coaster was driven ashore and wrecked at Killoch with the loss of two of her crew. |
| Jong William | Netherlands | The ship was lost whilst on a voyage from Amsterdam, North Holland, to Bordeaux, Gironde, France. |
| London Packet | United Kingdom | The ship was driven ashore at Holyhead, Anglesey. She was on a voyage from Liverpool to Cádiz, Spain. London Packet was later refloated and taken in to Holyhead. |
| Mary | United Kingdom | The ship foundered off Montrose, Forfarshire. She was on a voyage from Gothenburg, Sweden, to the Firth of Forth. |
| Thames | United Kingdom | The ship was driven ashore on Scharhörn. All on board were rescued. She was on a voyage from London to Hamburg. |
| Unanimity | United Kingdom | The ship was wrecked at Naples, Kingdom of the Two Sicilies. |
| Windermere | United Kingdom | The ship was driven ashore at Liverpool. She was on a voyage from Bombay, India, to Liverpool. |

=== 20 December ===
List of shipwrecks: 20 December 1817
| Ship | State | Description |
|---|---|---|
| Althaes | Hamburg | The ship was driven ashore near Cley-next-the-Sea, Norfolk, United Kingdom. She was on a voyage from Hamburg to London, United Kingdom. |
| Fidelity | United Kingdom | The ship was driven ashore at Catfirth, Orkney Islands. She was on a voyage from Memel, Prussia to Aberdeen. Although refloated, she was deemed beyond repair. |
| Five Sisters | (United Kingdom of Great Britain and Ireland) British North America | The ship was wrecked at St. Anne's, Jamaica. Her crew were rescued. She was on a voyage from Saint John, New Brunswick, to Jamaica. |
| Rachel and Mary | United Kingdom | The ship was driven ashore and wrecked on the French coast between Boulogne, Pas-de-Calais and Saint-Valery-sur-Somme, Somme. |
| Robert | United Kingdom | The ship was wrecked at Sunderland, County Durham. Her crew were rescued. |

=== 21 December ===
List of shipwrecks: 21 December 1817
| Ship | State | Description |
|---|---|---|
| Forth | United Kingdom | The ship was wrecked on the Annet Sandbank, in the North Sea off Montrose, Forfarshire, with the loss of all on board, between 39 and 40 people. She was on a voyage from Aberdeen to Leith, Lothian. |
| Mary | United Kingdom | The brig was driven ashore and wrecked at Collieston, Aberdeenshire, with the loss of five of her thirteen crew. She was on a voyage from Gothenburg, Sweden, to Leith, Lothian. |

=== 22 December ===
List of shipwrecks: 22 December 1817
| Ship | State | Description |
|---|---|---|
| Elizabeth | United Kingdom | The brig was wrecked at St. Ives, Cornwall with the loss of a crew member. She was on a voyage from Cork to London. |

=== 23 December ===
List of shipwrecks: 23 December 1817
| Ship | State | Description |
|---|---|---|
| Isabella | United Kingdom | The ship was wrecked on the Seven Stones Reef, in the Atlantic Ocean off the Isles of Scilly. Her crew were rescued. She was on a voyage from King's Lynn, Norfolk, to Liverpool, Lancashire. |
| Silva | United Kingdom | The ship put in to Longhope, Orkney Islands in a waterlogged condition. She was on a voyage from Danzig to Hull, Yorkshire. |
| Tentamen | Hamburg | The ship was wrecked in the Abrolhos Archipelago, Brazil. Her crew were rescued. She was on a voyage from Hamburg to Rio de Janeiro, Brazil. |

=== 24 December ===
List of shipwrecks: 24 December 1817
| Ship | State | Description |
|---|---|---|
| Brothers | United Kingdom | The coaster was driven ashore and wrecked at Killoch, Ayrshire. Her crew were rescued. She was on a voyage from Wexford to the Clyde. |
| Charles | United Kingdom | The ship was wrecked on the Haisborough Sands, in the North Sea off the coast of Norfolk. All on board were rescued. She was on a voyage from Newcastle upon Tyne to London. |
| Diana | United Kingdom | The ship capsized in the Clyde at Greenock, Renfrewshire, during a squall. |
| Eliza | United Kingdom | The ship was wrecked on the Haisborough Sands. Her crew were rescued. She was on a voyage from Newcastle upon Tyne to London. |
| John | United Kingdom | The ship was driven ashore and wrecked at Killoch with the loss of two of her crew. |

=== 26 December ===
List of shipwrecks: 26 December 1817
| Ship | State | Description |
|---|---|---|
| Amelia | United Kingdom | The ship sprang a leak and was abandoned off St. Abb's Head, Berwickshire. She was on a voyage from Newcastle upon tyne, Northumberland, to Leith, Lothian. |
| Hibernia | United Kingdom | The ship was driven ashore on the Blythe Sand. She was on a voyage from London to Waterford. Hibernia was refloated on 7 January 1818 and taken in to Ramsgate, Kent. |
| Providence | United Kingdom | The ship was driven ashore at Ayr. She was on a voyage from Dublin to Glasgow. |

=== 27 December ===
List of shipwrecks: 27 December 1817
| Ship | State | Description |
|---|---|---|
| Action, or Active | United Kingdom | The ship was driven ashore and severely damaged at Sunderland, County Durham. She was on a voyage from Scarborough, Yorkshire, to Sunderland. She was refloated in January 1818. |
| Alpha | United Kingdom | The ship was wrecked at Southport, Lancashire with the loss of two of her crew. She was on a voyage from Liverpool, Lancashire to Poole, Dorset. |
| Ceneus | United Kingdom | The brig was driven ashore at Sunderland. She was refloated in January 1818. |
| Ceres | Netherlands | The ship was driven ashore and wrecked on Bonaire, Netherlands Antilles. She was on a voyage from Rotterdam, South Holland, to Curaçao. |
| Fergus | United Kingdom | The ship was driven ashore on "Amack Island", Denmark. She was on a voyage from Stettin to Kincardine. |
| Jane | United Kingdom | The ship was driven ashore and severely damaged at Sunderland. She was refloated in January 1818. |
| Stewart | United Kingdom | The ship capsized off Waterford. Her crew were rescued. She was on a voyage from Waterford to Glasgow, Renfrewshire. |

=== 28 December ===
List of shipwrecks: 28 December 1817
| Ship | State | Description |
|---|---|---|
| Feronia | United Kingdom | The ship was driven ashore in Studland Bay. She was on a voyage from Torquay, Devon, to London. |
| Friendship | United Kingdom | The ship was wrecked on the Goodwin Sands, Kent, with the loss of one of her six crew. She was on a voyage from Newcastle upon Tyne, Northumberland, to Lisbon, Portugal. |
| Haphazard | United Kingdom | The ship was driven ashore near Wells-next-the-Sea, Norfolk. She was on a voyage from Leeds, Yorkshire, to London. |

=== 31 December ===
List of shipwrecks: 31 December 1817
| Ship | State | Description |
|---|---|---|
| Clarendon | United Kingdom | The ship was driven ashore at the "Barton Gap". Her crew were rescued. She was on a voyage from "Borragaard" to London. |
| Lovely Mary | United Kingdom | The ship sprang a leak and was abandoned with the loss of a crew member. Survivors were rescued by Ayrshire (United Kingdom). |
| Ventrouven | Netherlands | The ship ran aground on the Holm Sand, in the Humber. She was on a voyage from Narva, Russia, to Amsterdam, North Holland. |

=== Unknown date ===
List of shipwrecks: Unknown date in December 1817
| Ship | State | Description |
|---|---|---|
| Agenoria | United Kingdom | The brig was run into by another vessel in the Atlantic Ocean and was wrecked previous to 9 December. The wreck was still afloat on 17 December. |
| Alexander | Danzig | The ship was driven ashore near "Negelen" before 9 December. She was on a voyage from Danzig to Memel, Prussia. |
| Anna Bruyen | Norway | The ship foundered in the North Sea. Her crew were rescued. She was on a voyage from Saint-Martin-de-Ré, Charente-Maritime, France to Christiansand. |
| Anna Sophia | Netherlands | The ship was driven ashore near "Semappen", Prussia. She was on a voyage from Amsterdam, North Holland, to Reval, Russia. |
| Apton | United Kingdom | The ship was wrecked on the coast of Ireland. She was on a voyage from London to Cork. A crew member was rescued by a Portuguese brig. |
| Barrosa | United Kingdom | The ship departed from Wisbech, Cambridgeshire, for the River Thames in late December. Presumed subsequently foundered in the North Sea off the coast of Norfolk with the loss of all hands. |
| Ben and Susan | United Kingdom | The ship foundered in the Atlantic Ocean off Viana do Castelo, Portugal, with the loss of all hands in mid-December. |
| Carnatic | United Kingdom | The ship caught fire at sea. She was on a voyage from Memel to Newcastle upon Tyne, Northumberland. She put in to Kalmar, Sweden on 7 December in a leaky condition. |
| Caroline | United Kingdom | The ship capsized on or before 23 December. She was on a voyage from Saint John, New Brunswick, British North America, to Aberdeen. Caroline was subsequently taken in to Stroma, Caithness. |
| Catharina & Agatha | United Kingdom of the Netherlands | The ship was lost off "Fahrsund". She was on a voyage from Amsterdam to Reval. |
| Charles | United Kingdom | The ship was lost off the Cordouan Lighthouse, Gironde, France. Her crew were rescued. She was on a voyage from London to Bordeaux, Gironde. |
| Columbine | United States | The ship was driven ashore near the mouth of the Courantyne River, Surinam. She was on a voyage from New London, Connecticut, to Berbice. She was later refloated and put into Demerara. |
| Dageraad | Netherlands | The ship was lost off Norderoog, Duchy of Schleswig with the loss of all but her captain. She was on a voyage from Drøbach, Norway to Groningen. |
| Dove | United Kingdom | The sloop was wrecked on the Lavan Sands with the loss of all on board. |
| Eliza | United Kingdom | The ship struck a rock and sank in the Isles of Scilly. she was on a voyage from London to Chepstow, Monmouthshire. |
| Endeavour | (United Kingdom of Great Britain and Ireland) New South Wales | The schooner was driven ashore and wrecked at Nobbys Head. Her crew survived. |
| Expedition | United Kingdom | The sloop was driven ashore near Swansea, Glamorgan. She was later refloated and taken in to Swansea. |
| Fame | United Kingdom | The ship was driven ashore and wrecked on the Île de Batz, Finistère, France. |
| Flora | Prussia | The ship was driven ashore on Saltholm, Denmark. She was on a voyage from Memel to London. Flora was later refloated and arrived at Helsingør on 31 December. |
| Fortuna | Flag unknown | The ship foundered off the mouth of the Eider. Her crew were rescued. She was on a voyage from Lübeck to Bremen. |
| Fredrich | Prussia | The ship was driven ashore near Pillau. She was on a voyage from Königsberg to Amsterdam. |
| Furst Hardenburg | Stettin | The ship was driven ashore and damaged between Møn, Denmark and Stawen, Swedish Pomerania. She was refloated and put into Præstø, Denmark and then sailed to Copenhagen for repairs. Furst Hardenburg was on a voyage from Stettin to Bordeaux. |
| Gute Erwarting | Hamburg | The ship was lost off "Steilsand". She was on a voyage from "Fedunan" to Hamburg. |
| Hoop | Netherlands | The ship was lost in early December near Roscoff, Finistère, France. She was on a voyage from Amsterdam, North Holland, to Genoa, Kingdom of Sardinia. |
| Hunter | United Kingdom | The ship was driven ashore in the Rock Gut. She was on a voyage from Calcutta, India to Liverpool, Lancashire. She had been refloated by 16 December. |
| Indiana | Netherlands | The ship was lost near "Fridrichwaren". She was on a voyage from Amsterdam to Tonningen, Duchy of Holstein. |
| Iroquois | United Kingdom | The ship capsized in the North Sea. She was on a voyage from Gothenburg, Sweden to Leith, Lothian. She was righted and put in to Whitby, Yorkshire, where she arrived on 27 December. |
| Jane | United Kingdom | The ship was driven ashore and wrecked on the Isle of Man. Her crew were rescued. She was on a voyage from Dublin to the Clyde. |
| Jane | United Kingdom | The ship sprang a leak and was abandoned in the Atlantic Ocean. Her crew were rescued by True Blue (United Kingdom). Jane was on a voyage from St. Andrew, New Brunswick, British North America, to Workington, Cumberland. |
| La Petite Julie | France | The ship foundered in the English Channel off Saint-Valery-sur-Somme, Somme. She was on a voyage from Caen, Calvados to London. |
| Louis | France | The ship was driven ashore at Arcachon, Gironde. She was on a voyage from New Orleans, Louisiana, to Bordeaux. |
| Neptunus | Denmark | The ship was wrecked near Ystad, Sweden. She was on a voyage from Copenhagen to Loviisa, Grand Duchy of Finland. |
| Olivia | France | The ship foundered in the Baltic Sea off Libava, Courland Governorate. Her crew were rescued. |
| Pleasant Hill | United Kingdom | The ship was dismasted and then abandoned by her crew, who were rescued by Queen (United Kingdom). Pleasant Hill was presumed to have subsequently foundered. She was on a voyage from Seville, Spain, to London. |
| Rebecca | United States | The ship was driven ashore at L'Aiguillon-sur-Mer, Vendée, France. She was on a voyage from New Orleans, Louisiana, to Bordeaux, Gironde, France. |
| Severn | United Kingdom | The ship foundered in the English Channel off Brighton, Sussex. |
| St. Ola | United Kingdom | The ship capsized off the Orkney Islands on or before 13 December. She was taken in to Widewall, Orkney. |
| Superb | United States | The ship capsized in the Atlantic Ocean (37°40′N 50°00′W). Her crew were rescued on 27 December by Cambrian (United Kingdom). Superb was on a voyage from Salem, Massachusetts, to Martinique. |
| Syren | United Kingdom | The ship was driven ashore in the Cattewater. She was on a voyage from London to Jamaica. She was refloated and found to be severely leaky. |
| Thomas Martin | United Kingdom | The ship foundered in the Bay of Fundy. Her crew were rescued. She was on a voyage from Glasgow, Renfrewshire, to New Brunswick, British North America. |
| Treton | United States | The ship ran aground in the Elbe. She was on a voyage from Hamburg to New York. She was refloated and taken in to Cuxhaven in a leaky condition. |
| Two Gebruder | Hamburg | The ship was lost off the Sudpiep. She was on a voyage from Rendsburg, Duchy of Schleswig to Altona, Hamburg. |
| Wilhelmina | Norway | The ship foundered whilst on a voyage from Saint-Martin-de-Ré, Charente-Maritime, France to Stavanger. |
| William | United Kingdom | The ship was wrecked near Pictou, Nova Scotia, British North America. |
| Workington | United States | The ship was wrecked on North Caicos. Her crew were rescued. She was on a voyage from Snow Hill to Veracruz. |

== Unknown date ==
List of shipwrecks: Unknown date in 1817
| Ship | State | Description |
|---|---|---|
| Adeline | United States | The ship was wrecked in the Abaco Islands. Her crew were rescued. She was on a voyage from Savannah, Georgia, to Havana, Cuba. |
| Aisthorpe | United Kingdom | The ship was driven ashore at Darien, Georgia, United States. She was on a voyage from Darien tob Liverpool, Lancashire. |
| Alonette | France | The ship was lost off Cape Point, Africa, with the loss of a crew member. |
| Amethyst | United Kingdom | The ship was driven ashore at Alexandria, Egypt. |
| Angelica | United Kingdom | The ship foundered in the Indian Ocean whilst on a voyage from the Cape of Good Hope to Mauritius with the loss of all hands. |
| Anna | United Kingdom | The ship was lost at sea in 1816. or 1817. |
| Arabella | United States | The ship was lost near St. Thomas, Virgin Islands. She was on a voyage from Pará, Brazil to New York. |
| Aristides | United States | The ship was lost whilst on a voyage from New Orleans, Louisiana, to New York. |
| Camillus | United Kingdom | The ship was lost in the Saint Lawrence River. She was on a voyage from Quebec City, Lower Canada, British North America, to London. |
| Ceres | United Kingdom | The ship was destroyed by fire at Quebec City. |
| Correio d'Asia | Portugal | The ship was wrecked off Cloates Island, New Holland. Thirty-two of her 34 crew were rescued by Caledonia (United Kingdom). The other two crew members went missing on Cloates Island. |
| Dauntless or Dundee | United Kingdom | The whaler was lost off Greenland prior to 5 July. Her crew were rescued. |
| Diana | United Kingdom | The ship struck a rock and sank off Malacca with the loss of three of her crew. She was on a voyage from China to Bengal, India. |
| Dispatch | United Kingdom | The ship was driven ashore at Boston, Massachusetts, United States. |
| Elphinstone | British East India Company | The East Indiaman was destroyed by fire at Whampoa, China. |
| Elsinore | United Kingdom | The ship was wrecked on the south coast of Cuba. Her crew were rescued. She was on a voyage from the Turks Islands to Havana. |
| Europa | United Kingdom | The ship foundered off Cape Breton Island, British North America. She was on a voyage from Miramichi Bay to Ayr. |
| Europe | United Kingdom | The ship was driven ashore. She was on a voyage from Madras, India to Batavia, Netherlands East Indies. She was refloated and taken in to Calcutta, India for repairs. |
| Fame | United Kingdom | A highly credible source reports that the ship wrecked in the Torres Strait about the middle of 1817, probably in May, although Lloyd's Register and the Register of Shipping – using contradictory and probably stale information – continued to carry her as active well into the 1820s. |
| Fanny | United Kingdom | The ship was destroyed by fire off "Cape Tiberoon" (Cape Tiburon). All on board were rescued. She was on a voyage from London to Jamaica. |
| Francisca | Spain | The ship was lost whilst outbound from Bilbao. |
| General Jackson | United States | The ship was wrecked on the coast of Maryland. Her crew were rescued. She was on a voyage from Providence, Rhode Island, to the West Indies. |
| General Pike | United States | The ship was abandoned at sea. She was on a voyage from Philadelphia, Pennsylvania, to Mobile, Alabama Territory. |
| Harriet | United Kingdom | The ship foundered whilst on a voyage from the West Indies to the United States. |
| Heroine | United Kingdom | The ship foundered in the Atlantic Ocean. Her crew were rescued by Maria (United Kingdom). Heroine was on a voyage from Grenada to London. |
| Hope | (United Kingdom of Great Britain and Ireland) New South Wales | The ship was wrecked at Port Stephens. |
| Hunter | United Kingdom | The ship was lost whilst on a voyage from Wilmington, Delaware, United States, to Bristol, Gloucestershire. |
| Johns | United Kingdom | The ship foundered whilst on a voyage from the Clyde to Smyrna, Greece via Gibraltar and Malta. |
| Jonge Antonie | Netherlands | The galiot was wrecked at The Lizard, Cornwall, United Kingdom. |
| Latona | United Kingdom | The full-rigged ship was sunk by ice in the Gulf of St. Lawrence. Her crew were rescued. |
| Liberty | United Kingdom | The brig foundered off Milford Haven, Pembrokeshire some time before 12 August. She was on a voyage from Dublin to Milford Haven. |
| Lion | United Kingdom | The whaler was lost off the coast of Greenland prior to 5 July. Her crew were rescued. |
| Mary | Flag unknown | The ship was wrecked on Anegada, Virgin Islands. She was on a voyage from Jamaica to Veracruz, Mexico. |
| Mary & Jane | United Kingdom | The ship was sunk by ice in the Gulf of St. Lawrence. Her crew were rescued. She was on a voyage from Jamaica to Quebec City. |
| Mary Cawson | United States | The ship foundered whilst on a voyage from New Orleans to Nassau, Bahamas. Her crew were rescued. |
| Moston | United Kingdom | The ship was driven ashore 15 nautical miles (28 km) west of Demerara. She was on a voyage from St. Andrew's, New Brunswick, British North America to Demerara. She was later refloated and completed her voyage, arriving on 6 April. |
| Neptune | United Kingdom | The ship was lost in the St. Lawrence River. Her crew were rescued. She was on a voyage from Greenock, Renfrewshire, to Quebec City. |
| Nostra Señora Buenanzezo | Spain | The polacre was abandoned in the Atlantic Ocean. She was subsequently taken in to Yarmouth, Nova Scotia, British North America. |
| Paquete Legeira | Portugal | The ship was lost off Maranhão, Brazil. Her crew were rescued. She was on a voyage from Lisbon to Maranho. |
| Pilot | United States | The ship was abandoned in the Atlantic Ocean. Her crew were rescued by Edward (United States). |
| Providence Increase | United Kingdom | The ship was lost in the Gulf of Taranto. She was on a voyage from Messina, Sicily to Trieste. |
| Sarah | United Kingdom | The ship was wrecked on the coast of Newfoundland, British North America. She was on a voyage from Dartmouth, Devon, to Newfoundland. |
| Squid | United Kingdom | The schooner was wrecked near St. John's, Newfoundland, British North America. |
| Superb | United States | The ship foundered whilst on a voyage from New Orleans to New York. Her crew were rescued. |
| Topaze | United States | The ship sprang a leak and was abandoned by her crew. She was on a voyage from Providence, Rhode Island, to Havana. |
| Ulysses | United States | The ship was lost whilst on a voyage from Jamaica to New Orleans. |
| Vittoria | Flag unknown | The ship ran aground in the Saint Lawrence River. |
| Two unnamed vessels | United Kingdom | The whalers, one of them a brig, were lost off Greenland before 5 July. Their crew were rescued. |
| Unnamed | (Spain) Viceroyalty of New Granada | The privateer, a brig, was wrecked at Cape Florida, East Florida. Her crew were rescued. |
