= List of shipwrecks of Tasmania =

Shipwrecks of Tasmania are shipwrecks which have occurred in and around the island state of Tasmania, Australia.

== Geographical and historical background ==
Tasmania is an island and since the time of European colonisation by the British, the population had been entirely reliant upon the sea for all physical contact with the outside world, until the development of links by air.

Since European discovery in 1642 by the Dutch navigator Abel Tasman, many explorers and many vessels visited Tasmania, or Tasmania's waters. Following the establishment of a British settlement in 1803 at Hobart, a local boatbuilding industry began almost immediately. Since that time Tasmania has had a very strong connection to the sea, and both commercial and recreational sailing has been a constant feature of Tasmania's history.

Tasmania's geographical position latitude 42° south, longitude 147° east, is along the line of latitude that places it in the path of the powerful winds known as the roaring forties, a band of westerly winds which blow across the Southern Ocean. Mariners of the 18th and 19th centuries utilised these winds to shorten the time it took them to reach Australia after rounding the Cape of Good Hope on their way from Europe. However, these same winds also led to the destruction of many vessels in raging seas and fierce storms. Over 1,000 vessels are thought to have been wrecked in Tasmanian waters, including the eighth oldest known wreck in Australia, the ship Sydney Cove.

The Tasmanian coastline also posed several risks for mariners in the Age of Sail. It is regularly interspersed with jagged cliffs and submerged off-shore rocks. Also many of the inlets and bays which do provide shelter have dangerous entrances. The weather which affects Tasmania has also contributed to many wrecks. Tasmania can be susceptible to violent storms, such as the one which sank five boats competing in the 1998 Sydney to Hobart Yacht Race.

Many of the wrecks in Tasmanian waters have claimed lives, and the waters surrounding the island remain a watery grave for them. This list includes many vessels marked (X) that were lost with all hands in the so-called Bass Strait Triangle.

== List of known Tasmanian wrecks accompanied by loss of life, and others ==
- 1797: Sydney Cove, full-rigged ship, beached at Preservation Island after springing a leak at sea, no lives lost in the immediate wreck, but many in subsequent boat voyage to Sydney or on the island as castaways.
- 1804: Hebe (1803 ship), a 250-ton full-rigged ship, launched at Chittagong that ran onto reef approaching the entrance of the Tamar River; one life lost.
- 1812: Campbell Macquarie, a 248-ton full-rigged ship captained by Richard Siddins shipwrecked in Hasselborough Bay in Tasmania on 11 June 1812 with at least four lives lost as castaways.
- 1814: Argo, a 4-gun barque, was stolen by convict bolters who took it to sea, to be never heard from again; 13 or 14 presumed lost.
- 1822: Actaeon full-rigged ship hit reef in D'Entrecasteaux Channel, no lives lost off ship, but one salvage boat capsized, 2 lives lost.
- 1826: Sally, a schooner wrecked near Cape Portland, 13 lives lost.
- 1827: Dotterel, brig, wrecked near Tamar Heads, one crewman drowned.
- 1833: Portland, full-rigged ship, wrecked east of Tamar Heads, 2 lives lost.
- 1834: Jane, schooner, St. Helens Bar, East Coast, three or four lives lost.
- 1835: George III, convict transport, wrecked on rocks off Southport. 133 lives lost.
- 1835: Neva, convict transport, wrecked off King Island, 225 lives lost.
- 1835: Enchantress, a barque, hit rocks and sank off south-west coast of Bruny Island, seventeen lives lost.
- 1836: Louisa, schooner, sank off Bruny Island, several lives lost.
- 1837: Mars, schooner, foundered in Storm Bay, four lives lost.
- 1838: Lady Franklin, schooner, missing in Bass Strait, about 20 lives lost.(?X)
- 1838: Port Phillip Packet, missing in Bass Strait, 6 lives lost. (X)
- 1838: Yarra Yarra, schooner, missing in Bass Strait, about 25 lives lost. (X)
- 1839: Agnes, schooner, foundered in Bass Strait, all hands (about 6) lives lost. (X)
- 1839: Britomart, barque, foundered in the Furneaux Group, all hands (about 30) lost. (X)
- 1840: Echo, schooner, wrecked in gale off the west coast of Tasman Peninsula, all hands (about 8) lost.
- 1841: Humber, schooner, missing between Port Arthur, Tasmania and Hobart, all hands (about 6) lost.
- 1842: Edward, schooner, Missing between Circular Head and Launceston, Tasmania, all hands (about 15) lost. (X)
- 1843: Charlotte, cutter, wrecked at Falmouth, 2 lives lost.
- 1843: Rebecca barque, grounded on King Island, 5 lives lost. Salvaged & wrecked again in 1853.
- 1845: Cataraqui, full-rigged ship, wrecked on King Island, 400 lives lost.
- 1845: Mary, barque, hit rocks and broke up north-west of Flinders Island, 17 lives lost.
- 1846: Maria Orr, barque, whaler wrecked at Recherche Bay, one life lost.
- 1848: John Pirie, schooner, wrecked off the Furneaux Group in Bass Strait, all hands (about 10) lost. (X)
- 1848: Governor Phillip, Government brig, on Gull island in Bass Strait, 16 lives lost.
- 1848: Harriett, schooner, missing in Bass Strait, all hands (about 7) lost. (X)
- 1850: Lady Denison, barque, foundered off far north-west coast, all hands (40) lost. (X)
- 1850: Albert, schooner, foundered in Bass Strait, all hands (about 6) lost. (X)
- 1850: Resolution, cutter, wrecked off Bicheno, six lives lost.
- 1851: Fairy, schooner, sank off Tamar Heads, three loves lost.
- 1852: Zephyr, schooner, wrecked near Bream Creak, eight lives lost.
- 1853: Antares, schooner, wrecked in the Furneaux Group, eight lives lost.
- 1853: Rebecca, barque, on the west coast near Arthur River, eight lives lost.
- 1854: Lioness, schooner, at Clarke Island on the Furneaux Group, four lives lost.
- 1854: Brahmin, full-rigged ship, off King Island, 16 lives lost.
- 1854: Dolphin, cutter, wrecked in Louisa Bay, 11 lives lost.
- 1855: Whistler, American full-rigged ship, on the northern end of King Island, two lives lost.
- 1855: Maypo, brig, on the northern end of King Island, four lives lost.
- 1857: Viola, brig, on Friendlies Beach, no lives lost.
- 1858: Blanch, cutter, last seen of Tasmania's east coast before disappearing at sea, 5 crew presumed lost.
- 1861: Tyne, schooner, near Cape Pillar, four lives lost.
- 1862: Reindeer, schooner, foundered in Bass Strait, all hands (about 10) lost. (X)
- 1863: Red Jacket, schooner, missing in Bass Strait, about 8 lives lost. (X)
- 1863: Creole, brig, foundered off Swan Island, 29 lives lost. Dead and wreckage illegally plundered. (X)
- 1863: Grecian Queen, 378 ton brig, missing in Bass Strait, wreckage found at Swan Island, all hands lost (unknown, about 10). (X)
- 1864: Sea Breeze, barque, at Circular Head (Stanley), one life lost.
- 1865: Glimpse, cutter, on a voyage from Wynyard to Launceston, lost with all hands (including 5 passengers). (X)
- 1873: City of Hobart, fishing boat, lost between Hobart and Blackmans Bay, 1 life lost.
- 1874: British Admiral steamer, wrecked on reef off King Island 79 lives lost
- 1874: Albion, ketch, disappeared off north-west coast, 2 lives presumed lost. (X)
- 1874: Eclipse, schooner, near Hobart, 2 lives lost.
- 1875: Comet was a barque lost between New Zealand and Hobart; 13 lives lost.
- 1883: Beryl cutter, capsized off Tamar Heads, 2 lives lost.
- 1884: Farningham Composite barque, collided with iron barque Vanguard, and the order was given to abandon ship. Crew was transferred to Vanguard but three were trapped in forecastle; 3 lives lost.
- 1898: Annie Ward, ketch sank in storm off South Arm, 3 lives lost.
- 1898: SS Grafton sank at Macquarie Head, west coast
- 1903: Chris, fishing boat, unregistered, lost between Hobart and Adventure Bay, 3 lives lost.
- 1904: Acacia, cargo barque, broke up without trace after hitting "Acacia Rocks", West Coast north of Port Davey, 9 lives lost.
- 1904: Brier Holme, barque, sank off southwest Tasmania after striking a reef and having cargo of dynamite explode on board, 17 lives lost.
- 1907: Alfhild, iron barque, smashed against cliffs in wild seas off Port Davey, 4 lives lost, 13 men made it to boats, but 7 were lost at sea, presumed dead.
- 1908: Orion, steamship, foundered in Bass Strait, all hands (27) lost. (X)
- 1909: Kawatiri, steamship, wrecked after hitting breakwater at Macquarie Harbour Heads, six lives lost.
- 1920: Southern Cross, schooner, caught fire and sank in Bass Strait, all hands (9) lost. (X)
- 1920: Amelia J., schooner, lost at sea in Bass Strait crew of 12 presumed lost. A biplane used in the search was also lost without trace off the Furneaux Group. (?X)
- 1925: Clyde, fishing boat, sank in huge seas off Recherche Bay, 3 lives lost.
- 1958: Willwatch Auxiliary ketch, 96/64 tons. # 101141. Built Blackwall, Brisbane Water, NSW, 1895; reg. Melbourne 5/1947. Lbd 84 ft × 21.5 ft × 7.3 ft. Master George McCarthy. From Ulverstone for King Island with general cargo, lost in a gale off the far north-west coast Tasmania, between the Hunter Group and King Island, 17 December 1958. Despite radio distress messages that allowed would-be rescuers to follow the vessel's death-throws in graphic detail for nearly two hours, the appalling weather conditions then prevailing prevented any effective rescue operations. Crew of five lost. Only the large trawlers Olympic and V.S.P. working off King Island were in a position to head for the stricken vessel. By the time they arrived the Will Watch had been sunk for at least an hour, and despite extensive air and sea searches extending over several days, no trace of the missing men was ever found.
- 1959: Blythe Star, 138-ton cargo ship, engine room exploded and ensuing fire burned her to the water, before she sank. Explosion killed engineer instantly, 10 crew survived.
- 1961: Flying Scud, fishing boat, entangled in heavy kelp off Fluted Cape and smashed onto the rocks in the swell. 1 life lost.
- 1962: Gondwana, fishing ketch, foundered off Maatsuyker Island, 2 lives lost.
- 1973: Blythe Star (2), 144-ton cargo ship, just 14 years after her predecessor sank, the second Blythe Star became overdue after leaving Hobart for King Island, and despite the most extensive air search ever conducted in Australia at the time, the vessel could not be located. Seven of the 10 crew were found 11 days later on the Tasman Peninsula, having escaped to the liferaft when she suddenly capsized and sank off South West Cape, Tasmania. One man died on the raft and two on land. The boat was located by a CSIRO research team nearly 50 years later, in April 2023, with just one survivor still alive at the time.
- 1975: Bunyip, sloop-rigged yacht, swamped in Bass Strait, 1 life lost.
- 1975: Lake Illawarra, bulk carrier, sunk in the River Derwent, after colliding with the Tasman Bridge, 12 lives lost.
- 1979: Charleston (Yacht) disappeared in Bass Strait, 5 lives lost.
- 1990: Great Expectations, sloop, returning to Melbourne following a successful completion of the Melbourne to Devonport Yacht Race, she disappeared somewhere in the vicinity of Cape Portland without trace. It was believed she was swamped by a giant wave. Personal effects were all that was recovered. 6 lives lost. (X)
- 1997: Eastern Star, fishing boat, swamped by freak 15 metre wave whilst at anchor, in mouth of Pieman River, 3 lives lost and never recovered.
- 1997: Helen J., fishing boat, broke up in heavy weather off the Pieman River, 2 lives lost.

== Some significant wrecks without loss of life ==
- 1848: Abeona, whaler, broke up New Harbour.
- 1853: Litherland, square rig whaler, hit rocks off Clarke Island.
- 1854: Alert, schooner ran aground at Arthur River in violent storm. Remains of vessel exposed by storm 2005.
- 1860: Annott Lyle, brigantine, drifted onto rocks, Swan Island.
- 1862: George Marshall, Flinders Island.
- 1866: Netherby, King Island. 504 persons on board saved.
- 1877: Bulli, collier steamship, struck rocks off Erith Island, Bass Strait.
- 1877: City of Hobart, collier steamship sank off Wilsons Promontory.
- 1883: Tasman, steamer, struck Hippolyte Rocks off the Tasman Peninsula and sank. Wreck rediscovered about 2004.
- 1883: Asterope, 500 ton barque, ran onto Hebe Reef, before sinking at Tamar Heads.
- 1890: Carlisle, iron barque, hit rocks off Wilson's Promontory but in Tasmanian waters, and sank quickly, no lives lost. Wreck identified 2018.
- 1891: Circe, brigantine, wrecked upon a sand bar at Macquarie Harbour.
- 1898: Annie McDougall, schooner, and Grafton, Steamer, both struck the same north spit of Hell's Gates within two months of each other, no lives lost on either vessel.
- 1907: Derwent Hunter, hulk, formerly a whaling barque, alongside laid-up steamship Beautiful Star, both destroyed in fire at Hobart slipyards.
- 1914: Svenor, iron barque, abandoned at sea after being dismasted, went ashore at Wreck Bay on the west coast, remains still visible.
- 1915: Nord, cargo steamer, struck Hippolyte Rocks off the Tasman Peninsula. A popular dive wreck.
- 1929: TSS Kanowna, steamer, one of Tasmania's largest shipwrecks, found in 2005 in Bass Strait.
- 1937: Otago, hulk, formerly iron barque, beached in the River Derwent at the end of her useful career.
- 1980: Aqua Enterprise, Trawler, began taking on water before sinking 100 km south of Hobart.

== Legends ==
The George III convict ship wreck is one example of a story which changed completely due to verbal history.

== See also ==
- List of shipwrecks of Australia
