= Thumb (disambiguation) =

The thumb is the first digit of the human hand.

Thumb or Thumbs may also refer to:

== Computing ==
- ARM Thumb, an instruction encoding and corresponding execution mode for the ARM architecture
- Thumb, shorthand for thumbnail, a reduced version of an image
  - Thumbs.db, the Windows thumbnail cache file created in File Explorer

== Entertainment ==
- Thumb (band), a German rapcore band
- "Thumb", a song by Dinosaur Jr. from the album Green Mind (1991)
- "Thumb, a song by Kyuss album from the Blues for the Red Sun (1992)
- "Thumb", a song by M Huncho from the album Huncholini the 1st (2020)
- Thumbs (mixtape), a 2015 mixtape by Busdriver
- "Thumbs", a song by Sabrina Carpenter from Evolution (2016)
- Thumbs!, a series of film parodies
- The Thumbs, an American punk rock band

== Places ==
=== Canada ===
- The Thumb (mountain), a mountain in the Lower Mainland of British Columbia
- The Thumb (Omineca), a mountain in the Omineca Country of British Columbia

=== United States ===
- The Thumb (California), a mountain in the Sierra Nevada of California
- The Thumb, a region in Michigan
- Thumb Lake, a.k.a. Lake Louise in Hudson Township, Charlevoix County, Michigan
- Thumb Mountain, in New Hampshire

=== Elsewhere ===
- The Thumbs (New Zealand), a mountain in Canterbury Region, New Zealand
- Thumb Peak (Palawan), a small mountain in central Palawan, Philippines
- The Thumbs (Tasmania), Tasmanian islet, Australia

== People ==
- General Tom Thumb (1838–1883), stage name of Charles Sherwood Stratton, a dwarf who achieved great fame
  - Tom Thumb (disambiguation)
- Peter Thumb (1681–1767), Austrian architect whose family came from the Vorarlberg

== Other uses ==
- Thumb (backhoe), a thumb-like metal bar hinged to a backhoe's scoop

== See also ==
- THUMS Islands
- Thumb Bandits, video game TV show
- Thumb Candy, video game TV show
- Hop-o'-My-Thumb, a folk tale
- Rule of thumb, an informal rule
- Thumb signal, a hand gesture
- Devils Thumb, a mountain between Alaska and British Columbia
