= Tom Thumb (disambiguation) =

Tom Thumb is a diminutive hero of English folklore.

Tom Thumb may also refer to:

== Arts and entertainment ==
- Tom Thumb (comics), the codename of two Marvel Comics superheroes
- Tom Thumb (film), a 1958 feature film directed by George Pal
- Tom Thumb (play), a 1730 play by Henry Fielding
- The Secret Adventures of Tom Thumb, a 1993 stop-motion animated film
- Tom Thumb, a character in the children's book The Tale of Two Bad Mice by Beatrix Potter
- Tom Thumb, a 1934 Krazy Kat film
- "Tom Thumb", a song by American jazz pianist Bobby Timmons from the 1966 album The Soul Man!
- Tom of T.H.U.M.B., a 1966 television animated series produced by Videocraft International, with animation produced by Toei Animation.

== People ==
- General Tom Thumb (1838–1883), American circus performer
- Manuel Ramos (boxer) (1942–1999), nicknamed Pulgarcito (Tom Thumb), Mexican boxer

== Businesses ==
- Tom Thumb (grocery store), an American supermarket chain in Texas
- Tom Thumb Food Stores, an American convenience store chain in Florida and Alabama
- Tom Thumb Gallery, an alternative exhibition space in Kirksville, Missouri

== Other uses ==
- Tom Thumb (locomotive), the first American-built steam locomotive, built in 1830
- Tom Thumb, an open boat used by navigator Matthew Flinders and George Bass in 1796
- Tom Thumb Peak, in the Howson Range, British Columbia, Canada
- Tom Thumb snaffle, a type of bit mouthpiece for horses

== See also ==
- "Just Like Tom Thumb's Blues", a song by Bob Dylan
- "Tom Thumb Tempest", an episode of the 1960s British TV series Stingray
- Tom Thumb House (disambiguation)
- Thumbelina (disambiguation)
