= Tasmanian Seafarers' Memorial =

Memorial in Triabunna, Tasmania, Australia

The Tasmanian Seafarers' Memorial is a public memorial structure located at Triabunna, Tasmania which jointly commemorates all Tasmanians who died at sea, along with the lives of all seafarers of any origin who lost their lives in Tasmanian waters. The memorial comprises individual commemorative plaques for each maritime tragedy involving recreational, commercial, mercantile or naval vessels and personnel lost since 1803. As of February 2017, the memorial contained plaques for 116 events involving the loss of over 1450 lives.

The Seafarers' Memorial at Triabunna is an acknowledged Australian maritime memorial site, and has become a popular visiting and reflection place for many tourists travelling on Tasmania's eastern coast.

== History ==
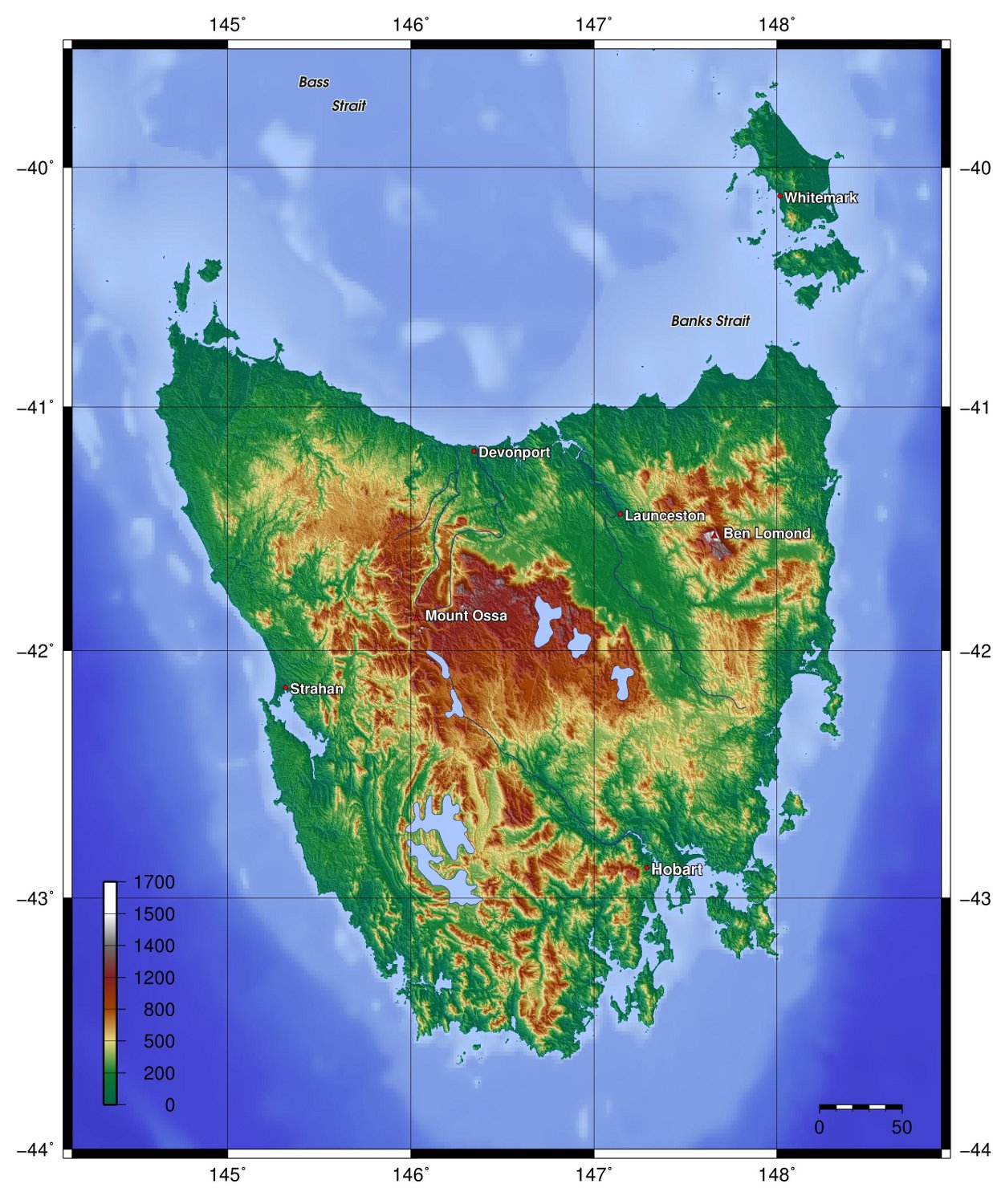
Island of Tasmania, located below the Australian mainland between latitudes 40°S and 44°S

Located to the south of the Australian mainland and fully exposed to the Roaring Forties winds of the Southern Hemisphere, the island state of Tasmania has a long history of seafaring, and an even longer history of seaborne tragedy. Ships have foundered off Tasmania's 2,500 kilometres (1,600 mi) of coastline even before permanent settlement began in 1803, and over 1000 vessels are known to have been lost in Tasmanian waters since records began. In addition, Tasmanians have served or sailed on vessels across the globe since those same times, both in peacetime and in war, and many have perished in seafaring tragedies, often never being recovered. It is to all these vessels and seafarers that the Tasmanian Seafarers' Memorial is dedicated.

The stated purposes of the Memorial are:

- to provide a location to place commemorative plaques in memory of loved ones lost at sea;
- to provide a place to focus grief for those lost seafarers whose bodies were never found, or whose remains were buried at sea;
- to increase water safety awareness; and
- to establish a source of Tasmanian maritime history.

The Memorial has its origins with the loss of a young fisherman of Triabunna, Gavin Batchelor, who drowned off Maria Island in 1995. Representations were made to the local Glamorgan Spring Bay Council, who in 1996 established a permanent Tasmanian Seafarers' Memorial Committee to oversee the construction and ongoing management of a memorial suitable to be dedicated to all Tasmanian seafarers. Financial support has been from local, state and federal levels of government as well as individual donations.

The official dedication of the Memorial occurred on Sunday 26 October 1997, which was conducted by the Mayor of Glamorgan Spring Bay Council, Cr E. A. (Bill) Bailey, and addressed by members of the Australian and Tasmanian governments, through Senator Eric Abetz and the Hon. Denise Swan respectively. The formal dedication quoted at the initial and all subsequent ceremonies at the Memorial is:

"The memory of those whom we have lost – We share. For those who grieve such a loss – We care."

== Notable tragedies commemorated ==
Among the over 100 maritime tragedies commemorated by plaques at the Tasmanian Seafarers' Memorial are many which represent events well-known to most Tasmanians and many mainland Australians. These notable tragedies include:

- The losses of the convict ships George III and Neva in 1835, and the emigrant ship Cataraqui in 1845, in Tasmanian waters during the earliest days of the colony, with a total loss of over 750 men, women and children.
- The loss of Australia's first submarine, HMAS AE1, off Papua New Guinea in 1914 and still unexplained. 34 seamen were lost and never recovered, including the first Tasmanian to be killed in service during World War I.
- The sinking of the destroyer HMAS Voyager off Jervis Bay in 1964 following a night-time collision with the carrier HMAS Melbourne. Four Tasmanian sailors were among the 81 naval personnel lost when the Voyager went down after being cut in two.
- The Tasman Bridge disaster of 1975, when the 10,000T bulk-carrier Lake Illawarra collided with the Tasman Bridge at night on the Derwent River at Hobart and collapsed two concrete bridge spans. Twelve lives, including those of five motorists whose vehicles plunged off the roadway into the river, were lost that night.
- The running of the 1998 Sydney to Hobart Yacht Race, when the world-famous annual event ran into an exceptionally violent Tasman Sea weather event just to the north of Tasmania, resulting in the destruction of five racing yachts and the loss of six lives.
Notable tragedies commemorated

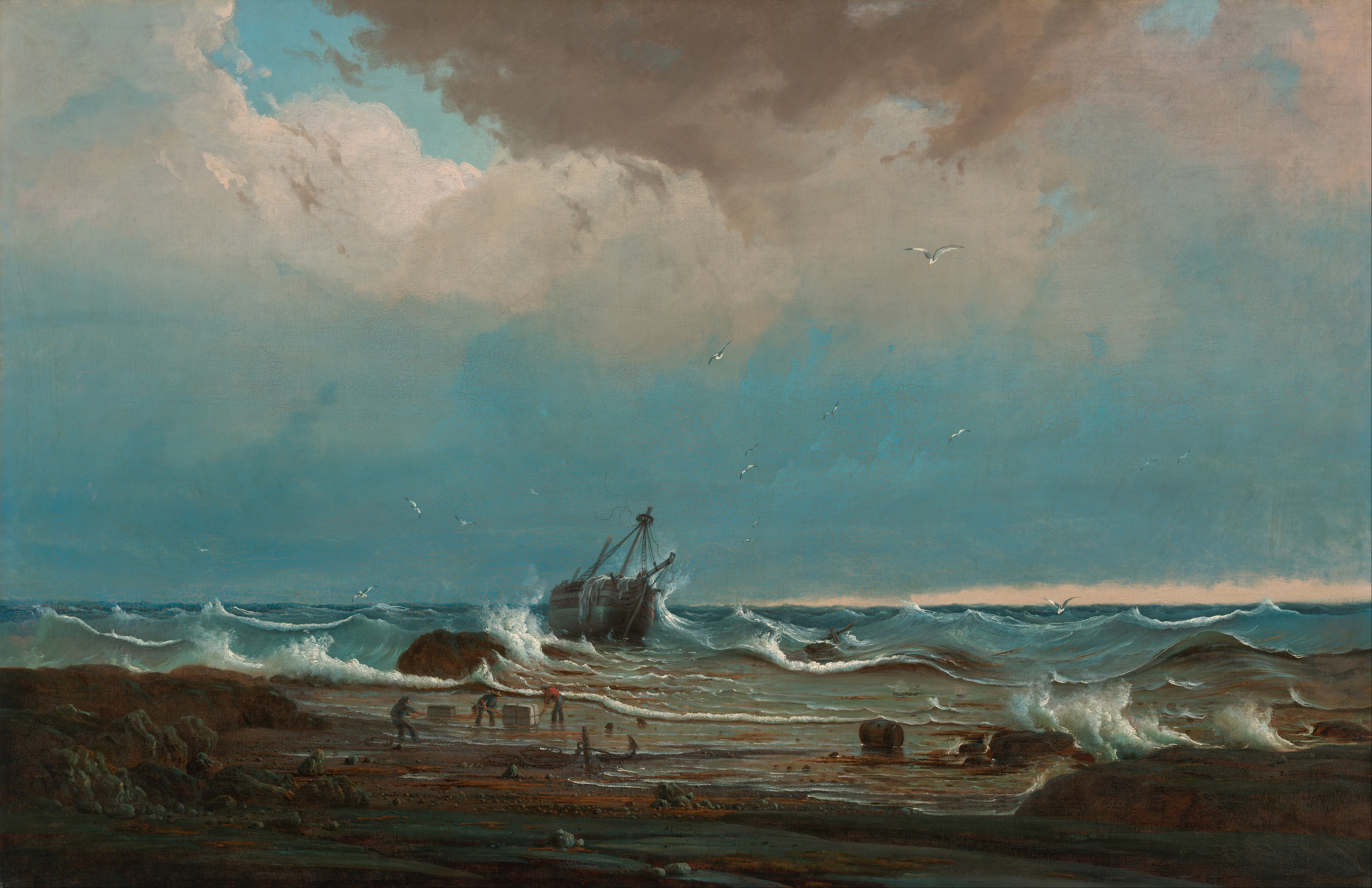
Wreck of convict ship George III off Southport, 1835

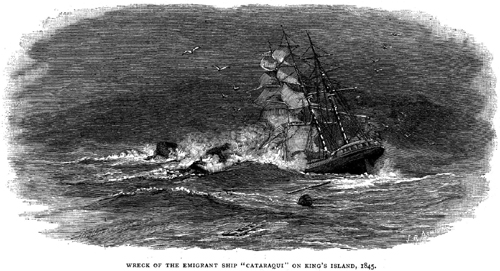
Wreck of emigrant ship Cataraqui off King Island, 1845

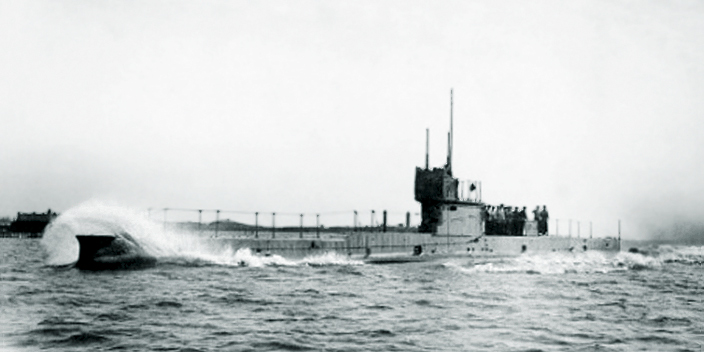
Submarine HMAS AE1, lost off Papua New Guinea in 1914

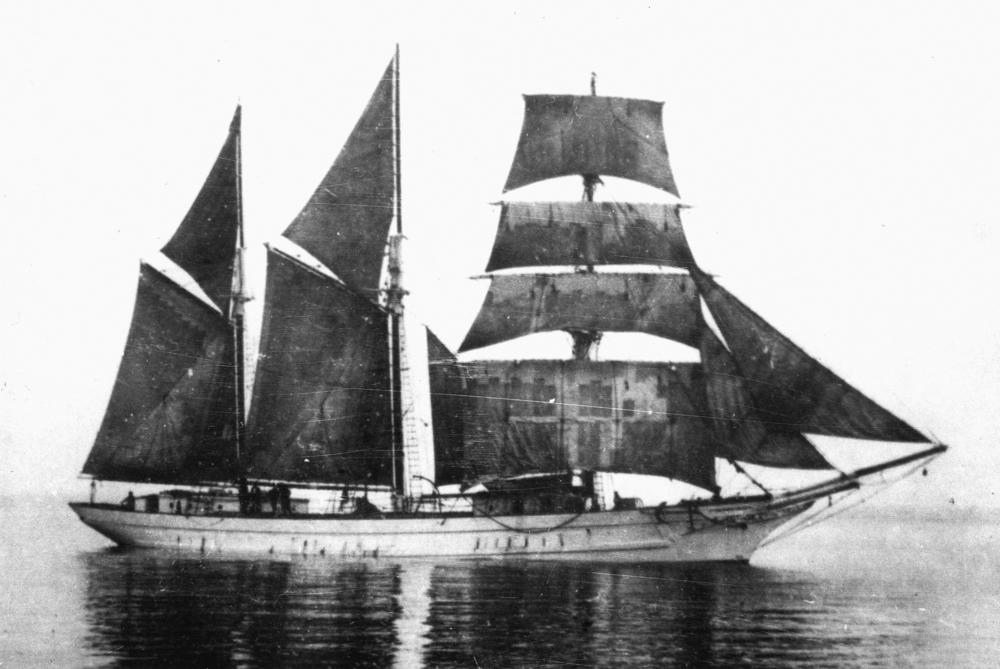
Mission ship Southern Cross, sunk off King Island, 1920

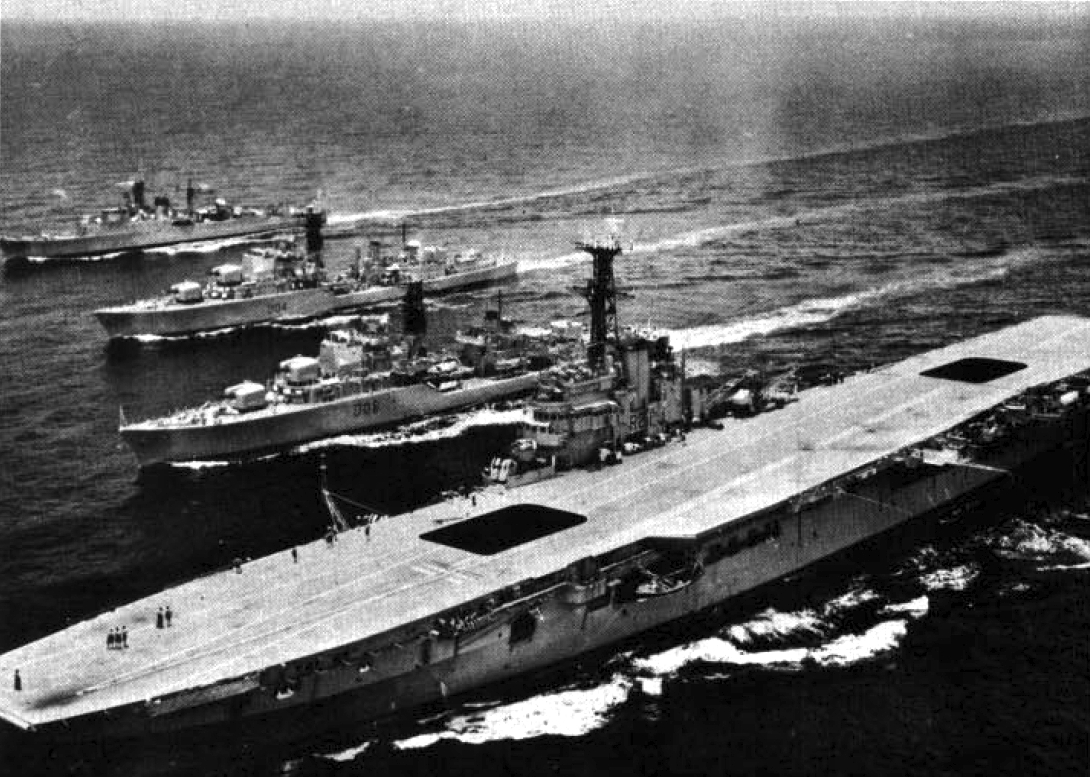
Destroyer HMAS Voyager (2nd from top) with aircraft carrier HMAS Melbourne, c1962

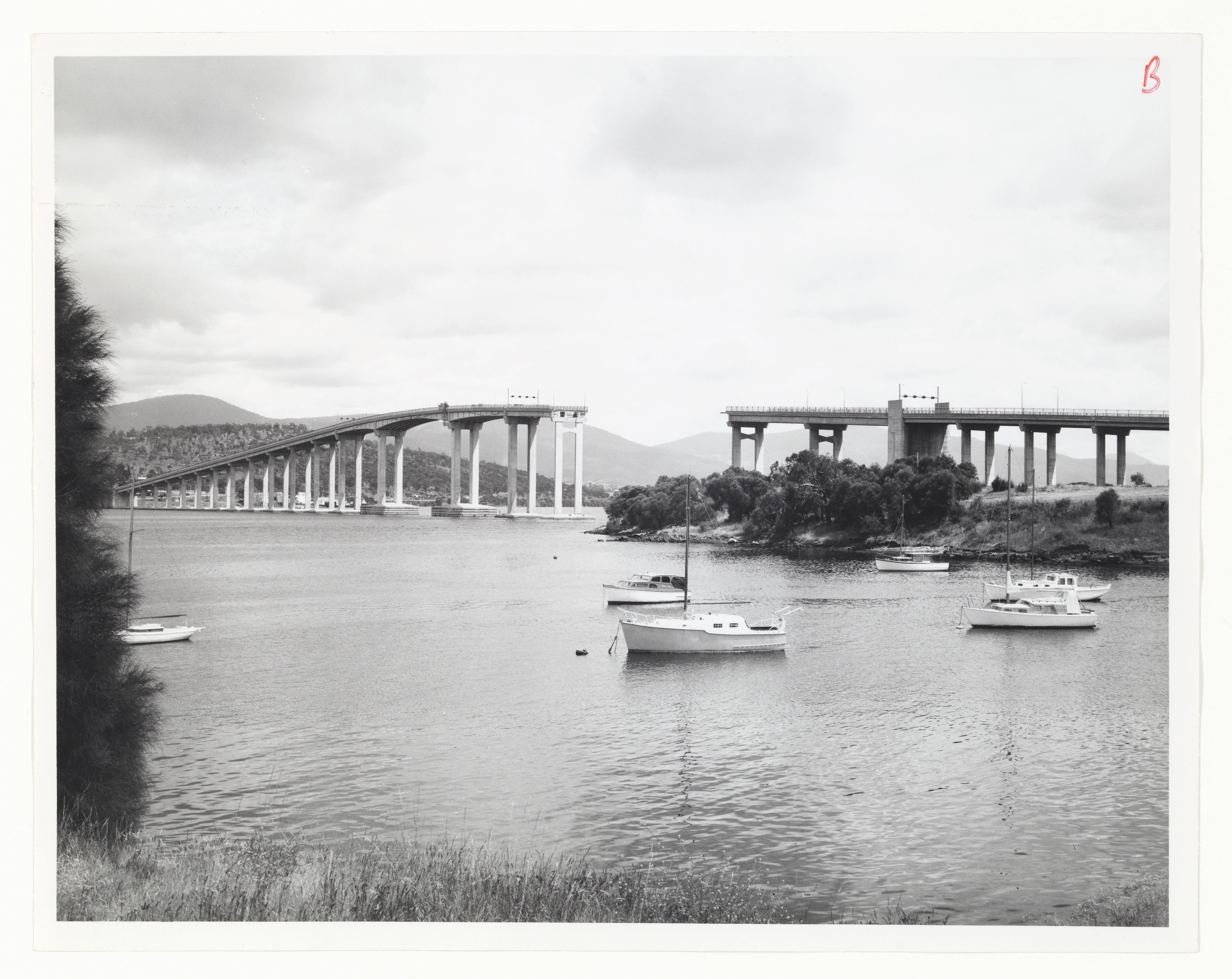
Tasman Bridge after collision from Lake Illawarra, 1975

== Design ==
Ichthys or "fish" symbol of the early Christian church

The Memorial is a simple, almost unassuming structure designed to present a multitude of individual plaques for quiet viewing and contemplation. Sited in a park on Esplanade West, Triabunna and overlooking the local port of Spring Bay, the structure comprises low, curved masonry walls forming a fish shape in plan, upon the capping of which are set the commemorative plaques. Openings to each side allow viewers into the centre of the Memorial, where a masonry boat-like plinth supports a large vertical anchor cross and the Merchant Naval plaque. A separate sandstone bollard to one side carries the main Naval plaque, while ahead and on the front quarters of the Memorial stand ships masts with halyards and lights, and a flagpole.

Open space is provided around the main structure to allow for the conducting of significant ceremonies and services, a number of which occur each year. The design combines both maritime and spiritual influences by incorporating a plan layout which reflects the early Christian ichthys or "fish" symbol, and was undertaken by local Tasmanians Mrs K. M. Fergusson OAM and J. G. Castle.

== Annual service ==
Commencing in 1998, the memorial has conducted an annual service of dedication, usually held on the third Sunday in October. This timing allows the service to include the annual Blessing of the Fleet for the local fishing industry.

The services have frequently been attended by dignitaries, servicemen and survivors including his Hon. the Governor of Tasmania; Federal and State politicians; the Chief Justice of the Tasmanian Supreme Court; and senior officers of the Royal Australian Navy.

== Memorial plaques ==
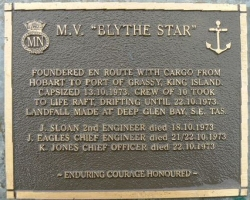
Memorial plaque for MV Blythe Star, lost off South West Cape in 1973

Individual memorial plaques are installed at the Tasmanian Seafarers' Memorial to commemorate the loss of over 100 individual vessels, and which resulted in the deaths of over 1400 persons. Additional plaques have been mounted for events significant to the local community and Tasmania, such as the tragedies at Oyster Bay and Spring Bay, the 1998 Sydney to Hobart yacht race, and the drowning of Tasmanian prisoners of war during World War II. A third group of plaques comprise the Spring Bay Professional Fishermen's Memorial. Other significant memorials in the complex include the Tasmanian Merchant Navy Memorial and the Tasmanian Naval Seafarers' Memorial.

== See also ==
- Shipwrecks of Tasmania
- Shipwrecks of Australia
