= Thumbnail (disambiguation) =

A thumbnail is a reduced-size version of a computer graphic.

Thumbnail may also refer to:

- Thumbnail (anatomy), part of the thumb
- Thumbnail (album), by AKB48
- Thumbnail (cliff), in Greenland

== See also ==
- Thumb (disambiguation)
- Nail (disambiguation)
