= Neva (1813 ship) =

Three-masted English barque

History

United Kingdom
- Name: Neva
- Builder: Bunney & Firbank, Hull
- Launched: 15 July 1813
- Refit: Early 1830s as convict carrier
- Fate: Wrecked in Bass Strait, 13 May 1835

General characteristics
- Tons burthen: 327 or 333 (bm)
- Length: 104 ft 4 in (31.80 m)
- Beam: 27 ft 1 in (8.26 m)
- Height: 6 ft 5 in (1.96 m)
- Sail plan: Three-Mast Barque
- Crew: 26
- Armament: 4 × 9-pounder guns

Neva was a three-masted barque launched in 1813. She made two voyages transporting convicts to Australia. On her second voyage carrying convicts she wrecked in Bass Strait on 13 May 1835. Her loss was one of the worst shipwrecks in Australian history; 224 people died.

== Origins and career ==
Neva was built at Hull, England by Bunney and Firbank in 1813. She entered Lloyd's Register in 1814 with Bunney, master, Capt & Co. owner, and trade Hull-Saint Petersburg.

| Year | Master | Owner | Trade | Source |
|---|---|---|---|---|
| 1815 | J. Adams | Jenkins & Co. | Hull–St Petersburg; London–West Indies | Register of Shipping (RS) |
| 1820 | Ferguson | Green & Co. | London–Jamaica | RS |
| 1825 | Blake | Green & Co. | London–Jamaica; London–Memel | RS |
| 1830 | Coombes; Spratley | Moates & Co. | London transport | RS |

Neva spent most of her career as a West Indiaman. However, from January 1828 to May 1832 Neva was in the transport service, sailing to North America, the Mediterranean, the West Indies, and so forth. She underwent repairs for damages in 1826. After her contract with the transport service ended, she underwent a thorough repair at Deptford. The Register of Shipping for 1833 showed her owner as Moates, her master changing from Spratley to Peek, and her trade changing from London transport to London–New South Wales.

On 27 July 1833 Captain Benjamin H. Peck sailed Neva from Plymouth for Port Jackson, and she arrived on 21 November She had embarked 170 male convicts and she suffered one convict death en route. From Port Jackson she sailed to Manila and then Singapore, where she picked up a cargo for London. In London she underwent a small repair prior to her second voyage carrying convicts.

== Final voyage and wreck ==
Neva sailed from Cork, Ireland for Sydney on 8 January 1835, carrying 150 female convicts with 33 children, and nine free women (probably wives of convicts) with 22 children, under the care of Surgeon Superintendent John Stephenson, R.N., and 26 crew under the command of Captain Benjamin Peck. With the deaths of a crewman, a convict and a free woman, and one birth, during the voyage, by the time she reached the Australian coastline Neva's total complement was 239.

About 5 a.m. on 13 May 1835 Neva hit a reef north or northwest of King Island in Bass Strait and broke up rapidly. Many of the women became hopelessly drunk on rum that was being carried as cargo and were unable to save themselves. Twenty-two survivors drifted ashore on the northern end of King Island on two rafts formed by the fore and aft decks of the collapsed ship, but seven of these died of exposure "aided if not abetted by the inordinate use of rum" during the first night ashore.

The remaining fifteen survivors, including the captain and the chief officer, met up with the survivors of a small vessel Tartar wrecked before the Neva and were also supplied with some provisions by a local beachcomber John Scott, who had Tasmanian Aboriginal wives and children. About a fortnight later the schooner Sarah Ann (under charter to the owner of the Tartar) located them and then carried most to Launceston. Three were hunting in the bush, probably with Scott and his family, when the Sarah Ann left, and later reached Launceston on the Government cutter Shamrock.

== The cause of the disaster ==
Initial press reports state that Neva was wrecked on the Harbinger Reefs NW of Cape Wickham at the northern end of King Island, although some later reports give the location as the Navarine Reefs, which lie northeast of Cape Wickham. An inquiry into the loss of the ship exonerated Captain Peck from any blame and attempted to demonstrate that the Navarine Reefs were not the location of the disaster. A map by the master suggests that the vessel hit an uncharted reef well to the west of King Island, but most modern reconstructions suggest Neva hit the Harbinger Reefs because Peck had failed to allow for the set of the currents at the northern end of the island after land was first seen. However, the most recent book argues that the Navarine Reefs are equally plausible, and ultimately only archaeological survey can confirm the location.

== The wreck of Neva in fiction ==
The wreck of Neva was clearly the inspiration for a pamphlet The Particulars of the Dreadful Shipwreck of the Ship Tartar, Free Trader, With the Horrible Sufferings of Part of the Crew, Who were compelled to Eat each other to Support Existence, published by John Carmichael of Glasgow in 1840. It purports to tell the story of John M. Daniel of Galway, sole survivor of the ship Tartar of 837 tons (which does not appear in Lloyd’s Register) that sailed from Cork on 8 January 1839 for Sydney with 75 crew and passengers, including ten women and thirteen children, but was wrecked on an island west of King Island on 13 April. Twenty-two survivors landed on the uninhabited island, seven died soon afterwards, and the remainder built a raft on which they endeavoured to reach King Island. It was this party that was forced to eat each other until the raft drifted ashore, by which time only two survived. One of these, the vessel’s master J. H. Peck, died soon after landing.

== Memorial ==
A memorial plaque dedicated to Neva is at the Tasmanian Seafarers' Memorial at Triabunna on the east coast of Tasmania.

The plaque contains the following text:

Neva

Convict Transport Barque of 327 tons
sailed from Cork, Ireland on 8.1.1835.
Captain Peck with 26 officers and crew,
150 female convicts with 33 children,
9 free women and 22 children bound for
Sydney. 13.5.1835 struck Harbinger Reef
north of King Island with 239 aboard.
22 made landfall where 7 later died.

~ Tasmania's second worst shipwr ~

== See also ==
- List of disasters in Australia by death toll
