= MV Blythe Star =

Freighter that sank near Tasmania in 1973

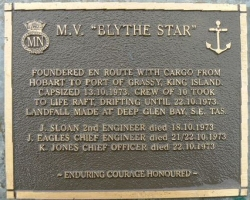

History
- Name: Tandik
- Owner: Rederi A/S Orion
- Port of registry: Norway
- Builder: Ateliers Ducheans and Bossiere, Le Havre, France
- Launched: 1955
- Notes: Sold and renamed, 1960

History
- Name: Blythe Star
- Owner: Bass Strait Shipping Co
- Operator: Tasmanian Transport Commission
- Acquired: April 1960
- Fate: Capsized and sank off SW Cape, Tasmania, 13 Oct 1973
- Notes: Vessel no. 315392

General characteristics
- Type: Steel-hulled coastal freighter
- Tonnage: 321 tons gross
- Length: 144 feet (44 m)
- Beam: 25 feet (7.6 m)
- Draught: 10 feet (3.0 m)
- Installed power: 490BHP diesel
- Speed: 10 knots (19 km/h; 12 mph)
- Crew: 10

The vessel MV Blythe Star was a coastal freighter which foundered off south-western Tasmania in October 1973. The crew of 10 successfully took to a small inflatable liferaft but drifted undiscovered. A search for the ship and its crew led to the largest maritime search operation conducted in Australia to that time.

After 11 days the survivors were found ashore in rugged terrain near Deep Glen Bay on Tasmania's Forestier Peninsula. Three of the crew died as a result of the ordeal. As a result of this tragedy, the AUSREP maritime position reporting system was introduced to the Australian Navigation Act.

No sign of the vessel was found until the mid-to-late 1990s when the crews of local fishing boats identified the presence of a large wreck; and the crew of a trawler recovered a bell which was positively identified as belonging to Blythe Star. The wreck was then formally identified by the CSIRO and UTAS in April 2023.

== Vessel history ==
Blythe Star was the second vessel to be operated with this name in Tasmania during the mid-twentieth century. The first, commonly referred to as Blythe Star I, itself was lost after an engine room fire in the late 1950s.

Blythe Star (II) was a small freighter vessel of 371 gross tons, built by Ateliers Ducheans and Bossiere at Le Havre France in 1955, for owners Rederi A/S Orion of Drammen Norway. Originally called Tandik, the vessel was purchased by the Bass Strait Shipping Company in 1960 and renamed Blythe Star.

Records indicate that, while in Australia, it operated as a coastal freighter around Tasmania and surrounding islands, along with cross-Bass Strait voyages to mainland Australia and around its coasts.

== Last voyage ==
On 12 October 1973, Blythe Star left Prince of Wales Bay, Hobart, Tasmania bound for Currie on King Island, located in Bass Strait. Its cargo comprised superphosphate fertilizer, believed to be in stacked bags on pallets, and a ton of VB beer in kegs. Sea conditions were reported as calm with a soft rolling swell. Shortly after leaving Hobart, the vessel turned to starboard and set a course to King Island around the western side of Tasmania.

By the next morning, with the weather and sea conditions still good, the vessel was a short distance off South West Cape when, between 8:00am and 8:30am, a sudden list developed to starboard. After briefly stabilising, the list quickly increased until much of the starboard side was below the waterline and seawater began entering the vessel through unsecured openings. Those crew members asleep below decks were thrown from their bunks, and all the crew struggled to make their way through rising water to the rear deck area. The capsize appears to have been completely unexpected by the crew, with the captain later quoted as saying:

All seemed well, with nothing out of the ordinary. It was fine weather - beautiful weather. Suddenly there was a lurch. I thought "That's really funny!" Next thing I knew she was lying over on her starboard side.

The ship's lifeboat was unable to be launched due to the extreme list angle; however, an inflatable liferaft was released into the sea by the boatswain, Stan Leary. Once inflated by his gas, the crew all managed to board it and it was cut free of the ship by young crewmember Michael Doleman. Very shortly after, Blythe Star's bow lifted high and it sank stern-first into the Southern Ocean, approximately 5 nautical miles (9.3 km; 5.8 mi) west of South West Cape in 80 fathoms (480 ft; 146 m) of water. No distress call had been made by the captain at the time of the sinking.

== Search operations ==
With the port of departure Hobart being located in Tasmania's south-east, two possible routes existed for a voyage to King Island located off Tasmania's north-west corner: around the western side of Tasmania, or up the eastern coast. Unfortunately for all concerned, no notice had been left by Blythe Star as to which direction the vessel would take, and this immediately compromised the efficiency of the search operation that was launched on 15 October when she failed to arrive at King Island and there had been no radio contact.

The preliminary search conducted by light aircraft (on the 16 October a HS748 - A10-608 - was despatched from RAAF East Sale, designated as the first search aircraft, to circumnavigate Tasmania in search) was followed on 17 October by a major air search employing nine military aircraft, coordinated by the Marine Operations Centre in Canberra, ACT. After seven days of searching, it was decided to call-off the full-scale search after nothing apart from some minor flotsam unrelated to Blythe Star was found.

Despite the most extensive air-sea search yet conducted in Australia, no trace of the vessel could be found. Parliamentary records note that the search was a large operation with a total of 14 aircraft involved. The cost was noted as over AUD$250,000 in 1973, utilising equipment worth many tens of millions of dollars. Official investigations ceased on 23 October 1973 after no sign of the vessel, debris or crew had been found.

== Fate of the crew ==
Crew member	Rank	Fate
Cpt George Cruickshank	Master	Survived
Kenneth Jones	Chief Officer	Perished at Deep Glen Bay after landfall
John Eagles	Chief Engineer	Perished at Deep Glen Bay after landfall
John Sloan	2nd Engineer	Died at sea ~ 16 October 1973
Stan Leary	Bosun	Survived
Malcolm McCarroll	Seaman	Survived
Michael Doleman	Seaman	Survived
Cliff Langford	Seaman	Survived
Brenton 'Mick' Power	Seaman	Survived
Alfred Simpson	Cook	Survived

The inflatable liferaft to which the crew escaped was 12 feet (3.7 m) in diameter, covered with an orange canopy, and equipped with tinned water, old biscuits, some flares, two oars and a baling pail. In the rush to abandon ship, the emergency radio had been left on board; however, the crew expected to be quickly spotted by searchers or passing ships. This did not happen, and by several days into their ordeal the weather had worsened significantly. Keeping the raft upright and afloat took much effort, with big waves regularly collapsing the inflatable vessel onto itself, and water needing to be constantly bailed-out.

Over the ensuing days, the raft drifted south-eastward around the south of Tasmania, increasingly distant from land. After three days of worsening conditions John Sloan died, possibly due to a lack of his normal medication, and after waiting for a possible rescue, he was slid into the sea the next evening. Around this time, Japanese fishing vessels were spotted but they did not repond to the signal flare used by the crew and sailed away (possibly due to illegal fishing). A welcome weather change then carried them north as far as Schouten Island off the Freycinet Peninsula, following which the raft drifted south-westerly approximately parallel to Tasmania's eastern coastline. On the ninth day, they came close to a small rocky bay and the crew successfully made landfall on the Forestier Peninsula at Deep Glen Bay.

Soon, the nine survivors attempted to find an overland way out of the bay. The steep, precipitous cliffs and almost impenetrable vegetation made any progress exhausting, and within a short period another two crewmen, John Eagles and Ken Jones, died of suspected privations, exhaustion and hypothermia. Eventually, Michael Doleman, Malcolm McCarroll, and Alfred Simpson set out together and over the next day and night managed to scale the cliffs and force their way through the rainforest until they came to a rough track.

Almost immediately, a vehicle was heard approaching, driven by local forester Rod Smith, who told them that they were supposed to be dead. The three were eventually taken to the nearby township of Dunalley, where a helicopter was quickly arranged to collect the remaining four crew members from Deep Glen Bay. The men had not eaten in four days and memorial services had already been held for some of them. All seven survivors recovered after spending time in the Royal Hobart Hospital.

== Reports and recommendations ==
A Ministerial Statement was made in the Australian House of Representatives on 24 October 1973 by Charles Jones, Minister for Transport, upon receipt of the news that the missing crewmen had been found. A preliminary investigation was announced, along with a subsequent wide-ranging inquiry.

A motion was moved in the Australian Parliament on 11 November 1973 by Bill Wenthworth, to appoint a committee to investigate the circumstances of why the liferaft and survivors were not located by the search, and to consider measures to facilitate the better location of distressed vessels in future. An extract from his speech included the following description of the drifting lifeboat:

This is an incredible story because there was mounted a large and expensive search with all the technical facilities at our command. Yet this raft, starting from the most probable point where the vessel would have sunk, passing by lighthouses and coast watchers, through fishing vessels, near other vessels, across the mouth of the Derwent River that runs into Hobart, past another lighthouse within a few hundred yards, and within sighting distance of a tourist hotel, still was not located and was given up for lost. I think the House will agree with me that this is a most extraordinary chain of events.

This motion was subsequently withdrawn in recognition of the Court of Marine Inquiry announced by the government to start later that year by Justice Edward Dunphy. This judicial inquiry followed an earlier preliminary investigation headed by a Captain Taylor. The court of inquiry was held at Melbourne between 3 December 1973 and 14 February 1974; virtually none of those involved in the vessel's operations, or in the search that commenced after she was reported missing, escaped criticism.

A forensic report "Loss of MV Blythe Star" was published by R. J. Herd in January 1974, possibly as part of the court of inquiry being conducted at that time, with its findings summarised in The Australian Naval Architect journal of August 1999. Herd concluded that while there was no evidence that the vessel was overloaded or incorrectly loaded, it seems likely that manipulation of the vessel's ballast tanks shortly before the capsize, possibly inadvertently, fatally impaired the ship's stability given the configuration of its loading. In the scenario postulated, one of the main ballast tanks in the vessel's double-bottomed hull may have been drained to the level where a broad free water surface was created low down in the ship, and this would significantly compromise the vessel's rolling stability. Due to the loss of the crew members most knowledgeable about these operations, such conclusions can only be speculative and are primarily based upon forensic calculations.

== Legacy ==
The sinking of Blythe Star and the flawed rescue efforts led to widespread media attention and scrutiny of maritime practices which "changed Australian maritime laws and Search & Rescue practices forever". According to one source:

As a result of this tragedy the Australian Government amended the Navigation Act requiring ships of 300 tons or more to lodge a sailing plan and give daily position reports to overcome the difficulty experienced in searching for the MV Blythe Star for which it was not known whether a sailing course to King Island was taking the vessel east or west about Tasmania to its destination. This safety system is known as AUSREP or the Australian Ship Reporting System.

A memorial plaque, dedicated to Blythe Star at the Tasmanian Seafarers' Memorial at Triabunna, is on the east coast of Tasmania, approximately 50 kilometres (31 mi) north of where the surviving crew made landfall at Deep Glen Bay. The text of the plaque honours the dead sailors (as per the image above).

After requests by family members of the crew for the 50th anniversary of the sinking, a search by the CSIRO was undertaken in April 2023. Utilising the CSIRO vessel MV Investigator, reports from fishing vessels and a previous survey that uncovered a 'blip' in the area, the vessel was discovered on the 12th in 150 metres of water 10.5 kilometres west of South West Cape, off the southwest coast of Tasmania. Doleman (aged 18 at the time of the disaster), the last surviving crew member, was on board for the discovery.

ABC Australia released a 5-part podcast to commemorate the 50th anniversary was released from October 2023. Doleman, his wife, and Smith were all interviewed in detail (as were some of the survivor's children and journalists of the time), providing valuable first-person perspectives on the disaster.

Another plaque exists at Constitution Dock in Hobart, unveiled to commemorate the 50th anniversary. Alongside the commemorations, there have also been some calls for an official apology.

== See also ==
- Shipwrecks of Tasmania
- Shipwrecks of Australia
