= Mick Doleman =

Australian maritime worker

Michael Thomas Doleman (b. c.1955) is an Australian maritime worker and trade union official.

== Blythe Star ==
Mick Doleman started his occupational life as a maritime worker within the domestic waters of Australia at the age of 16, following his father into the profession. His first post aboard was as a relieving deckboy on the Shell tanker, the Solen. He first came to prominence when, at the age of eighteen, he was a crew member of the Blythe Star which sank while travelling from Hobart to King Island. The resulting search was the most extensive air search ever conducted in Australia at the time, and the vessel could not be located. Doleman was among the seven crew who were found eleven days later on the Forestier Peninsula having escaped to the liferaft when ship suddenly capsized and sank off South West Cape, Tasmania; three lives were lost. He subsequently gave evidence at the Dunphy enquiry into the sinking of the Blythe Star into the ship's master's failure of duty. In 2015, Doleman participated in an ABC radio documentary about the incident and the subsequent rescue, his first public comment since the enquiry. Doleman explained that enquiry led to significant changes in reporting of maritime schedules and mandatory requirements for the carrying of EPIRBs.

== Trade unions ==
He continued a maritime career in domestic and international waters before coming an officer of the Seamen's Union of Australia. In 1984 he was elected as Assistant Victorian Branch Secretary of the Seamen's Union of Australia, and in 1987 he became the branch secretary. During his time with the union he also served as the president of the Victorian Trades Hall Council. From 1997, he moved from the Victorian branch of the union to the National Office, initially as a National Organiser, then sequentially as Assistant National Secretary, then Deputy National Secretary of the Maritime Union of Australia (MUA). One of the major campaigns in which he was involved was the Patrick's waterfront dispute in 1998.

Doleman has been a campaigner to prevent men's violence against women, and he was appointed Australia's White Ribbon Ambassador for 2011 in recognition of the impact his advocacy in extending the White Ribbon Campaign into all aspects of the maritime union's activities. This interest sprung from the enquiry into discrimination and gender-based violence within the Australian Defence Force, and that Doleman had ordered an enquiry that showed similar issues that were seen to exist within the merchant navy.

In 2014 Doleman resigned as an official of MUA, for in 2015 taking up a position of International Executive Officer with the newly formed Maritime International Federation (MIF), a federation, which currently consists of the Papua New Guinea Maritime and Transport Workers Union, Maritime Union of New Zealand and the Maritime Union of Australia and with interest with some of the other countries of South East Asia. The federation is affiliated with the International Transport Workers’ Federation.
