= Tasman Bridge disaster =

1975 bridge collapse in Hobart, Tasmania, Australia

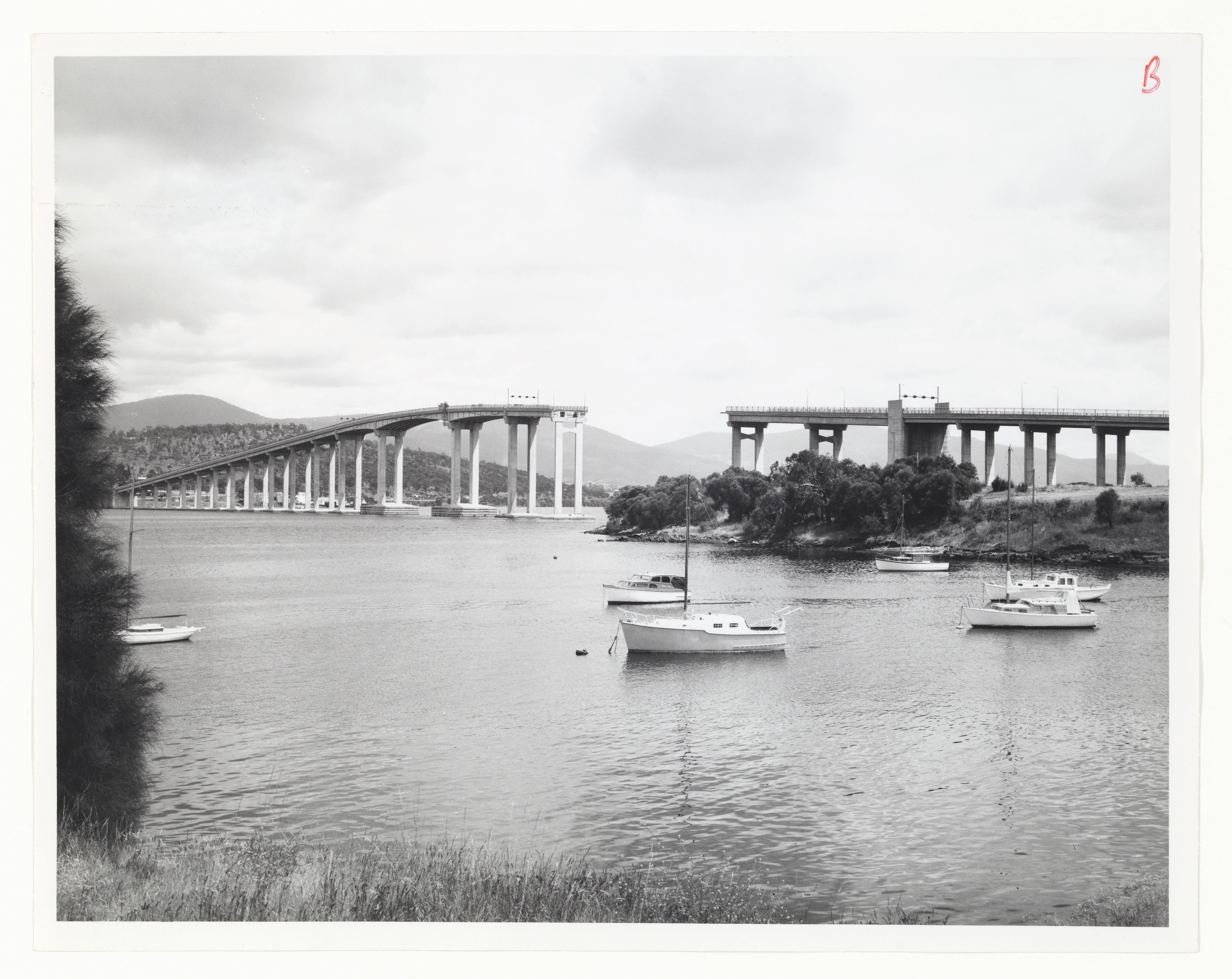
- Tasman Bridge from east following collision, 1975
- Date: 5 January 1975
- Time: 9:27 p.m. (AEDT)
- Location: Hobart, Tasmania, Australia; 42°51′53″S 147°20′48″E
- Type: Accident
- Cause: Bulk carrier Lake Illawarra colliding with two bridge piers
- Deaths: 12

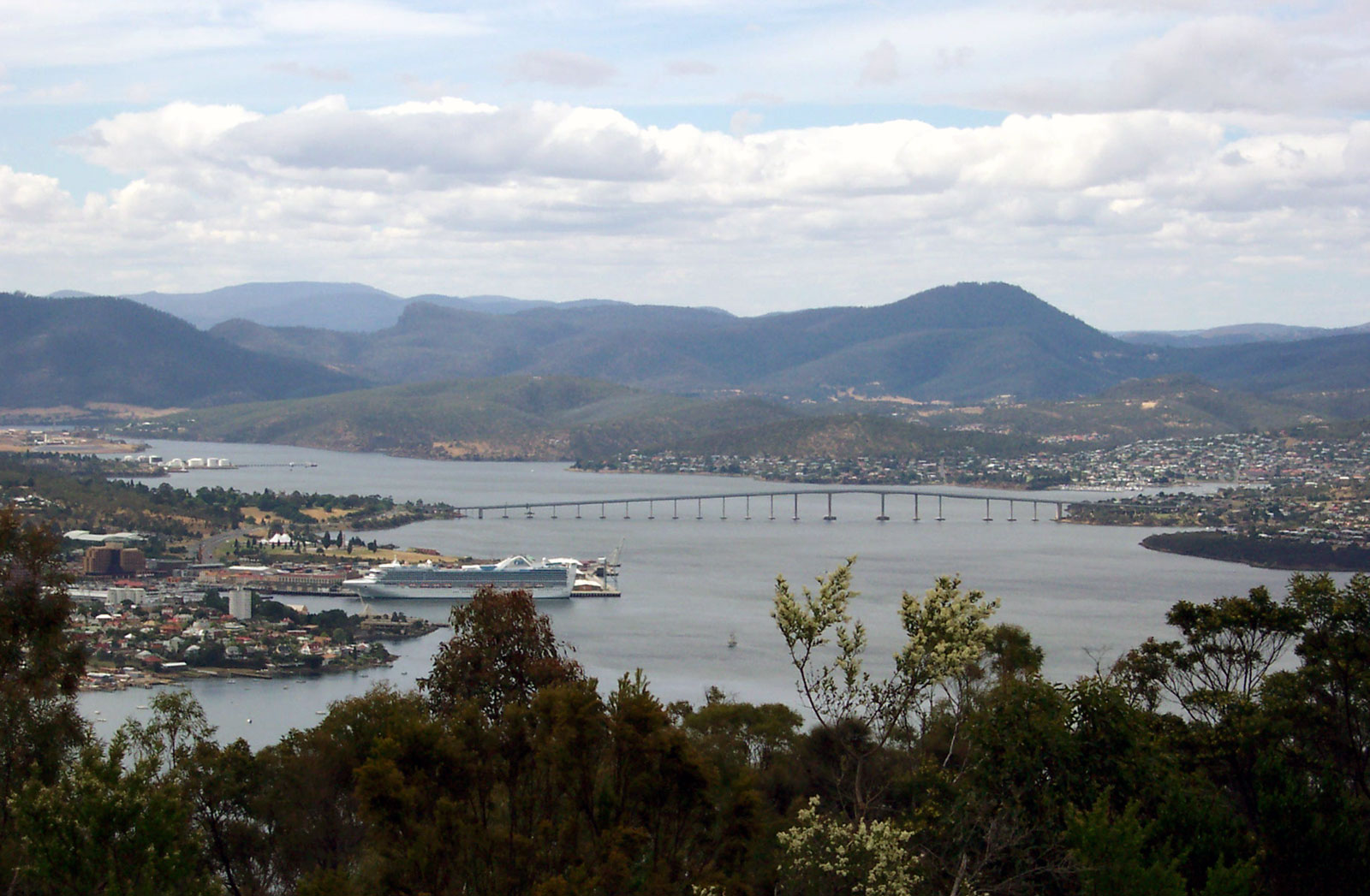
View of the bridge as it stood in 2006

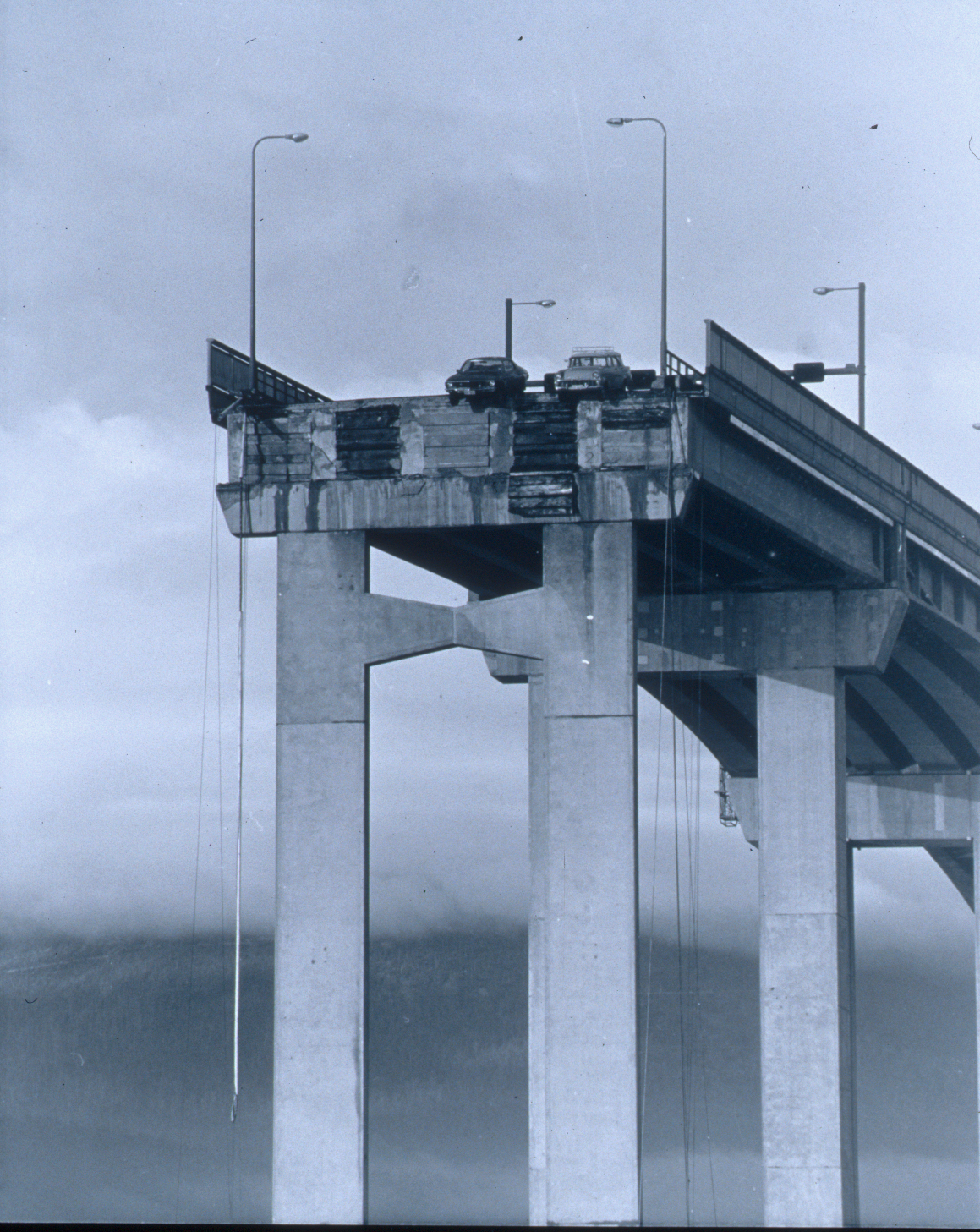
The Tasman Bridge after the collision

On the evening of 5 January 1975, the bulk carrier Lake Illawarra, travelling up the River Derwent, collided with several pylons of the Tasman Bridge in Hobart, the capital city of Australia's island state of Tasmania. This collision caused a large section of the bridge deck to collapse onto the ship and into the river below. Twelve people were killed, including seven crew on board Lake Illawarra, and the five occupants of four cars which fell 45 metres (150 ft) after driving off the bridge. Hobart was cut off from its eastern suburbs, and the loss of the road connection had a major social impact. The ship's master was officially penalised for inattention and failure to handle his vessel in a seamanlike manner.

== Collision and collapse ==
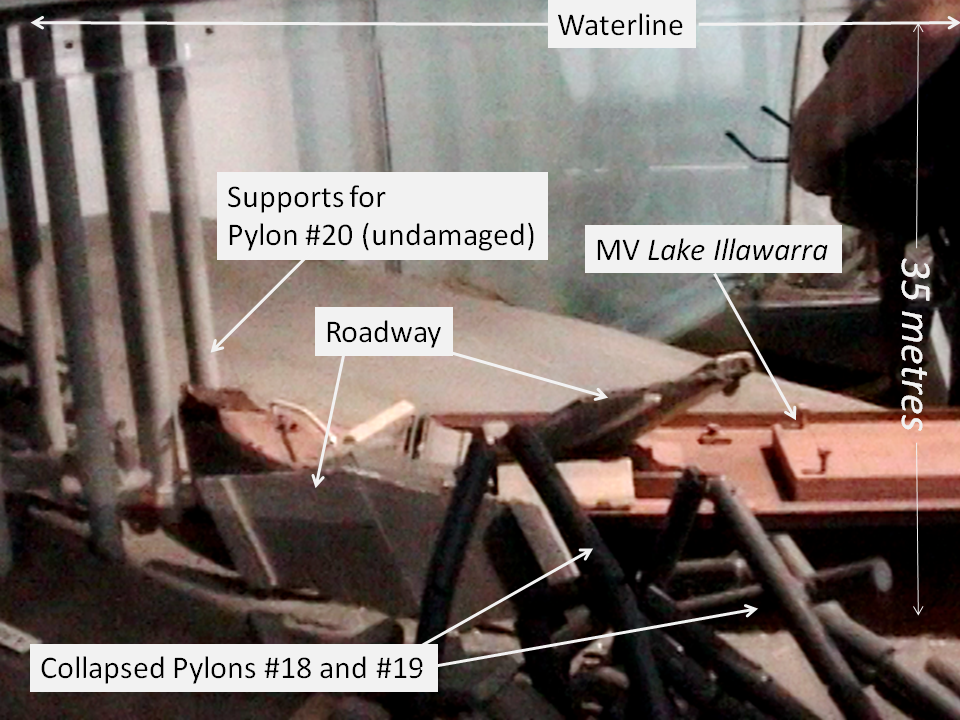
Model showing the scene on the bottom of the River Derwent

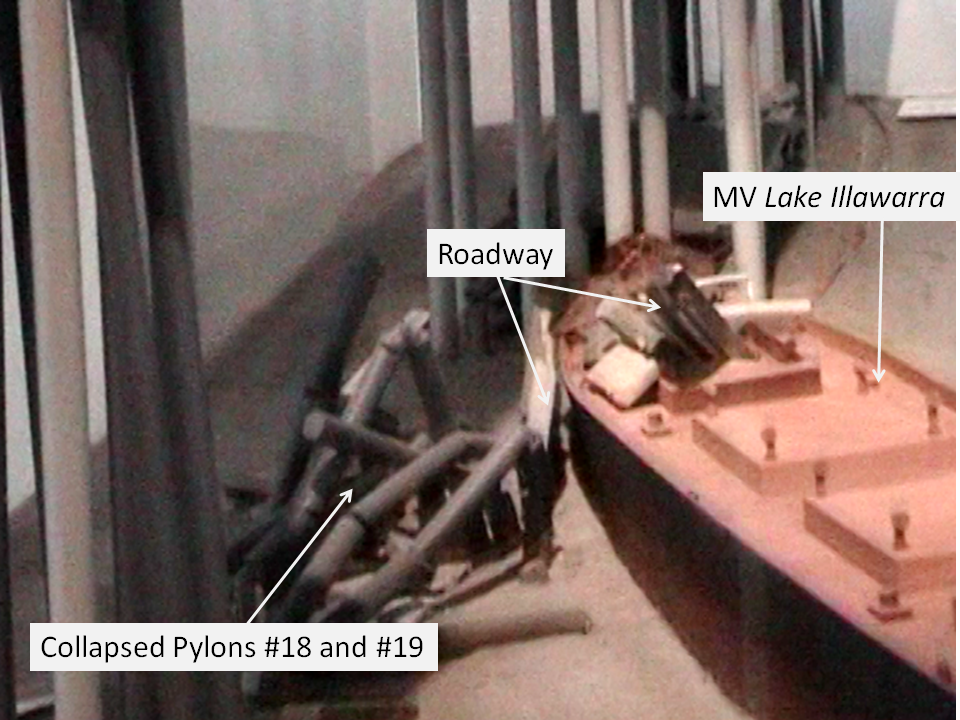

The collision occurred at 9:27 p.m. Australian Eastern Daylight Time (UTC+11:00) on Sunday 5 January 1975. The bulk carrier Lake Illawarra, carrying 10,000 tonnes (11,000 short tons; 22,000,000 lb) of zinc ore concentrate, was heading up the River Derwent to offload its cargo to EZ Industries' Risdon Zinc Works, upstream from Hobart and about 3 km (1.9 mi) from the bridge. The 1,025 m (3,363 ft) long main viaduct of the bridge was composed of a central main navigation span, two flanking secondary navigation spans, and nineteen approach spans. The ship was off course as it neared the bridge, partly due to the strong tidal current but also because of inattention by the ship's master, Captain Boleslaw Pelc. Initially approaching the bridge at eight knots (15 km/h; 9.2 mph), Pelc slowed the ship to a "safe" speed. Although Lake Illawarra was capable of passing through the bridge's central navigation span, Pelc attempted to pass through one of the eastern spans.

Despite several changes of course, Lake Illawarra proved unmanageable due to having insufficient steerage way. In desperation Pelc ordered "full speed astern", at which point all control was lost. The vessel drifted towards the bridge midway between the central navigation span and the eastern shore, colliding bow first with the pile capping of Pier 19 and then amidships with Pier 18, bringing three unsupported spans and a 127-metre (417 ft) section of roadway crashing into the river and onto the ship's deck. Lake Illawarra listed to starboard and sank within minutes a short distance to the south, in 35 metres (115 ft) of water. Seven crew members were trapped and drowned. The subsequent Court of Marine Inquiry found that Pelc had not handled the ship in a proper and seamanlike manner, and his certificate was suspended for six months.

As the collision occurred on a Sunday evening, there was relatively little traffic on the bridge. While no cars were travelling between the 18th and 19th pylons when that section collapsed, four cars drove over the gap, killing five occupants. Two drivers managed to stop their vehicles at the edge, but not before their front wheels had dropped over the lip of the bridge deck. One of these cars contained Frank and Sylvia Manley in their Holden HQ Monaro.

As we approached, it was a foggy night ... there was no lights on the bridge at the time. We just thought there was an accident. We slowed down to about 40 km/h (25 mph) and I'm peering out the window, desperately looking to see the car ... what was happening on the bridge. We couldn't see anything but we kept on travelling. The next thing, I said to Frank, "The bridge is gone!" And he just applied the brakes and we just sat there swinging. As we sat there, we couldn't see anything in the water. All we could see was a big whirlpool of water and apparently the boat was sinking. So with that, we undid the car door and I hopped out.

— Sylvia Manley

[Sylvia] said "The white line, the white line's gone. Stop!" I just hit the brakes and I said "I can't, I can't, I can't stop." And next thing we just hung off the gap ... when I swung the door open, I could see, more or less, see the water ... and I just swung meself towards the back of the car and grabbed the headrest like that to pull myself around. There's a big automatic transmission pan underneath [the car] – that's what it balanced on.

— Frank Manley

The other car contained Murray Ling, his wife Helen and two of their children. They were driving over the bridge in the east-bound lanes when the span lights went out: 'I knew something bad must have happened so I slowed down'. Ling then noticed several cars ahead of him seemingly disappear as they drove straight over the edge, so he slammed his foot on the brakes. He stopped the car inches from the drop. A following car, caught unaware by the unexpected stop, drove into the rear of Ling's car, pushing its front wheels over the breach. He, too, eased himself and his young family out of the car, then stood horrified as two other cars ignored his attempts to wave them down, raced past (one of which actually swerved around to avoid him), and hurtled over the edge into the river. A loaded bus full of people swerved and skidded, slamming into the side railings after being waved down by Ling.

== Emergency response ==
Private citizens living nearby were on the scene early, even before Lake Illawarra had sunk. Three of these were Jack Read in his H28 yacht Mermerus; David Read in a small launch; and Jerry Chamberlain, who had their boats moored in Montagu Bay close by. These and others, and many shore-based residents, were responsible for saving many of the crew from Lake Illawarra. Those in small craft acted alone in very difficult circumstances with falling concrete, live wires, and water from a broken pipe above, until the water police arrived on the scene. A large number of other organisations were involved in the emergency response, including police, ambulance service, fire brigade, emergency management agency, marine board, Royal Hobart Hospital, the Hobart Tug Company, the Public Works Department, the Transport Commission, the HydroElectric Commission, the Hobart Regional Water Board, the Australian Army and the Royal Australian Navy. At 2:30 am, a fourteen-man Navy Clearance Diving Team flew to Hobart to assist water police in the recovery of the vehicles which had driven off the bridge. Two vehicles were identified on 7 January; one was salvaged that day and the second three days later. Another vehicle was found buried under rubble on 8 January.

A comprehensive survey of the wreck of Lake Illawarra was completed by 13 January. The divers operated in hazardous conditions, with little visibility and strong river currents, contending with bridge debris such as shattered concrete, reinforced steel rods, railings, pipes, lights, wire and power cables. Strong winds on the third day brought down debris from the bridge above, including power cables, endangering the divers working below.

== Victims ==
A total of twelve people died in the disaster: seven crew of Lake Illawarra and five motorists, one of whom was declared dead in 2015.

== Impact ==
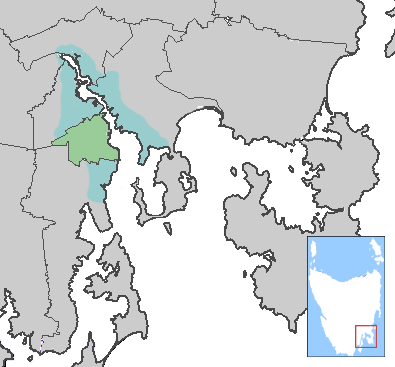
Geography of Hobart, showing the main part of the city on the west (green), and outer suburbs (blue)

=== Isolation ===
The collapse of Tasman Bridge isolated two sides of the city which had heavily relied upon it for most daily activities. 30% of Hobart's residents lived on the eastern shore and were effectively isolated. The day after the incident, as 30,000 residents set out for work, they found that the former three-minute commute over the bridge had turned into a 90-minute trip.

People on the eastern shore quickly became isolated, as most schools, hospitals, businesses and government offices were located on the western shore. Prior to the disaster, many services on the eastern shore were severely lacking. Access to medical services in particular posed problems for residents in the east, as services consisted only of local clinics. Hobart's hospitals—the Royal Hobart Hospital and the Calvary Hospital—were located on the western shore. What was previously a short drive across the river became a 50 km (31 mi) trip via the estuary's other bridge in Bridgewater. Most of Hobart's cultural activities, such as theatres, cinemas, the museum and art gallery, restaurants, meeting places, lecture theatres and the botanical gardens, were located on the western shore.

=== Replacement ferries ===
Within an hour of the incident, the Sullivans Cove Ferry Company started services across the river, and continued its services throughout the night. Three private ferries were in place the next day while the Kosciusko, Lady Ferguson and Lady Wakehurst were loaned by the Public Transport Commission, Sydney. The MV Cartela, which operated excursions on the Derwent, was pressed into service as a cross-river ferry.

=== Social effects ===
The disaster caused a variety of social and psychological difficulties. Although comparatively minor in loss of life and damage, it presented a problem beyond the capacity of the community to resolve. The disaster had unique characteristics and occurred at a time when the effects of disasters on communities were not well understood. "Opportunities for the community to be involved in the response to the disaster and the physical restoration of infrastructure were minimal because of the nature of the event. It is likely that this lack of community involvement contributed to the enduring nature of the effects of the disaster on a number of individuals."

A study of police data found that in the six months after the disaster, crime rose 41% on the eastern shore, while the rate on the city's western side fell. Car theft rose almost 50% in the isolated community, and neighbourhood quarrels and complaints rose 300%. Frustration and anger was directed towards the transport services. Visible progress on restoration of the bridge was slow because of the need for extensive underwater surveys of debris and the time required for design of the rebuilding. "The ferry queues did however provide some assistance by providing a forum where people with much in common could vent their frustration." A sociological study described how the physical isolation led to debonding (the setting aside of bonds that constitute the fabric of normal social life). The loss of the Tasman Bridge in Hobart disconnected two parts of the city and had far-reaching effects on the people separated.

The disaster was a major contributor to ferry services being the lifeline for people needing to cross the river for daily work. Bob Clifford was the major operator of ferries at the time, and quickly built more of his small aluminium craft, using his company Sullivans Cove Ferry Company. He later went on to become the major Tasmanian shipbuilder with a firm which continues today, called Incat.

== Rebuilding ==
=== Repairing the bridge ===
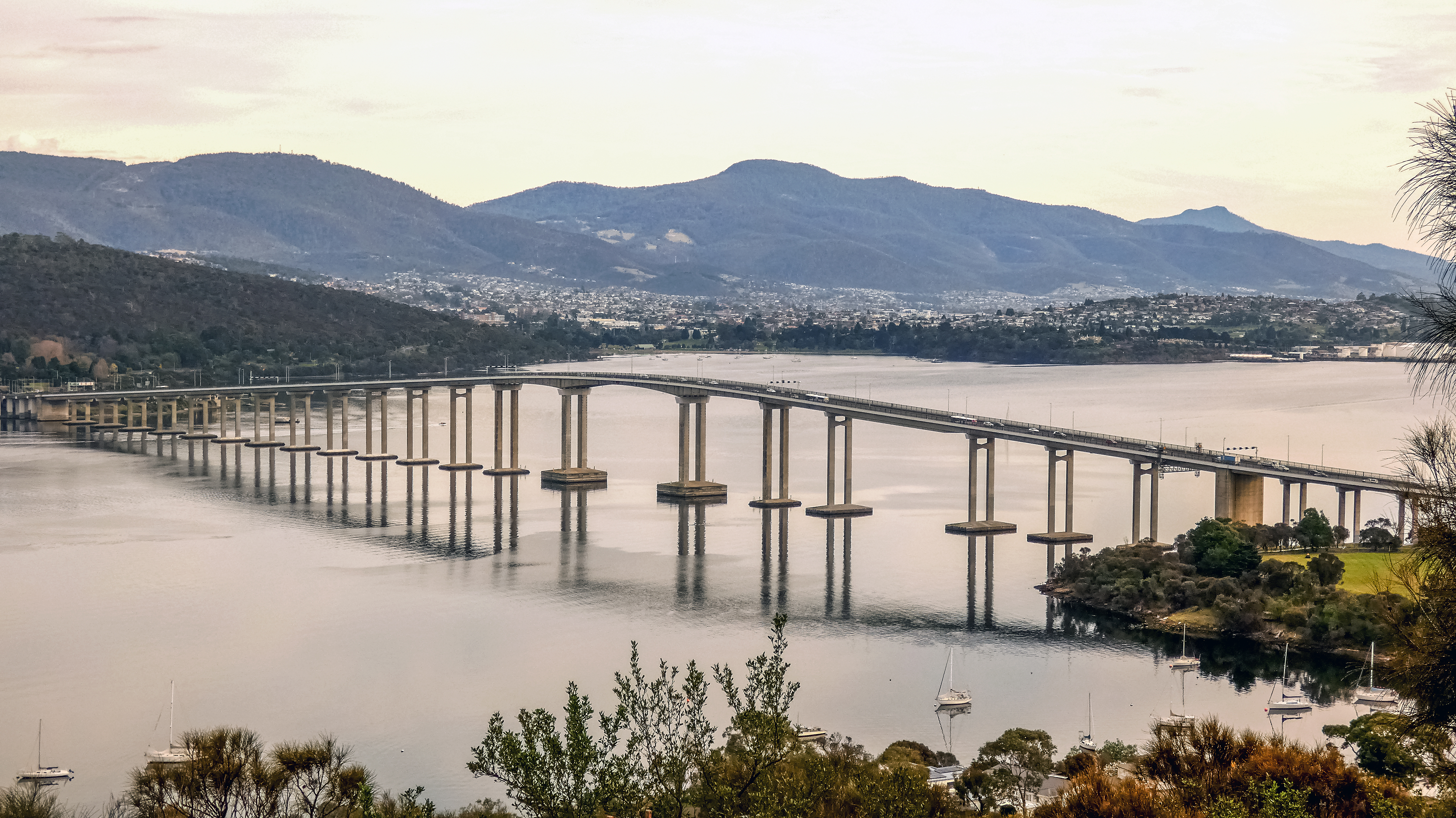
Tasman Bridge crossing the River Derwent at Hobart, pictured on 13 August 2024

In March 1975, a Joint Tasman Bridge Restoration Commission was appointed to restore the Tasman Bridge. The Federal Government agreed to fund the project, which began in October that year. The reconstruction included modification of the whole bridge to accommodate an extra traffic lane, allowing for a peak period 'tidal flow' system of three lanes for major flow and two for the minor flow. About a year after the bridge collapse, a temporary two lane Bailey bridge 788 m (2,585 ft) long, linking the eastern and western shores of the Derwent, was opened.

Specialists in marine engineering undertook an extensive investigation to locate bridge debris. This survey took several months to complete, and parts of the bridge weighing up to 500 tonnes (550 short tons; 1,100,000 lb) were accurately located using equipment developed by the University of Tasmania and the Public Works Department. Maunsell and Partners were appointed consultants for the rebuilding project. The firm John Holland was awarded the construction contract. Engineers decided not to replace pier 18 as there was too much debris on the site. Pier 17 on the western side of the gap was reinforced, and the pile cap and shaft of the pier above water level were replaced. A new pier was built at the site of the decimated Pier 19, and the existing Pier 20, on the eastern side of the gap, was repaired and strengthened. A new span, about 85.5 metres (281 ft) long, was built in steel box girder construction between piers 17 and 19, and another new, prestressed concrete span, about 42.5 metres (139 ft) long, was built from the new Pier 19 to Pier 20. The annual expenditures on the Tasman Bridge reconstruction were $1.7 m in 1974–75; $12.3 m in 1975–76; $13.2 m in 1976–77 and $6.1m in 1977–78.

The engineering design of the Tasman Bridge provided impact absorbing fendering to the pile caps of the main navigation span capable of withstanding a glancing collision by a large ship, but all other piers were unprotected. This disaster shares some common features with the Skyway Bridge collapse in Florida in 1980, the I-40 bridge disaster in Oklahoma in 2002, and the Francis Scott Key Bridge collapse in Baltimore in 2024, all three involving collisions with ships. When river traffic "comprises large vessels, even at low speed, the consequences of pier failure can be catastrophic". In the field of structural engineering, the concept of 'pier-redundant' bridges refers to a bridge superstructure which does not collapse when a single pier is removed. Two 'pier-redundant' bridges have been constructed in Australia – over the Murray River at Berri and at Hindmarsh Island in South Australia. The probability of ship impact is now regularly evaluated by specialist consultants when designing major bridges. One solution is to protect bridge piers through strengthening or the construction of impact-resistant barriers.

The disaster resulted in changes to the regulations pertaining to shipping movements on the River Derwent. In 1987, a system of sensors measuring river currents, tidal height, and wind speed was installed near the bridge to provide data for ship movements in the area. The Marine and Safety (Pilotage and Navigation) Regulations (2007) contains specific provisions dealing with the Bridge, e.g.:

The master of a vessel approaching the Bridge to navigate it through a span must (a) have the vessel fully under control; and (b) navigate the vessel with all possible care at the minimum speed required to pass safely under the bridge.

Vessels above a certain size are required to be piloted, and vehicle movements on the bridge are temporarily halted when large vessels are to pass underneath the bridge. As an added precaution, it is now mandatory for most large vessels to have a tug in attendance as they transit the bridge in the event that assistance with steerage may be required.

=== Development on the eastern shore ===
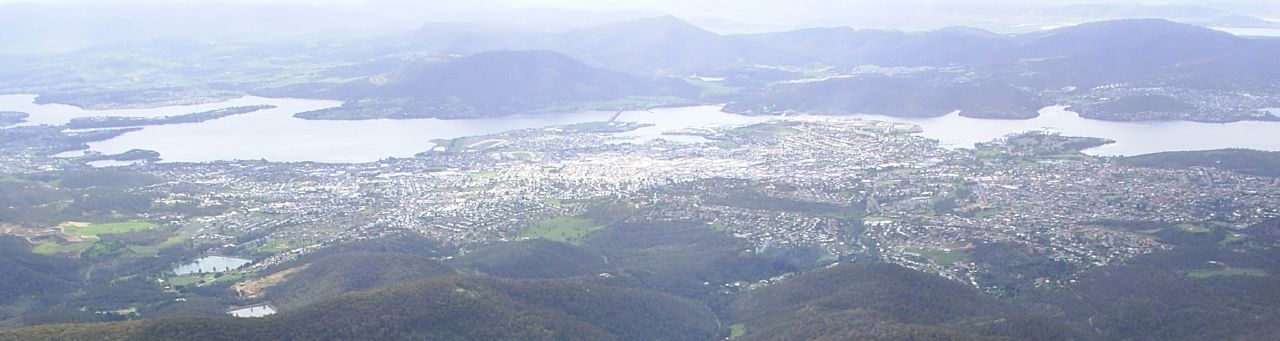
2005 panorama of Hobart's northern suburbs and the Bowen Bridge, illustrating the extent of the city's reliance on the Tasman Bridge

The disaster stimulated development in Kingborough, a municipality south of Hobart on the western shore, because of the reduced travel times for western shore workers compared to the eastern shore. The eastern shore eventually became a more self-contained community, with a higher level of employment and improved services and amenities, than had been the case prior to the disaster. The previous imbalance between facilities and employment opportunities was redressed as a result of the disaster.

A new bridge crossing the river, the Bowen Bridge, was completed in 1984, a few kilometres north of the Tasman Bridge.

== Memorial ==
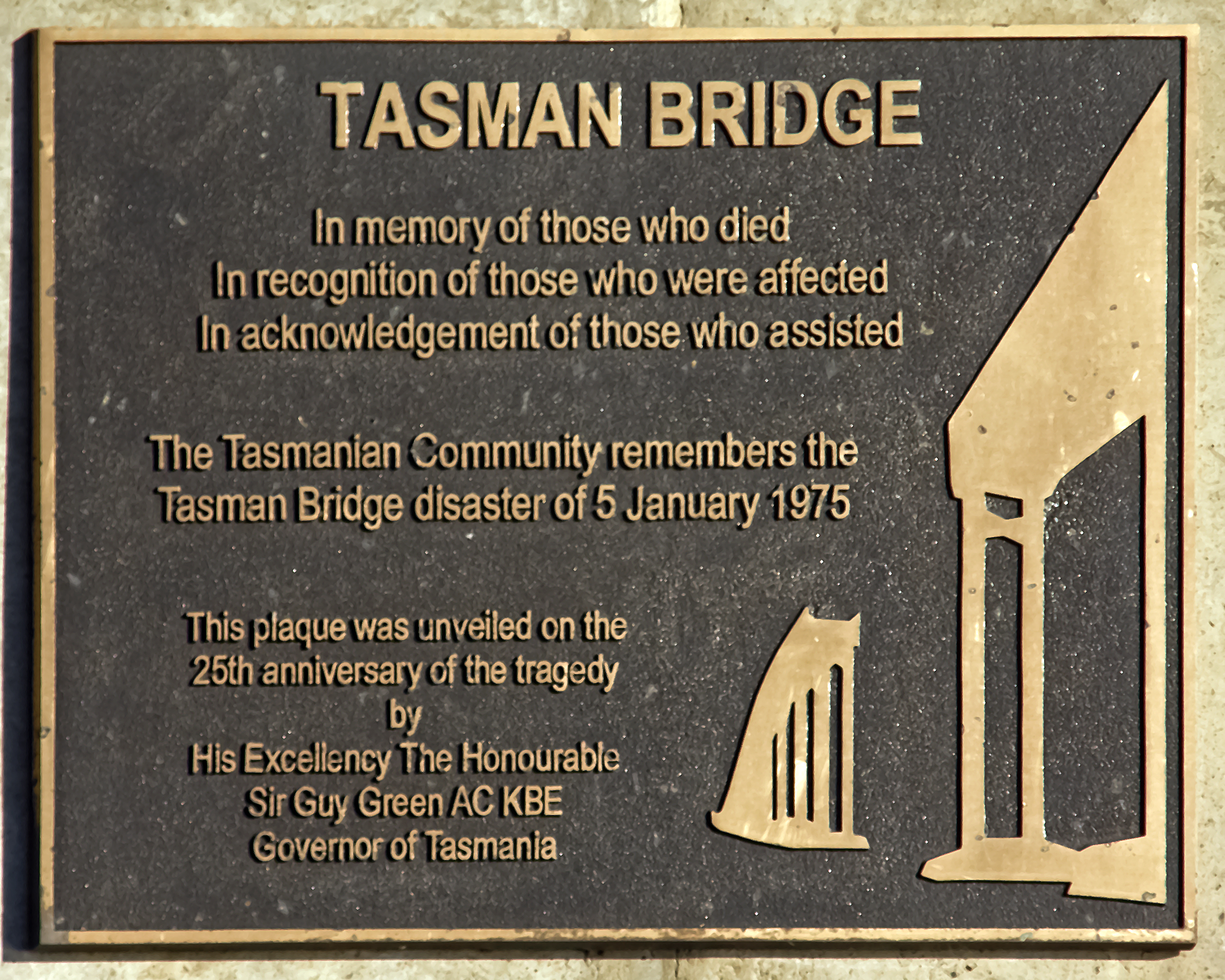
A plaque on the side of the eastern bridge support

A small service, led by members of the Tasmanian Council of Churches, was held on the occasion of the reopening on Saturday 8 October 1977. A large memorial service was eventually held 25 years after the disaster, in January 2000. In his address to the gathering, the Tasmanian Premier Jim Bacon stated that some people were still struggling with the memories of its effects, and he commended the resilience of the community in coping with the disaster. The Governor at the time, Sir Guy Green, described the pain and loss of loved ones and the social and economic disruption. He paid tribute to the efforts of emergency services personnel in responding to the disaster. He said that the "eastern shore had emerged more self-sufficient in the wake of the tragedy" and that "Tasmanians were now stronger, more self-reliant and mature". A plaque commemorating the tragedy was affixed to the main bridge support on the eastern shoreline.

== See also ==
- Francis Scott Key Bridge collapse — a similar incident in the US in 2024, caused by a container ship colliding with a bridge support
- Sunshine Skyway Bridge collapse — a similar incident in the US in 1980, caused by a bulk carrier colliding with a bridge support
- Almö Bridge Collapse — a similar incident in Sweden in 1980, caused by a bulk carrier colliding with a bridge support
- List of bridge failures
