= Thumbelina (disambiguation) =

Thumbelina is a Danish fairy tale by Hans Christian Andersen, first published in 1835.

Thumbelina may also refer to:

== Films ==
- Thumbelina (1964 film), a Russian animated film produced by Soyuzmultfilm
- Thumbelina (1970 film), 1970 American film by Barry Mahon
- Thumbelina (1978 film), a Japanese anime film produced by Toei Animation
- Thumbelina (1993 film), an Australian animated film produced by Burbank Animation Studios
- Thumbelina (1994 film), a 1994 animated film directed by Don Bluth, also based on the Andersen tale
- The Adventures of Tom Thumb and Thumbelina, a 2002 animated film directed by Glenn Chaika
- Barbie Presents: Thumbelina, a 2009 animated film inspired by the fairy tale with Barbie as the lead role

== Television ==
- "Thumbelina" (Faerie Tale Theatre), an episode of Faerie Tale Theatre
- Thumbelina: A Magical Story, a Japanese anime television series later edited into an eighty-minute film

== Music ==
- Thumbelina (soundtrack), the soundtrack to the 1994 Don Bluth film, or the title track
- "Thumbelina" (Frank Loesser song), a song from Hans Christian Andersen, a 1952 Hollywood musical film
- "Thumbelina", a song by The Pretenders from their 1984 album Learning to Crawl
- "Thumbelina", a song by Tracy Bonham from the 2000 album Down Here
- "Thumbelina", a song by Nightmare of You from the 2005 album Nightmare of You

== In nature ==
- Thumbelina (horse), born 2001, currently the world's smallest horse
- Thumbelina, one of the Canadian Parliamentary Cats
- Thumbelina triggerplant (Stylidium pulchellum), a species of Stylidium

== Other ==
- Thumbelina (comics), a mutant super villain in the Marvel Comics universe most well known as a member of the Mutant Liberation Front
- Thumbprint cookie, a type of fruit preserves-filled cookie, also known as a thumbelina cookie

== See also ==
- Tom Thumb (disambiguation)
