= SS Lake Illawarra =

Bulk ore carrier which collided with the Tasman Bridge in 1975

Coordinates: 42°51′52″S 147°20′45″E

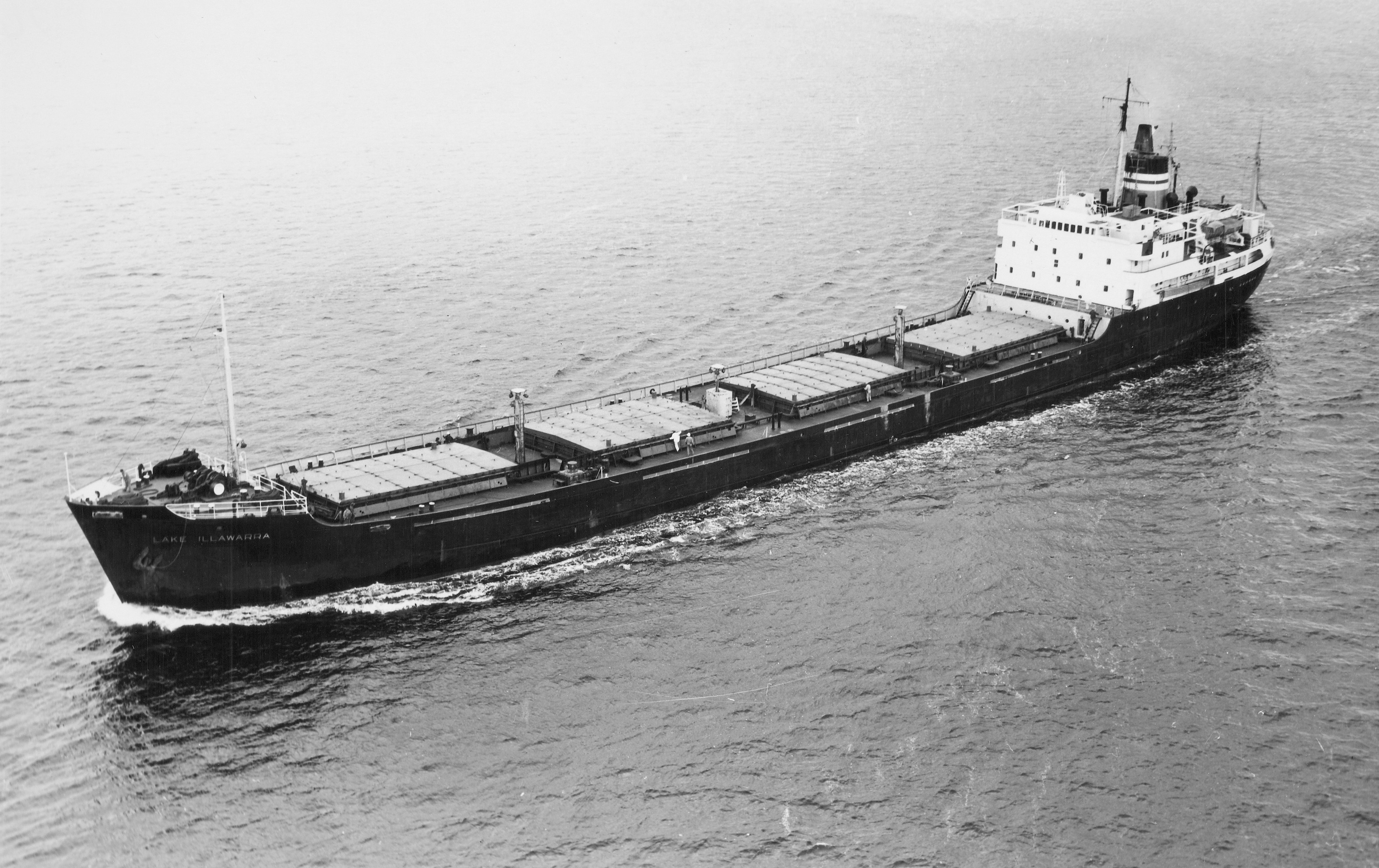
- Lake Illawarra

History

Australia
- Name: Lake Illawarra
- Namesake: Lake Illawarra
- Operator: Australian National Line
- Builder: BHP, Whyalla
- Launched: 1958
- Out of service: 1975
- Fate: Sank after colliding with Tasman Bridge, Hobart on 5 January 1975

General characteristics
- Type: Steel bulk ore carrier
- Tonnage: 7,274 GRT
- Length: 139.8 m (458 ft 8 in)
- Beam: 18 m (59 ft 1 in)
- Propulsion: Steam turbine
- Speed: 12 knots (22 km/h; 14 mph)

Lake Illawarra was a handysize bulk carrier of 7,274 tons in the service of the Australian National Line. This ship is known for causing the Tasman Bridge disaster when she collided with pylon 19 of Hobart's giant high concrete arch style Tasman Bridge on the evening of 5 January 1975 resulting in the deaths of 12 people.

== Ship details ==
Lake Illawarra was built by BHP, Whyalla, South Australia. Her keel was laid in June 1956, and she was launched on 28 September 1957. She was delivered from the shipyard on 28 March 1958. Lake Illawarra measured 7,274 gross register tons (GRT) and 10,380 tons deadweight (DWT), with a length of 139.8 metres (458 ft 8 in) and a beam of 18 metres (59 ft 1 in). She was powered by a steam turbine that drove a single propeller and gave her a speed of 12.5 knots (23.2 km/h; 14.4 mph).

== Collision and sinking ==
Lake Illawarra was loaded with zinc concentrate, for EZ Industries' Risdon Zinc Works, about three nautical miles (5.6 km; 3.5 mi) up the River Derwent from the bridge.

Just before the impact, Captain Bolesław Pelc realised as he passed Rosny Point that he was off course, and traveling too fast. He tried to correct the heading, but managed only to bring the bow too far to port (left) and was now heading for the western shore. He urgently counter-corrected, but could not make the opening. Realising he was headed for a collision, he ordered the engine full astern, but the torque from her propeller caused the ship to slide in a broadside movement. She smashed into the 18th and 19th pylons.

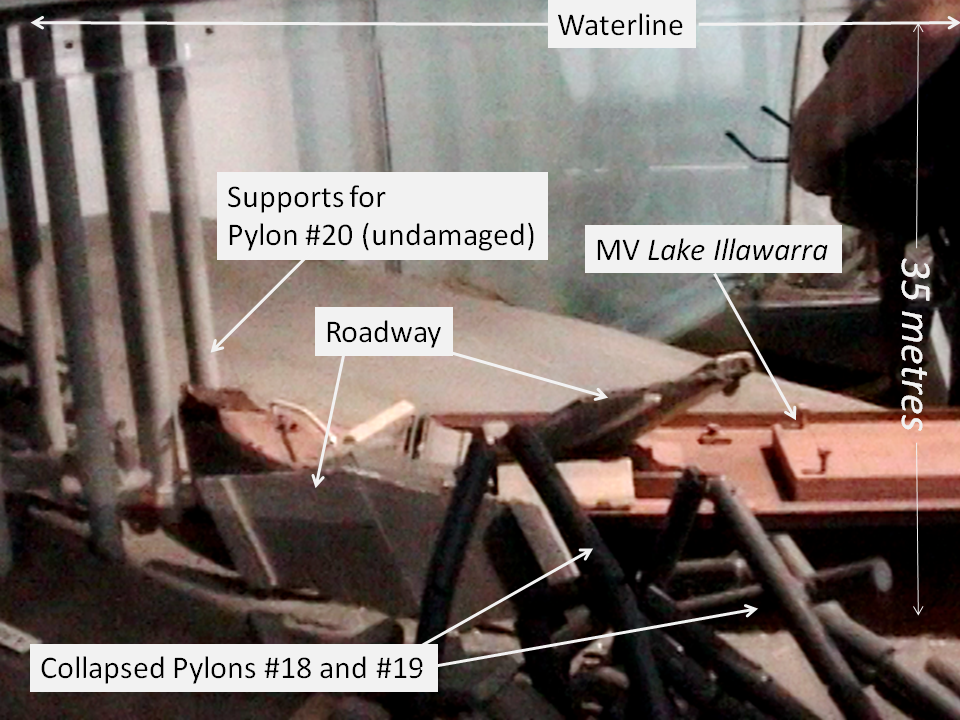
Model showing the submerged wreck and bridge debris

The collision brought down the two support pylons and a 127-metre (417 ft) section of steel and concrete. There was evening traffic on the bridge, and although no vehicles were on the section that fell, four cars drove off the gap, with five people killed. Two cars stopped on the edge, their occupants able to escape. The section of four-lane highway landed on the ship's deck, sinking her in 35 metres (115 ft) of water to the south of the bridge. Seven of the ship's crew died in the accident.

The ship and the debris pile were deemed unsafe to move; the ship's bunker oil was pumped out, and the bow was removed at a later date. The wreck is deep enough not to be a navigational hazard.

The subsequent Court of Marine Inquiry found that Lake Illawarra was capable of passing beneath the bridge's central navigation span, but the captain instead attempted to pass through one of the eastern spans, due to a combination of strong tidal currents and inattention. The Court found that Pelc had not handled Lake Illawarra in a proper and seamanlike manner, and suspended his master's certificate for six months. A pilot service was introduced in response to the court's findings.

== Memorial ==
A memorial plaque is dedicated to the SS Lake Illawarra at the Tasmanian Seafarers Memorial at Triabunna on the east coast of Tasmania, approximately 80 kilometres (50 mi) north-east of Hobart.
