= Hippolyte Rocks =

Island in Australia

Coordinates: 43°07′S 148°03′E

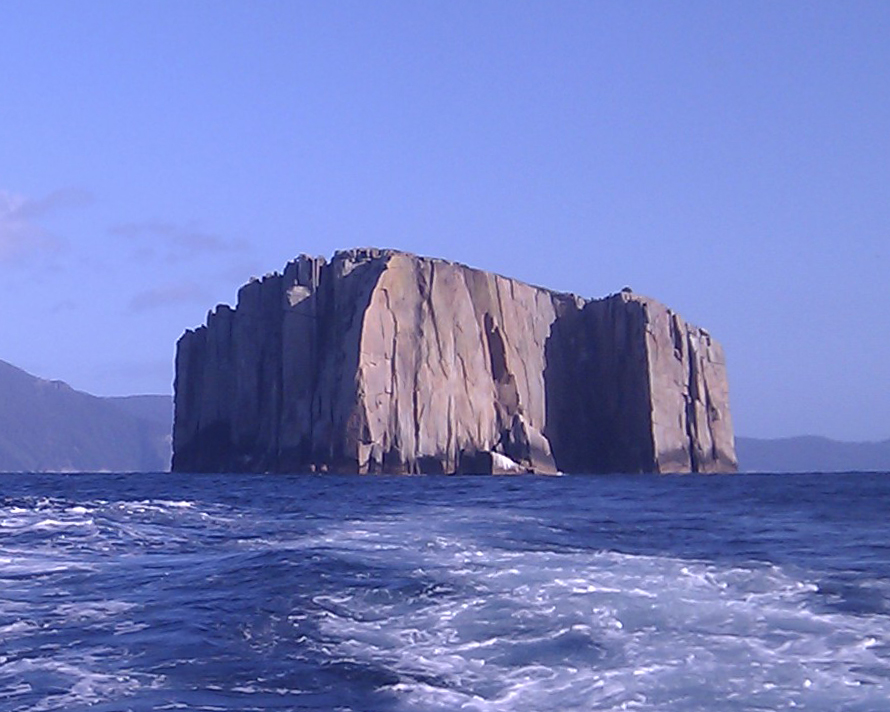

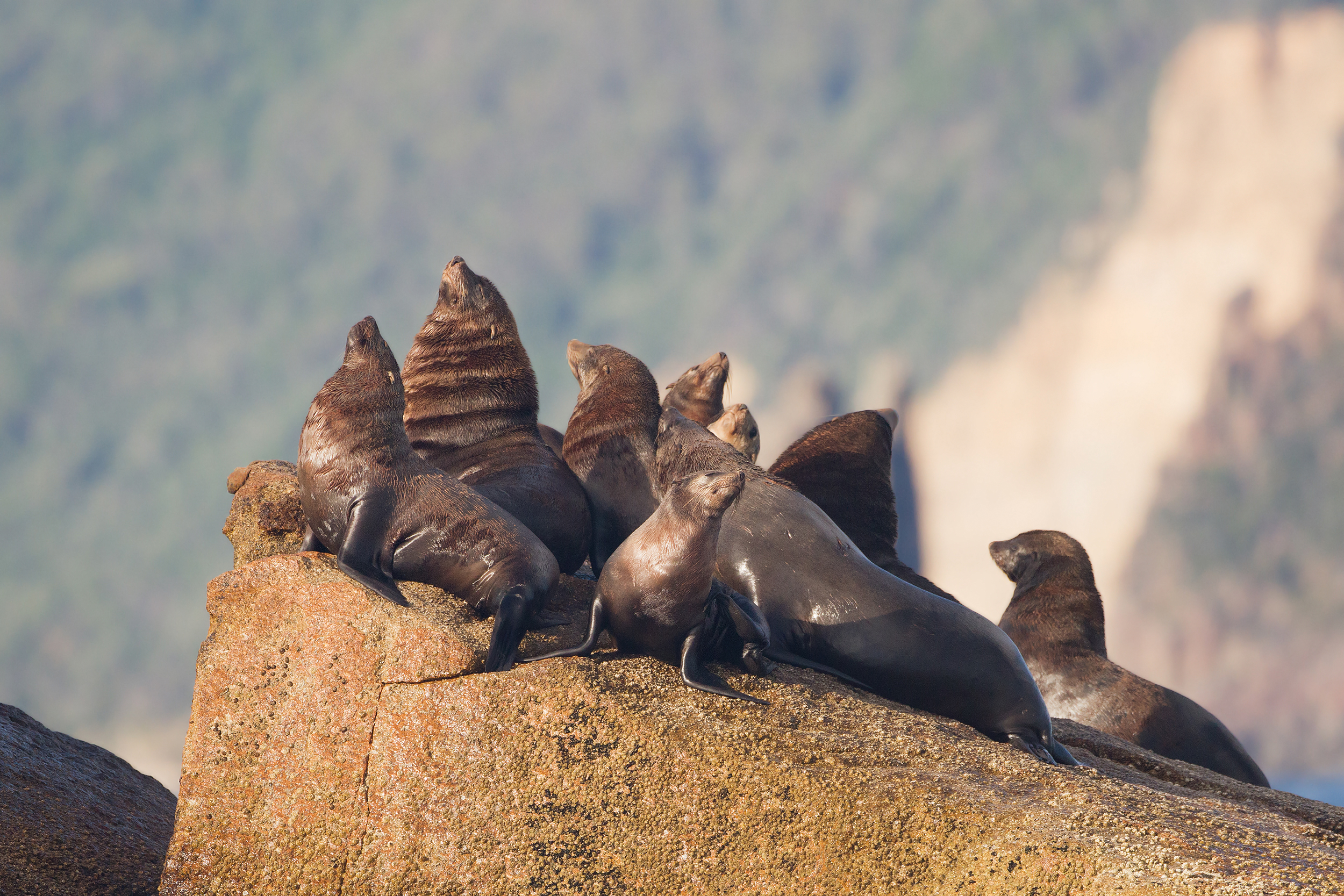
Brown fur seals hauling-out on the Hippolyte Rocks off the east coast of Tasmania, Australia

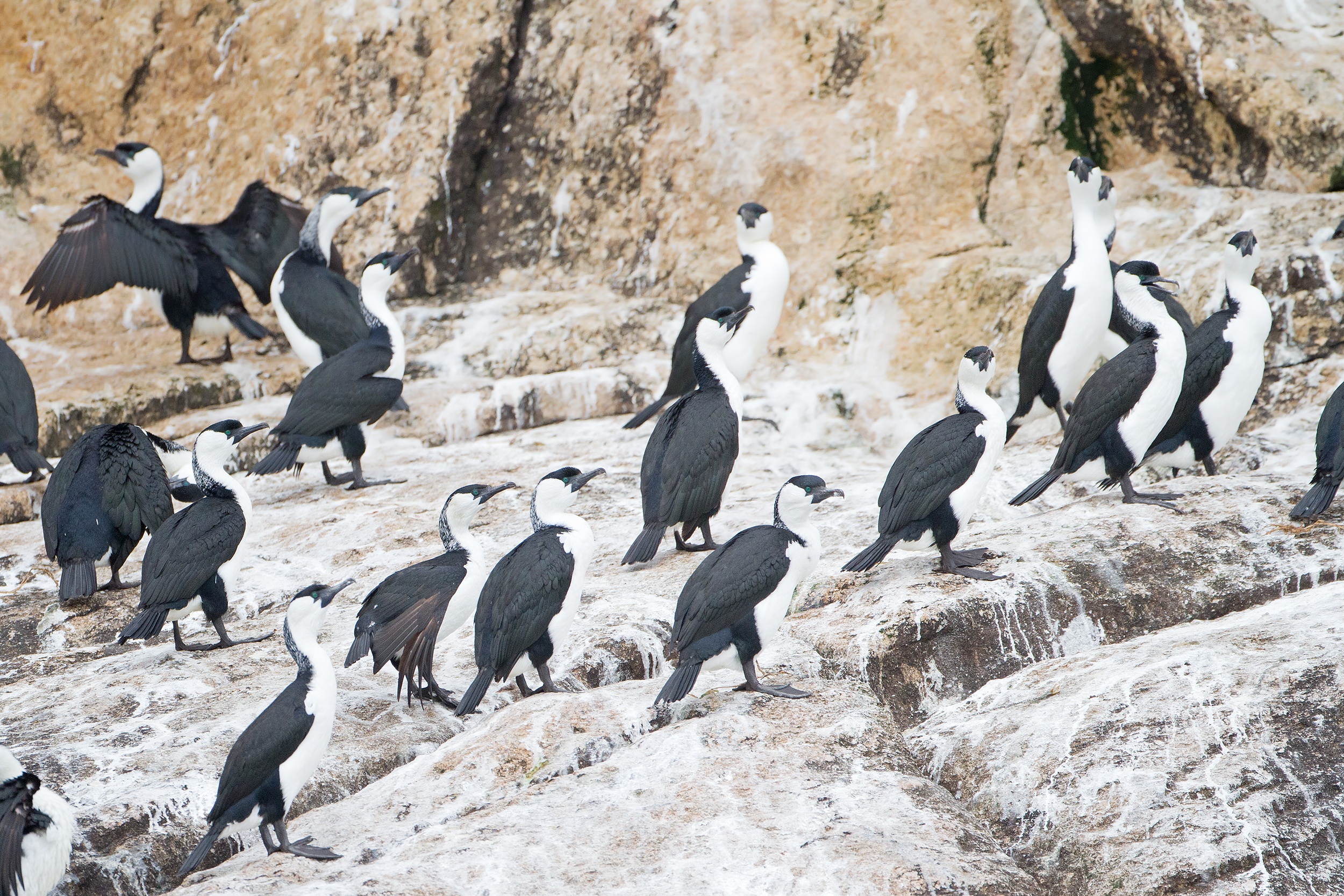
The IBA is an important breeding site for black-faced cormorants.

Hippolyte Rocks consists of a small granite island with an area of 5.3 ha ("Big Hippolyte", or "Greater Hippolyte"), and adjacent rocks and reefs ("Little Hippolyte" or "Lesser Hippolyte"; the Needle, and the Pie), in south-eastern Australia. They are part of the Tasman Island Group, lying close to the south-eastern coast of Tasmania around the Tasman Peninsula. The island has a flat top and is surrounded by steep cliffs up to 65 m (213 ft) in height, and is part of the Tasman National Park.

The waters surrounding the islands, including the nearby Trident Reef, are part of the Great Southern Reef, and have been described as being the best, though among the most challenging, dive sites in Tasmania. There are two shipwrecks between the Hippolytes, including the 1883 Tasman, which lies at a depth of 70 metres (230 ft), and the 1915 Nord, which lies at a depth of 40 metres (130 ft).

== Fauna ==
Recorded breeding seabird species are little penguin, short-tailed shearwater, sooty shearwater, fairy prion, common diving-petrel, silver gull and black-faced cormorant. Australian fur seals use the island as a haul-out site. The metallic skink is present. Together, Hippolyte rocks and the nearby Thumbs have been identified by BirdLife International as an Important Bird Area (IBA) because they support over 1% of the world population of black-faced cormorants.
