= George III (ship) =

British penal transportation convict ship

Coordinates: 43.51°S 146.98°E

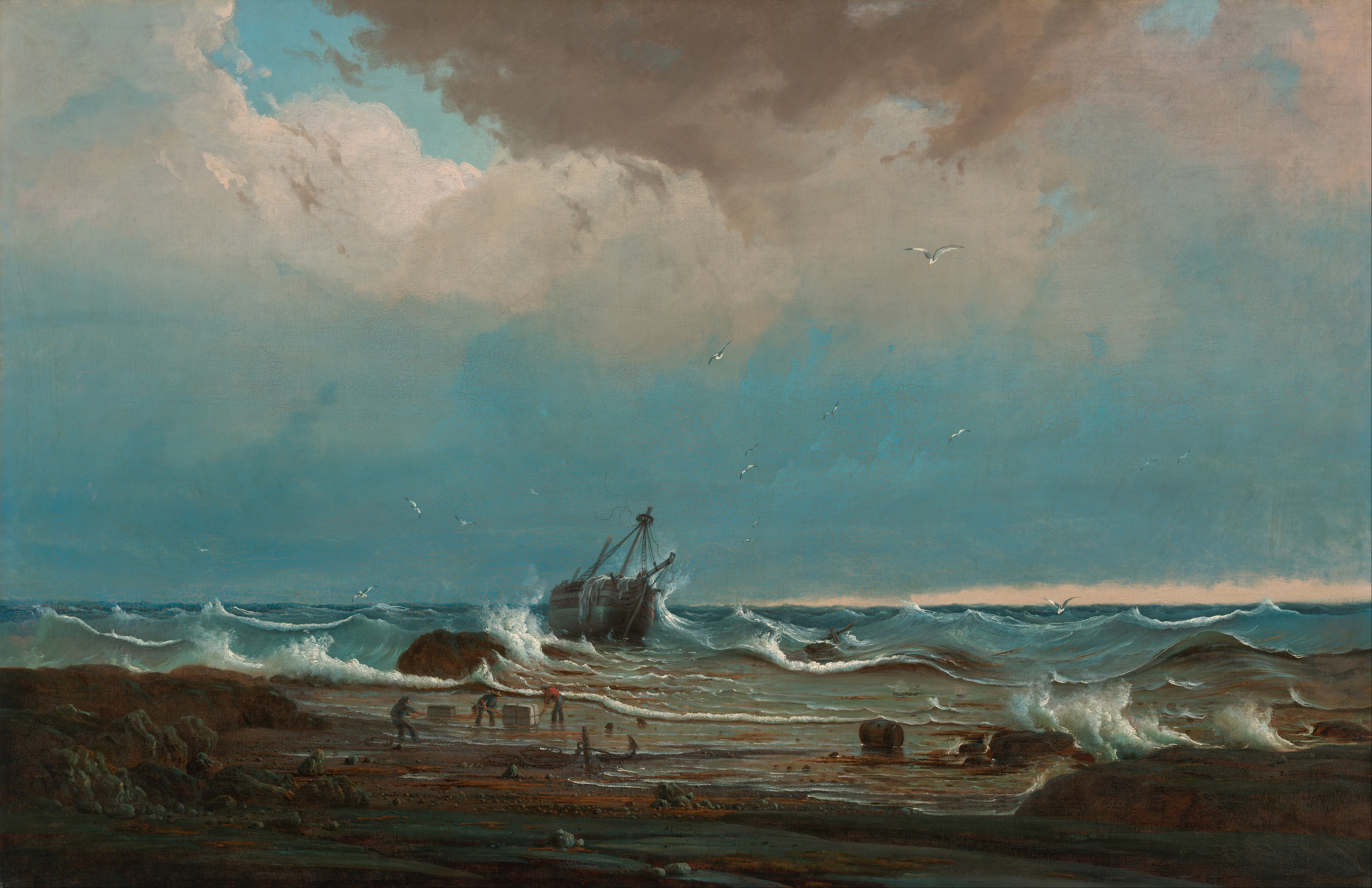
- The Wreck of George III, by Knud Bull

History

United Kingdom
- Name: George III
- Namesake: George III of the United Kingdom
- Owner: J. Heathorn and J. Poore in the mid-1830s.
- Builder: John Dudman & Co., Deptford, London
- Launched: 4 June 1810
- Home port: Port of London
- Fate: Wrecked 12 March 1835

General characteristics
- Tons burthen: 383, or 394, or 399, or 39918/94 (bm)
- Length: 114 ft (35 m)
- Beam: 28 ft 3 in (8.61 m)
- Sail plan: Full-rigged ship
- Crew: 35
- Armament: 16 × 12-pounder carronades

George III was a British penal transportation convict ship launched in 1810 in London. She was wrecked while transporting convicts from England to the Australian colonies. She was wrecked in the southern end of the D'Entrecasteaux Channel, Van Diemen's Land; 134 of the 294 people on board died.

== Career ==
Captain Alexander Scott acquired a letter of marque on 4 August 1810. George III entered Lloyd's Register (LR) in 1810 with Scott, master, Sir S. Clark, owner, and trade London–Jamaica.

Year	Master	Owner	Trade	Source & notes
1815	Malville	G.Knox & Co.	London transport	LR; damages repaired 1813
1820	S.Norton; Popplewell	G.Knox & Co.	London–Madeira	LR; damages repaired 1813
1825	Popplewell	Capt.&Co.	London-Jamaica	LR; damages repaired 1817 & 1824; repairs 1823
1830	Waterhouse	Popplewell	London-Jamaica	LR; damages repaired 1817 & 1824; repairs 1823

== Loss ==
George III sailed from Woolwich on 14 December 1834 for Hobart Town, Van Diemen's Land, under the command of Captain William Hall-Moxey, with a total of 308 persons on board. There were 220 male convicts, plus guards, their families, and crew. On 27 January 1835, a fire broke out while George III was nearing the equator. It was extinguished with only great difficulty and all on board were put on reduced rations as the fire had destroyed part of the ship's stores. An unbalanced diet caused an outbreak of scurvy and fourteen convicts died before the ship reached the coast of Van Diemen's Land on the morning of 12 March 1835.

To avoid being blown offshore and thus delaying arriving in Hobart Town, the master decided to enter the tortuous D'Entrecasteaux Channel between Bruny Island and the Tasmanian mainland. At about 9.15 pm that evening George III hit a rock and over a period of several hours broke up in the heavy swell. The convicts were kept below to allow the women and children to be safely evacuated by the ship's boats. The guards fired their guns to quell rising panic; this gunfire is believed to have killed between one and three of the convicts. Many others drowned below decks, including many of the sick in their beds. One hundred and thirty three people died in the disaster, of whom 128 were convicts.

=== Inquiry ===
An inquiry refused to ascribe blame for the disaster. The disaster did, however, result in renewed efforts to accurately prepare nautical charts of the Tasmanian coast so that mariners were warned of its many hazards to shipping, and the tightening up of regulations concerning provisions for the transport of convicts.

The tragedy of George III and others in the vicinity led to calls for a light to assist mariners navigate through the area. The result was the Cape Bruny Lighthouse which was completed in 1838.

=== Legend ===
Local beliefs are that convicts were released into the sea and shot by the ship's officers, "A ten-year-old cabin boy was saved by the captain's wife who hid him under her dress. He was the only convict who survived the wreck." It seems this story is a verbal history artefact conflating various elements such as a lithograph of the wreck. Many former convicts settled in this part of Tasmania and the local legend would have been coloured by their attitudes.

"Forty Juveniles were among the 220 convicts, but the Captain's wife was not on board the ship." More than likely this part of the legend relates to a painting by H. E. Dawes, which was also produced as a lithograph, depicting a soldier's wife, Mrs Martin, heroically described:

"She contrived to secure herself on the forechannel of the ship among the Laniards and although the sea ran mountains high with frost and rain the poor creature was exposed for 48 hours to the weather with two babes suckling at her bosoms and her elder child held between her knees."

The lithograph is also inaccurate in that all the survivors had been rescued by the next morning, rather than "48 hours". George III had been anchored after it hit a submerged rock, the ship was lying on its side in shallow water with the survivors perched on the high side. The ship's longboat made two trips to shore and the schooner Louisa arrived from Hobart Town, alerted by the ship's cutter which had been sent by Captain Moxey to get help. The lithograph, too, is a verbal history artefact with typical melodrama.

=== Memorial ===
A memorial plaque is dedicated to George III at the Tasmanian Seafarers' Memorial at Triabunna on the east coast of Tasmania, approximately 80 kilometres (50 mi) north-east of Hobart.

The plaque contains the following text:

George III

Convict ship of 308 tons left England
14/12/1834 with 34 crew, 200 convicts
and 29 soldiers of the 50th Regiment.
After 118 days, 16 dead, 60 had scurvy.
Then 10.4.1835 struck submerged rocks
in D'Entrecasteaux Channel, V.D.L.
resulting in the loss of 134 souls.

There is also a tourist sign at Southport which has recently been updated as an Australian Government initiative. Previously a sign here alleged a massacre of convicts by ships officers. The new sign states: "Despite much public disquiet and allegations in the press, an enquiry into the circumstances of the wreck and the alleged shootings failed to prove any wrong-doing".

Another monument is to be found at Southport Bluff, accessible by Ida Bay railway and then a walking path (three hours return). Due to conservation concerns this monument can not currently be visited.
