= The Thumbs (Tasmania) =

Coordinates: 43°06′S 147°58′E

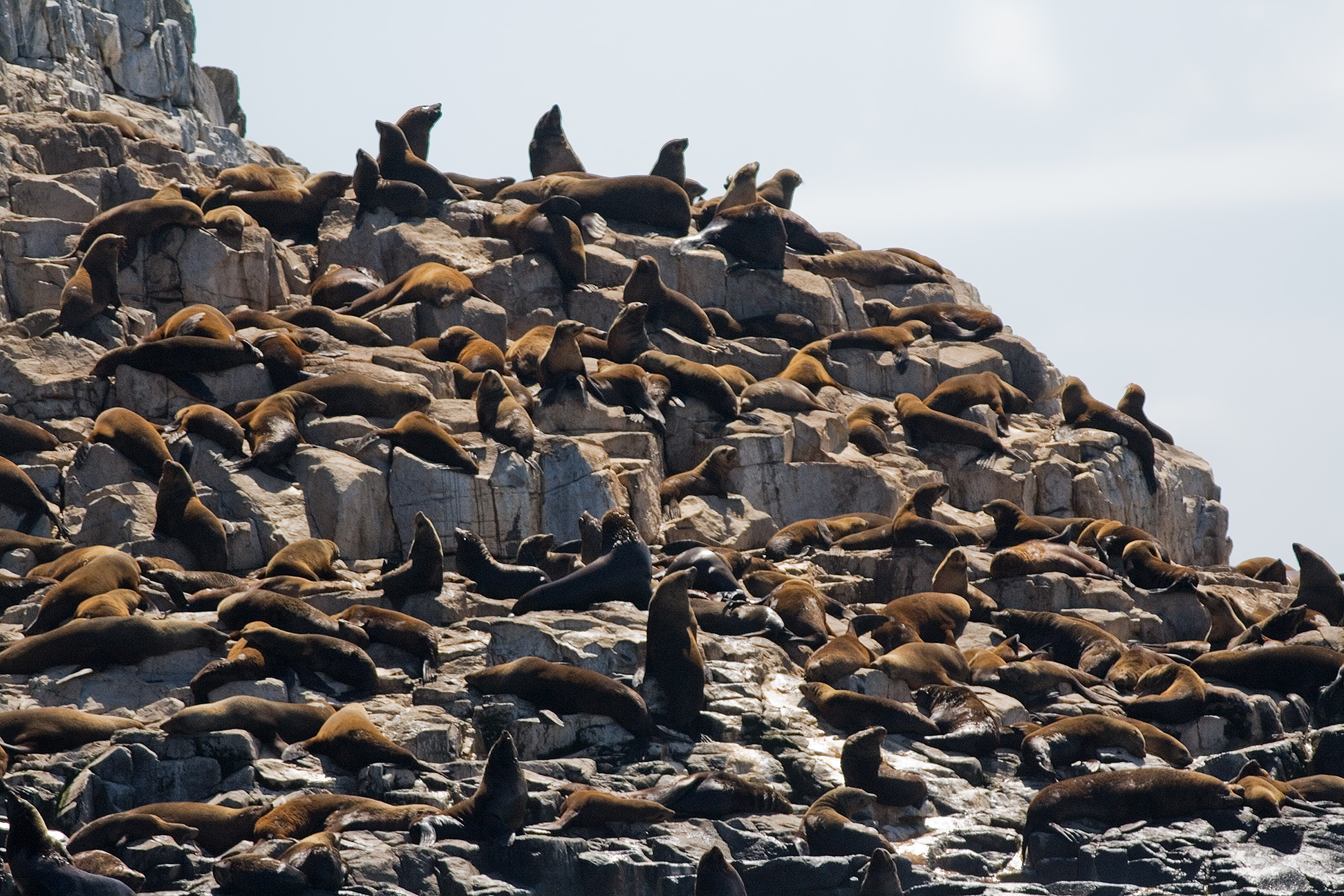
The site is used by Australian fur seals for hauling out

The Thumbs is a small and jagged island, with three prominent spires and an area of 4,500 square metres (1.1 acres), in south-eastern Australia. It is part of the Tasman Island Group, lying close to the south-eastern coast of Tasmania around the Tasman Peninsula, and is in the Tasman National Park.

== Fauna ==
Recorded breeding seabird species are common diving-petrel and black-faced cormorant. Australian fur seals use the island as a haul-out site. Together, The Thumbs and the nearby Hippolyte Rocks have been identified by BirdLife International as an Important Bird Area (IBA) because they support over 1% of the world population of black-faced cormorants.
