= Tom Thumb House =

Tom Thumb House may refer to:

- Tom Thumb House (Norfolk, Connecticut), on the National Register of Historic Places listings in Litchfield County, Connecticut
- Tom Thumb House (Middleborough, Massachusetts), listed on the National Register of Historic Places in Plymouth County, Massachusetts
