= Cataraqui (ship) =

British emigrant ship wrecked in 1845

Coordinates: 40°1′37.7″S 143°52′49.6″E

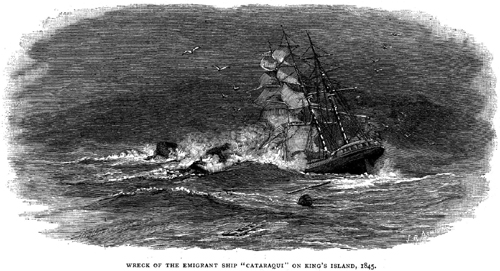
- Wreck of the emigrant ship Cataraqui, 1845

History

United Kingdom
- Name: Cataraqui (Cataraque)
- Owner: Smith & Sons, Liverpool, England
- Builder: Williams Lampson, Quebec, Lower Canada
- Launched: 1840
- Fate: Wrecked in Bass Strait, off King Island, Aug. 4, 1845

General characteristics
- Class & type: Emigrant ship
- Tons burthen: 802 tons NM; 712 tons OM
- Length: 138 feet (42 metres)
- Beam: 30 feet (9 metres)
- Draught: 22 feet (7 metres)
- Sail plan: Barque

Cataraqui (also called Cataraque) was a British barque which sank off the south-west coast of King Island in Bass Strait on 4 August 1845. The sinking was Australia's worst–ever maritime civil disaster incident, claiming the lives of 400 people.

== Construction and technical details ==
Cataraqui was an 802 ton barque, of dimensions 138 × 30 × 22 feet (42 × 9 × 7 metres). The ship was built in Quebec, Lower Canada in 1840 by the shipwrights Williams Lampson. The name Cataraqui comes from the French transliteration of "Katerokwi", the original Mississaugas First Nation name for the area now known as Kingston, Ontario.

== Voyage to Australia ==
Cataraqui was purchased and registered in Liverpool, England by Smith & Sons, for the purpose of transporting assisted emigrants to Port Phillip in the Colony of New South Wales (now Victoria, Australia).

On 20 April 1845, the ship sailed from Liverpool under the command of Captain Christopher Finlay. The ship's manifest on departure included 369 emigrants and 41 crew (410 total, including the captain). The voyage was fairly uneventful apart from the loss of a crew member overboard. By the time the vessel neared Australia, five babies had been born and six others had died.

== Sinking ==
As Cataraqui entered Bass Strait in the early morning of 4 August, she encountered a severe storm. At about 04.30 hours, the ship was cast suddenly onto jagged rocks just off Fitzmaurice Bay on King Island off the north-western coast of Tasmania. Attempts to evacuate the ship were hindered by the large waves and heavy weather which washed many of the ship's occupants overboard. Eight crewmen managed to reach the shore by clinging to floating wreckage, where they encountered the only emigrant survivor, Solomon Brown. The nine castaways were stranded on King Island for five weeks until they were rescued by the cutter Midge and taken to Melbourne. 314 recovered bodies were buried on King Island in five graves.

== Memorial ==
A memorial plaque is dedicated to the Cataraqui at the Tasmanian Seafarers' Memorial at Triabunna on the east coast of Tasmania.

The plaque contains the following text:

Cataraqui

Built Quebec 1840, 802 T. 138 x 30 x 22 ft.
Left Liverpool, England 20.4.1845 for
Melbourne - Capt. C.Finlay, 43 crew
367 assisted emigrants (173 under 15).
Enroute 5 babies born, 6 babies died,
1 seaman drowned thus 409 aboard when
wrecked 4.8.1845 off W. coast King Is.
1 emigrant, 8 crew survived, 400 lost.

~ Tasmania's worst shipwreck ~

== See also ==
- Immigration history of Australia
- List of disasters in Australia by death toll
- Lemon, Andrew & Morgan, Marjorie (1995). Poor souls, they perished: the Cataraqui, Australia's worst shipwreck. Collingwood, Vic, Australian Scholarly Pub. ISBN 1-875606-26-2. OCLC: 36986583.
