= Tom Thumb Gallery =

Art gallery in Kirksville, Missouri

The Tom Thumb Annual Floating Art Exhibition, founded in 1998, by Jimmy Kuehnle and Kjell Hahn is a student-run alternative exhibition opportunity located in Kirksville, Missouri. It is one of two alternative exhibition opportunities from the gallery at Truman State University. The second is Gallery 1/33.

== History ==
The Tom Thumb Annual Floating Art Exhibition was founded to provide exhibition opportunities for students and artists at Truman State University and Kirksville. It rose out of a frustration with Truman State Gallery's Student Juried Exhibition and the lack of student exhibition opportunists outside the BFA shows and the then annual Student Show. Kuehnle and Kjell did not like the standards and restrictions placed on them by the University. They decided to begin their own alternative space. In 1998, they cleared out Kjell's apartment and held an open art submission. The following three years the shows were held there. It then moved to a renovated home located at 603 First Street for the next two years. Since it has been held at various locations including the former Aquadome, the old One World Store, the Kirksville Arts Association and the Washington School. Local people call it a "floating exhibition" because of these yearly venue changes. The Tom Thumb Annual Floating Art Exhibition does not reject submissions of any kind and usually features a guest speaker and other forms of entertainment. One such novelty is called, "Improve the Art" and consists of a poor artwork provided by the gallery. Guests are then invited to "improve" the artwork with various art supplies ranging from oil pastels to spray paint.

== Exhibitions ==
- Tom Thumb I was held on September 12, 1998 at Fair Apartments #13. The theme was "2001: An Art Odyssey." Marc Whelchel was the guest speaker and was arrested by guest, Phil Schiff, during his speech. The first exhibition also unveiled what would later be a staple of the Tom Thumb, "Improve the Art."
- Tom Thumb II was held on October 30, 1998. Terry Lewis was the guest speaker. This Halloween themed event featured paper bat races.
- Tom Thumb III was held in the spring semester at Fair Apartments #13.
- Tom Thumb IV was held on September 29, 2000 and featured the pants-less guest speaker "Carlo Rossi" who gave his speech from the roof of the gallery. This exhibition, the first to be held at 603 First Street, featured outdoor ping-pong, a live violin performance, a controversial video installation, and an outdoor session of "improve the art" on the garage.
- Tom Thumb V was held on February 23, 2001 with the theme "Chaos and Fun" which featured a 150 lb hog roast and an installation in the kitchen of the house. Trash and graffiti filled and covered all surfaces of the kitchen.
- Tom Thumb VI was held on October 26, 2001 and had the theme "Amerikan Pride." This event also featured the destruction of many television sets and other electronic equipment including micro-film machines and computers with sledge hammers.
- Tom Thumb VII was held on February 22, 2002 at the Aquadome. This event was organized by Mimi Kato. Co-founder, Jimmy Kuehnle, returned as the guest speaker. It also hosted a murder mystery maze through which all guests had to enter and a bowling alley.
- Tom Thumb VIII was held on April 30, 2004 to May 2, 2004 at One World Store. This event was organized and directed by Julia Karll and Joe Moccia and featured guest speaker, Paul Kingston, aka Paid Paul. Two Students were married in a "Fairy Wedding." The theme that year was "Tom Thumb. Bigger. Crazier. More."
- Tom Thumb IX and X were held in 2006 at the Washington School. This was the first Tom Thumb to be held at a non student controlled venue.
- Tom Thumb XI was held April 13, 2007 at the Kirksville Art Association. The intentional move from the Washington school kept the spirit of the "floating exhibition."
- Tom Thumb XII was organized by Zia Luehrman and held on April 11, 2008 at a student's home on Halliburtion and Patterson. Tom Thumb XII featured the relaunch of The Monitor, an alternative newspaper at Truman State University.
- Tom Thumb XIII was on April 3–4, 2009 at the Washington School and was themed "The Great Recessive Post-Apocalyptic Masquerade"
- Tom Thumb XIV was held on April 9–10, 2010 at The Aquadome. It was themed "The Bamboozlement of Franklin Pierce."
- Tom Thumb XV was held on April 8–9, 2011 at The Aquadome. The theme was "Quinceañera."
- Tom Thumb XVI was organized by Faith Martin and Allison Sissom and held at Pickler's Famous on April 13, 2012. The theme was "Kim Jong-il." The event included live music, comedians, and belly dancers. Renowned girl group, The Dee Dees, reunited for their "farewell" performance.
- Tom Thumb XVII was organized by Wes Harbison and Julie Davis and was held at The Aquadome on April 13, 2013. The theme was "Pulp Art." There was a real, officiated wedding; an "Improve the Art" section; and an art piece made from a car windshield. Acts included bands, improv, stand-up comedy, story-telling, and a one-man show.
- Tom Thumb XVIII was organized by Melanie Pailer, Lauren Kellett and Colleen Ryan and held at the Djinn Hookah Lounge on April 11 and 12 2014. The theme was "Not Another Tom Thumb." The event featured a gallery of over 50 pieces of artwork and over 20 performances over the course of two nights.
- Tom Thumb XIX was organized by Colleen Ryan and Rachel Hain and featured poster and T-shirt designs by Albert McCormick. It was held on April 25, 2015 at Manhattan Events. The theme was "George W. Bush Middle School Mixer: No Child Left Behind" and featured performance artists Eric Piper and Danny Gonzalez as they tattooed each other while blindfolded.
- Tom Thumb XX was organized by Rachel Hain and Alex Wennerberg. Posters were designed and printed by Albert McCormick. T-shirts were designed by Blake Buthod. The theme was XX(L), encouraging extra large submissions. Tom Thumb XX was held on April 15 and 16 2016 at The Aquadome, featuring over 20 performers. Among the performers were poetry readings, comedy, and music from a variety of bands.
- Tom Thumb XXI was organized by Blake Buthod and Natalie Welch. Posters were designed and printed by Lisa Pockets. T-shirts were designed by Lisa Pockets and printed by Bad Acids. The theme was "Finally Legal." Tom Thumb XXI was held on April 7 and 8, 2017, at The Aquadome, featuring just over 20 performers. Among the performers were poetry readings, comedy, performance art, and music from an even mixture of local and Midwest artists.
- Tom Thumb XXII was organized by Sarah Connolly and Jackie Nobbe. The theme for the event was "Finally, Snacks!," which was inspired by a letter to future Tom Thumb organizers from Wes Harbison and Julie Davis (Tom Thumb XVII). Liam Connolly designed and printed T-shirts featuring snacks having a party. Tom Thumb XXII took place on April 27 and 28, 2018 at the Aquadome. Over 20 performers took part in the event, and their acts included music, poetry, comedy, and performance art. A fan-favorite event was an allegorical performance of a chicken seasoning and breading a cafeteria worker. Many snacks were available for the public to enjoy as they wandered through the gallery and watched acts.
- Tom Thumb XXIII was held on April 27, 2019 at the Washington School with permission of Charles Tharp. The theme was Y2K bash, and participants were invited to bring troublesome old electronics to destroy at midnight. Tom Thumb XXIII featured a friend marriage, haircut bingo, live ducklings, and performances from various musicians and poets.
- Tom Thumb XXIIV was organized by Liam Connolly, Lesley Hauck, and Meredith Harrach. The gallery took place virtually April 4, 2020 due to the coronavirus pandemic. The theme was Lost in Mirrorland. Performers livestreamed their music, poetry, and performances from places such as Columbia, MO, Kirksville, St. Louis, and Iowa City, IA. Spectators from many more locations tuned in. An open zoom-dinner with toasts were also held in the middle. Art was emailed in and displayed in a virtual gallery google-slide presentation.

== Significance in local culture ==
The rotating arts festival has been featured in Missouri tourism brochures. The Tom Thumb Annual Floating Art Exhibition is viewed by the student body as a positive creative outlet to be proud of and as an alternative to destructive outbursts such as graffiti. A college blogger has critically noted that the phrasing "Floating Art Exhibition" may be misleading, since the gallery is not restricted to art that may be suspended in air or bobbing in some body of water.
