= Court of Marine Inquiry =

Courts of Marine Inquiry and Boards of Marine Inquiry are tribunals established in common law countries to investigate matters relating to shipwrecks, casualties affecting ships, or charges of incompetency or misconduct on the part of the masters, mates or engineers of ships.

== Australia ==
Various tribunals are established in Australia to investigate the causes of shipwrecks, crashes and other matters pertaining to ships in Australian waters. As Australia is a federal jurisdiction, both the States of Australia and the National government have joint authority to make laws over navigation. Where navigation relates to overseas or interstate trade, the national government's law will take precedence in certain circumstances.

At the national level, the Australian Government has established the Court of Marine Inquiry of Australia under the federal Navigation Act.

At the state level, the following agencies have responsibility for the investigation of maritime incidents:

- In New South Wales a District Court may be authorised to sit as a Court of Marine Inquiry to hear and determine inquiries, appeals, and references under the New South Wales Navigation Act 1901. Decisions of such a Court are not subject to review by courts of appeal. The NSW Maritime Authority has responsibility for marine incident investigation. The Authority investigates the causes of incidents involving shipping and commercial vessels and breaches of State or Commonwealth navigation laws. Incidents involving Sydney Ferries vessels are examined by the Office of Transport Safety Investigations, which is also responsible for investigations into incidents involving publicly owned rail and bus transport.
- The Western Australian Government has established the Magistrates Court of Western Australia as a court of marine inquiry.
- The Victorian Government has established the Marine Board of Victoria to perform the functions of a court of marine inquiry.

== Fiji ==
In Fiji, marine boards are established under the Marine Act to conduct enquiries.

== Tonga ==
Magistrates Courts of Tonga are courts of marine inquiry under the Tongan Shipping Act.

== Sources ==
- New South Wales State Archives
- Re Grounding of MV "TNT ALLTRANS" - (1986) 67 ALR 107
- Public Records Office, Victoria
- Western Australian Government
