= List of shipwrecks of Australia =

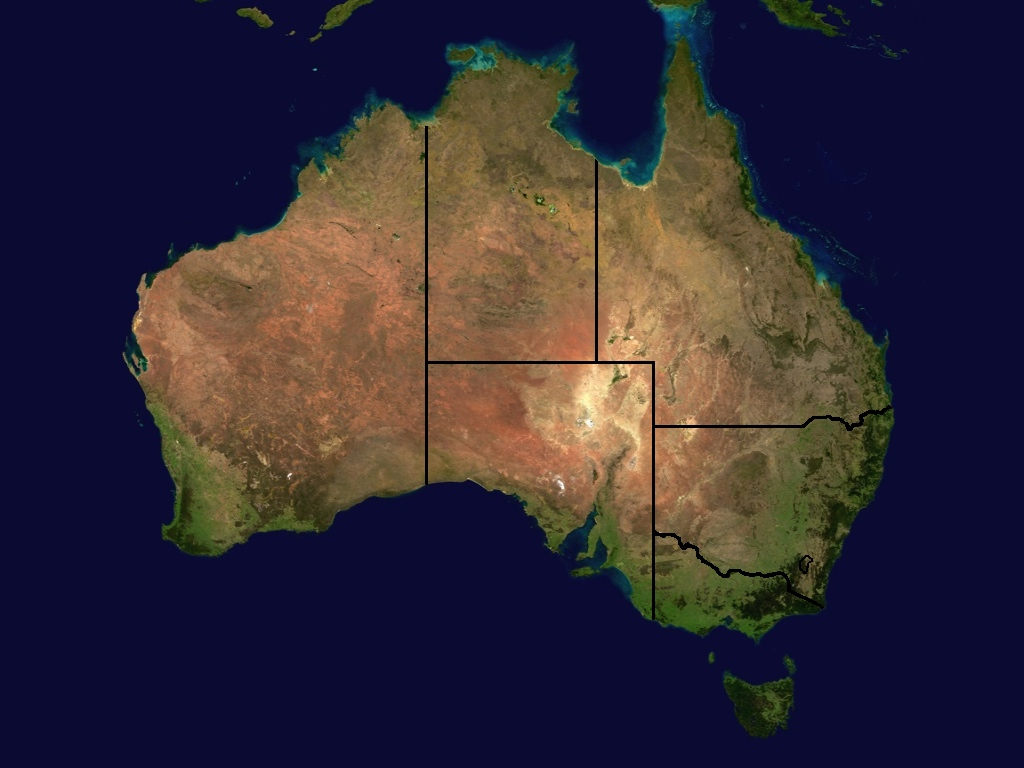
Satellite map of Australia with state borders

This is a list of shipwrecks located in Australia.

== New South Wales ==
| Ship | Flag | Sunk date | Notes | Coordinates |
|---|---|---|---|---|
| Abbey | New South Wales | 15 February 1868 | A brigantine that was wrecked in a storm at Crowdy Head | 31.84°S 152.76°E |
| Ability | New South Wales | 5 January 1897 | A ketch that ran aground at Cape Hawke | |
| Absalom | (United Kingdom of Great Britain and Ireland) New South Wales | 29 March 1863 | A ketch that was wrecked at Trial Bay | 30.83°S 153.01°E |
| Acielle | Australia | 11 September 1929 | A ketch that was driven ashore off Smoky Cape | 31.104078°S 153.024988°E |
| Active | (United Kingdom of Great Britain and Ireland) New South Wales | 18 February 1852 | A ketch that was wrecked at the mouth of the Hunter River | 32.92°S 151.79°E |
| Ada | Unknown | 29 April 1897 | A ketch that was wrecked off Newcastle | 32.92°S 151.79°E |
| Ada and Ethel | New South Wales | 26 October 1887 | A wooden schooner that sprung a leak and foundered off Seal Rocks | 32.6°S 152.7°E |
| Adelaide | (United Kingdom of Great Britain and Ireland) New South Wales | May 1834 | A wooden cutter wrecked near Norah Head | 33.23°S 151.60°E |
| HMAS Adelaide | Royal Australian Navy | 13 April 2011 | An Adelaide-class frigate that was scuttled as a dive wreck off Avoca Beach | 33°28′0″S 151°27′0″E |
| Adele | Royal Australian Navy | 7 May 1943 | A steamship that struck the breakwater at Port Kembla | 34.4678°S 150.9170°E |
| Adelphoi | New South Wales | 21 December 1879 | A barque that was wrecked off Port Hacking | 34.073°S 151.12°E |
| Adolphe | France | 30 September 1904 | Sailing ship wrecked at the mouth of Hunter River | 32°54′49.46″S 151°47′50.21″E |
| Adonis | New South Wales | 22 December 1889 | A brigantine that sank off Crowdy Head | 32.1°S 152.8°E |
| Advance (1874) | Australia | 12 June 1902 | A schooner that was wrecked at Botany Bay | 34.00°S 151.235°E |
| Advance (1884) | Australia | 25 December 1908 | An iron screw steamer that collided with the Inverna off Catherine Hill Bay | 33.1806°S 151.70328°E |
| Adventure | (United Kingdom of Great Britain and Ireland) New South Wales | 1855 | A schooner that was wrecked at Richmond River | 28.88°S 153.58°E |
| Aenid | (United Kingdom of Great Britain and Ireland) New South Wales | 12 November 1865 | A cutter that was wrecked at Long Reef | |
| Agnes (1849) | Canada | 10 March 1877 | A brigantine that was wrecked off Wollongong | |
| Agnes (1853) | (United Kingdom of Great Britain and Ireland) New South Wales | 13 July 1860 | A cutter that was blown ashore near Newcastle | 32.8°S 152°E |
| Agnes (1875) | New South Wales | 12 March 1890 | A schooner that was wrecked near Ocean Shores | 28.45°S 153.56°E |
| Agnes (1877) | New South Wales | 1883 | A ketch that was wrecked off Jervis Bay | 35.12°S 150.82°E |
| Agnes (1904) | Australia | 27 January 1906 | A launch that was wrecked in a collision in Sydney Harbour | 33.85°S 151.24°E |
| Agnes Irving | New South Wales | 28 December 1879 | A paddle steamer that was wrecked off Trial Bay | 30.806350°S 153.005007°E |
| Alhambra | New South Wales | 30 June 1888 | Iron screw steamer wrecked off Newcastle while attempting to move the derelict wreck of the John T. Berry | 32°53′S 151°54′E |
| Amy | New South Wales | 13 February 1898 | A brig wrecked during a gale off the beach at Thirroul | 34°18′55.5″S 150°55′50.4″E |
| HMAS Anzac | Royal Australian Navy | 7 May 1936 | A Parker-class destroyer leader that was sunk as a target off Sydney Heads | |
| Argument | (United Kingdom of Great Britain and Ireland) New South Wales | March 1809 | A sloop that was wrecked near Broken Bay | |
| HMAS Arunta | Royal Australian Navy | 12 February 1969 | A Tribal-class destroyer sold for scrap, but sank under tow off Sydney Heads | 33°50′S 151°19′E |
| HMAS Australia | Royal Australian Navy | 12 April 1924 | An Indefatigable-class battlecruiser that was scuttled off Sydney Heads | 33°51′54.21″S 155°44′25.11″E |
| Bantam | Netherlands | 24 September 1946 | A Dutch ship that was scuttled off Sydney | |
| Barcoo | Australia | 1 February 1924 | A passenger ship that was scuttled off Sydney Heads | |
| Bellubera | Australia | 1 August 1980 | A ferry that was scuttled southeast off Long Reef (New South Wales) | |
| Bluebell | Australia | 9 August 1934 | A ferry that collided with the Waraneen at Newcastle | |
| Bombo | Australia | 24 February 1949 | A coastal steamer that sank in a storm off Port Kembla | 34°26.775′S 151°55.48′E |
| Bonnie Dundee | New South Wales | 10 March 1879 | A steamship that collided with SS Barrabool off Caves Beach | 33°06.327′S 151°42.258′E |
| Brighton | Australia | 1916 | A ferry that was hulked at Port Stephens | 32.6684°S 152.1259°E |
| Britannia | United Kingdom | 25 August 1806 | A whaler that ran up against the Elizabeth and Middleton Reefs | |
| Buster | Australia | 17 February 1893 | A barquentine that ran aground at Woolgoolga | |
| Catterthun | New South Wales | 8 August 1895 | Hit rocks and sunk during a storm off Seal Rocks with over 50 lives lost | |
| Cawarra | New South Wales | 12 July 1886 | Sank in rough seas, with 60 lives lost and 1 survivor | |
| Charlotte | United Kingdom | 1808 | A sloop that was wrecked near Port Jackson | |
| HMAS Colac | Royal Australian Navy | 4 March 1987 | A Bathurst-class corvette that was sunk as a target near Sydney | 34°49.2′S 151°32′E |
| Colonist | United Kingdom | 9 September 1894 | A cargo ship that ran aground off Newcastle | 32.914°S 151.797°E |
| Comboyne | Australia | 27 November 1920 | A steamship that was wrecked off Bass Point | 34.5973°S 150.9217°E |
| Contest | (United Kingdom of Great Britain and Ireland) New South Wales | 28 February 1804 | A sloop that sank in a storm off Port Stephens | |
| USS Craven | United States Navy | 25 May 1946 | A Caldwell-class destroyer that was scuttled off Sydney | |
| HMAS Doomba | Royal Australian Navy | 9 December 1976 | A warship that was scuttled off Dee Why | 33.716083°S 151.347217°E |
| Duckenfield | New South Wales | 1889 | The steamship struck Long Reef on its way to Sydney, but no lives lost | |
| Dunbar | Unknown | 20 August 1857 | Sank after striking rocks, with 121 lives lost | |
| Dundee | Unknown | August 1808 | A ship that foundered in a gale at the mouth of the Hunter River | |
| Edward Lombe | United Kingdom | 25 August 1834 | A merchantman that was wrecked on the Sydney Heads in a gale | 33°49.745′S 151°16.191′E |
| Edwin | (United Kingdom of Great Britain and Ireland) New South Wales | June 1816 | A schooner that was wrecked near Cape Hawke | |
| Eleanor Lancaster | United Kingdom | 7 November 1856 | A barque that was wrecked in a gale off Newcastle | |
| Elizabeth Henrietta | (United Kingdom of Great Britain and Ireland) New South Wales | 17 December 1825 | A brig that was wrecked off Newcastle | |
| HMAS Encounter | Royal Australian Navy | 14 September 1932 | A Challenger-class protected cruiser that was scuttled off Sydney | |
| Enterprize | United Kingdom | 1874 | A schooner that was wrecked in Richmond River | |
| Estramina | (United Kingdom of Great Britain and Ireland) New South Wales | 19 January 1816 | A schooner that ran aground off Newcastle | |
| Fairwind | Australian Army | 23 June 1950 | A lighter that was wrecked off South West Rocks | |
| Fingal | Australia | 5 May 1943 | A steamship that was torpedoed by Japanese submarine I-180 off Nambucca Heads | |
| Fitzroy | Australia | 26 June 1921 | A steamship that was wrecked off Cape Hawke | |
| Francis | (United Kingdom of Great Britain and Ireland) New South Wales | 21 March 1805 | A schooner that was wrecked off Newcastle | |
| George | (United Kingdom of Great Britain and Ireland) New South Wales | 1806 | A sloop that ran aground in Twofold Bay | |
| HMAS Geranium | Royal Australian Navy | 24 April 1935 | An Arabis-class sloop that was scuttled off Sydney Heads | |
| HMAS Goolgwai | Royal Australian Navy | 29 May 1955 | A minesweeper that was wrecked near Malabar | |
| Governor Hunter | (United Kingdom of Great Britain and Ireland) New South Wales | July 1816 | A schooner that was wrecked in a gale off Port Stephens | |
| Governor King | (United Kingdom of Great Britain and Ireland) New South Wales | 22 April 1806 | A schooner that was wrecked off Newcastle | |
| Grecian | (United Kingdom of Great Britain and Ireland) Tasmania | 6 May 1864 | A sailing ship that was wrecked on Nine Mile Beach in a gale | |
| Greycliffe | Australia | 3 November 1927 | Sydney ferry that collided with the mail steamer Tahiti and sank with the loss of 40 lives. | |
| Hawkesbury Packet | (United Kingdom of Great Britain and Ireland) New South Wales | 14 August 1817 | A sloop that ran aground at Minnamurra | 34.6244°S 150.8624°E |
| Hazard | (United Kingdom of Great Britain and Ireland) New South Wales | March 1809 | A sloop that ran aground on Box Head | 33.54227°S 151.3485°E |
| Herald | New South Wales | 1 April 1884 | A paddle steamer that sank off North Head | 33°49.492′S 151°17.462′E |
| Hereward | United Kingdom | 5 May 1898 | A clipper that ran aground on Maroubra Beach in a storm | |
| Hive | United Kingdom | 10 December 1835 | A convict ship that ran aground south of Jervis Bay | |
| Hope | (United Kingdom of Great Britain and Ireland) New South Wales | 1817 | A ship that was blown ashore at Port Stephens | |
| HMAS Huon | Royal Australian Navy | 10 April 1931 | A River-class torpedo-boat destroyer that was scuttled off Sydney after use as a target | |
| Iron Knight | Australia | 8 February 1943 | An iron ore carrier sunk by the Japanese submarine I-21 | 36°51′S 149°44′E |
| Itata | United Kingdom | | A barque that was damaged by fire and scuttled in Middle Harbour | 33°48.913′S 151°13.481′E |
| HMAS Karangi | Royal Australian Navy | 1970 | A Bar-class boom defence vessel that was abandoned at Homebush Bay | 33.8363379°S 151.0804902°E |
| HMAS Kara Kara | Royal Australian Navy | 31 January 1973 | A boom defence vessel that was sunk as a target off Jervis Bay | |
| HMAS Kianga | Royal Australian Navy | 7 July 1946 | A minesweeper that was scuttled off Sydney Heads | 33.998217°S 151.601283°E |
| HMAS Kookaburra | Royal Australian Navy | March 1970 | A Net-class boom defence vessel that was scuttled off Sydney | 33°51.300′S 151°21.196′E |
| Koonya | New South Wales | 25 January 1898 | A steamboat that ran aground off Cronulla Beach | 34.042876°S 151.206777°E |
| Koraaga | Australia | 10 September 1931 | A steamship that was wrecked off Gerringong | 34.783268°S 150.909879°E |
| HMAS Kuttabul | Royal Australian Navy | 31 May 1942 | A depot ship that was torpedoed during the attack on Sydney Harbour | |
| Limerick | New Zealand | 26 April 1943 | A cargo ship that was torpedoed by the Japanese submarine I-177 about 18 km (11 mi) east of Ballina | |
| Lindus | Victoria | 4 June 1899 | A steamship that was wrecked in a storm off Newcastle | 32.914°S 151.797°E |
| M84 | Imperial Japanese Navy | June 1942 | A Japanese midget submarine that sank sometime after being shelled during the attack on Sydney Harbour, with two lives lost | |
| Maianbar | Australia | 5 May 1940 | A steamship that ran aground on Nobbys Beach off Newcastle | 32°55′29″S 151°47′33.4″E |
| Maitland (1870) | New South Wales | 6 May 1898 | A paddle steamship that was wrecked during a gale at what is now Maitland Bay | 33°31′40.1″S 151°23′41.6″E |
| HMS Mallow | Royal Navy | 24 April 1935 | An Acacia-class sloop that was sunk as a target | |
| HMAS Marguerite | Royal Australian Navy | 1 August 1935 | An Arabis-class sloop that was sunk as a target | |
| Martha | (Kingdom of Great Britain) New South Wales | August 1800 | A schooner that was wrecked off Manly | |
| HMAS Medea | Royal Australian Navy | 20 January 1948 | A minesweeper that was scuttled off Sydney | 33.998267°S 151.601139°E |
| HMAS Mercedes | Royal Australian Navy | 23 January 1948 | A minesweeper that was scuttled off Sydney | 33.998367°S 151.600950°E |
| Merksworth | New South Wales | 7 May 1898 | A steamboat that was wrecked near Stockton Beach | 32.836883°S 151.93692°E |
| Myola | Australia | 2 April 1919 | A steam collier ('sixty-miler') that foundered off Long Reef | 33°45′40.3″S 151°21′48.1″E |
| Nancy | (United Kingdom of Great Britain and Ireland) New South Wales | 18 April 1805 | A sloop that was wrecked off Jervis Bay | 35.367°S 150.834333°E |
| Narara | Australia | 23 August 1903 | A steamboat that was wrecked near Barrenjoey | |
| Nimbin | Australia | 5 December 1940 | A steamship that hit a mine off Norah Head | 33°15.392′S 151°46.976′E |
| Norfolk | Great Britain | 1800 | A sloop that was run aground by convicts at Stockton Beach | |
| Oakland | New South Wales | 27 May 1903 | A small coaster, foundered off Cabbage Tree Island in storm, 11 lives lost | 32°40.765′S 152°14.003′E |
| HMAS Olive Cam | Royal Australian Navy | 2 November 1954 | An auxiliary minesweeper wrecked near Green Cape Lighthouse | 37.151107°S 150.007120°E |
| USS Osborne | United States Navy | 6 September 1947 | A Clemson-class destroyer that was scuttled off Sydney following a fire. | |
| HMAS Paterson | Royal Australian Navy | 11 June 1951 | A wooden auxiliary minesweeper that sank off The Entrance | 33.277836°S 151.571896°E |
| HMAS Pioneer | Royal Australian Navy | 18 February 1931 | A Pelorus-class protected cruiser that was scuttled off Sydney Heads | 33°51.850′S 151°19.844′E |
| Queen Bee | Australia | 2 September 1922 | A small twin screw steamer Sixty-miler that sunk off Barrenjoey Head, Broken Bay | |
| Queen of Nations | United Kingdom | 31 May 1881 | A clipper that ran aground off East Corrimal | |
| Recovery | United Kingdom | June 1816 | A sloop that was wrecked near Port Stephens | |
| Shockwave | Australia | 10 October 2009 | A yacht that ran aground off Flinders Islet | |
| HMAS Stalwart | Royal Australian Navy | 22 July 1939 | An S-class destroyer that was scuttled off Sydney | 33°59.906′S 151°36.067′E |
| HMAS Swan | Royal Australian Navy | 2 February 1934 | A River-class torpedo-boat destroyer that sank under tow in the Hawkesbury River | |
| Sygna | Norway | 26 May 1974 | Ran aground near Newcastle | 32°51′32.94″S 151°50′40.96″E |
| Tassie III | United States Army | 9 June 1945 | A motor vessel that was wrecked at Byron Bay | 28.638795°S 153.613906°E |
| Three Bees | United Kingdom | 20 May 1814 | A convict ship that caught fire off Bennelong Point | |
| Titan | Singapore | 29 December 1992 | A floating crane that broke tow and was scuttled near Kendall | 31.664267°S 152.873330°E |
| HMAS Torrens | Royal Australian Navy | 24 November 1930 | A River-class torpedo-boat destroyer that was sunk as a target off Sydney Heads | |
| Trial | (United Kingdom of Great Britain and Ireland) New South Wales | 1816 | A brig that ran aground at Trial Bay | |
| Tuncurry | Australia | 22 October 1916 | A steamboat that was wrecked off Broken Bay | 33°37.125′S 151°26.422′E |
| Tuggerah | Unknown | 1919 | Sank during a storm off Marley Beach south of Sydney, with 6 lives lost | |
| HMAS Vendetta | Royal Australian Navy | 2 July 1948 | A V-class destroyer that was scuttled off Sydney Heads | |
| HMAS Vigilant | Royal Australian Navy | April 1966 | A patrol boat that was scuttled off Sydney | |
| HMAS Voyager | Royal Australian Navy | 10 February 1964 | Sank after collision with HMAS Melbourne, with 82 killed | |
| Wandra | Australia | 15 December 1915 | A steamboat that was wrecked off Jervis Bay | 35.045217°S 150.839183°E |
| HMAS Waree | Royal Australian Navy | 17 October 1946 | A tugboat that ran aground at the mouth of the Clarence River | 29°25.385′S 153°21.854′E |
| Wendouree | New South Wales | 20 July 1898 | A steamship that was wrecked at the mouth of the Hunter River | 32.914°S 151.797°E |
| William Cossar | (United Kingdom of Great Britain and Ireland) New South Wales | 14 February 1825 | A schooner that was wrecked on the Sow and Pigs Reef | |
| Windsor | (United Kingdom of Great Britain and Ireland) New South Wales | 1816 | A sloop that was wrecked on Long Reef | |
| Wollongbar (1911) | Australia | 14 May 1921 | A steamship that was blown ashore at Byron Bay | 28.637086°S 153.610378°E |
| Wollongbar (1922) | Australia | 29 April 1943 | A steamship that was torpedoed by Japanese submarine I-180 off Crescent Head | |
| HMAS Woomera | Royal Australian Navy | 11 October 1960 | An armament store carrier that caught fire off Sydney | |
| USS WST-1 | United States Navy | 27 July 1945 | Naval salvage tug, ran aground on rocks off Susan Gilmore Beach, Newcastle, in heavy fog | |
| HMAS Yarra | Royal Australian Navy | 30 September 1929 | A River-class torpedo-boat destroyer that was sunk as a target | |

== Norfolk Island ==
| Ship | Flag | Sunk date | Notes | Coordinates |
|---|---|---|---|---|
| HMS Sirius | Royal Navy | 19 March 1790 | First Fleet ship that sank on the reef in Slaughter Bay, Norfolk Island, while landing stores | |

== Northern Territory ==
| Ship | Flag | Sunk date | Notes | Coordinates |
|---|---|---|---|---|
| HMAS Arrow | Royal Australian Navy | 25 December 1974 | An Attack-class patrol boat that was driven ashore by Cyclone Tracy. | |
| Booya | Australia | 24 December 1974 | A schooner that was sunk by Cyclone Tracy. | 12°23.381′S 130°46.281′E |
| Brisbane | Queensland | 10 October 1881 | Iron steamship that ran aground on Fish Reef off Quail Island north of Port Darwin | 12.43333°S 130.43833°E |
| British Motorist | United Kingdom | 19 February 1942 | A tanker that was sunk in the bombing of Darwin. | 12°28.96′S 130°50.33′E |
| Darwin Princess | Unknown | December 1974 | A passenger ferry that was sunk by Cyclone Tracy. | |
| Don Isidro | United States Army | 19 February 1942 | A transport ship that was bombed by Japanese planes returning from the attack on Darwin. The captain attempted to beach the ship on Bathurst Island, but the engines failed three miles offshore. | 11°42.3′S 130°02′E |
| Ellengowan | United Kingdom | 27 April 1888 | A schooner that sank at its mooring and was abandoned. | 12°32′28″S 130°52′08″E |
| HMAS Hankow | Royal Australian Navy | 18 September 1932 | A coal hulk that was sunk as a target off Darwin. | |
| I-124 | Imperial Japanese Navy | 21 January 1942 | An I-121-class submarine that was sunk during World War II. | 12°07′12.33″S 130°06′23.62″E |
| Kelat | Royal Australian Navy | 19 February 1942 | A sailing ship that was sunk in the bombing of Darwin. | 12°02′00″S 130°05′00″E |
| HMAS Maroubra | Royal Australian Navy | 10 May 1943 | A cutter that was sunk by Japanese aircraft off Milingimbi Island. | |
| Mauna Loa | United States Navy | 19 February 1942 | A cargo ship that was lost in the Japanese bombing of Darwin. | 12°29.86′S 130°49.16′E |
| HMAS Mavie | Royal Australian Navy | 19 February 1942 | An auxiliary ship that was lost in the Japanese bombing of Darwin. | |
| USAT Meigs | United States Army | 19 February 1942 | A transport ship that was lost in the Japanese bombing of Darwin. | 12°29.26′S 130°49.10′E |
| Neptuna | Hong Kong | 19 February 1942 | A cargo ship that was lost in the Japanese bombing of Darwin. | 12°28′18″S 130°50′57″E |
| HMAS Patricia Cam | Royal Australian Navy | 22 January 1943 | A minesweeper that was sunk by Japanese aircraft near the Wessel Islands. | |
| USS Peary | United States Navy | 19 February 1942 | A Clemson-class destroyer that was lost in the Japanese bombing of Darwin. | 12°28′30″S 130°49′45″E |
| Zealandia | Australia | 19 February 1942 | A cargo ship that was lost in the Japanese bombing of Darwin. | 12°29.00′S 130°51.05′E |

== Queensland ==
| Ship | Flag | Sunk date | Notes | Coordinates |
|---|---|---|---|---|
| Aarhus | Unknown | 24 February 1894 | A German made barque that ran aground near Cape Moreton, and is now a historical site. | 27°00′14.31″S 153°26′27.92″E |
| Bee | Australia | 17 March 1901 | A ferry that ran aground at Picnic Bay. | |
| HMAS Carroo | Royal Australian Navy | 19 September 1976 | A lighter that was scuttled at Hervey Bay. | |
| Cato | United Kingdom | 17 August 1803 | A full-rigged ship that ran aground on the Wreck Reefs, along with HMS Porpoise. | |
| AHS Centaur | Royal Australian Navy | 14 May 1943 | A hospital ship that was torpedoed by Japanese submarine I-177, killing 268 medical staff and crew. | 27°16.98′S 153°59.22′E |
| Cherry Venture | Singapore | 6 July 1973 | A cargo ship that ran aground on Teewah Beach. | 25°57′42.00″S 153°10′26.14″E |
| City of Adelaide | Australia | 1916 | A steamship that ran aground off Cockle Bay, Magnetic Island, and used as target practice for the Royal Australian Air Force during World War II. The wreck was sunk by Cyclone Althea in 1971. | 19.174842°N 146.825471°E |
| Dicky | Unknown | 4 February 1893 | A steamship that ran aground at what is now known as Dicky Beach. The visible remains of the wreck were removed in 2015. | |
| Duke of York | United Kingdom | September 1837 | A barque that was wrecked off Moreton Bay. | 27°02′11.84″S 153°21′13.64″E |
| Frederick | United Kingdom | May 1818 | Wrecked at Cape Flinders, Stanley Island. | |
| HMQS Gayunda | Royal Australian Navy | 2 June 1958 | A flat-iron gunboat that was beached as a breakwater off Woody Point. | 27.262°S 153.10713°E |
| George Rennie | Australia | 1902 | A paddle steamer that was scuttled in Picnic Bay, Magnetic Island. | |
| Gothenburg | Victoria | 24 February 1875 | A steamship that struck the Great Barrier Reef. | 19°22′06″S 148°03′21″E |
| HMS Harrier | Royal Navy | July 1891 | A schooner that was wrecked on the Great Barrier Reef near Cooktown. | |
| Jenny Lind | Unknown | 21 September 1850 | A barque that was wrecked on Kenn Reef on the Great Barrier Reef. | 21°16′S 155°48′E |
| Lady Bowen | Unknown | 1894 | A schooner that ran aground on a reef. | |
| Maheno | New Zealand | 9 July 1935 | An ocean liner that was beached on Fraser Island while under tow for scrapping in Japan. | 25°16′2″S 153°14′18″E |
| Marloo | Australia | 27 September 1914 | A steamship that was beached on Fraser Island. | 24.9488°S 153.3035°E |
| HMS Mermaid | Royal Navy | 13 June 1829 | A cutter that was wrecked east of Normanby Island. | 17.19923333°S 146.28885°E |
| Moltke | Australia | 1911 | A barque that was scuttled in Geoffrey Bay, Magnetic Island. | 19.153745°S 146.869344°E |
| Mount Elliot, Shipwreck | Australia | 1937 | A wreck off Morton Bay Queensland. | |
| HMS Pandora | Royal Navy | 28 August 1791 | A Porcupine-class post ship that struck and was wrecked on the Great Barrier Reef. | 11°23′S 143°59′E |
| HMS Porpoise | Royal Navy | 17 August 1803 | A sloop that ran aground on the Wreck Reefs, along with Cato. | |
| RMS Quetta | United Kingdom | 28 February 1890 | A merchant ship that struck a rock off Albany Island. | 10°36′34.61″S 142°37′27.01″E |
| Scottish Prince | Unknown | 2 February 1887 | A barque carrying passengers and cargo from Glasgow was wrecked at the southern tip of Stradbroke Island. The passengers and crew were rescued. Parts of the wreck can still be found in shallow water approximately 500 metres (1,600 ft) offshore south of the Southport Spit and it is a popular diving site. Since 2013, sand movement has resulted in increasing amounts of the wreck becoming visible. | |
| Swiftsure | United Kingdom | 4 July 1829 | A brig that was wrecked off the Cape York Peninsula. | |
| HMAS Warrnambool | Royal Australian Navy | 13 September 1947 | A Bathurst-class corvette that hit a mine in the Great Barrier Reef. | 14°45′32″S 145°49′41″E |
| HMAS Wyatt Earp | Royal Australian Navy | 24 January 1959 | A motor vessel that was wrecked in a storm off Double Island Point. | |
| Yongala | Australia | 23 March 1911 | A passenger ship that sank in a cyclone off Townsville. | 19°18′27″S 147°37′31″E |
| USS YP-279 | United States Navy | 5 September 1943 | A patrol vessel that foundered off Townsville. | 19°12′07″S 146°53′10″E |

== South Australia ==
| Ship | Flag | Sunk date | Notes | Coordinates |
|---|---|---|---|---|
| Aagot | Norway | 11 October 1907 | A sailing ship that was wrecked on Wardang Island. | |
| Admella | (United Kingdom of Great Britain and Ireland) South Australia | 5 August 1859 | A passenger ship that ran onto a reef off the Carpenter Rocks, with 89 lives lost including 14 children. | 37°52′47″S 140°21′3″E |
| Albatross | Unknown | 13 March 1913 | A ketch that struck Eclipse Reef, off Wardang Island, during a gale. | |
| Clan Ranald | United Kingdom | 31 January 1909 | A two decked turret steam ship which capsized and sank in a storm, killing 40 of her crew of 64, near the town of Edithburgh. | |
| Edith Haviland | Unknown | 19 June 1877 | A brig that was wrecked on the Carpenter Rocks. One seaman drowned attempting to swim to shore. | |
| Eleni K | Unknown | November 1966 | A screw steamer deliberately sunk to make an artificial reef between Goat Island and St Peter Island. | |
| Ellen | South Australia | 12 December 1908 | A freighter/trawler that was wrecked in Gulf St Vincent at Morgan's Beach. | 35°35′46.5″S 138°06′07.6″E |
| Ethel | Unknown | 2 January 1904 | An iron barque which ran aground at Reef Head, near Cape Spencer | 35°17′55″S 136°53′31″E |
| Fanny | Unknown | 22 June 1838 | A schooner that was blown ashore near Cape Jaffa, Kingston District Council. | |
| Ferret | South Australia | 14 November 1920 | A steamship that was fraudulently taken from its home in Scotland, and arrived in Victoria six months later. The conspirators were caught and charged, but the ship remained in Australia, eventually running aground off Cape Spencer in a storm. | |
| Frances | South Australia | 29 August 1840 | A cutter that was wrecked in the Neptune Islands. | 35°33′00″S 136°12′00″E. |
| Gloridia V | Unknown | 12 March 1977 | A cray-fishing boat that was wrecked in the North Neptune Islands. | |
| Geltwood | United Kingdom | 14 June 1876 | A barque that struck a reef near the town of Southend. | 37°37′36″S 140°10′51″E |
| Grecian | South Australia | 13 October 1850 | A barque that sank in a gale off Port Adelaide, one man drowned. | |
| Hougomont | Finland | 8 January 1933 | A barque that was scuttled as a breakwater in Stenhouse Bay. | |
| Investigator | Unknown | 24 April 1917 | A steamship that sank in rough weather southwest of Wardang Island. | |
| Koenig Wilhelm II | Unknown | 30 June 1857 | A barque 800 tons that was wrecked off Robe, with the loss of 16 crew after unloading 397 Chinese passengers for the Victorian goldfields. | |
| Lady Kinnaird | United Kingdom | 21 January 1880 | A barque that ran aground off Port Neill. | 34°7′48″S 136°21′36″E |
| Loch Sloy | United Kingdom | 24 April 1899 | A barque that was wrecked in the Brothers Rocks, off Kangaroo Island. | |
| Loch Vennachar | United Kingdom | September 1905 | A clipper that sank off Kangaroo Island with the loss of 27 lives. | 35°53′05″S 136°32′00″E |
| Macintyre | Unknown | 1 April 1927 | A schooner that was wrecked on a reef off Wardang Island. | |
| Maria | United Kingdom | 28 June 1840 | A brigantine that was wrecked off Cape Jaffa, South Australia | |
| Marion | Unknown | 11 July 1862 | A screw steamer wrecked off Cable Hut Bay. | |
| No 5 dumb hopper barge | Australia | April 1984 | A hopper barge that was scuttled in Gulf St Vincent. | 34°31′S 138°03′E |
| Notre Dame d'Avor | Unknown | 20 March 1920 | A barque that ran aground on Wardang Island. The wreck was gutted by an accidental fire the following May. | |
| Postboy | Australia | 1905 | A schooner that was wrecked at Arno Bay. | 33°55′12″S 136°34′12″E |
| Saint Michele | Unknown | 30 March 1965 | A fishing boat that was wrecked on South Neptune Islands. | |
| Santiago | Australia | 19 August 1945 | A 3 masted barque abandoned in the Garden Island Ships' Graveyard near Port Adelaide. | 34°48′36″S 138°32′24″E |
| Songvaar | Norway | 14 April 1912 | A Norwegian cargo ship that sank near Wardang Island when its hull was pierced by one of its own anchors. The wreck was eventually blown up as a shipping hazard. | |
| Star of Greece | Unknown | 13 July 1888 | A cargo ship that was wrecked in a storm off Port Willunga. | |
| South Australian | United Kingdom | 8 December 1837 | A brig-sloop, formerly the former RN vessel the Swallow (1824), was wrecked at Encounter Bay. | 35°34.641′S 138°36.213′E |
| Tom Brennan | Australia | 1960 or 1963 | A barge abandoned on the Birdsville Track to the south of the Cooper Creek in Etadunna. | 28°37′49″S 138°42′30″E |
| Varoon | Unknown | January 1856 | A cargo ship that was wrecked twenty miles west of Cape Northumberland. | |
| Water Witch | South Australia | 5 December 1842 | A cutter which sunk whilst moored in the River Murray at Moorundie, South Australia. | 34°24′0″S 139°37′12″E |
| Willyama | Unknown | 13 April 1907 | A screw steamer wrecked south of Rhino Head, near Marion Bay. | 35°15'04.8"S 136°58'44.0"E |
| Venus | Unknown | 14 June 1946 | A cutter that was wrecked in the North Neptune Islands. | |
| Zanoni | United Kingdom | 11 February 1867 | A barque which foundered during a squall in Gulf St Vincent. | 34°30′43.8″S 138°03′48.4″E |

== Tasmania ==
| Ship | Flag | Sunk date | Notes | Coordinates |
|---|---|---|---|---|
| Actaeon | United Kingdom | 28 October 1822 | A ship that was wrecked in the D'Entrecasteaux Channel. | |
| Blythe Star | Norway | 13 October 1973 | A coastal freighter that capsized and sank off South West Cape. All the crew escaped the vessel but three lives were lost before the survivors were rescued. | |
| The Brothers | United Kingdom | 25 June 1816 | A schooner that was driven ashore near the Kent Group. | |
| Cataraqui | United Kingdom | 4 August 1845 | 400 lost when wrecked on King Island. | 40°1′37.7″S 143°52′49.6″E |
| Campbell Macquarie | United Kingdom | 10 June 1812 | A ship that was wrecked off Macquarie Island. | 54.62°S 158.86°E |
| Daphne | United Kingdom | 26 October 1818 | A brig that was wrecked off East Island. | |
| Enchantress | United Kingdom | 16 July 1835 | A barque that struck the rocks about half a mile off the western shore of Bruny Island. | |
| George III | United Kingdom | 12 March 1835 | A convict ship that sank in the D'Entrecasteaux Channel. | 43.51°S 146.98°E |
| Hebe | India | 15 June 1808 | A ship that struck a reef off George Town. | 41°03′42.92″S 146°45′18.90″E |
| Iron Baron | Australia | 10 July 1995 | A bulk carrier that ran aground on a reef off George Town, causing an oil spill. It was refloated and scuttled off Flinders Island. | 39.22°S 149.13°E |
| Lake Illawarra | Australia | 5 January 1975 | Bulk carrier wrecked in the River Derwent, with 12 lives lost. | 42°51′52″S 147°20′45″E |
| Nella Dan | Denmark | 24 December 1987 | An icebreaker that ran aground off Macquarie Island, and was subsequently scuttled. | |
| Netherby | United Kingdom | 23 July 1866 | A full-rigged ship that ran aground off King Island. | |
| Neva | United Kingdom | 13 May 1835 | A convict ship that sank off King Island, with about 225 lives lost. | |
| Phatisalam | United Kingdom | 9 July 1821 | A ship that ran aground on Hunter Island. | |
| Sydney Cove | Great Britain | 9 February 1797 | Sank at Preservation Island with no loss of life. | 40.49°S 148.07°E |

== Victoria ==
| Ship | Flag | Sunk date | Notes | Coordinates |
|---|---|---|---|---|
| Alert | Victoria | 28 December 1893 | A steamship that sank off Cape Schanck. | 38°31′34.23″S 144°52′29.35″E |
| Cambridge | United Kingdom | 7 November 1940 | A steamship that hit a mine off Wilsons Promontory. | 39°9′32″S 146°29′25″E |
| HMVS Cerberus | Royal Australian Navy | 2 September 1926 | A breastwork monitor that was scuttled as a breakwater in Half Moon Bay. | 37.967487°S 145.00789°E |
| Cheviot | Victoria | 19 October 1887 | A steamship that was wrecked near Point Nepean. | 38.31417°S 144.66417°E |
| City of Launceston | Tasmania | 19 November 1865 | A steamship that collided with Penola at Port Phillip. | 38°4′33″S 144°49′31″E |
| City of Rayville | United States | 8 November 1940 | A steamship that hit a mine off Cape Otway. | 38.9789°S 143.5075°E |
| Clonmel | United Kingdom | 2 January 1841 | A paddle steamer that was wrecked at Clonmel Island, near the entrance to Corner Inlet. | 38°44′44″S 146°40′37″E |
| Curlip | Australia | 3 March 1919 | A paddle steamer that was washed out to sea in a flash flood, and stranded on a beach at Marlo. | |
| Earl of Charlemont | United Kingdom | 18 June 1853 | A passenger ship that ran aground off Barwon Heads. | 38°18′33.43″S 144°29′28.59″E |
| Falls of Halladale | United Kingdom | 14 November 1908 | A barque that ran onto the rocks near Peterborough. | 38.6082°S 142.8571°E |
| HMAS Goorangai | Royal Australian Navy | 20 November 1940 | A minesweeper that collided with Duntroon at Port Phillip. | 38.29278°S 144.6825°E |
| HMVS Gordon | Royal Australian Navy | 14 November 1914 | A torpedo boat that was rammed and sunk at Port Phillip. | |
| Joseph H. Scammell | Canada | 7 May 1891 | A full-rigged ship that ran aground on a reef off Torquay. | 38°20′31″S 144°19′54″E |
| Kanowna | Australia | 19 February 1929 | One of Victoria's largest shipwrecks, found in 2005 in Bass Strait. | 39°18′36″S 146°07′48″E |
| Lady Mary Pelham | United Kingdom | 31 August 1849 | A brig that was beached at Port Fairy. | |
| Lightning | United Kingdom | 31 October 1869 | An extreme clipper that caught fire and was scuttled off Geelong. | 38°8′24″S 144°22′7″E |
| Loch Ard | United Kingdom | 1 June 1878 | Struck Mutton Bird Island. | 38°38′55″S 143°04′19″E |
| Petriana | United Kingdom | 28 November 1903 | An oil tanker that struck a reef off Point Nepean, releasing Australia's first major oil spill. | |
| Pioneer | Australia | 9 March 1950 | A dredger that was scuttled off Port Phillip. | |
| Saros | Australia | 23 December 1937 | Ran aground at Point Hicks. | 37°48′13″S 149°16′31″E |

== Western Australia ==
| Ship | Flag | Sunk date | Notes | Coordinates |
|---|---|---|---|---|
| Alacrity | France | April 1931 | A tugboat that was wrecked in a storm in Cockburn Sound. | 32.140078°S 115.763864°E |
| Alice | Unknown | 14 June 1915 | A 132-ton vessel that was wrecked on Brue reef with the loss of 13 of its 41 crew. | 15.91666°S 123.03333°E |
| Alkimos | Greece | May 1964 | Greek merchant ship. | 31°36′38″S 115°39′13″E |
| Arpenteur | United Kingdom | November 1849 | Merchant ship wrecked off Cheyne Beach | 34.8698°S 118.4037°E |
| Batavia | Dutch East India Company | 4 June 1629 | Dutch VOC merchant sailing ship. | 28°29′25″S 113°47′36″E |
| Batoe Bassi | Netherlands | 31 June 1880 | A Dutch vessel that was run aground after it began taking on water. | 33.90786°S 122.83269°E |
| Belinda | United Kingdom | 19 July 1824 | A brig that foundered off Middle Island in the Recherche Archipelago. | 34.09009°S 123.21031°E |
| Ben Dearg | Australia | 14 April 1956 | A Castle-class trawler that was scuttled near Swarbricks Beach east of Albany | 35.0104°S 118.0517°E |
| Ben Ledi | Unknown | 16 December 1879 | An 1,107-ton iron sailing ship that ran aground on Pelsaert Island in the Houtman Abrolhos, without loss of life, in the same location as the wreck of Marten several years previously. | 28.93687°S 113.969225°E |
| Bittern | Unknown | 10 May 1885 | Three-masted schooner, Capt. A. Bergman or Berghmann, taking jarrah piles from Hamlyn to Darwin, wrecked off Browse Island. | 14°06′32″S 123°32′57″E |
| Bunyip (or Cartabunup) | Unknown | 24 May 1877 | A cutter engaged in transporting materials for the construction of a telegraph line, ran aground at Twilight Cove in a storm that also claimed the Twilight. The crew survived. | |
| Carlisle Castle | United Kingdom | 11 July 1899 | British iron ship that struck a reef near Rockingham with the loss of 24 lives, in the same storm that claimed City of York. | 32.33325°S 115.6325°E |
| Centaur | United Kingdom | 9 December 1874 | A brig that struck a reef near Perth. | 31.86376°S 115.711118°E |
| Cervantes | Unknown | 20 June 1844 | A barque used for whaling, blown onto a sandbar and subsequently abandoned. The crew survived. | 30.5133666667°S 115.05°E |
| Cheynes II | Australia | 1992 | A former whale chaser, broke loose from the Albany jetty in 1992 and grounded on a sandbank in the Princess Royal Harbour. | 35.056422°S 117.909888°E |
| City of York | United Kingdom | 12 July 1899 | A barque that hit a reef off Rottnest Island with the loss of 11 lives (in the same storm that claimed Carlisle Castle). | 31°59.72′S 115°29.25′E |
| Cochituate | United States | 14 June 1861 | An American barque that struck a reef west of Rat Island in the Houtman Abrolhos. A crew member travelled overland to Fremantle to summon help for the remainder. | 28.727856°S 113.705666°E |
| Contest | Unknown | 14 July 1874 | A 322-ton barque that dragged its anchor and went ashore at what is now Rockingham. | 32.274464°S 115.713694°E |
| Correio da Azia | Portugal | 25 November 1816 | A Portuguese vessel wrecked at Point Cloates | 22.863433°S 113.750667°E |
| Cumberland | United Kingdom | 4 March 1830 | A ship wrecked after hitting a submerged rock off Cape Leeuwin en route to Fremantle. | 34.2966833333°S 115.0403333333°E |
| Duchess | Australia | 1945 | Deliberately scuttled in the Rottnest Island ship graveyard. | |
| HMAS Derwent | Royal Australian Navy | 21 December 1994 | A River-class destroyer escort that was sunk as an artificial reef. | |
| Eglinton | United Kingdom | 3 September 1852 | A 462-ton barque that ran aground on Eglinton Rocks, 800 metres (2,600 ft) off Alkimos | 31.6408333333°S 115.659°E |
| Elizabeth | United Kingdom | 22 September 1839 | A 194-ton merchant ship that ran aground at Cottesloe. | 32.01011667°S 115.751233°E |
| Emily Taylor | Unknown | 21 May 1830 | A vessel blown onto shore near Fremantle (the same storm that wrecked James). | 32.065607°S 115.749697°E |
| Emma | Unknown | March 1867 | A 116-ton two-masted wooden-hulled schooner, wrecked near Coral Bay. | 23.08255°S 113.7335°E |
| Fanny Nicholson | United Kingdom | 21 November 1872 | A barque that was wrecked at Goode Beach in King George Sound. | 35.083°S 117.9367°E |
| Georgette | Western Australia | 1 December 1876 | A steamship that was wrecked at Calgardup Bay with 12 lives lost. | 34.033°S 114.99°E |
| Hadda | Unknown | 30 April 1877 | A 316-ton barque that struck a reef near Beacon Island in the Houtman Abrolhos without loss of life. | 28.472267°S 113.792417°E |
| Hero of the Nile | Unknown | 20 October 1876 | A barque involved in the guano trade, wrecked without loss of life after striking a reef at Warnbro Sound. | 32.36445°S 115.70595°E |
| Ivy | Unknown | 29 August 1914 | A fishing lugger that overturned in strong winds off Gun Island, Houtman Abrolhos, with the loss of two of the three crew members. The vessel eventually drifted, mastless, onto Wooded Island. | |
| James | Unknown | 21 May 1830 | A passenger and cargo ship that was blown onto shore from Owen Anchorage, off Fremantle (the same storm that wrecked Emily Taylor). | 32.09576°S 115.75861°E |
| James Matthews | Unknown | 22 July 1841 | A 107-ton former slave ship, which struck rocks and sank near Woodman Point after parting its anchor warp. | 32.13193°S 115.743822°E |
| James Service | Unknown | 22 July 1878 | A barque that went down in a storm off Mandurah. | |
| Jon Jim | Unknown | 17 July 1961 | A fishing boat that ran aground at Pelsaert Island, Houtman Abrolhos. | 28.986064°S 113.962254°E |
| Koolama | Australia | 3 March 1942 | A merchant vessel that was bombed by Japanese aircraft and later capsized at Wyndham. The wreck was towed further out to sea in 1948. | 15.449783°S 128.101066°E |
| Korean Star | Panama | 20 May 1988 | A Panamanian bulk carrier that was lost off Cape Cuvier. | 24°12′29″S 113°25′30″E |
| Kori | Unknown | 16 January 1907 | A schooner that foundered at Tappers Inlet during a tropical cyclone, without loss of life. | 16.8167°S 122.55°E |
| Kormoran | Kriegsmarine | 19 November 1941 | German merchant raider scuttled after being damaged in battle by HMAS Sydney. | 26°05′46″S 111°04′33″E |
| Kwinana | Australia | 29 May 1922 | A steamship wrecked in a storm off Kwinana. | |
| Lady Elizabeth | United Kingdom | 30 June 1878 | A barque that struck a reef off Rottnest Island. | |
| Lady Lyttleton | United Kingdom | 17 July 1867 | A barque that sank in Emu Point Channel near Albany | 34.997717°S 117.95031°E |
| Lively | United Kingdom | c.1806-1808 | An English whaler wrecked at Mermaid Reef, Rowley Shoals. | 17°05.381′S 119°35.490′E |
| Manfred | Unknown | 24 January 1879 | A 585-ton barque that was wrecked in a tropical cyclone while collecting guano at the Lacepede Islands. | 16.852652°S 122.127839°E |
| Mountaineer | Unknown | 24 March 1835 | A sealing vessel that was swept ashore in a gale without any loss of life. | 34.0016°S 122.2007°E |
| Neptune | Unknown | 13 June 1901 | A cutter that was wrecked in the Geelvink Channel during a gale, with the loss of one life. | |
| Ocean Queen | Unknown | 13 September 1842 | A barque that ran aground at Half Moon Reef, Pelsaert Group, Houtman Abrolhos. | 28°56.5′S 113°51.7′E |
| RMS Orizaba | United Kingdom | 17 February 1905 | A Royal Mail Ship that ran aground off Rockingham. | 32.278613°S 115.624866°E |
| Pericles | United Kingdom | 31 March 1910 | An ocean liner that struck a rock and sank 6 miles (9.7 km) south of Cape Leeuwin. | 34.42217°S 115.13733°E |
| HMAS Perth | Royal Australian Navy | 24 November 2001 | A Perth-class guided missile destroyer scuttled as a dive wreck off Albany. | 35.085°S 117.96°E |
| Preston | Unknown | 20 September 1855 | A 20-ton schooner that ran aground on Pelsaert Island in the Pelsaert Group of the Houtman Abrolhos without any loss of life. | |
| Rapid | United States | 7 January 1811 | An American China trader wrecked at Ningaloo Reef | 22.739438°S 113.692643°E |
| Redemptora | Brazil | C. 1898 | Ex- North American. A wooden clipper abandoned or sunk off Cockburn. | 32.1513°S 115.7663°E |
| Rockingham | United Kingdom | 22 May 1830 | A ship that foundered at Careening Bay, Garden Island. | |
| Sanko Harvest | Panama | 14 February 1991 | A bulk carrier that struck a reef off Esperance. | 34°7.4′S 122°5.1′E |
| HMAS Swan | Royal Australian Navy | 14 December 1997 | A River-class destroyer escort that was sunk as a dive wreck off Dunsborough. | 33°33′02″S 115°06′02″E |
| Swift | Tasmania | 31 August 1896 | A Tasmanian-built ketch that struck a submerged rock at Twilight Cove. The crew survived. | 32.283333°S 125.983333°E |
| HMAS Sydney | Royal Australian Navy | 19 November 1941 | A Leander-class cruiser sunk in battle by the German merchant raider Kormoran. | 26°14′31″S 111°12′48″E |
| Thames | United Kingdom | 22 May 1830 | A ship blown onto shore near Fremantle, during the same storm that wrecked the James and the Emily Taylor. | 32.063871°S 115.749321°E |
| HMAS Torrens | Royal Australian Navy | 14 June 1999 | A River-class destroyer escort that was sunk as a target. | |
| Tryall | East India Company | 25 May 1622 | East India Company ship. | 20°16′18″S 115°23′18″E |
| Twilight | Unknown | 24 May 1877 | A cutter engaged in transporting materials for the construction of a telegraph line, ran aground at Twilight Cove in a storm that also claimed the Bunyip. | |
| HMS Undine | Royal Navy | 25 March 1890 | A gunboat that was wrecked in the King George Sound. | |
| Venus | Unknown | 10 April 1851 | A schooner that struck a reef in the Pelsaert Group of the Houtman Abrolhos, with the loss of one life. Survivors were stranded on Middle Island for six months. | |
| Vergulde Draeck | Dutch East India Company | 28 April 1656 | Dutch VOC merchant sailing ship. | 31°13.36′S 115°21.48′E |
| HMAS Wallaroo | Royal Australian Navy | 11 June 1943 | A Bathurst-class corvette that collided with Henry Gilbert Costin off Fremantle. | 31°54′24″S 114°37′31″E |
| Wave | United Kingdom | 5 July 1848 | A brig sunk off Cheynes Beach near Cape Riche | 34.5945°S 118.75165°E |
| Windsor | Unknown | 2 February 1908 | An iron steamer wrecked on Half Moon Reef, Pelsaert Group, Houtman Abrolhos with the loss of three lives, plus a further two rescuers. It had been en route from Fremantle to Hong Kong. | 28°58.5′S 113°54.2′E |
| Xantho | Western Australia | November 1872 | A steamship that sank off Gregory. | 28°11′11″S 114°14′10″E |
| Yarra | Unknown | 15 January 1884 | A schooner that hit Scott Reef during a gale. | 14.040493°S 121.770013°E |
| Zeewijk | Dutch East India Company | 9 June 1727 | Dutch VOC merchant sailing ship. | 28°54′30″S 113°49′0″E |
| Zuytdorp | Dutch East India Company | 1712 | Dutch VOC merchant sailing ship. | 27°11′10″S 113°56′13″E |

== See also ==
- Australian National Shipwreck Database
- HMAS Hobart (D39)
- List of 17th-century shipwrecks in Australia
- Ship graveyard#Australia
