= Cashmore =

Cashmore may refer to:

== People ==
- Adrian Cashmore (born 1973), New Zealand rugby player
- Anthony Cashmore (born 1941), New Zealand scientist
- Arthur Cashmore (1893–1969), English footballer
- Bill Cashmore (politician), New Zealand politician
- Bill Cashmore (actor) (1961–2017), English actor, playwright, and political candidate
- Claire Cashmore (born 1988), British Paralympian swimmer
- Denis William Cashmore (1907–1982), English footballer
- Jennifer Cashmore (1937–2024), Australian politician
- John Cashmore (1895–1961), American politician
- Michael Cashmore (businessman) (1815–1886), Australian pioneer
- Michael Cashmore, British composer
- Pete Cashmore (born 1985), British new media expert
- Roger Cashmore (born 1944), British physicist
- Thomas Cashmore (1892–1984), British bishop

== Places ==
- Cashmore, Victoria, Australia

== Business ==
- John Cashmore Ltd, former scrapping company of Newport, South Wales

== See also ==
- Cashmere (disambiguation)
