= Solomon Wiseman =

English convict, merchant, and ferryman

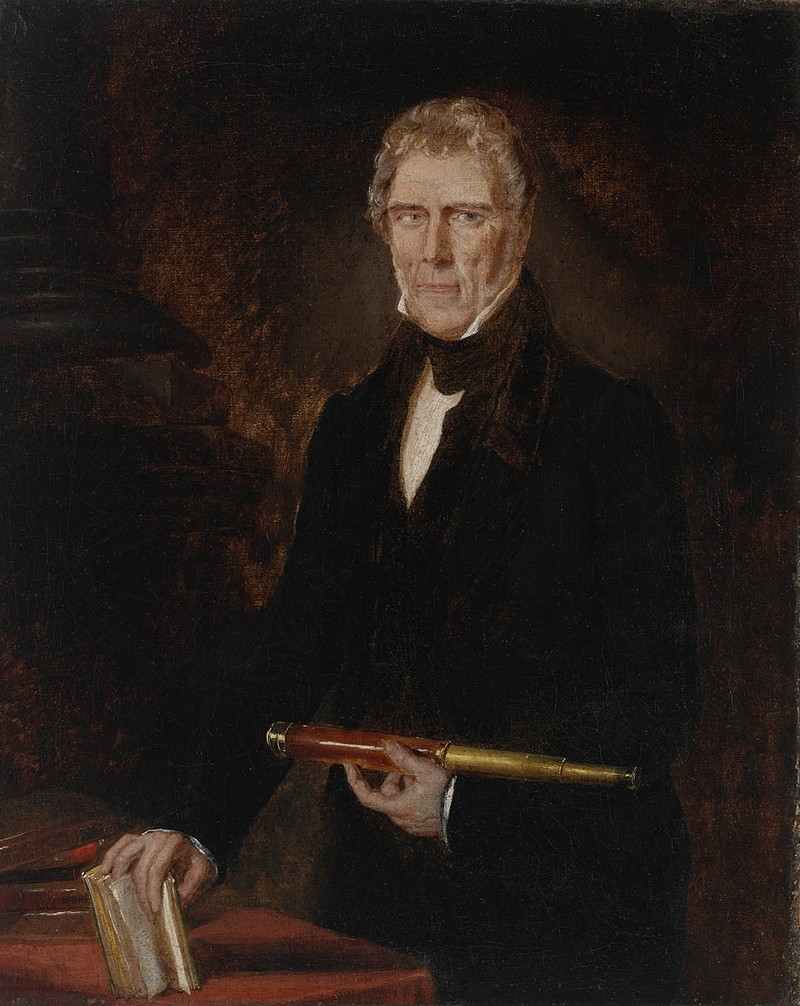
Oil painting of Solomon Wiseman

Solomon Wiseman (16 April 1777 - 28 November 1838) was a convict, merchant and ferryman. The town called Wiseman's Ferry, New South Wales, Australia is named after him.

== Life ==
Wiseman was born in Southwark, England in 1777, the son of a Richard Wiseman, a cloth worker and victualler, and became a lighterman on the Thames. He was employed by the British government to carry spies to France. On 30 October 1805 he was found guilty of stealing wood from a lighter and was sentenced to death. This was commuted to Transportation for Life and he was sent to New South Wales where he arrived in August 1806 on the Alexander. He traveled with his wife Jane and two sons, in a cabin rather than with the other convicts. On arrival he was almost immediately given conditional liberty and assigned to his wife. In 1810 he was given his ticket of leave and in 1812, a pardon.

In 1811 Wiseman had constructed a sloop called the Hawkesbury Packet which was a coastal trader. Not long after he acquired the sloop Hope. He shipped coal from Newcastle (New South Wales), wheat from the Hawkesbury and timber from Shoalhaven. Both ships were wrecked within months of each other in 1817. After the wrecks of his ships he purchased the Mary Ann (ship) which he chartered to the Government. In 1817 he was granted a lease of 200 acres (0.81 km^{2}) on the Hawkesbury River at Lower Portland Head, which later became known as Wiseman's Ferry. In 1821 he established an inn called 'the Sign of the Packet' on the banks of the river. When he heard that the government intended to build a road between Sydney and the Hunter valley, he persuaded the authorities to route it through his land. Road building commenced in 1826 with two gangs operating either side of the river, and in 1827 he received a contract to supply all provisions to the gangs and later that year a license to operate a ferry to transport people and stock across the river. The ferry crossing site was moved in 1829, to its current site, when a route was chosen for the Great North Rd. The current site is the oldest ferry crossing in Australia. In 1826 he built on his land an elaborate house for his second wife, Sophia, called Cobhams Hall. This is now a pub called Wiseman's Inn Hotel.

He died in 1838.

== The Secret River ==
The Secret River, a novel written by Wiseman's great-great-great-granddaughter, Kate Grenville, was inspired by her desire to understand "what had happened when Wiseman arrived there [the area now known as Wiseman's Ferry] and started the business of 'settling'". Her inspiration to understand this came from her taking part in the 28-05-2000 Reconciliation Walk across Sydney Harbour Bridge during which she realised that she didn't know much about "what had gone on between the Aboriginal people and the settlers in those early days". Initially intended to be a work of non-fiction about Wiseman, the book eventually became a fictional work based on her research into Wiseman but not specifically about Wiseman himself.

== See also ==
- List of convicts transported to Australia
