= List of shipwrecks in August 1834 =

The list of shipwrecks in August 1834 includes ships sunk, foundered, wrecked, grounded or otherwise lost during August 1834.

== 1 August ==
List of shipwrecks: 1 August 1834
Ship	State	Description
Betsey	United Kingdom	The ship was in collision with the steamship Lord Nelson (United Kingdom) in the North Sea off Spurn Point, Yorkshire and was abandoned. She later drove ashore at Sandhale, Lincolnshire; was refloated and taken in to Grimsby, Lincolnshire.

== 2 August ==
List of shipwrecks: 2 August 1834
Ship	State	Description
Marion	United Kingdom	The schooner departed from Arkhangelsk, Russia for Arbroath, Forfarshire. No further trace, presumed foundered with the loss of all hands.

== 3 August ==
List of shipwrecks: 3 August 1834
Ship	State	Description
Adventurer	United Kingdom	The ship was wrecked on the coast of Labrador, British North America. Her crew were rescued. She was on a voyage from the Restigouche River to London.
Elvira	United States	The ship was wrecked at "Hurlgate". She was on a voyage from Windsor, Nova Scotia, British North America to New York.
Lucy	United States	The brig was struck by lightning off the mouth of the Clyde and foundered with the loss of nine of her ten crew. The survivor was rescued by the schooner Good Intent (United Kingdom). Lucy was on a voyage from Havana, Cuba to Greenock, Renfrewshire, United Kingdom.

== 4 August ==
List of shipwrecks: 4 August 1834
Ship	State	Description
Betsey	United Kingdom	The ship struck a sandbank and sank in the North Sea off North Somercotes, Lincolnshire. Her crew were rescued.

== 5 August ==
List of shipwrecks: 5 August 1834
Ship	State	Description
John Wallace	United Kingdom	The ship was wrecked on East Point, Prince Edward Island, British North America.
Susan	United Kingdom	The ship was wrecked on the Hogsty Reef. Her crew were rescued.

== 6 August ==
List of shipwrecks: 6 August 1834
Ship	State	Description
Conqueror	United Kingdom	The ship was wrecked on Breaksea Point, Glamorgan.

== 7 August ==
List of shipwrecks: 7 August 1834
Ship	State	Description
Senator	United Kingdom	The ship was wrecked on the Pentland Skerries, in the Firth of Forth. She was on a voyage from Sunderland, County Durham to Quebec City, Lower Canada, British North America.

== 8 August ==
List of shipwrecks: 8 August 1834
Ship	State	Description
Michigan	United States	The ship sprang a leak and was abandoned in the Atlantic Ocean (44°N 36°W). She was on a voyage from Liverpool, Lancashire, United Kingdom to Boston, Massachusetts.

== 9 August ==
List of shipwrecks: 9 August 1834
Ship	State	Description
Helvetius	United Kingdom	The whaler was lost east of the South Sandwich Islands. Her crew were rescued.
Ontario	United States	The brig was struck by lightning off Premantura, Austrian Empire and set on fire. She was abandoned the next day. Her crew were rescued by the brig Ciro ( Austrian Empire). Ontario was on a voyage from Mobile, Alabama to Trieste.

== 10 August ==
List of shipwrecks: 10 August 1834
Ship	State	Description
Sarah and Frances	United Kingdom	The ship was in collision with Hebden and sank in the Irish Sea. She was on a voyage from Wexford to Liverpool, Lancashire.

== 12 August ==
List of shipwrecks: 12 August 1834
Ship	State	Description
Nandi	United Kingdom	The ship ran agroundd on the Arklow Banks, in the Irish Sea. She sank on 16 August. Nandi was on a voyage from Liverpool, Lancashire to Rio de Janeiro, Brazil.
Susan	United States	The ship capsized. Her crew were rescued. She was on a voyage from New York to Port au Prince, Haiti.

== 13 August ==
List of shipwrecks: 13 August 1834
Ship	State	Description
Maria	Bremen	The ship was in collision with Dalmatia (United Kingdom) and sank in the English Channel off Beachy Head, Sussex. Her crew were rescued. Maria was on a voyage from Havana, Cuba to Bremen.

== 14 August ==
List of shipwrecks: 14 August 1834
Ship	State	Description
Favourite	United Kingdom	The smack was wrecked on the Sunk Sand, in the North Sea off the coast of Essex. Her crew were resched.

== 15 August ==
List of shipwrecks: 15 August 1834
Ship	State	Description
Charles Eaton	United Kingdom	The barque was wrecked on the Great Barrier Reef near the Sir Charles Hardy Islands. Her passengers and crew survived the wreck itself, but most of them were murdered by Torres Strait islanders.
Smales	United Kingdom	The ship struck a reef of the east coast of Gotland, Sweden and sank. She was on a voyage from Kronstadt, Russia to Hull, Yorkshire.

== 16 August ==
List of shipwrecks: 16 August 1834
Ship	State	Description
Henriette et Marie	France	The ship was wrecked on the Point des Aigrettes, Île Bourbon.
Janet Dunlop	United Kingdom	The brig was wrecked on the Northern Triangle, 60 nautical miles (110 km) off Belize City, British Honduras.
William Pitt	United Kingdom	The ship was run down and sunk in the Mediterranean Sea off Oran, Algeria with the loss of two of her crew. She was on a voyage from Liverpool, Lancashire to Livorno, Grand Duchy of Tuscany.

== 20 August ==
List of shipwrecks: 20 August 1834
Ship	State	Description
Ann	United Kingdom	The schooner capsized and sank in the Kattegat. Her crew were rescued. She was on a voyage from Riga, Russia to Hull, Yorkshire.

== 22 August ==
List of shipwrecks: 22 August 1834
Ship	State	Description
Charles Eaton	United Kingdom	The barque was wrecked on Double Island, in the Torres Strait. Five of the 32 people on board survived. They landed on Timor Laut, from where they departed some thirteen months later on a proa form Amboyna, Spanish East Indies. The rest were presumed to have drowned, been murdered or enslaved by the local inhabitants, although at least eight or nine survivors were reported to be alive as of October 1835.

== 25 August ==
List of shipwrecks: 25 August 1834
Ship	State	Description
Edward Lombe	United Kingdom	The ship was wrecked near Port Jackson, New South Wales with the loss of twelve lives. She was on a voyage from London to Hobart, Van Diemen's Land and Sydney, New South Wales.

== 26 August ==
List of shipwrecks: 26 August 1834
Ship	State	Description
Pearl	United States	The schooner was wrecked on the Old Inlet Shoals, off Egg Harbor, New Jersey. She was on a voyage from "Newburn" to New York.

== 27 August ==
List of shipwrecks: 27 August 1834
Ship	State	Description
HMRC Camelion	Board of Customs	The cutter was run down and sunk by HMS Castor (Royal Navy) in the English Channel 3 nautical miles (5.6 km) off Dover, Kent with the loss of thirteen of her seventeen crew.

== 28 August ==
List of shipwrecks: 28 August 1834
Ship	State	Description
Aid	United Kingdom	The ship was wrecked at Point Escuminac, New Brunswick, British North America. She was on a voyage from Liverpool, Lancashire to Miramichi, New Brunswick.
Alida	Hamburg	The ship was driven ashore and wrecked on Norderney, Kingdom of Hanover. Her crew were rescued. She was on a voyage from Hamburg to Rotterdam, South Holland, Netherlands.
Pacific	United Kingdom	The ship was wrecked north of the "port of Rio Grande" with the loss of four of her crew.
San Joze Diligente	Brazil	The ship was lost on the coast of Paraíba. She was on a voyage from Pernambuco to Maranhão.

== 30 August ==
List of shipwrecks: 30 August 1834
Ship	State	Description
Adventure	United Kingdom	The ship ran aground on Hogland, Russia and sank. She was on a voyage from Saint Petersburg, Russia to Dublin.

== 31 August ==
List of shipwrecks: 31 August 1834
Ship	State	Description
Funchal	Portugal	The brig sprang a leak and was abandoned in the Atlantic Ocean 90 nautical miles (170 km) off Cape Henry, Virginia, United States. She was on a voyage from Madeira to New York, United States.
Pax	Spain	The ship was wrecked near Manila, Spanish East Indies. All on board were rescued. She was on a voyage from Manila to Cádiz.

== Unknown date ==
List of shipwrecks: Unknown date 1834
Ship	State	Description
Caroline	United States	The ship was lost near Rio de Janeiro, Brazil.
Mariner	United Kingdom	The brig was wrecked before 7 August. She may have been attacked and plundered by pirates. The wreck was discovered at 8°46′N 24°17′W by Cervantes (United Kingdom).
Trial	United Kingdom	The brig was wrecked on "Boobare Point, Titmanan" before 12 August. All on board were rescued. She was on a voyage from Philadelphia, Pennsylvania, United States to St. Andrews, New Brunswick, British North America.
Vrienschap	Netherlands	The ship departed from Newcastle upon Tyne, Northumberland, United kingdom for Groningen. No further trace, presumed foundered with the loss of all hands.
