= HMS Medusa =

Ten ships of the Royal Navy have borne the name HMS Medusa, after the ancient Greek mythological figure Medusa:

- HMS Medusa (1785) was a 50-gun fourth rate launched in 1785 and wrecked in 1798.
- HMS Medusa was a 38-gun fifth-rate frigate launched in 1801. She was Nelson's flagship on his return to England at Harwich on 9 August, was present at the action of 5 October 1804 and was broken up in 1816.
- HMS Medusa was to have been a 46-gun fifth rate. She was ordered in 1816, reordered in 1830 and cancelled in 1831.
- HMS Medusa (1838) was a wooden paddle packet launched in 1838 and sold in 1872.
- HMS Medusa (1839) was an iron paddle gunboat launched in 1839 and wrecked in 1853.
- HMS Medusa (1888) was a Marathon-class cruiser launched in 1888, on harbour service from 1910, sold in 1920 and resold in 1921.
- HMS Medusa (1915) was a Medea-class destroyer, previously the Greek Lesvos. She was purchased in 1914, before being launched in 1915. She was abandoned after a collision with HMS Laverock and subsequently ran aground and was wrecked in 1916.
- HMS Medusa was an M29-class monitor, previously named HMS M29. She was renamed HMS Medusa in 1925, converted to a depot ship and renamed HMS Talbot in 1941, HMS Medway II in 1943 and back to HMS Medusa in 1944. She was sold in 1946 and broken up in 1947.
- HMS Medusa (1939) was an auxiliary minesweeper requisitioned in 1939 and transferred to the Royal Australian Navy as HMAS Mercedes in 1942.
- HMS Medusa (A353) was a harbour defence motor launch, launched in 1943 as ML 1387. She served in D-Day, was renamed BDB 76 in 1946, SDML 3516 in 1949 and Medusa in 1961. She was paid off in 1963, and is now a museum ship.

== Sources ==
- Colledge, J. J.; Warlow, Ben (2006) [1969]. Ships of the Royal Navy: The Complete Record of All Fighting Ships of the Royal Navy from the 15th Century to the Present (3rd Rev ed.). London: Chatham Publishing. ISBN 978-1-86176-281-8. OCLC 67375475.
