= List of shipwrecks in July 1867 =

The list of shipwrecks in July 1867 includes ships sunk, foundered, grounded, or otherwise lost during July 1867.

== 1 July ==
List of shipwrecks: 1 July 1867
Ship	State	Description
Waltron	United Kingdom	The ship sprang a leak and sank off the mouth of the River Tees. Her crew were rescued. She was on a voyage from Sunderland to Stockton-on-Tees, County Durham.

== 2 July ==
List of shipwrecks: 2 July 1867
Ship	State	Description
Rhone	United Kingdom	The steamship was holed by the anchor of the steamship Grecian (United Kingdom at Liverpool, Lancashire and developed a severe leak.

== 3 July ==
List of shipwrecks: 3 July 1867
Ship	State	Description
Jessie Amelia	United Kingdom	The schooner ran aground and sank off the Copeland Islands, County Down.
Martha Jane	United Kingdom	The brigantine was driven ashore in Portally Cove. She was on a voyage from Waterford to Cardiff, Glamorgan. She was refloated.

== 4 July ==
List of shipwrecks: 4 July 1867
Ship	State	Description
Thane of Fife	United Kingdom	The steamship ran aground at Broughty Ferry, Forfarshire. She was on a voyage from Tayport to Broughty Ferry. She was later refloated.
Vrouw Johanna	Netherlands	The tjalk was run into by the steamship Cleopatra (United Kingdom at Bath, Zeeland. She was declared a total loss.

== 5 July ==
List of shipwrecks: 5 July 1867
Ship	State	Description
Anna	United Kingdom	The brig was driven ashore at Östergarn, Gotland, Sweden. She was on a voyage from Riga, Russia to London. She was later refloated.
Gladiator	United Kingdom	The ship was damaged by fire at London.
Margaret	United Kingdom	The ship was driven ashore and capsized at Fleetwood, Lancashire. She was on a voyage from Quebec City, Canada to Fleetwood. She was refloated the next day and taken in to Fleetwood.
Oracle	United Kingdom	The schooner was wrecked on the French Reef. Her crew were rescued. She was on a voyage from Chiltepec, Mexico to Liverpool, Lancashire.
Patsey	United Kingdom	The steam yacht was run down and sunk in the River Thames at Gravesend, Kent by the steamship Albert Edward (United Kingdom). All on board were rescued.

== 6 July ==
List of shipwrecks: 6 July 1867
Ship	State	Description
Carlota	Italy	The brig was driven ashore at Gibraltar. She was on a voyage from Taganrog, Russia to Queenstown, County Cork, United Kingdom. She was refloated and towed in to Gibraltar.
David	United Kingdom	The ship collided with the steamship Halley (United Kingdom) and sank in the Atlantic Ocean. She was on a voyage from Poole, Dorset to Newfoundland.
Joseph Straker	United Kingdom	The steamship struck the pier at Havre de Grâce, Seine-Inférieure, France and sank at the bows. She was on a voyage from Newcastle upon Tyne, Northumberland to Havre de Grâce.
Mohawk	United Kingdom	The brig ran aground on the Hugelbaak, in the North Sea. She was on a voyage from Newcastle upon Tyne to Hamburg. She subsequently became a wreck.
Thomas Blythe	United Kingdom	The ship foundered in the Atlantic Ocean. Her crew were rescued. She was on a voyage from Liverpool, Lancashire to Shanghai, China.
Woodlands	United Kingdom	The ship ran aground and was wrecked in Skerry Sound. She was on a voyage from Stromness, Orkney Islands to Leith, Lothian.

== 7 July ==
List of shipwrecks: 7 July 1867
Ship	State	Description
Amazon	Prussia	The ship was driven ashore and wrecked near Thisted, Denmark with the loss of all but one of her crew. She was on a voyage from Newcastle upon Tyne, Northumberland, United Kingdom to Copenhagen, Denmark.
Rapid	(United Kingdom of Great Britain and Ireland) New Zealand	The schooner was wrecked at West Wanganui while leaving port.

== 8 July ==
List of shipwrecks: 8 July 1867
Ship	State	Description
Hermanes	France	The ship was lost near Larvik, Norway. She was on a voyage from Bordeaux, Gironde to Helsingør, Denmark.
Mary Nixon	United Kingdom	The steamship suffered an onboard explosion and caught fire whilst on a voyage from Cardiff, Glamorgan to Hamburg. Seven of her crew were severely wounded. She put in to Dartmouth, Devon.
Rapid	United Kingdom	The schooner sprang a leak and foundered. Her cre survived. She was on a voyage from Huelva, Spain to Liverpool, Lancashire.

== 9 July ==
List of shipwrecks: 9 July 1867
Ship	State	Description
Laura	(United Kingdom of Great Britain and Ireland) Jersey	The ship ran aground and capsized in the River Usk. She was on a voyage from Newport, Monmouthshire to Jersey.

== 10 July ==
List of shipwrecks: 10 July 1867
Ship	State	Description
Unnamed	United Kingdom	The Galway hooker was run down and sunk by Nebraska (United States) 10 nautical miles (19 km) off Cork with the loss of all five crew.

== 11 July ==
List of shipwrecks: 11 July 1867
Ship	State	Description
Edouard et Rose	France	The chasse-marée was wrecked on the Newcombe Sand, in the North Sea off the coast of Suffolk, United Kingdom. Her crew were rescued. She was on a voyage from Blyth, Northumberland, United Kingdom to a French port.
Margaret	United Kingdom	The schooner ran aground on the Newcombe Sand. She was on a voyage from Newcastle upon Tyne, Northumberland to Porto, Portugal. She was refloated and assisted in to Lowestoft, Suffolk in a sinking condition.
Triad	United Kingdom	The brig ran aground on the Middelgrunden. She was on a voyage from Scotland to Kronstadt, Russia. She was refloated on 13 July.
Walter Bain	United Kingdom	The ship was wrecked on the Cova Rubia Reef. She was on a voyage from Sydney, Nova Scotia, Canada to Matanzas, Cuba.

== 12 July ==
List of shipwrecks: 12 July 1867
Ship	State	Description
Flying Mist	United Kingdom	The paddle tug was run into by City of Nankin (United Kingdom) and sank in the Clyde downstream of Renfrew. Her crew survived. She was refloated the next day. Subsequently repaired and returned to service.
George	United Kingdom	The brigantine ran aground and capsized at Ely, Glamorgan. She was on a voyage from Cardiff, Glamorgan to Kinsale, County Cork.
Ocean Queen	United Kingdom	The ship departed from Trinidad for London. No further trace, presumed foundered with the loss of all hands.

== 14 July ==
List of shipwrecks: 14 July 1867
Ship	State	Description
Caledonia	United Kingdom	The ship ran aground at Sunderland, County Durham. She was on a voyage from Rochester, Kent to Sunderland. She was refloated the next day and towed in to Sunderland.
Genova	United Kingdom	The ship ran aground in Bull Bay. She was on a voyage from Liverpool, Lancashire to London. She was refloated, and put in to Penzance, Cornwall the next day for repairs.
Orb	United Kingdom	The brig ran aground on the Fahludd Reef, in the Baltic Sea. She was on a voyage from Vyborg, Grand Duchy of Finland to Hartlepool, County Durham. She was refloated on 16 July and resumed her voyage.

== 15 July ==
List of shipwrecks: 15 July 1867
Ship	State	Description
Elizabeth	United Kingdom	The barque was wrecked in Owick Bay in a typhoon with the loss of nine lives.
Jane Innes	United Kingdom	The ship was wrecked on Ouessant, Finistère, France. Her crew were rescued. She was on a voyage from St. Ubes, Portugal to London.
Ranger	United Kingdom	The brigantine was driven ashore and wrecked at Budleigh Salterton, Devon. Her eight crew were rescued by rocket apparatus.
Triton	United Kingdom	The ship was driven ashore at Kastrup, Denmark. She was on a voyage from Ljugarn, Gotland, Sweden to Shoreham-by-Sea, Sussex. She had been refloated by 19 June and resumed her voyage.
Wanderer	United Kingdom	The barque was driven ashore on Brier Island, Nova Scotia, British North America. She was on a voyage from Philadelphia, Pennsylvania, United States to Queenstown, County Cork.

== 16 July ==
List of shipwrecks: 16 July 1867
Ship	State	Description
Black Swan	(United Kingdom of Great Britain and Ireland) Victoria	The steamship was hit by the local paddle steamer, Luna, and sank in Hobsons Bay. Black Swan was on a voyage from Melbourne to Launceston, Tasmania.
Empreza	Brazil	The ship was driven ashore near the South Stack, Anglesey, United Kingdom. She was on a voyage from Pará to Liverpool, Lancashire, United Kingdom. She was refloated.
Rose	United Kingdom	The paddle steamer was wrecked on Horse Island, County Cork with the loss of nine of the 73-83 people on board. She was on a voyage from Sligo to Greenock, Renfrewshire.

== 17 July ==
List of shipwrecks: 17 July 1867
Ship	State	Description
Jeune Anglae	France	The ship was driven ashore at Boulogne, Pas-de-Calais. She was on a voyage from Swansea, Glamorgan, United Kingdom to Honfleur, Manche.
Lady Lyttleton	United Kingdom	The barque sank in the Emu Point Channel in Oyster Harbour near Albany, Western Australia.
Monarch	(United Kingdom of Great Britain and Ireland) Victoria	The barque ran aground on the western side of Port Phillip, Victoria and was wrecked. She was on a voyage from Melbourne to Newcastle, New South Wales.
Rose	United Kingdom	The Yorkshire Billyboy sank at Kilnsea, East Riding of Yorkshire. She was refloated on 19 July.

== 18 July ==
List of shipwrecks: 18 July 1867
Ship	State	Description
Harriet	(United Kingdom of Great Britain and Ireland) New Zealand	The brigantine was wrecked at Greymouth. She got into difficulties while being towed into port on the 12th, and was obliged to anchor by a sandbank. A gale on the 18th caused her to part her cables and drift onto a spit where she was at the mercy of the elements.

== 20 July ==
List of shipwrecks: 20 July 1867
Ship	State	Description
Occidental Star	United Kingdom	The ship ran aground on the Brake Sand, in the North Sea off the coast of Suffolk. She was on a voyage from Blyth, Northumberland to Beyrout, Ottoman Syria. She was refloated.
Redan	United Kingdom	The schooner ran aground on Jordan's Bank, in Liverpool Bay.
Thomas	United Kingdom	The Thames barge collided with the steamship Paraguay (United Kingdom) and sank in the River Thames at Blackwall, Middlesex.
Tirzah	United States	The ship was wrecked near Alibag, India. Nine crew were reported missing. She was on a voyage from Newcastle upon Tyne, Northumberland, United Kingdom to Bombay, India.
Wearmouth	United Kingdom	The collier, a steamship, foundered off Heligoland with the loss of all fifteen crew. She was on a voyage from Sunderland, County Durham to Hamburg.

== 21 July ==
List of shipwrecks: 21 July 1867
Ship	State	Description
Amethyst	United Kingdom	The ship sank off Hellevoetsluis, Zeeland, Netherlands. She was on a voyage from Newcastle upon Tyne, Northumberland to Vlaardingen, South Holland, Netherlands.
Knight of Snowdon	United Kingdom	The ship foundered off 18 nautical miles (33 km) Danger Point, Cape Colony. Her crew were rescued. She was on a voyage from Rangoon, Burma to Liverpool, Lancashire.

== 22 July ==
List of shipwrecks: 22 July 1867
Ship	State	Description
Dolfyn	Netherlands	The ship was wrecked on Hiiumaa, Russia. She was on a voyage from Leith, Lothian, United Kingdom to Saint Petersburg, Russia.
Elizabeth Gertrude	Netherlands	The ship was wrecked on Hiiumaa. Her crew were rescued. She was on a voyage from Middlesbrough, Yorkshire, United Kingdom to Saint Petersburg.
Frederick	(United Kingdom of Great Britain and Ireland) New Zealand	The barque was wrecked on a sandspit at Hokitika within hours of the brigantine Gratitude grounding on the same spit.
Gratitude	(United Kingdom of Great Britain and Ireland) New Zealand	The brigantine was wrecked on a sandspit at Hokitika within hours of the barque Frederick grounding on the same spit.
Jemima	United Kingdom	The brig ran aground near "Lappen", Denmark. She was on a voyage from Newcastle upon Tyne, Northumberland to Kronstadt, Russia. She was refloated and taken in to Helsingør, Denmark.
Orkney Lass	United Kingdom	The ship capsized in Lake Erie with the loss of all hands. She was on a voyage from Buffalo, New York, United States to Chatham, Kent.

== 23 July ==
List of shipwrecks: 23 July 1867
Ship	State	Description
Flintshire Lass	United Kingdom	The schooner ran aground on the Wicklow Bank, in the Irish Sea, and sank. Her crew were rescued.
Jantze Furnema	Flag unknown	The ship foundered off Reval, Russia. She was on a voyage from Saint Petersburg, Russia to Leith, Lothian, United Kingdom.

== 24 July ==
List of shipwrecks: 24 July 1867
Ship	State	Description
California	United Kingdom	The ship was driven ashore in the River Tweed. She was on a voyage from Kronstadt, Russia to South Shields, County Durham. She was refloated the next day and beached.

== 25 July ==
List of shipwrecks: 25 July 1867
Ship	State	Description
Maria	United Kingdom	The ship foundered in the North Sea off Heligoland. Her crew survived. She was on a voyage from Hamburg to South Shields, County Durham.

== 26 July ==
List of shipwrecks: 26 July 1867
Ship	State	Description
Arion	United Kingdom	The ship was wrecked near Gävle, Sweden. Her crew were rescued.
Cervantes	Spain	The ship was wrecked on the Anegada Reef, in the Bahamas. She was on a voyage from Spain to Puerto Rico.
Favourite, and Unity	United Kingdom	The ships collided and both sank in the North Sea. Their crews survived.
Maria	Prussia	The ship was abandoned in the North Sea 70 nautical miles (130 km) off Heligoland. Her crew were rescued. She was on a voyage from Hamburg to Newcastle upon Tyne, Northumberland, United Kingdom. She came ashore on Spiekeroog on 1 August and was wrecked.

== 28 July ==
List of shipwrecks: 28 July 1867
Ship	State	Description
Maria	United Kingdom	The ship sank off Heligoland. Her nine crew were rescued by the smack Pet (United Kingdom). Maria was on a voyage from Hamburg to Newcastle upon Tyne, Northumberland.

== 29 July ==
List of shipwrecks: 29 July 1867
Ship	State	Description
Anna Cook	United Kingdom	The smack was wrecked on the Lether Rock, in the Pentland Firth. Her crew were rescued. She was on a voyage from Ardrossan, Ayrshire to Dear Sound.
Arkansas	United Kingdom	The barque foundered 24 nautical miles (44 km) off "Zemara" with the loss of four lives. She was on a voyage from Alexandria, Egypt to Falmouth, Cornwall, United Kingdom.
Dyson	United Kingdom	The ship was wrecked at Arkhangelsk, Russia.

== 30 July ==
List of shipwrecks: 30 July 1867
Ship	State	Description
Avoca	United Kingdom	The steamship ran aground near the Poolbeg Lighthouse, County Dublin. Her passengers were taken off by the steamship Anne Liffey (United Kingdom). Avoca was on a voyage from London to Dublin.
Isabella Forbes	United Kingdom	The ship ran aground and was wrecked. Her crew survived. She was on a voyage from Sunderland, County Durham to Aberdeen.
Nelly	United Kingdom	The ship was wrecked on the Counts, in the River Severn. Her crew were rescued. She was on a voyage from Gloucester to Bideford, Devon.
Tientsin	United Kingdom	The barque was run down and sunk near Woosung, China by the steamship Malacca (United Kingdom).

== 31 July ==
List of shipwrecks: 31 July 1867
Ship	State	Description
Alliance	United Kingdom	The brig ran aground on the Goodwin Sands, Kent. She was on a voyage from Cardiff, Glamorgan to Hamburg. She was refloated and resumed her voyage.
Amy	United Kingdom	The ship ran aground on the Mussel Scarp. She was on a voyage from the River Tyne to King's Lynn, Norfolk. She was refloated and towed back to the River Tyne.
Vistula	(United Kingdom of Great Britain and Ireland) New Zealand	The 139-ton brigantine went ashore during a heavy gale at Oamaru. Several other ships and boats ran aground during the same gale but — unlike the Vistula — were successfully refloated.
Windflower	United Kingdom	The ship was driven ashore in the Dardanelles. She was on a voyage from Sulina, Ottoman Empire to Falmouth, Cornwall. She was refloated.

== Unknown date ==
List of shipwrecks: Unknown date in July 1867
Ship	State	Description
Augusta Schneider	United Kingdom	The barque struck a sunken rock off Saint Domingo. She put in to St. Jago de Cuba, Cuba on 13 June. She was consequently condemned.
Diedrich Plentzien	Flag unknown	The ship was wrecked. Her crew were rescued. She was on a voyage from Singapore, Straits Settlements to Sydney, New South Wales.
Dreadnought	United Kingdom	The ship was abandoned in the Atlantic Ocean. Her crew were rescued by the steamship Heaton Hall (United Kingdom). Dreadnought was on a voyage from Pomaron, Portugal to Liverpool, Lancashire.
Ethel	United States	The ship ran aground on a voyage from Hong Kong. She was refloated and put back to Hong Kong, where she arrived on 25 July.
Exertion	United Kingdom	The brigantine was abandoned in the Atlantic Ocean before 29 July.
George	(United Kingdom of Great Britain and Ireland) New South Wales	The schooner was wrecked.
Glendower	United Kingdom	The ship ran aground on the Pickles Reef. She was on a voyage from New Orleans, Louisiana, United States to Liverpool.
Hilnia	United Kingdom	The ship was wrecked. She was on a voyage from Jamaica to Belize City, British Honduras.
Howard	United Kingdom	The ship sank in the North Sea before 25 July. Her crew were rescued by Supply (United Kingdom).
Krimpenewaard	Netherlands	The barque was driven ashore and wrecked in Algoa Bay.
Maravi	United Kingdom	The barque foundered off Hong Kong. She was on a voyage from Shanghai to Newchang, China.
Minerva	Bremen	The full-rigged ship ran aground in the Yangon River.
Nelly Fogarty	United Kingdom	The ship was destroyed by fire at sea.
Neptune	United Kingdom	The ship was abandoned in the North Sea. She was on a voyage from Seaham, County Durham to Colchester, Essex.
North American	Canada	The ship was driven ashore on Anticosti Island, Nova Scotia. She was refloated on 27 July and towed in to Gaspé, Quebec.
Ornen	Netherlands	The ship was driven ashore near Visby, Gotland, Sweden. She was on a voyage from Riga, Russia to Amsterdam, North Holland. She was later refloated and taken in to Ljugarn, Gotland.
Pakwan	United Kingdom	The clipperstruck a sunken rock in the Kimpal Passage before 14 July. She was on a voyage from Foochow, China to London. She put back to Foochow for repairs.
Palmera	France	The ship was lost off "Cape Junis", Brazil. She was on a voyage from Marseille, Bouches-du-Rhône to Rio de Janeiro, Brazil.
Pampelmousses	United Kingdom	The ship ran aground on the Karang Hodjee Shoal.
Queen of the Deep	United Kingdom	The ship was destroyed by fire at sea. Her crew were rescued. She was on a voyage from Calcutta, India to Liverpool.
Saint Francisco de Paola	Haiti	The ship was driven ashore at Gonaïves. She was on a voyage from Port-au-Prince to Falmouth, Cornwall, United Kingdom. She was refloated and taken in to Nassau, Bahamas in a leaky condition.
Sir Robert Brook	United Kingdom	The ship ran aground on the French Reef. She was on a voyage from Havana, Cuba to Falmouth. She was refloated and taken in to Key West, Florida, United States.
Spirit of the Deep	United Kingdom	The ship was wrecked on "Pulo Malara". Her crew were rescued. She was on a voyage from Moulmein, Burma to Queenstown, County Cork.
Susanna Temple	United Kingdom	The ship was wrecked neat Matanzas, Cuba. She was on a voyage from Havana to "Calbarien".
Vulture	United Kingdom	The ship was abandoned at sea. She was on a voyage from Liverpool to Halifax, Nova Scotia, Canada. She was discovered by Calista Haws (United Kingdom), which put a skeleton crew on board. They too her in to Liverpool, where she arrived on 22 July.
Walter Baine	(United Kingdom of Great Britain and Ireland) New South Wales	The brig was wrecked on the Coxgarruleas Reef. She was on a voyage from Sydney to Havana.
Water Sprite	United Kingdom	The ship was abandoned in the Atlantic Ocean with the loss of one of her eight crew. Survivors were rescued by Clarissa (United Kingdom). Water Sprite was on a voyage from Surinam to Liverpool.
