= Fanny Nicholson =

Coordinates: 35.083°S 117.9367°E

History

United Kingdom
- Name: Fanny Nicholson
- Owner: Captain John McArthur and William Andrews, Hobart
- Builder: John Pile, Hartlepool
- Launched: 17 June 1855
- Fate: Wrecked Frenchman's Bay, 22 November 1872

General characteristics
- Class & type: Barque
- Tons burthen: Old Act: 356 (bm); New Act (post 1836): 285 (bm)
- Length: 120 ft 0 in (36.6 m)
- Beam: 25 ft 5 in (7.7 m)
- Draft: 15 ft 7 in (4.7 m)

Fanny Nicholson was an iron-framed, timber-clad barque that sank in 1872 in Frenchman's Bay in King George Sound near Albany in the Great Southern region of Western Australia.

The barque was built in Hartlepool in County Durham. It was fitted with one deck, a poop deck, an elliptical stern and a figurehead in the shape of a woman. It was copper-fastened, sheathed with felt and yellow metal. The ship required repairs in 1856 and 1861 for damage incurred while in operation. During its early years of service it was sailed from Liverpool to destinations in South America and was sailed to Australia arriving in 1859.

It was operating as a whaler out of Hobart by 1870, when her owners included Captain John McArthur and William Andrews.

The ship struck a whale on 21 November 1872 while en route from Hobart to Albany. After tying the whale to the side of the vessel it proceeded to Frenchman's Bay where it anchored to process the whale. The following night a gale rose from the southeast and it broke two anchor cables and foundered close to shore at Goode Beach.

A total of 70 tuns (66,775 litres) of sperm oil, the sails, rigging, whaling equipment, provisions and other contents were recovered from the wreck and shipped to Hobart for auction. The remains of the vessel can sometimes be seen in shallow water after heavy storms.

== See also ==
- List of shipwrecks of Australia § Western Australia
