= Geltwood =

Ship wrecked off South Australia in 1876

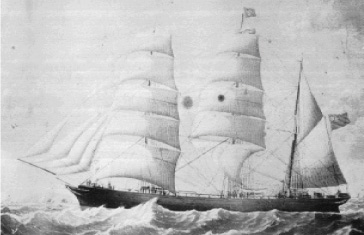
- Geltwood by J. Witham

History

United Kingdom
- Name: Geltwood
- Owner: John Sprott of Harrington, England, U.K
- Port of registry: Workington, Cumberland U.K
- Route: Liverpool - Melbourne
- Builder: R. Williamson & Sons shipyard at Harrington
- Launched: 18 January 1876
- Maiden voyage: 23 March 1876
- Out of service: 1876
- Fate: Wrecked off the south east of South Australia 14 June 1876

General characteristics
- Class & type: Iron Barque
- Tonnage: 1056 tons(Net)
- Length: 215.5 ft (65.7 m)
- Beam: 33.78 ft (10.30 m)
- Draft: 6.4 m (21 ft)
- Depth: 220.99 ft (67.36 m)
- Sail plan: 3 masts
- Crew: 28

Geltwood was an iron-hulled barque that was shipwrecked on or around 14 June 1876 during a storm on a remote stretch of the south east coast of South Australia.

== Ship ==
Geltwood' was an iron-hulled three-masted barque built at R. Williamson & Sons shipyard at Harrington, Cumberland, England, for owner John Sprott of Harrington.

The ship was 215.5 ft (65.7 m) in length, with a beam of 33.78 ft (10.30 m) and depth of 220.99 ft (67.36 m). She was a sister ship of the Mallsgate (also wrecked on the Australian coast) and Inglewood.

She was registered at Workington, Cumberland, and launched on 18 January 1876.

== Maiden voyage ==
Geltwood departed from Liverpool on her maiden voyage on 23 March 1876, bound for Melbourne, carrying cargo worth £18,400, comprising tobacco, tinplate, ale, crockery, galvanised iron, fencing wire, and roof slates.

She was under the command of Captain F. F. Harrington, who was accompanied by his wife and daughter. It seems that they may have been the only passengers, along with 28 crew.

== Wrecking and aftermath ==
Nearing the completion of her voyage, on 14 June 1876, during a large storm blowing in from the south-west, described as an "awful tempest", the ship struck a reef 12 mi (19 km) south of Rivoli Bay, South Australia, capsized and broke up. No rescue was possible, although some reported that distress signals were sent. The wreck occurred 1.6 km (0.99 mi) from shore, south-east of Southend, South Australia, at 37°37′36″S 140°10′51″E.

There were no survivors, and the wreck was not reported to police for a further two weeks. On 5 July 1876 James Sparkes, a boundary rider from Benara Station, reported the wreck to the Millicent Police. There were no survivors, and only four bodies were found, within the following four months. They were interred in the old Millicent burial ground, with only the passenger James Nelson with a marble headstone. Dead livestock, three boats, and some sea chests were also washed up.

The events surrounding Geltwood are made infamous by reports of looting by some locals. Two people were convicted of stealing (mostly tobacco) and sentenced to two and a half years in gaol, with several others were handed fines to pay.

The wreck was later auctioned for salvage, and in 1877 divers recovered 22 tons of the cargo, which was auctioned off.

== Wreck site and relics ==
In December 1980, Lance Chambers, a local fisherman, spotted the wreck from the surface. Two years later, Mick Galpin dived to the site of the wreck, and in February 1983 John Deeprose and John Charles dived the wreck and reported the find to the minister responsible for the Historic Shipwrecks Act 1976. The Geltwood was declared an Historic Shipwreck for its archaeological significance and as well as its historical significance to the south-east, thereby protecting it under law. A permit has to be obtained to dive the site, and diving there can be dangerous.

In 1984 an anchor was recovered, and this, along with other memorabilia from Geltwood can be viewed at the Millicent National Trust Museum (aka Millicent Living History Museum).

One of the Geltwood anchors can be viewed in Southend at a lookout on Cape Buffon drive, along with a memorial to all those who have lost their lives at sea.

Some Geltwood artefacts are also displayed in the Beachport museum.

A number of Geltwood artefacts are described on the Australasian Underwater Cultural Heritage Database, including teapots, figurines, a telescope, portholes, and various bottles.

== Documentary ==
In 2026, director Lyndal Redman, whose father had dived on the wreck, released her documentary film about the ship, titled Geltwood, with screenings taking place on the Limestone Coast in September.

== See also ==
- List of shipwrecks of Australia
