= Belinda (ship) =

Brig wrecked in 1824 off Western Australia

History

United Kingdom
- Name: Belinda
- Launched: 1810
- Fate: Wrecked in 1824

General characteristics
- Tonnage: 160 long tons (160 t)
- Complement: 29

Belinda was a brig that was wrecked in 1824 off the coast of Western Australia.

The brig of 160 long tons (160 t) was built in Great Yarmouth, England in 1810. It arrived in Sydney on 23 February 1824, captained by Thomas Coverdale and crewed by 28 sailors. The ship sailed for the sealing grounds of Recherché Archipelago from Sydney on 17 May 1824 and on arrival was wrecked on 19 July 1824 off Middle Island at 34.09009°S 123.21031°E.

While the ship was completely wrecked, two small ships boats were saved and the crew attempted to return to Sydney. After travelling 320 kilometres (200 mi), one of the boats was swamped and sank. The party split into two with one half walking back to Middle Island in the Recherché Archipelago and the others keeping time with them in the remaining boat. After considerable struggle they returned to Middle Island where they were found in an exhausted state with all their provisions gone by the sealing brig Nereus, under the command of Thomas Swindles on 8 December 1824. All the crew were rescued and returned to Sydney on 11 March 1825. In 1826 the schooner Liberty undertook salvage work and returned to Sydney with a quantity of iron work, including two sea anchors.

== See also ==
- List of Western Australian shipwrecks
