= Moltke (1870) =

Coordinates: 19.153745°S 146.869344°E

- Wreck of the Moltke (Early 20th Century)

History
- Name: Moltke
- Owner: Fritze & Gerdes, Germany (1870-?); Burns, Philp and Co Ltd, Townsville (?-1911); McCabe, Dr, Magnetic Island (1911-)
- Builder: Godeffroy-Zeit, Hamburg
- Yard number: 216
- Completed: 1870
- Out of service: 1911
- Fate: Wrecked off Cape Bowling Green (1890); Refloated and hulked; Scuttled at Geoffrey Bay (1911)

General characteristics
- Type: Three-masted Iron hulled Barque
- Tonnage: 828 NRT
- Beam: 9.8 m
- Crew: 14 (1890)

The Moltke was a three-masted barque built in Hamburg, Germany in 1870. The vessel was wrecked off the coast of northern Queensland, Australia in 1890 before being refloated and hulked. In 1911 the vessel was scuttled off Geoffrey Bay, Magnetic Island. The wreck of the vessel now hosts a wide range of underwater life and is a popular open-water dive site.

== History ==
Built by Godeffroy-Zeit in Hamburg, Germany in 1870 for the company Fritze & Gerdes, the Moltke was a three-masted, iron hulled, barque. The vessel sailed from Germany to Townsville, Australia in 1890 and was described as "beautiful, spotlessly clean and expensively furnished.". Having docked at Townsville to unload cargo and passengers the vessel continued onto Rockhampton. On 1891-04-03, en route to Rockhampton, at the northern end of the Flinders Channel to the east of Cape Bowling Green, the vessel ran aground upon a reef. The crew abandoned the vessel and returned to Townsville.

The vessel was refloated and towed back to Townsville port by the SS Christina Gollan, the salvage paid for by a syndicate of local investors led by a Mr. Page of the Port of Townsville. The contents and cargo of the vessel were then sold at a profit, with the vessel returning to service with Burns, Philp and Company Limited used as a coal hulk. In 1911, Dr McCabe, a local dentist who owned property at Geoffrey Bay purchased the hulk with the intent to scuttle the vessel to protect the jetty located in the bay. An explosives expert, William Bright, was contracted to sink the vessel. Accounts of the event suggest that while the vessel was being towed into place, the fuse for the explosives was lit prematurely by an intoxicated Bright. The tug boat pilot was able to release the tow lines and pilot clear of the vessel. However, the explosives aboard the vessel detonated and scuttled the boat in the wrong location and 10m depth.
