= Geoffrey Bay =

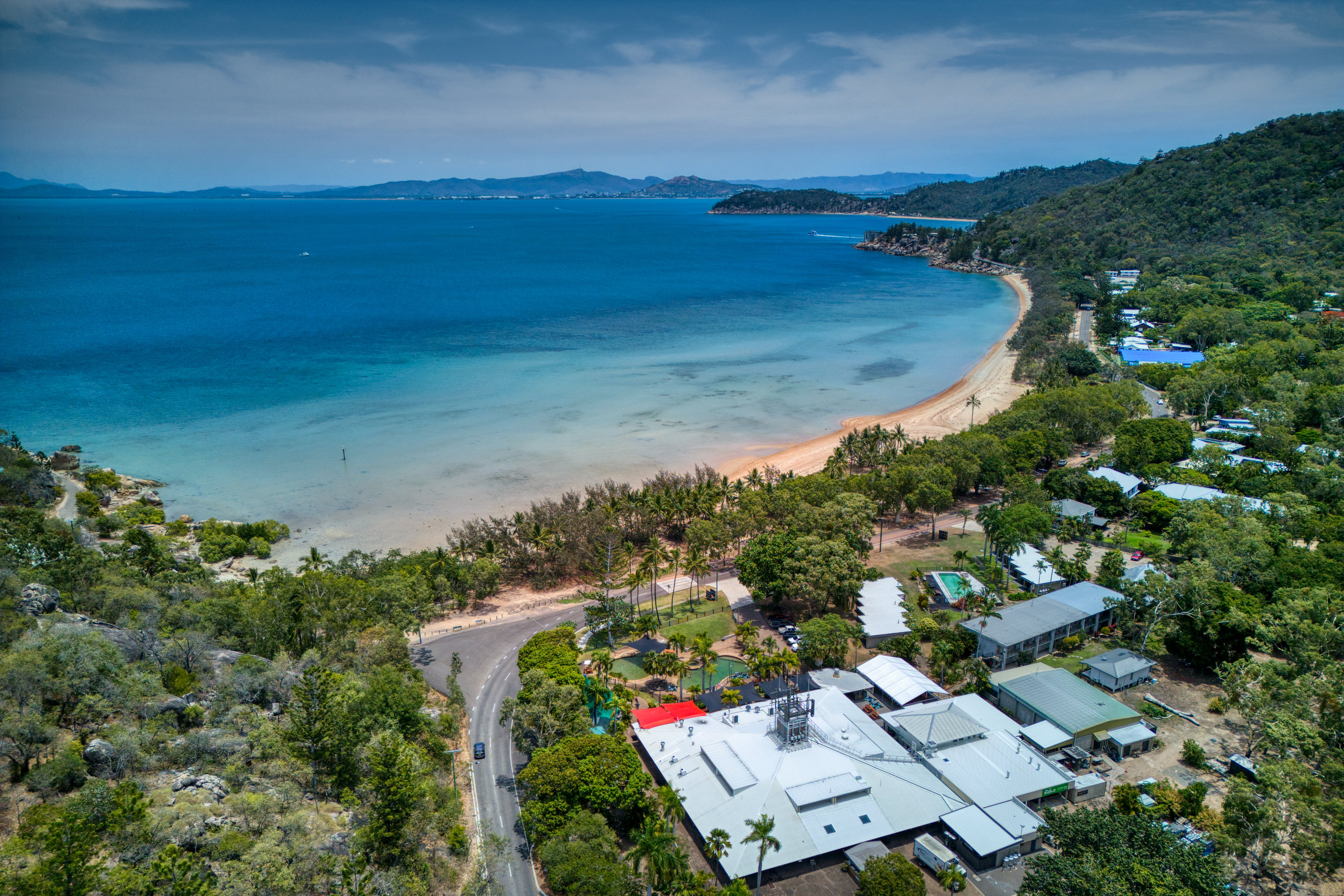

- Location within Queensland
- Coordinates: 19.155°S 146.865°E
- Country: Australia
- State: Queensland
- City: City of Townsville

Geoffrey Bay is a bay with a large sweeping beach on Magnetic Island, Queensland, Australia. It is offshore from the suburb of Arcadia.

The wreck of the sailing barque the Moltke can be found in the bay.
