= Lady Lyttleton =

Barque sunk near Albany, Western Australia in 1867

Coordinates: 34.9977°S 117.9503°E

History

United Kingdom
- Name: Lady Lyttleton
- Owner: Harold Smith
- Acquired: 1866
- Stricken: Sank 1867
- Fate: Foundered 17 July 1867

General characteristics
- Class & type: Barque
- Tons burthen: 178 tons
- Length: 94.4 feet (29 m)
- Beam: 21.1 ft (6.4 m)
- Draught: 9.7 ft (3.0 m)

Lady Lyttleton was a barque that sunk in the Emu Point Channel in Oyster Harbour near Albany in the Great Southern region of Western Australia.

== History ==
The ship was built as Sultan, with a female figurehead and a single deck. It was registered in Sydney in 1861 by the owners Alex Young and John Howard. In 1866 the vessel was sold to Harold Selwyn Smith in Melbourne and registered at the port there.

On the ship's final voyage, in the command of John McArthur, it departed Adelaide on 29 May 1867 with three passengers and a cargo of 18 tonnes (40,000 lb) of bran, 10 tonnes (22,000 lb) of pollard, 450 tonnes (992,000 lb) of barley and other goods. It entered King George Sound on 16 June and was leaking badly. The crew had already jettisoned part of the cargo with the rest being unloaded in Albany before it sailed to Emu Point for repairs.

Lady Lyttleton was hove down to the shore by tackles from the masthead but the ship slipped and then foundered and sank on 17 July 1867. It was later abandoned. The wreck was rediscovered by divers in 1971. The Western Australian Museum surveyed and partially excavated the site in 1978 and in 1990 with several artefacts being retrieved.

== See also ==
- List of places on the State Register of Heritage Places in the City of Albany
- List of shipwrecks of Australia § Western Australia
