= PS Clonmel =

Coordinates: 38°44′44″S 146°40′37″E

Clonmel was a three-masted wooden paddle steamer built in Birkenhead, England, in 1836. Clonmel was one of the first steam-powered vessels on the Australian coast. It ran aground in the early hours of 2 January 1841, or the 3rd. and was wrecked on what is now known as Clonmel Island in Corner Inlet, Victoria. This was only its second voyage from Sydney.

The wreck of the Clonmel, and the subsequent exploration of Corner Inlet, led to establishment of the towns of Port Albert, Tarraville and Alberton.

== History ==
Clonmel was built in England and launched in 1836, at Birkenhead, near Liverpool. She was 155 feet (47 m) long and about 40 feet (12 m) broad across the paddle boxes. She had two 110 horsepower engines, and was rated at 500 tons burthen, so with 300 tons of cargo she could steam for five days.

She ran around the British Isles for about 15 months before being sold to Sydney owners, was newly copper sheathed and despatched under Captain Tollervey, leaving The Downs on 20 May and arriving in Sydney on 5 October 1840. She had been purchased to run between Sydney, Melbourne and Launceston, with the first trip scheduled for 17 November, but was postponed several times for modifications, notably to allow for the smaller size of coals from Newcastle.

== First voyage ==
After a series of delays, she left Sydney at 6 p.m. on 1 December 1840, arrived at Port Phillip around 8 am on 9 December, having a scheduled stop at Batemans Bay en route. She left for Launceston and returned. She left for Sydney 15 or 16 December but ran short of coal and was obliged to put in at Batemans Bay, a delay of two days, arriving at Sydney on the evening of 22 December.

== Second voyage ==
Clonmel left Sydney on 30 December, and rounded the South Head against a strong southerly wind. On the morning of 1 January she sighted Ram Head, Victoria, by which time the wind had dropped and the sea was smooth. Captain Tollervey steered for Wilsons Promontory. She struck the sandbank at Corner Inlet at a speed of 10 knots between 3 and 4 am on Saturday 2 January.

Attempts to reverse the ship out of this situation failed, despite dropping anchors and throwing cargo overboard. The whole of the passengers and crew were transferred to the mainland by whaleboat, the captain being the last to leave. The crew followed orders impeccably, though the firemen were noted as at one stage "behaving disgracefully".

Shelter and provisions were ferried ashore and a comfortable camp set up. The following morning a volunteer party of five crew and two of the passengers, D. C. Simson and T. D. Edwards, set out for Melbourne in the whaleboat. Early on the third day they met with a cutter, whose captain brought them to William's Town.

The crew and passengers were rescued without loss or injury, though the captain sustained a serious ankle injury. Among the passengers was a Mr. C. Robinson of the Union Bank, who had charge of £3,000 of the Bank's notes, lost, believed stolen; Melbourne merchant Michael Cashmore and his bride; Thomas Walker and Mrs. Walker, their four children and a servant; and Hobart merchant Mr. T. Goodwin, of Hamilton & Goodwin, to whom most of the Clonmel's cargo belonged.

A reason ascribed to the misfortune was the ship's mate having reset the course several points to the west ("he is too afraid of the land") while the captain was below, consequently when the captain returned to the deck the ship was 17 miles closer to land than expected.
