= Argument (ship) =

Australian sloop wrecked in 1809

Argument was an Australian sloop of some 8 tons, built in Sydney and registered on 8 October 1800.

In March 1809 Argument, Experiment and Hazard left Pittwater, New South Wales, bound for Sydney with cargoes of wheat. On 17 March, a squall arose and the master of Argument, Benjamin Pate, watched as Hazard was driven ashore and wrecked. Deciding to avoid a similar fate he attempted to run for Broken Bay but missed the entrance and struck Short Reef, where Argument was wrecked. All three people on board — Pate, his hand James Dicey, and a passenger, Mary Kirk — drowned.
