= SS Myola =

Screw steamer built in UK

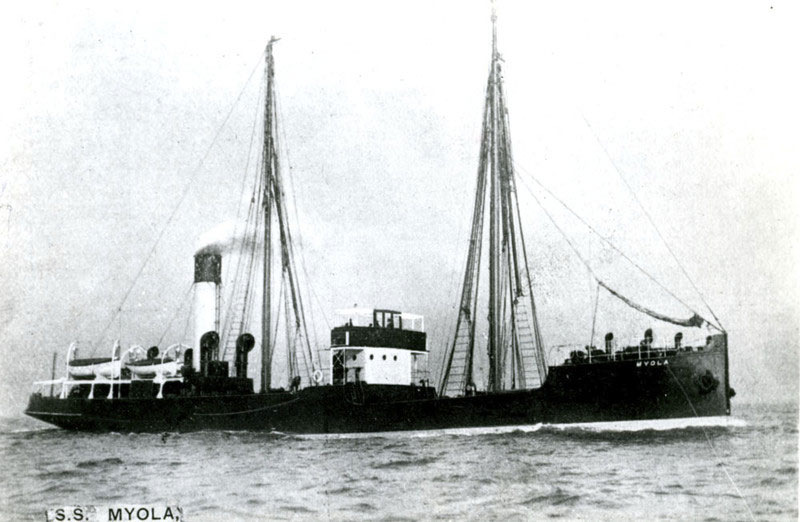

History

Australia
- Name: SS Myola (1913–1919)
- Owner: Australian Steamships Ltd. (Howard Smith)
- Builder: Smiths Dock Company, South Bank, Middlesbrough, Northeast England
- Launched: 16 August 1913
- Completed: 1913
- Identification: Ship official number 132448
- Fate: foundered 2 April 1919 off Long Reef
- Notes: location of wreck 33.7612°S 151.36338°E

General characteristics
- Type: Collier, screw steamer
- Tonnage: 655 GRT
- Length: 180 ft (55 m)
- Beam: 29.1 ft (8.9 m)
- Draught: 11.6 ft (3.5 m)
- Installed power: 2 × scotch boilers; 150 horsepower
- Propulsion: triple-expansion steam engine; 1 × screw propeller
- Sail plan: two masts

SS Myola was a 655-ton screw steamer, 55 metres long, built in Middlesbrough in the United Kingdom. Myola, could unfurl sails on her two tall masts and gain a knot or so of additional speed when the wind suited.

Myola left Newcastle, New South Wales, on 1 April 1919 bound for Sydney. The cargo was 675 tons of coal.

Captain Higgins replaced his usual crew, quarantined in Sydney after an epidemic of influenza. A thirty mile per hour south-easterly wind created heavy seas. When off Long Reef near Sydney, Myola was struck by a heavy wave. Water entered the engine room. At about 12:15 a.m., the ship suddenly lurched to starboard, and it then came over to port and came to rest on its beam ends, with water over the well deck. Subsequently the ship foundered, sinking rapidly. Four miles behind, the steamer South Bulli observed distress flares and assisted picking up survivors. Four people died.

A subsequent Court of Marine Inquiry found that the foundering was caused by the coal cargo "shifting" and from an accumulation of water in the bilges. It was also critical of the second engineer for not starting the pumps earlier or informing superior officers of the situation.

Myola was one of three coastal steam colliers (or 'sixty-milers') to be lost, in the six-months from Dec 1918 to May 1919. The other two were Undola and Tuggerah. As a result, a Royal Commission was set up to inquire into the coastal coal carrying trade and the loss of the three ships.

The Royal Commission's finding on the loss of Myola, differed from that of the earlier inquiry. It rejected 'shifting coal' as the cause of the loss and found that the amount of water in the bilges was not significant. Relying upon the calculations of a naval architect and evidence that Myola was up to 75-tons over its theoretical deadweight tonnage upon leaving Newcastle, the finding on the cause of the loss of Myola was:

"the Myola having had an amount of loose water in her [ballast] tanks on leaving Newcastle which reduced the righting levers considerably and rendered her unstable and eventually caused the loss. This theory meets the facts more consistently than any others which has been advanced."

The reason for there being free water in the ballast tanks was not known—the crew believed that the tanks were empty— but the Royal Commission was, in its own words, "forced to consider the possible neglect to keep filling valves screwed down when not in use as a possible cause of the disaster".

Contemporary reports stated Myola sunk off Sydney Heads. However, the wreck of Myola was found in 1994, in 48 metres of water off Long Reef, lying on its port side. Damage to the propeller indicates that the engine was still running as the ship foundered, which is consistent with accounts given by the crew.
