= Hazard (ship) =

Australian sloop that sank in 1809

Coordinates: 33.54227°S 151.3485°E

Hazard was an Australian sloop wrecked in 1809.

Hazard was of unknown tonnage, probably built in Sydney in 1800. It was owned by Thorley & Griffiths and had been chartered to Lusk.

In March 1809, three ships, Argument, Experiment, and Hazard left Pittwater, New South Wales, bound for Sydney with a cargo of wheat. A squall arose and Hazard was driven onto Box Head, 2 miles (3.2 km) north of Barrenjoey, New South Wales. Her master, Andrew Lusk, got into the ship's boat but was unable to persuade his single crew member, a boy, to join him. The boy was washed overboard and was dragged from the surf by some Aborigines. Lusk attempted to make it to shore but the boat capsized and Lusk drowned.
