= Clonmel Island =

Island in Victoria, Australia

- Location within Shire of Wellington Location within Australia
- Etymology: PS Clonmel

Geography
- Location: Bass Strait
- Coordinates: 38°42′42″S 146°42′16″E

Administration
- Australia
- State: Victoria

Clonmel Island is a sand island in Corner Inlet, in the Gippsland region of Victoria, Australia. Located within the Nooramunga Marine and Coastal Park, it is a part of a complex of barrier islands that protects a large marine embayment from the pounding waves of the Bass Strait. It is one of the five major islands of Corner Inlet, a Ramsar site, and hosts significant breeding colonies of Caspian terns, crested terns, and Australian fairy terns.

== History ==
The island is named after the paddle steamer PS Clonmel which was wrecked in the Port Albert Entrance to Corner Inlet, immediately east of the island, in 1841.
