= Michael Cashmore (businessman) =

Merchant

Michael Cashmore Hebrew: מיכאל קאשמור (7 March 1815 – 17 October 1886) was a merchant, the first Jewish settler of Melbourne, Victoria, and remembered for his haberdashery business in Melbourne's first brick building, "Cashmore's Corner" at 1 Elizabeth Street.

== History ==
Cashmore was born in England, and emigrated to New South Wales in 1836, working initially for a Mr. Emanuel in George Street, Sydney near The Rocks, then went into business on his own account in the same street.

In June 1840 he left Sydney on the Bright Planet for Port Phillip to investigate commercial possibilities in the newly founded town of Melbourne. He returned to Sydney in October on the Water Lily.

Cashmore married Elizabeth "Betsy" Solomon (1821–1898) in Sydney on 9 December 1840, and later that month boarded the PS Clonmel, bound for Port Phillip. The ship was famously wrecked on 2 January 1841; all survived but their considerable cargo was lost. He, in partnership with Samuel Emmanuel, opened a shop in the first brick building in Melbourne, owned by Alexander Brunton on Elizabeth Street, on the north-east corner of the Collins intersection. Cashmore called it "Victoria House", but it was better known as "Cashmore's Corner", and there they also lived before establishing a home at Albert Park, Victoria. From 1844 Cashmore ran the business alone.

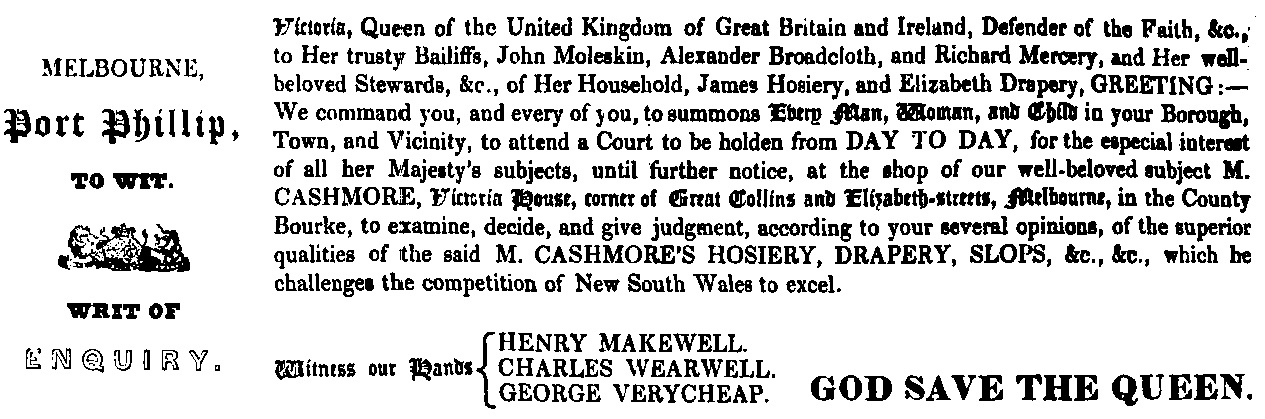
A newspaper's comment on this advertisement was: "We should explain that Cashmore is a real name. If the syllables were transposed it would, of course, be more appropriate, as, like ail true traders, he is tolerably anxious [for a profit]"

In 1843 Cashmore, Solomon Benjamin and Asher Hymen Hart were, as trustees, allocated an acre (0.40 ha) of land in Melbourne for a Jewish cemetery and the following year, 76 perches (a little under ½ acre or 0.2 ha) for a synagogue. Hart was, in 1841, the founder of the Jewish Congregational Society, with Cashmore its first President.

In 1841 he was elected to the Melbourne City Council (for the Latrobe ward), the first Jew to achieve such a position. He resigned in 1848 for reasons not declared, but apparently distressing for him. He was the first Jewish Justice of the Peace appointed in the colony. He was appointed Justice of the Peace and Police Magistrate, again the first Jew.

He was appointed Inspector of the Elizabeth Street Meat Market for the City Council of Melbourne sometime before May 1874, also associated with the Central Board of Health. He retired from business around the same time, and the building was taken over by William Alston, a tobacconist, who rebuilt the premises, and gradually "Cashmore's Corner" got to be called "Alston's Corner". Alston purchased the adjoining block on Collins Street and enlarged the building yet again, and in 1912 purchased the corner block from the Brunton estate.

He was a leading spokesman for Jewish faith, who felt snubbed when omitted from an 1854 grant to churches. In 1855 he was a member of a committee formed to establish a Jews' seminary. He was president of the Jewish Mutual Aid Society. In February 1886 he was compelled to cease work due to ill health, and was granted leave with full pay for twelve months. He died six months later, leaving a widow and eight grown up children.

== Other interests ==
He was a director and major shareholder in the Melbourne Gas and Coke Company. He was also a promoter and director of the National Bank of Australasia.

He was connected with a number of societies and charitable institutions, and a longtime member and past master of the Lodge Of Australia Felix (founded 1839 in Melbourne).

== Family ==
Michael Cashmore (7 March 1815 – 17 October 1886) married Elizabeth "Betsy" Solomon (14 June 1821 – 9 February 1898) in Sydney on 9 December 1840. Betsy was a half-sister of Emanuel Solomon MLC (1800–1873) and Vaiben Solomon (1802–1860). Their family included:

- Alice Cashmore (11 May 1842 – ) married Henry Isaacs ( – ) on 23 March 1859 lived in Castlemaine, then Yarra, later London.
- Joseph Michael Cashmore (7 November 1843 – 16 April 1931) married cousin Esther Solomon (17 April 1852 – 27 September 1930) on 19 June 1877
- Esther Cashmore (14 June 1845 – 7 December 1920) married Henry Cohen (13 November 1840 – 6 March 1918) of New Zealand on 5 February 1868, later of "Newington", Hoddle-street, Richmond, Victoria.
- Samuel Herbert Cashmore (1847 – 9 July 1931) married Deborah Alice Morrell ( – 17 October 1951) on 20 January 1880. He famously operated as a bookmaker, though blind from an early age; his clerk was deaf and dumb.
- Isaac Michael Cashmore (22 April 1849 – 15 April 1890) married Louisa Perrett ( 4 June 1855 – 15 Dec 1890) Marriage 4 May 1882, lived Fitzroy, Victoria
- Henry Cashmore (25 February 1851 – 5 October 1875)
- Rebecca Cashmore (25 September 1853 – 15 February 1918) married cousin Emanuel Solomon (7 October 1855 – 12 May 1938) on 7 June 1882.
- Alfred Cashmore (7 August 1855 – 18 March 1885)
- Sarah Cashmore (July 1857 – 1954)
- Louisa Cashmore (1860 – 28 September 1936) married Julius Magnus (21 December 1858 – 26 February 1944) on 4 February 1885, lived St. Kilda, then Caulfield.
