= Mary Ann (ship) =

Several vessels have been named Mary Ann:

- The ship that became Mary Ann (or Mary Anne) was built in 1772 in France and the British captured her c. 1778. Her name may have been Ariadne until 1786 when she started to engage in whaling. Next, as Mary Ann, she made one voyage transporting convicts to New South Wales from England. In 1794 the French captured her, but by 1797 she was back in her owners' hands. She then made a slave trading voyage. Next, she became a West Indiaman, trading between London or Liverpool to Demerara. It was on one of those voyages in November 1801 that a French privateer captured her.
- Mary Ann (1789 ship) was launched at Liverpool. She made nine voyages as a slave ship in the triangular trade in enslaved people. In January 1795, she successfully repulsed an attack by a French privateer in a sanguinary single ship action. She was last listed in 1818.
- Mary Ann (1806 ship) was launched in 1806 at Chester. She made one voyage as a slave ship in the triangular trade in enslaved people. Between 1812 and 1814 she was a whaler in the British southern whale fishery. Afterwards she started trading with Charleston, but in November 1816 she was driven ashore near Liverpool as she was outward bound. She was surveyed and found not worthy of repair.
- Mary Ann (1807 ship) was launched in 1807 at Liverpool. She made one voyage as a slave ship in the triangular trade in enslaved people. She then became a West Indiaman. From 1811 she became a Falmouth packet. In 1813 a United States privateer captured her.
- Mary Ann (1808 Batavia ship) (or Mary Anne) was launched at Batavia in 1808. In 1815-1816 she transported convicts from London to Port Jackson. She then started trading with India under a licence from the British East India Company (EIC). She made a second voyage transporting convicts, carrying some to Tasmania and some on to Port Jackson. After this voyage Mary Ann returned to being an East Indiaman. She was last listed in 1830.
- Mary Ann was a paddle steamer built in 1852 in South Australia by William Randell for use on Australia's Murray River, the longest river on the continent. It was the first paddle steamer to operate on the river.
