= Hope (1802 ship) =

Ship wrecked in Australia in 1817

History
- Name: Hope
- Owner: Originally:Andrew Thompson; Later:Solomon Wiseman
- Builder: Andrew Thompson, Hawkesbury
- Launched: 1802
- Fate: Wrecked in 1817 at Port Stephens, New South Wales, Australia

General characteristics
- Tons burthen: 16 (bm)
- Sail plan: Sloop
- Complement: 2

Hope was a small ship launched in 1802. She wrecked at Port Stephens, New South Wales, Australia in 1817.

Hope was registered on 18 October 1802. At that time her owner (and builder) Andrew Thompson generally employed her on the Hawkesbury. On 28 February 1804 she was described as operating in the Bass Strait. Thompson died on 22 October 1810.

== Loss ==
At the time of Hope's loss in 1817 her owner was Solomon Wiseman.

The crew of two, Benjamin Waterhouse (previously mate of HMS Lady Nelson), and James Cohen dropped anchor and rowed ashore to prospect for cedar. They did not return to their ship, and the presumption was that aborigines had murdered them. The ship was subsequently blown ashore and wrecked.
