= Hawkesbury Packet =

Sloop constructed in 1811

Coordinates: 34.6244°S 150.8624°E

History
- Name: Hawkesbury Packet
- Owner: Solomon Wiseman
- Launched: 1811
- Fate: Wrecked, August 1817

General characteristics
- Type: Sloop
- Tons burthen: 21 tons bm

Hawkesbury Packet was a sloop constructed for Solomon Wiseman that helped him 'rise' from being just a convict to a wealthy colonial landholder in Australia.

Constructed in 1811, Hawkesbury Packet was a 21-ton coastal trader. Prior to its final wrecking in 1817 it was blown ashore in 1816. On 24 May 1816 it sailed from Sydney to Newcastle but was hit by a gale and was forced into Port Stephens on 20 June 1816. Unable to exit the port because of contrary winds and with supplies nearly exhausted, two crew, George Yates and Nicholas Thompson chose to walk to Newcastle. They took an Aboriginal guide with them who took them to a tribe who stole all their clothes. Thompson died shortly after from exposure, hunger and exhaustion and Yates managed to make Newcastle by crawling the last three miles. The Commandant in Newcastle ordered provisions to be sent to Port Stephens and when they arrived they found that the ship had been driven ashore. It was eventually refloated and returned to Sydney around 15 August 1816.

On 14 August 1817 the ship sailed for the Shoalhaven, under the command of T. Walker, to pick up a load of cedar. However, on an unknown date in August the ship ran aground at Minnamurra near Kiama and was totally wrecked.
