= Edward Lombe (1828) =

19th century English sailing ship

Coordinates: 33°49.745′S 151°16.191′E

History

United Kingdom
- Name: Edward Lombe
- Owner: Robert Freeman (1833-1834)
- Port of registry: London 84/1828, 59/1832, 67/1834.
- Builder: Thomas Brodrick, Whitby
- Launched: 21 February 1828
- Fate: Wrecked on 25 August 1834

General characteristics
- Tons burthen: 347, or 3471/47 (bm)
- Length: 106 ft (32.3 m)
- Beam: 27 ft 8 in (8.43 m)
- Draught: 19 ft 2 in (5.8 m)
- Sail plan: Ship-rigged, then barque

Edward Lombe was a merchantman and passenger three-masted barque built in 1828 by Thomas Brodrick, of Whitby, England.

== Career ==
Edwarde Combe first appeared in Lloyd's Register (LR) in 1828 with Freeman, master and owner.

On 24 August 1830, she arrived at Fremantle, from London, carrying cargo and 22 passengers. She then returned to London. She was sheathed in copper in 1832.

Under the command of Whiteman Freeman, she left London with cargo on 25 June 1832. She left Hobart on 28 December, having taken on five convicts that Merope had delivered to Hobart from India. She arrived at Port Jackson, Australia, on 6 January 1833. She left Port Jackson on 15 April 1833 and returned to London, with a cargo of wool and passengers.

Under the command of Stuart Stroyan, she left London and arrived at Hobart on 31 July 1834. She left Hobart on 17 August 1834.

== Fate ==
While entering Port Jackson on 25 August 1834, she was blown onto Middle Head during a gale and was wrecked. The captain, four crew members, and six passengers lost their lives, most when heavy seas swept over her; two passengers (one of them a woman), and 16 crew survived. When she broke in half the poop containing most of the survivors remained on the rocks and at dawn the survivors were able to attract the attention of a passing ship.

== Post script ==
The loss of Edward Combe was one of the factors leading in August 1836 to Ann, the first lightship in Australia, being moored at the north-western end of Sow and Pigs Reef. She replaced an iron beacon that in 1820 had been placed on the reef. Between 1856 and 1877 HMS Bramble replaced Ann.
